= Männerstimmen Basel =

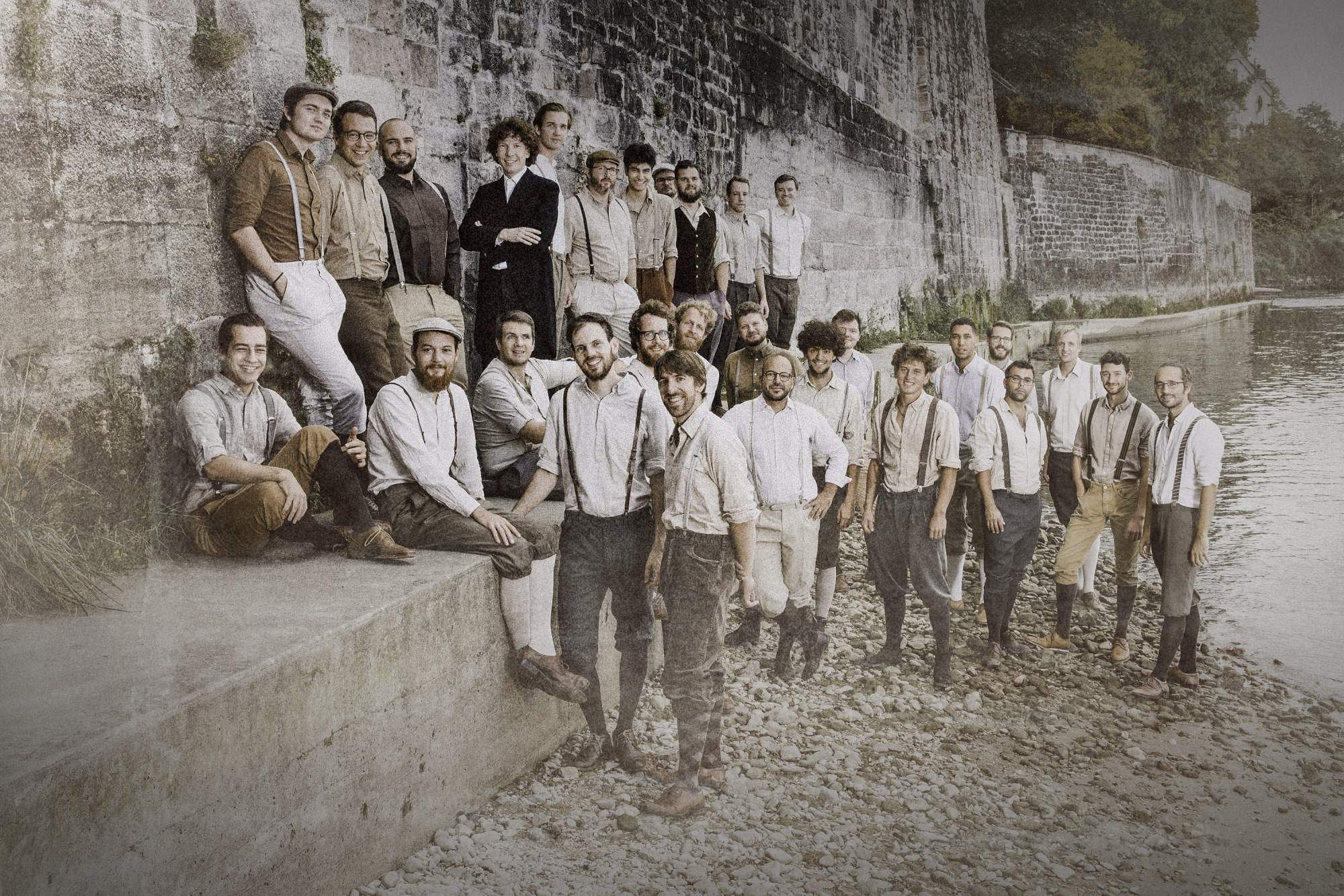
The choir in 2020

Männerstimmen Basel is a Swiss male choir founded in 2008 by former singers of the Basel Boys Choir. The choir has received prizes at various international choral festivals, including best male choir at the International Choir Festival Tallinn (2009), the Montreux Choral Festival (2012) and the World Choir Games in Cincinnati (2012). Their repertory covers works from the 16th century to present day, amongst them new compositions commissioned by the choir to Swiss composers (such as Basel 2010 by Rudolf Jaggi).

The choir released its first recording "Tonträger No. 1" in 2010, as well as a live concert video of its annual program "tøngedrøhn" in 2011. They have performed in various European countries, including Switzerland, Germany, France, the Baltic states, North Macedonia, Ireland, Iceland, Faroe Islands, Belarus, Ukraine, as well as the United States (New York, Chicago, Cincinnati).

From its forming until 2022, the choir is directed by Oliver Rudin. The current director is David Rossel, who has been co-directing the choir since its forming.

== Sources ==
- Official homepage
- interkultur.com - Männerstimmen Basel
- Ohrid Choir Festival 2010 - Männerstimmen Basel
- Rush Hour Concerts - Männerstimmen Basel
