= Melba Ramos =

Puerto Rican soprano singer

Melba Ramos is a Puerto Rican- born soprano active in the opera houses and concert halls of Europe. Since 1989 her operatic career has been primarily in Germany and in Austria where she has sung many leading roles at the Vienna Volksoper. In 2002, she created the role of Faustina in the posthumous premiere of Joachim Raff's Benedetto Marcello.

Ramos was born in Aguadilla, Puerto Rico and studied voice at the Pablo Casals Conservatory of Music in San Juan. A previous District winner of the Metropolitan Opera National Council Auditions, she made her official debut as Despina in Così fan tutte. From 1989 to 1992 was a member of the Opera Studio at Cologne Opera. She was then engaged by Wuppertal Opera and in 2002 by the Vienna Volksoper. Some of the roles she has portrayed at the Volksoper include, Cio-Cio-San in Madama Butterfly (2011), Giorgetta in Il Tabarro (2011), Leonora in Il trovatore (2013-2014), Liù in Turandot (2011), Rosalinde in Die Fledermaus (2011-2013), and title roles in Tosca (2010-2012) and Turandot (2014).

In 2003 she portrayed Fiordiligi in Così fan tutte at the Salzburg Festival. In 2010 she portrayed Cio-Cio-San at the Staatstheater Nürnberg, and later returned there as Tosca in 2014. In 2011 and 2012 she performed the role of Leonora at the Croatian National Theatre in Zagreb. In 2013 she portrayed Amelia in Un ballo in maschera at the Opernhaus Wuppertal. The following year she portrayed Lady Macbeth in Macbeth at the Saarländisches Staatstheater, and performed the role of Tigrane in Radamisto at the Palacio de Bellas Artes in Mexico City.

== Recordings ==
- Antonio Salieri's La passione di Gesù Cristo, conductor Christoph Spering, Das neue Orchester, and Cologne Musicus Choir; Capriccio, 2004
- Giuseppe Verdi's Messa da Requiem, conductor Marcus Bosch, Aachen Symphony Orchestra, Melba Ramos, Gabriele May, Michael Ende, and Martin Blasius; Coviello Classics, 2005
