= Christ on the Mount of Olives (Beethoven) =

Oratorio by Ludwig van Beethoven

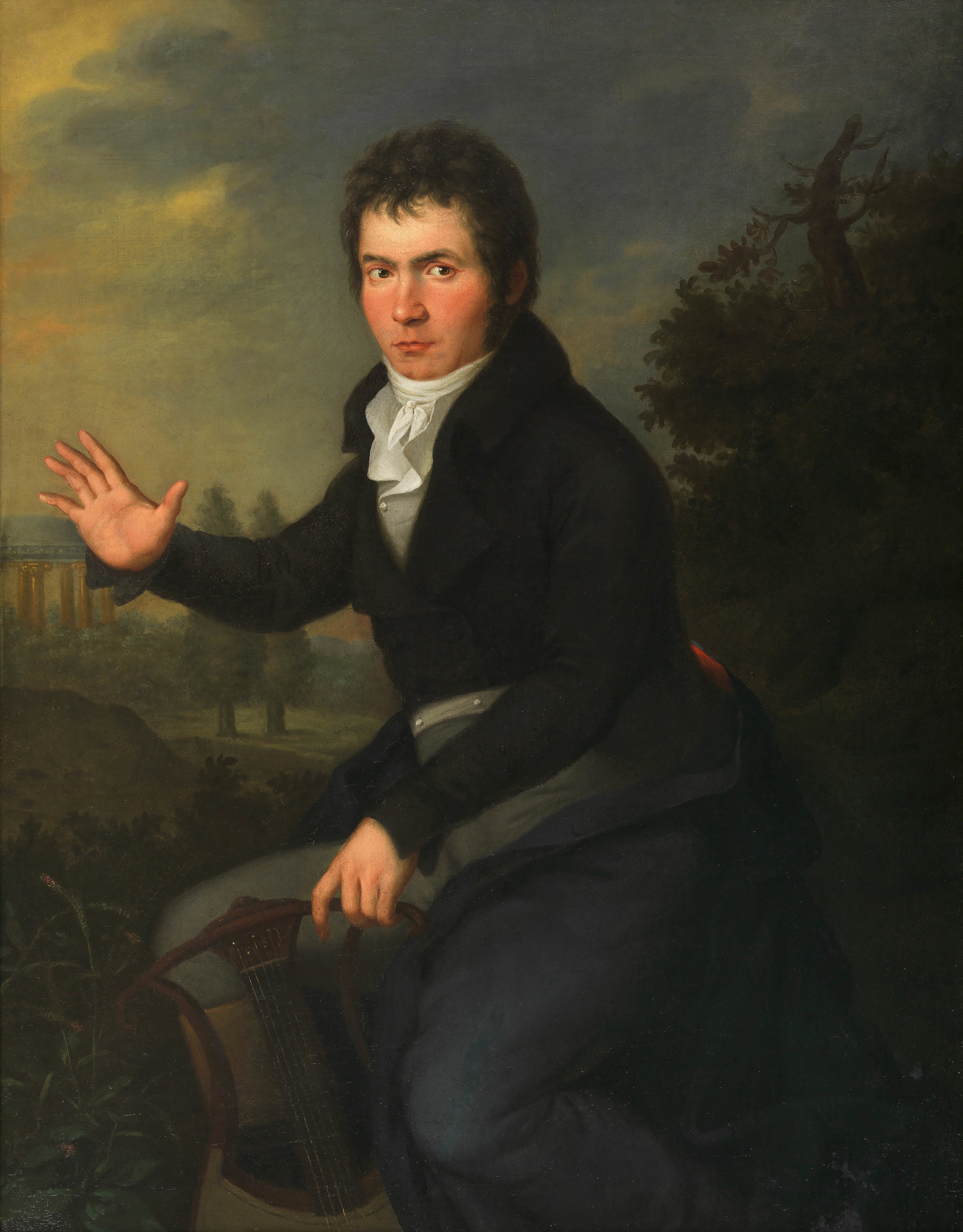
A portrait of Beethoven at age 33, with a lyre-guitar by Joseph Willibrord Mähler, c. 1804

Christus am Ölberge (in English, Christ on the Mount of Olives), Op. 85, is an oratorio by Ludwig van Beethoven portraying the emotional turmoil of Jesus in the garden of Gethsemane prior to his crucifixion. It was begun in the fall of 1802, soon after his completion of the Heiligenstadt Testament, as indicated by evidence in the Wielhorsky sketchbook. The libretto in German is by the poet Franz Xaver Huber, editor of the Wiener Zeitung, with whom Beethoven worked closely. It was written in a very short period; in a letter to Breitkopf & Härtel written shortly after the oratorio's completion, Beethoven spoke of having written it in "a few weeks", although he later claimed that the piece required no more than 14 days to complete.

It was first performed on April 5, 1803 at the Theater an der Wien in Vienna; in 1811, it was revised by Beethoven for publication by Breitkopf & Härtel. The 10 years that passed between the composition of the work and its publication resulted in its being assigned a relatively high opus number. The piece premiered in the United States in 1809; it was Beethoven's first success in the United States.

== Composition ==
The work is a dramatic oratorio and is considered a much more humanistic portrayal of the Christ passion than other settings, such as those by Bach. It concludes at the point of Jesus personally accepting his fate, placing the emphasis on his own decision rather than the later Crucifixion or Resurrection. The oratorio is scored for soprano, tenor, and bass soloists, with standard SATB chorus and symphony orchestra. The tenor sings as Jesus, with the soprano as a seraph (angel) and the bass as Peter. A complete performance lasts approximately 50 minutes.

Beethoven's only oratorio, he was quite critical of the piece and of the performance of the orchestra and chorus at its premiere. He panned Huber's libretto, saying, in an 1824 letter to the Gesellschaft für Musikfreunde, "Let us leave out of consideration the value of poems of this sort. We all know that allowances are to be made... so far as I am concerned, I would rather set Homer, Klopstock, Schiller to music. If they offer difficulties to overcome, these immortal poets at least are worthy of it." (Beethoven eventually did set Schiller to music in his monumental Ninth Symphony, nearly twenty years after the oratorio.) The editors at Breitkopf & Härtel agreed with Beethoven's critical assessment of the text, and Christian Schreiber was enlisted to make massive changes to the libretto. However, upon reviewing the changes, Beethoven still was not happy, saying, "I know that the text is extremely bad, but if even a bad text is conceived as a whole entity, it is very difficult to avoid disrupting it by individual corrections".

== Structure ==
The composition consists of six movements:

1. Introduction (Grave – Adagio) in E♭ minor – Recitative „Jehova, du, mein Vater!“ – Aria (Allegro) „Meine Seele ist erschüttert!“ in c minor
2. Recitative „Erzittre, Erde, Jehovahs Sohn liegt hier“ in A major – Aria (Larghetto) „Preist des Erlösers Güte“ in G major – Chorus (Allegro) „Oh, Heil euch, ihr Erlösten!“ in G major
3. Recitative „Verkündet, Seraph, mir dein Mund“ – Duet (Adagio molto) „So ruhe denn mit ganzer Schwere“ in A♭ major
4. Recitative „Willkommen, Tod!“ in F major – Chorus (Alla marcia) „Wir haben ihn gesehen“ in C major
5. Recitative (Tempo della Marcia) „Die mich zu fangen ausgezogen sind“ – Chorus (Allegro molto) „Hier ist er, hier ist er“ in D major
6. Recitative (Molto allegro) „Nicht ungestraft soll der Verwegnen Schar“ – Trio and chorus (Allegro ma non troppo) „In meinen Adern wühlen“ in B♭ major – Chorus with solo (Molto allegro) „Auf, auf, eingreifet der verräter – Final chorus (Maestoso – Allegro) „Welten singen“ - „Preiset ihn, ihr Engelschöre“ in C major

== Instrumentation ==
SATB choir
3 soloists (soprano, tenor and bass)
2 flutes
2 oboes
2 clarinets in B♭
2 bassoons
2 trumpets in D and E♭
2 horns in B♭, C, D and E♭
3 trombones (alto, tenor and bass)
timpani
1st violins
2nd violins
violas
cellos
double basses

The soloists are personas: the soprano is a Seraph, the tenor is Jesus and the bass is the apostle Peter.

== Reception ==
The critical response to the work's initial performance was mixed; while the Zeitung für die Elegante Welt's critic wrote that the oratorio contained "a few admirable passages", a review in the Freymüthige Blätter called the piece "too artificial in structure and lacking expressiveness, especially in the vocal music", and claimed that the performance "was unable to achieve really marked approbation". It has since drifted somewhat into obscurity, and today is seldom performed, being regarded by some as falling below Beethoven's usual standards of excellence. However, despite conflicting contemporary critical reports and Beethoven's own misgivings about the libretto, after its premiere in 1803 the work was performed four times in 1804 and repeated yearly around Easter, always drawing full houses, until 1825, when it was banned by the Hofmusikgraf.

The "Welten singen..." finale has become quite popular on its own, being rendered as a "Hallelujah" chorus, frequently performed by church, high school, and college choirs.

== Recordings ==
Year	Soloists (Jesus, Seraph, Peter)	Conductor, Orchestra and Chorus	Label
1957	Fritz Wunderlich, Erna Spoorenberg, Hermann Schey	Henk Spruit, Radio Philharmonisch Orkest and Groot Omroepkoor	BellaVoce
1962	Jan Peerce, Maria Stader, Otto Wiener	Hermann Scherchen, Vienna State Opera Orchestra and Vienna Academy Chorus	Westminster
1963	Reinhold Barthel, Liselotte Rebmann, August Messthaler	Josef Bloser, Stuttgart Philharmonic and the South German Choral Society	Vox/Turnabout
1963	Richard Lewis, Judith Raskin, Herbert Beattie	Eugene Ormandy, Philadelphia Orchestra and the Temple University Choirs	Columbia Masterworks
c.1965	Radko Delorco, Margit Opawsky, Walter Berry	Henry Swoboda, Vienna State Opera Orchestra and Vienna Academy Chorus	Concert Hall Society
1970	Nicolai Gedda, Cristina Deutekom, Hans Sotin	Volker Wangenheim, Orchester der Beethovenhalle Bonn, and choirs	EMI
1970	James King, Elizabeth Harwood, Franz Crass	Bernhard Klee; Vienna Symphony and Wiener Singverein	Deutsche Grammophon
1970	József Réti, Sylvia Geszty, Hermann Christian Polster	Helmut Koch; Berliner Rundfunk-Sinfonie-Orchester	Eterna
1992	James Anderson, Monica Pick-Hieronimi, Victor van Halem	Serge Baudo; Orchestre National de Lyon, with chorus	Harmonia Mundi
1994	Michael Brodard, Maria Venuti, Keith Lewis	Helmuth Rilling; Bach-Collegium Stuttgart and Gächinger Kantorei	Hänssler Classic
2000	Steve Davislim, Simone Kermes, Eike Wilm Schulte	Christoph Spering; Das Neue Orchester and Chorus Musicus Köln	Opus 111
2004	Plácido Domingo, Ľuba Orgonášová, Andreas Schmidt	Kent Nagano; Deutsches Symphonie-Orchester Berlin and Rundfunkchor Berlin	Harmonia Mundi
2020	Pavol Breslik, Elsa Dreisig, David Soar	Simon Rattle; London Symphony Orchestra and Chorus	LSO Live
