= Albert Dohmen =

Opera singer (born 1956)

- Born: 17 June 1956; Krefeld, North Rhine-Westphalia, West Germany
- Occupation: Operatic bass-baritone
- Organization: Hessisches Staatstheater Wiesbaden
- Awards: Bundeswettbewerb Gesang

Albert Dohmen (born 17 June 1956) is a German operatic bass-baritone who is known internationally for performing leading roles by Richard Wagner and Richard Strauss. He has also worked in concert halls and given lieder recitals.

== Career ==
Born in Krefeld, Dohmen took part in children's roles in opera performances. From 1970 to 1974 he studied oboe in Essen. In 1976 he won first prize at the Bundeswettbewerb Gesang in Berlin. Dohmen then studied law at the University of Cologne from 1976 to 1982. He received private singing lessons from soprano Gladys Kuchta. In 1982 he was accepted to the opera studio of the Deutsche Oper am Rhein. In 1986 he moved to the Hessisches Staatstheater Wiesbaden. He has been working as a freelancer since 1991.

His international breakthrough came in 1997 in the title role in Alban Berg's Wozzeck at both the Salzburg Easter Festival and the Salzburg Festival, directed by Peter Stein, both with Claudio Abbado conducting, the Berlin Philharmonic and the Vienna Philharmonic respectively. He then sang with conductors such as Lorin Maazel, Kurt Masur, Zubin Mehta, Michel Plasson, Georges Prêtre, Giuseppe Sinopoli, and Georg Solti. Dohmen is regarded as one of the leading interpreters of the role of Wotan in Wagner's Der Ring des Nibelungen. He sang this role in complete Ring cycles at the Grand Théâtre de Genève, the Dutch National Opera Amsterdam, the Deutsche Oper Berlin, from 2007 to 2010 under the direction of Christian Thielemann at the Bayreuth Festival, in 2009 with James Levine at the Metropolitan Opera, in 2011 at the Vienna State Opera, in 2012 at the Hamburg State Opera, and in 2013 to 2015 at the Liceu in Barcelona.

In 2010 he made his role debut as Gurnemanz in Wagner's Parsifal in Geneva. He appeared as Barak in Die Frau ohne Schatten by Richard Strauss, first at the Maggio Musicale Fiorentino conducted by Zubin Mehta. Dohmen performed internationally, including the Royal Opera House Covent Garden, Staatsoper Unter den Linden, Bavarian State Opera in Munich, Teatro Real de Madrid, Opéra Bastille, Palau de les Arts Reina Sofía, la Monnaie in Brussels, and Tokyo Bunka Kaikan.

Dohmen is regarded as one of the leading interpreters of Sachs in Wagner's Die Meistersinger von Nürnberg. He sang this role in Geneva, in 2009 at the Liceu, and in 2011 at the Berliner Philharmonie with Marek Janowski. He expanded his repertoire to bass roles, such as the Commendatore in a new production of Mozart's Don Giovanni at the Vienna State Opera in 2010, and King Marke in Wagner's Tristan und Isolde in 2011 with Christoph Eschenbach in Paris. In 2012, he appeared as King Heinrich in Wagner's Lohengrin at the Deutsche Oper Berlin, and the Landgrave in Wagner's Tannhäuser at the Berliner Philharmonie with Janowski. Further bass roles were Graf Waldner in Arabella by Richard Strauss at the Salzburg Easter Festival 2014 with Thielemann, and subsequently at the Semperoper in Dresden. From 2015, Dohmen appeared as Alberich in the Ring at the Bayreuth Festival. In 2017, he appeared as Pogner in the Meistersinger at La Scala of Milan in a production by the Zürich Opera House staged by Harry Kupfer and conducted by Daniele Gatti. He appeared as King Marke in Tristan and Isolde at the Liceu, staged by Àlex Ollé. In 2022 Dohmen returned to the Bayreuth Festival as Landgraf (Tannhäuser) and Hagen in a new Ring production (Twilight of the Gods). He is the only singer who has sung all the Wotans, all the Alberichs and Hagen at the Bayreuth Festival.

Dohmen has performed in concert at halls including the Suntory Hall in Tokyo, Carnegie Hall in New York City, Musikverein and Konzerthaus in Vienna, and the Royal Concertgebouw in Amsterdam. He has been giving lieder recitals from 2007, with a focus on Romantic music and late romanticism, singing works by Franz Schubert, Robert Schumann, Johannes Brahms, Hans Pfitzner, Richard Strauss, Franz Schreker, Hugo Wolf and Arnold Schönberg.
