= Hanno Müller-Brachmann =

German opera singer

- Born: 1970 (age 54–55); Cologne
- Education: Knabenkantorei Basel; Musikhochschule Mannheim
- Occupations: Classical bass-baritone; Academic voice teacher; President and jury member of competitions
- Organizations: Cologne Opera; Deutsche Oper Berlin; Opernhaus Kiel; Hochschule für Musik Hanns Eisler; Hochschule für Musik Karlsruhe; Bundeswettbewerb Gesang
- Awards: Bundeswettbewerb Gesang; Brahms-Preis; ARD International Music Competition
- Website: www.mueller-brachmann.com

Hanno Müller-Brachmann (born 1970) is a German bass-baritone who made an international career in both opera and concert. A member of the Berlin State Opera from 1998 to 2011, he first sang Mozart roles such as Papageno and Figaro, and created roles in premieres such as Mephistopheles in Dusapin's Faustus, the Last Night in 2006.

== Career ==
Born in Cologne, Müller-Brachmann was a member of the boys' choir Knabenkantorei Basel, where his musical talent was discovered. He studied music pedagogy in Freiburg im Breisgau with Ingeborg Most. He continued his studies of Lied with Dietrich Fischer-Dieskau in Berlin, on a scholarship of the Studienstiftung des deutschen Volkes. He studied further with Rudolf Piernay at the Musikhochschule Mannheim and took his concert diploma singing the role of Elijah in Mendelssohn's oratorio. In 1995, he achieved a second prize at the competition for young singers Neue Stimmen of the Bertelsmann Foundation.

Daniel Barenboim engaged him at the Berlin State Opera in 1998, where he stayed until 2011 and performed in many operatic roles, such as Masetto and Leporello in Mozart's Don Giovanni, the title role in his Le nozze di Figaro, Guglielmo in his Così fan tutte, Kaspar in Weber's Der Freischütz, and Escamillo in Bizet's Carmen. He took part in premieres of new operas: creating in 1999 the role "Harry or Larry, a bridegroom and a clown" in Elliott Carter's What Next?, and in 2006 the role of Mephistopheles in Dusapin's Faustus, the Last Night, conducted by Michael Boder. Müller-Brachmann performed as a guest at the Salzburg Festival, the San Francisco Opera, in Vienna and in Modena.

In concert and recital, he sang in notable halls around the world. He recorded with notable conductors, for example Papageno in Die Zauberflöte with Claudio Abbado, a recording that won a Gramophone Award, and Bach's St Matthew Passion as the vox Christi with Riccardo Chailly and the Thomanerchor. He recorded Mozart's Requiem with Philippe Herreweghe Mahler's Eighth Symphony with Pierre Boulez, and his Des Knaben Wunderhorn with Michael Gielen.

He was a professor of voice at the Hochschule für Musik Hanns Eisler from 2006 to 2011, and from 2011 at the Hochschule für Musik Karlsruhe. From 2008 to 2011 he was president of the Bundeswettbewerb Gesang, and afterwards on its board. He served in the juries of international competitions such as the International Bach Competition in Leipzig and the international competition "Franz Schubert und die Musik der Moderne" (Franz Schubert and Contemporary Music) in Graz.

== Awards ==
Müller-Bachmann's awards have included:

- 1992 First prize Bundeswettbewerb Gesang for juniors
- 1994 First prize Bundeswettbewerb Gesang in the category concert
- 1995 First prize "Meistersingerwettbewerb Nürnberg"
- 1995 Brahms-Preis of the Brahms-Gesellschaft Schleswig-Holstein
- 1996 Second prize ARD International Music Competition in Munich

== Discography ==
Recordings by Müller-Brachmann are held by the German National library:

- Salieri: La passione di Gesù Cristo (Salieri), Christoph Spering (Capriccio 2004)
- Bach: Church solo cantatas, Helmut Müller-Brühl (Naxos 2005)
- Mozart: Requiem, Philippe Herreweghe (Harmonia Mundi 2005)
- Robert Schumann: Der Rose Pilgerfahrt, Marcus Creed (Harmonia Mundi 2005)
- Bach: Matthäus-Passion (bass arias), Helmut Müller-Brühl (Naxos 2006)
- Mozart: Die Zauberflöte (as Papageno), Claudio Abbado (Deutsche Grammophon 2006)
- Brahms: Ein deutsches Requiem, Stephen Cleobury (EMI 2006)
- Bach: Mass in B minor, Philippe Herreweghe (Harmonia Mundi 2007)
- Mahler: Eighth Symphony, Pierre Boulez (Deutsche Grammophon 2007)
- Brahms: Ein deutsches Requiem Zubin Mehta (Helicon Classics 2009)
- Bach: Matthäus-Passion (vox Christi), Riccardo Chailly (Decca 2010)
- Gustav Mahler: Des Knaben Wunderhorn, Michael Gielen (Hännsler Classic 2011)
- Haydn: Die Jahreszeiten, Bruno Weil (Ars Produktion 2011)
- Bach: Johannes-Passion (vox Christi), John Eliot Gardiner (Soli Deo Gloria 2011, recorded in 2003)
- Mahler: Eighth Symphony, Markus Stenz (OehmsClassics 2012)
- Haydn: Die Schöpfung, Bruno Weil (Ars Produktion 2012)
- Beethoven: Ninth Symphony, Riccardo Chailly (Decca 2012)
