= Sebastian Wartig =

German opera singer

Sebastian Wartig (born in 1989) is a German operatic and concert baritone.

== Life and career ==
Born in Dresden, Wartig was a member of the Dresdner Kreuzchor from 1998 to 2008. He studied with Kammersänger Roland Schubert at the University of Music and Theatre Leipzig, where he received his diploma. In the 2013/14 season, Wartig became a member of the ensemble of the Semperoper Dresden. In 2013, Wartig appeared on the television programme Stars von morgen hosted by Rolando Villazón.

In the 2014 New Year's Eve concert of the Semperoper, he played Feri in the operetta Die Csárdásfürstin with Anna Netrebko and Juan Diego Flórez. The concert, conducted by Christian Thielemann, was also broadcast on the ZDF. At the 2018 New Year's Eve concert, which was also broadcast on the ZDF, Wartig performed as Dr. Falke in Die Fledermaus.

== Repertoire ==
His opera repertoire includes Colas (Bastien und Bastienne), Momus (Platée), Sid (Albert Herring), the Count (Le nozze di Figaro), Papageno (The Magic Flute), Marullo (Rigoletto), Moralès (Carmen), Schaunard and Marcello (La Bohème), Father (Hänsel and Gretel'), Melot (Tristan and Isolde), Harlequin (Ariadne on Naxos), Boris (Moscow, Cheryomushki), Frank and Fritz (Die tote Stadt), and Kaiser Overall (Der Kaiser von Atlantis).

Wartig's oratorio repertoire includes among others Bach's Christmas Oratorio and St John Passion, Handel's Utrecht Te Deum and Jubilate, Marc-Antoine Charpentier's Te Deum and Brahms’ Ein deutsches Requiem.

== Prizes and scholarships ==
- 2005, Jugend musiziert, 2nd place (national level)
- 2008, Jugend musiziert, 2nd place (national level)
- 2011, Albert-Lortzing-Wettbewerb, 1st place
- 2012, 16th Robert Schumann International Competition for Pianists and Singers, 2nd place (Gesang Herren)
- 2013, Neue Stimmen, semi-finalist
- 2013, Rudolf Mauersberger Stipendium der Stiftung Dresdner Kreuzchor
- 2014, Bundeswettbewerb Gesang Berlin, 1st place
