= La passione di Gesù Cristo (Salieri) =

1776 oratorio by Antonio Salieri

La passione di Gesù Cristo is an oratorio by composer Antonio Salieri that uses a libretto by Metastasio. While many composers set music to this libretto, Metastasio is recorded to have remarked to Holy Roman Emperor Joseph II that Salieri's setting "was the most expressive of any written on this poem." The work premiered in Vienna, Austria during the advent season of 1776.

In 2004 Capriccio released a recording of the work by the Das Neue Orchester and Chorus Musicus Köln under conductor Christoph Spering with soloists Melba Ramos, Hanno Müller-Brachmann, Franziska Gottwald, and Florian Mock.
