= Le Grand Macabre =

Opera by György Ligeti

- Opera by György Ligeti
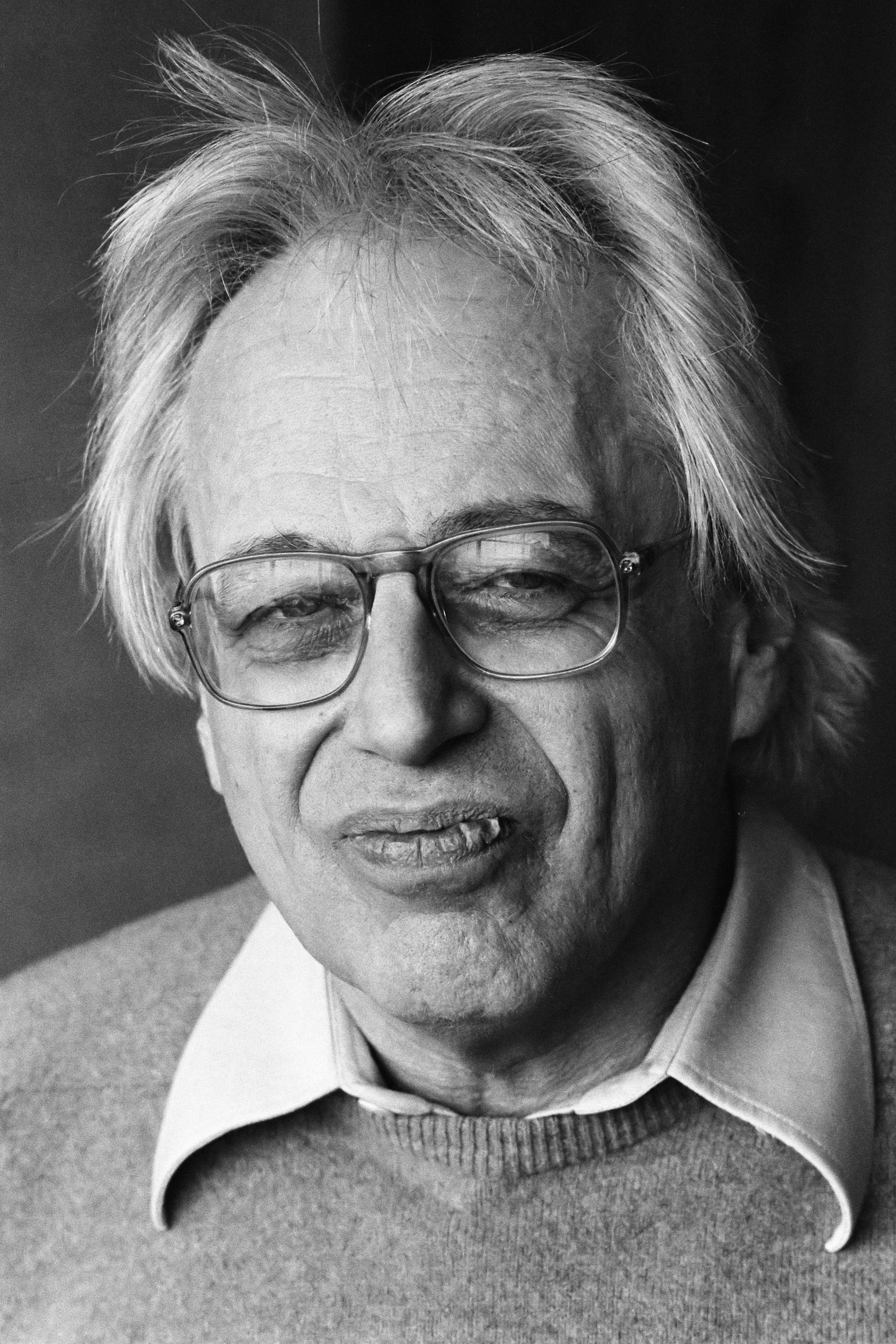
- György Ligeti in 1984
- Librettist: György Ligeti; Michael Meschke
- Language: German
- Based on: La Balade du Grand Macabre by Michel de Ghelderode
- Premiere: 12 April 1978 (in Swedish); Royal Swedish Opera, Stockholm

Le Grand Macabre (completed 1977, revised 1996) is the third stage production by Hungarian composer György Ligeti, and his only major stage-work. Previously, he had created two absurdist sung "mimodramas" Aventures (compl. 1962) and Nouvelles aventures (1965).

Described as an "anti-anti-opera", Le Grande Macabre has two acts and lasts about 100 minutes. Its libretto, based on Michel de Ghelderode's 1934 play La balade du Grand Macabre, was written by Ligeti himself in collaboration with Michael Meschke, director of the Stockholm Puppet Theatre. The language was German, the title Der grosse Makaber. But for the first production, in 1978, it was translated into Swedish by Meschke under the French title by which it has been known ever since, and under which it was published. Besides these two languages, Le Grand Macabre has been performed in English, French, Italian, Hungarian and Danish, with only a few notes needing to be changed in order to adjust.

The piece contains a dual role for a coloratura soprano that is considered exceptionally difficult; in its premiere the roles were sung by different singers.

== Premiere, productions and revision ==
Le Grand Macabre was premiered in Stockholm on 12 April 1978. At least 30 productions have followed. For one in Paris in February 1997 (under the auspices of that summer's Salzburg Festival), Ligeti the previous year prepared a revision, making cuts to Scenes 2 and 4, setting some of the originally spoken passages to music and removing others altogether. (As it turned out, the composer was annoyed by the Paris staging, by Peter Sellars, and expressed his displeasure publicly. Sellars, he said, had gone against his desire for ambiguity by explicitly depicting an Apocalypse set in the framework of the Chernobyl Disaster.) This 1996 revised score was published and has become standard. Conductors who have championed Le Grand Macabre include Elgar Howarth, Esa-Pekka Salonen, Michael Boder, Alan Gilbert, Sir Simon Rattle, Thomas Guggeis, who led a new staging by Vasily Barkhatov in November 2023 at Oper Frankfurt, and Pablo Heras-Casado, who conducted a different new production a week later at the Vienna State Opera.

== Roles ==
Roles, voice types, premiere cast
Role	Voice type	Premiere cast, 12 April 1978 Conductor: Elgar Howarth
Chef der Gepopo (Chief of the Gepopo, the political police)	high coloratura soprano	Britt-Marie Aruhn
Clitoria (Amanda in the revision), lover	soprano	Elisabeth Söderström
Spermando (Amando in the revision), lover	mezzo-soprano	Kerstin Meyer
Mescalina, wife to Astradamors (and sadist)	mezzo-soprano	Barbro Ericson
Fürst Go-Go (Prince Go-Go)	countertenor (or boy treble)	Gunilla Slättegård
Piet vom Fass (Piet the Pot)	tenor	Sven-Erik Vikström
Nekrotzar (title role)	baritone	Erik Saedén
Astradamors, astronomer (and masochist)	bass	Arne Tyrén
supporting roles:
Venus	coloratura soprano	Monika Lavén/Kerstin Wiberg (voice)
Ruffiack, ruffian No. 1	bass	Ragne Wahlroth
Schobiack, ruffian No. 2	baritone	Hans-Olof Söderberg
Schabernack, ruffian No. 3	bass	Lennart Stregård
White-party minister	spoken role	Dmitry Cheremeteff/Sven-Erik Vikström (voice)
Black-party minister	spoken role	Nils Johansson/Arne Tyrén (voice)
Chorus: people of Breughelland; spirits; echo of Venus

The roles of Venus and Chef der Gepopo are occasionally sung by the same coloratura, a dual role that is considered exceptionally difficult. Opera critic Joshua Kosman called it "fiercely demanding".

== Musical numbers ==
=== Act 1 ===
Scene 1

1. Car Horn Prelude
2. Scene One: Dies Irae
3. Away, you swag-pot!
4. Shut up!
5. Oh...! – Amanda! Can do no more!
6. Ha-ha-ha-ha! Hey! Give me my requisites, slave
7. Melting snow is thy breast
8. Second Car Horn Prelude

Scene 2

9. One! Two! Three! Five!
10. Shapely and attractive figure
11. Venus! Venus!
12. Stop! – Sh!… Quiet, for heaven's sake!
13. Who's there? A Man? – A Man!
14. Finale: Fire and death I bring

=== Act 2 ===
Scene 3

1. Door Bell Prelude
2. Arse licker, arse-kisser!
3. Posture exercises!
4. Tsk… – Pssst! Ha! Head of my Secret Service
5. Ahh!… Secret cypher!
6. Hurray, hurray! My wife is dead, hurray!
7. Nekrotzar's Entrance
8. Woe! Ooh! For the day of wrath
9. There's no need to fear
10. Up! – Drink! – Up!
11. Galimathias: Hmm! It's delicious
12. Where am I? What time is it?

Interlude

13. Scene Four: Ghost Astradamors, are you dead?
14. Mirror Canon
15. Finale. Passacaglia: Ah, it was good

== Orchestration ==
Ligeti calls for a very diverse orchestra with a huge assortment of percussion in his opera:

Woodwinds
3 flutes (second and third doubling piccolos)
3 oboes (second doubling oboe d'amore, 3rd doubling cor anglais)
3 clarinets in B♭ (second doubling piccolo clarinet in E♭ and alto saxophone, 3rd doubling bass clarinet in B♭)
3 bassoons (third doubling contrabassoon)
3 chromatic harmonicas (played by either horn-players or percussionists)

Brass
4 horns in F
4 trumpets in C (first and second doubling piccolo trumpets in D)
1 bass trumpet in C
3 trombones (tenor, tenor-bass and contrabass)
1 contrabass tuba

Percussion
timpani
percussion (three players)

Keyboard
celesta (doubling harpsichord)
grand piano (doubling electronic piano)
electronic organ (manuals only, doubling regal)

Strings
mandolin
harp

3 violins
2 violas
6 cellos
4 double basses

The vast percussion section uses a large variety of domestic items, as well as standard orchestral instruments:

xylophone
vibraphone
glockenspiel
marimba
12 car-horns at different pitches
4 music boxes
6 Electric doorbells
2 tambourines
military drum
2 snare drums
3 bongo drums

conga
tenor drum
parade drum
4 tom-toms
2 bass drums
2 triangles
3 crotales
3 suspended cymbals
1 pair of antique cymbals
2 pairs of crash cymbals
gong in E♭

2 tam-tams
tubular bells
2 Japanese temple bells
maracas
2 güiros
2 whips
1 pair of claves
1 pair of castanets
ratchet
3 wood blocks
log drum

5 temple blocks
large sledgehammer
wooden slats
slide whistle
whistle
cuckoo whistle
signal whistle
siren whistle
steamboat whistle
2 sirens
2 flexatones

duck-quacker
hum pots
large alarm clock
large pyramidal metronome
paper (either silk or newsprint)
1 pair of sandpaper blocks
wind machine
paper bag
tray full of crockery
sauce pan
pistol
lion's roar

== Synopsis ==
=== Act 1 ===
Scene 1 This opens with a choir of 12 jarring car horns, played with pitches and rhythms specified in the score. These suggest, very abstractly, a barren modern landscape and a traffic jam of sorts. As the overture ends, Piet the Pot, "by trade wine taster", in the country of Breughelland (named after the artist that loosely inspired it), appears to deliver a drunken lament, complete with hiccups. He is accompanied by bassoons, which become the representative instrument for his character. The focus switches to two lovers, Amanda and Amando, who are played by two women even though they represent an opposite-sex couple. Nekrotzar, prince of Hell, hears the lovers from deep inside his tomb and subtly joins their duet. The lovers, confused, discover Piet and become enraged, believing he is spying on them. Piet protests that he "spoke no word, so who spoke? The almighty?" The lovers hide in the tomb to make love.

Nekrotzar emerges, singing a motif, exclaiming "away, you swagpot! Lick the floor, you dog! Squeak out your dying wish, you pig!" Piet responds in kind, with confused drunken statements, until Nekrotzar at last tells him to "Shut up!". Piet must become Death's slave and retrieve all of his "instruments" from the tomb. As Nekrotzar's threats grow deadlier, Piet accepts them with only amused servility, until he is told his throat is to be "wracked with thirst". He objects, because his master had "spoke of death, not punishment!" As Nekrotzar explains his mission, accompanied by percussive tone clusters in the lowest octave of the piano and the orchestra, a choir joins in, admonishing "take warning now, at midnight thou shalt die". Nekrotzar claims he will destroy the earth with a comet God will send to him at midnight. A lone metronome, whose regular tempo ignores that of the rest of the orchestra, joins in. Nekrotzar, making frenzied proclamations, dons his gruesome gear, accompanied by ever more chaotic orchestra, women's choir, and a bass trombone hidden on a balcony, his characteristic instrument. He insists that Piet must be his horse, and Piet's only protest is to give his final cry, "cock-a-doodle-doo!" As they ride off on their quest, the lovers emerge and sing another duet, vowing to ignore the end of time completely and enjoy each other's company.

Scene 2 This begins with a second car horn prelude, which announces a scene change to the household of the court astronomer, Astradamors, and his sadistic wife, Mescalina. "One! Two! Three! Five!" exclaims Mescalina, beating her husband with a whip to the rhythm of shifting, chromatic chords. Astramadors, dressed in drag, unenthusiastically begs for more. She forces him to lift his skirt, and strikes him with a spit. Convinced she has killed him, she begins to mourn, then wonders if he's really dead. She summons a spider, apparently her pet, accompanied by a duo for harpsichord and organ – Regal stops. Astradamors rises, protesting that "spiders always give [him] nausea". As punishment for attempting to fake death, she forces him to take part in an apparent household ritual, a rhythmic dance termed "the Gallopade". This ends with the astronomer kissing her behind, singing "Sweetest Sunday" in falsetto.

Mescalina orders her husband to his telescope. "Observe the stars, left, right. What do you see up there? By the way, can you see the planets? Are they all still there, in the right order?" She addresses Venus with an impassioned plea for a better man, accompanied by an oboe d'amour. As she falls asleep, Astradamors quietly claims he would "plunge the whole universe into damnation, if only to be rid of her!" Right on cue, Nekrotzar arrives, announced by his trumpet, as Venus speaks to Mescalina. Venus informs Mescalina that she has sent "two men", and Nekrotzar steps forward, claiming to be the "well-hung" man Mescalina requested. They perform a stylized lovemaking, as Venus screeches her approval and Piet and Astradamors add their commentary. Nekrotzar suddenly bites Mescalina's neck, killing her, and insists that Piet and his new servant "move this thing [her corpse] out of the way". Driving triplets launch into the trio's humorous rant, "fire and death I bring, burning and shrivelling". Nekrotzar orders his "brigade" to "attention" and they prepare to set off for the royal palace of Prince Go-go. Before doing so, Astradamors destroys everything in his home, proclaiming "at last, I am master in my own house".

=== Act 2 ===
Scene 3 This opens with doorbells and alarm clocks, written into the score like the car horns earlier. These seem to represent the rousing of Breughelland as Death approaches. The curtain opens to the throne room, where two politicians dance a lopsided waltz and exchange insults in alphabetical order. "Blackmailer; bloodsucker!" "Charlatan; clodhopper!" "Driveller; dodderer!" "Exorcist; egoist!" "Fraudulent flatterer!" The prince arrives and begs them to put "the interests of the nation" over selfishness. They do so, but force Go-go to mount a giant rocking horse for his "riding lesson". The snare drum leads variations of military march-like music as the politicians contradict one another's advice, finally telling the prince "cavalry charge!" "As in war!" Go-go, who alternately refers to himself in the royal first-person plural, says, "We surrender!" and falls off his horse, to which the black minister says, over-significantly, "thus do dynasties fall". The prince recalls that war is barred in their constitution, but the politicians proclaim the constitution to be mere paper. Their manic laughter is accompanied by burping noises from the low brass. They move on to "posture exercises: how to wear a crown, with dignity". The politicians give him more conflicting advice as Go-go hesitates, accompanied by his characteristic instrument, the harpsichord. When Go-go puts on the crown, the politicians order him to memorize a speech and sign a decree (which raises taxes 100%), arguing over every insignificant issue the whole time. Each time the prince objects, they harmoniously threaten "I shall resign", a possibility of which Go-go seems to be terrified. The prince grows hungry, so the politicians tempt him with a gluttonous feast (to which the fat but boyish monarch sings an impassioned ode). With food in mind, Go-go finally asserts himself and says "we will accept your resignations" after dinner.

Gepopo, chief of espionage, sung by the same soprano who performed Venus, shows up with an army of spies and hangmen. Her high, wailing aria consists of "code language": tumbling, repetitive, hacked up words and phrases. Go-go comprehends the message: the people are planning an insurrection because they fear a great Macabre. The politicians go out on the balcony to try to calm the people with speeches, one after the other, but Go-go laughs at them as they are pelted by shoes, tomatoes, and other objects. He appears on the balcony and the people are enthusiastic, shouting "Our great leader! Our great leader! Go Go Go Go!" for over a minute. Their slow chant is gradually accelerated and its rhythm and intervals transformed, drowning out the Prince's remarks (only his gestures are visible). However, Gepopo receives a dispatch (a comic process in which every spy inspects and authenticates it by pantomime) and warns Go-go with more code language that a comet is drawing closer and a true Macabre is approaching. The politicians try to play it off as alarmism but promptly flee the stage when a solitary figure approaches from the direction of the city gate. Go-go proclaims that he is "master in [his] own house" and calls on "legendary might, hallmark of Go-gos" for the tough times ahead. Gepopo warns the prince to call a guard (in her usual "code" style), but it is only Astradamors, who rushes to greet the prince. The two dance and sing "Huzzah! For all is now in order!" (a false ending), ignoring the people's frantic pleas. A siren wails and a bass trumpet announces danger. Go-go is ordered to go "under the bed, quick!" Nekrotzar wordlessly rides in on the back of Piet as "all Hell follows behind". The processional takes the form of a passacaglia, with a repeating pattern in timpani and low strings (who play a parodic imitation of Movement 4 from Beethoven's Eroica Symphony), a scordatura violin (playing a twisted imitation of Scott Joplin's "The Entertainer"), bassoon, sopranino clarinet, and piccolo marching with the procession, and slowly building material in the orchestra.

"Woe!" exclaims Nekrotzar from the balcony. "Woe! Woe!" respond the terrified people. He presents death prophecies such as "the bodies of men will be singed, and all will be turned into charr'd corpses, and shrink like shriveled heads!" His bass trumpet has been joined on the balcony by a little brass ensemble, which punctuates him with two new motifs. The people, several of whom have been disguised the whole time as audience members in opera clothes, beg for mercy. Piet and Astradamors, who have been looking for an excuse to drink, ask the prince of death to eat Go-go's feast with them, a "right royal-looking restaurant". Piet suggests "before we start to dine, I recommend a drop of wine". The pair, who, as his servants, are unafraid of Nekrotzar, dance around playfully insulting him and encouraging him to drink wine. He does so, intoning "may these, the pressed out juices of my victims, serve to strengthen and sustain me before my necessary deed." The three dissolve into a grotesque dialogue, the timpani and orchestra hammering inscrutable off-beats. Nekrotzar says only "Up!" over and over again as he guzzles wine. Finished drinking and utterly incapacitated, he rants and raves about his achievements. "Demolished great kings and queens in scores / no one could escape my claws / Socrates a poison chalice / Nero a knife in his palace." The string music that played while he killed Mescalina is reiterated. Midnight draws near, but Nekrotzar can't stand up. Go-go emerges from hiding, is introduced to "Tsar Nekro" as "Tsar Go-go", and the four perform stripped-down comedy sketches accompanied by stripped-down music. Nekrotzar tries to mount the rocking horse, commanding "in the name of the Almighty, I smite the world to pieces." He retains only a shred of his formerly terrifying nature, but the end of the world is represented by a rough threnody in strings followed by swelling crescendos and decrescendos in the winds. The comet glows brightly and Saturn falls out of its ring in the stage's brightly lit sky.

Scene 4 Calming chords and low string harmonics are accompanied by prominent harmonica, setting the scene for the post-cataclysmic landscape. Piet and Astradamors, believing they are ghosts, float away into the sky. Go-go emerges and believes he is the only person left alive, but "three soldiers, risen from the grave to plunder, loot, and pillage all the good God gave" emerge. They order the "civilian" to halt, and refuse to believe Go-go's claim that he is the prince and he will give them "high decorations, silver and gold, and relieve [them] of official duties". Nekrotzar emerges, disgruntled, from an upturned cart, but his annoyance and confusion that some people seem to have survived is quickly replaced with terror as Mescalina emerges from the tomb. Rough tone clusters in woodwinds and percussion set off their slapstick chase scene, which is joined by Go-go, the soldiers, and the politicians, dragged in by one of the soldiers on a rope. They proclaim their innocence, but Mescalina accuses them of all kinds of atrocities, and they sling mud back at her. "But who invented the military coup?" "Yes, and who invented mass graves?" There is a massive fast-paced fight, and all collapse. Astradamors and Piet float by, and Go-go invites them for a drink of wine. "We have a thirst, so we are living!" they realize as they sink back to earth. Nekrotzar is defeated; they have all survived. In a very curious mirror canon for strings, he shrinks until he is infinitesimally small and disappears. The Finale features all tonal chords arranged in an unpredictable order. The lovers emerge from the tomb, boasting about what good they did. The entire cast encourages the audience: "Fear not to die, good people all. No-one knows when his hour will fall. Farewell in cheerfulness, farewell!"

== Utopia vs. dystopia ==
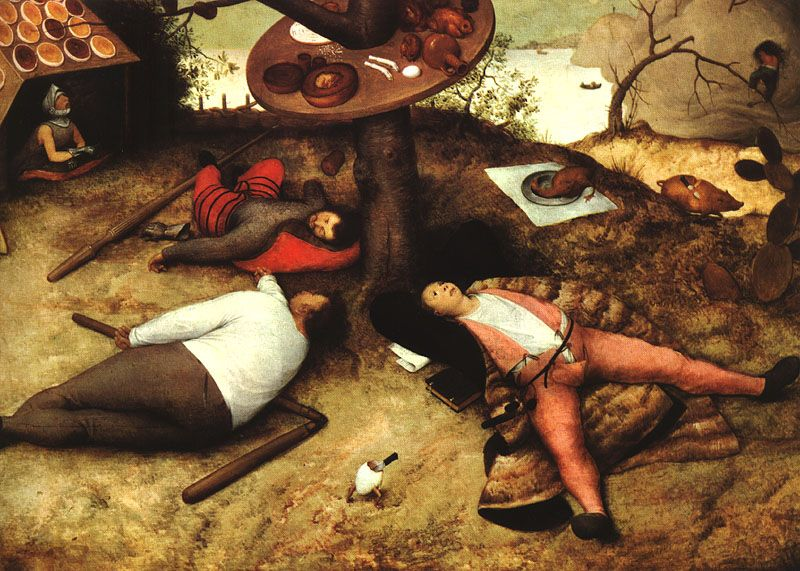
Pieter Bruegel the Elder, Het Luilekkerland (1567)

An important underlying theme of Ligeti's Grand Macabre is that of utopia and dystopia. Traditionally, dystopia and utopia have formed an alternative. Yet, as Andreas Dorschel argues, Ligeti and librettist Michael Meschke enact an intertwinement of dystopia and utopia, in a series of moves and countermoves: (1) Death threatens to eliminate all life. (2) The earth is saved from the fate of the destruction of life – "Death is dead" (II/4). (3) Yet "Breughelland" is and will remain a crude and cruel tyranny. (4) The farcical character of the whole calls into question whether any of the previous moves can be taken seriously. Ligeti/Meschke's subversion of the antinomy of utopia and dystopia, introduced in the opening "Breughellandlied", turns out to be in the spirit of Piet the Pot's namesake Pieter Bruegel the Elder, as Dorschel's interpretation of his 1567 painting Het Luilekkerland, an inspiration already to de Ghelderode, shows.

== Style ==
Le Grand Macabre falls at a point when Ligeti's style was undergoing a significant change—apparently effecting a complete break with his approach in the 1960s. From here onward, Ligeti adopts a more eclectic manner, re-examining tonality and modality (in his own words, "non-atonal" music). In the opera, however, he does not forge a new musical language. The music instead is driven by quotation and pastiche, plundering past styles through allusions to Claudio Monteverdi, Gioachino Rossini, and Giuseppe Verdi.

== Concert excerpts ==
Three arias from the opera were prepared in 1991 for concert performances under the title Mysteries of the Macabre. Versions exist for soprano or for trumpet, accompanied by orchestra, reduced instrumental ensemble, or piano.

== Recordings ==
- Ligeti, György. Szenen und Zwischenspiele aus der Oper Le Grand Macabre. Recorded 1979. Inga Nielsen (soprano), Olive Fredricks (mezzo), Peter Haage (tenor), Dieter Weller (baritone), Chorus and Orchester of the Danish Radio, Copenhagen, conducted by Elgar Howarth. LP recording. Wergo WER 60 085, Mainz: Wergo, 1980. OCLC 7855729
- Ligeti, György. Scènes et interludes du Grand Macabre (1978 version, part 1). Inga Nielsen (soprano), Olive Fredricks (mezzosoprano), Peter Haage (tenor), Dieter Weller (baritone), Nouvel Orchestre philharmonique de Radio France, conducted by Gilbert Amy. In Musique de notre temps: repères 1945–1975, CD no. 4, track 3. Adès 14.122–2. [N.p.]: Adès, 1988. OCLC 715940810
- Ligeti, György. Le Grand Macabre: Oper in zwei Akten (vier Bildern): (1974–1977). Recorded 16 October 1987, sung in German. Dieter Weller (baritone), Penelope Walmsley-Clark (soprano), Olive Fredricks (mezzosoprano), Peter Haage (tenor), the ORF-Choir, Arnold Schoenberg Choir (Erwin Ortner, choir-master), the Gumpoldskirchner Spatzen (Elisabeth Ziegler, choir-master), and the ORF Symphony Orchestra, conducted by Elgar Howarth. Wergo 2-CD set WER 286 170–2 (box); WER 6170-2 (CD 1); WER 6171-2 (CD 2). Mainz: Wergo, 1991. OCLC 257884070
- Ligeti, György. Le Grand Macabre (1997 version, in four scenes). Recorded live at the Théâtre du Châtelet, Paris, France, 5–13 February 1998. Sibylle Ehlert and Laura Claycomb (sopranos), Charlotte Hellekant and Jard van Nes (mezzosopranos), Derek Lee Ragin (countertenor), Graham Clark and Steven Cole (tenors), Richard Suart, Martin Winkler, Marc Campbell-Griffiths, and Michael Lessiter (baritones), Willard White and Frode Olsen (basses), London Sinfonietta Voices, Philharmonia Orchestra, conducted by Esa-Pekka Salonen. 2-CD set. Sony S2K 62312. György-Ligeti-Edition 8. [N.p.]: Sony Music Entertainment, 1999. OCLC 931896059
- Deutscher Musikrat. Musik in Deutschland 1950–2000, Musiktheater 7: Experimentelles Musiktheater, CD 2: Meta-Oper. Experimentelles Musiktheater. 1 CD recording. RCA Red Seal BMG Classics 74321 73675 2. Munich: BMG-Ariola, 2004.

György Ligeti: Le Grand Macabre: Oper in vier Bildern (1974–77, 1996 version, excerpts, recorded 1998). Caroline Stein (soprano: Venus), Gertraud Wagner (mezzosoprano: Mescalina). Brian Galliford (tenor: Piet vom Faß), Monte Jaffe (baritone), Karl Fäth (bass), Niedersächsisches Staatsorchester Hannover, Chor der Niedersächsischen Staatsoper, conducted by Andreas Delfs. (The CD also includes excerpts from Mauricio Kagel's Aus Deutschland, John Cage's Europeras 1 & 2, and Ligeti's Aventures für 3 Sänger und 7 Instrumentalisten. OCLC 177147032.

- Ligeti: Le Grand Macabre (Barcelona 2011) Chris Merritt, Barbara Hannigan, Gran Teatre del Liceu/ La Fura dels Baus/ Arthaus DVD 2012, OCLC 811206829.
