= Félix Rienth =

Swiss operatic tenor (born 1970)

Félix Rienth (born 24 June 1970) is a Swiss operatic tenor. Born in Basel, he was a member of the Basel Boys Choir in his youth. He made his first opera appearance as a boy with Theater Basel as the first boy in Wolfgang Amadeus Mozart's The Magic Flute. He attended the University of Basel, where he earned diplomas in the Spanish and German languages. He then studied singing privately in Basel with Heidi Wölnerhanssen before entering the Hochschule der Künste Bern; graduating from there in 2000 with a degree in opera performance. He has since had a major career as a concert singer in the oratorio repertoire; appearing with important ensembles and at major music festivals throughout Europe, including a recital in presence of Her Majesty, Queen Fabiola of Belgium. He has made about 20 recordings on a variety of labels. A highly acclaimed production was the recording of Johann Christoph Pepusch's "Tenor Cantatas" with his wife, Muriel Rochat Rienth, recorder player, and Swiss baroque ensemble "La Tempesta Basel". His CD of Spanish baroque songs "Tonos humanos" by José Marín was considered as a reference recording by German magazine "Klassik heute". 2014 is appearing Georg Philipp Telemann's "Tenor Cantatas" with "La Tempesta Basel", elected among "Best CDs of the month" by Spanish magazine RITMO.

== Discography (selection) ==
- 2004: Musique de la cathédrale de Oaxaca / Ensemble Elyma/ Gabriel Garrido/ K617
- 2006: Musique du Brésil au 16. siècle / Continens Paradisi/ Ricercar
- 2006: Francesc Valls: Cantatas / A corte musical/ Symphonia
- 2008: Johann Christoph Pepusch: Tenor Cantatas / La Tempesta Basel/ Enchiriadis
- 2011: José Marín: Tonos humanos /Felix Rienth, tenor - Manuel Vilas, harp/ La mà de Guido
- 2014: Georg Philipp Telemann: Tenor Cantatas / La Tempesta Basel / Enchiriadis
