= Joseph Schuster (composer) =

German composer

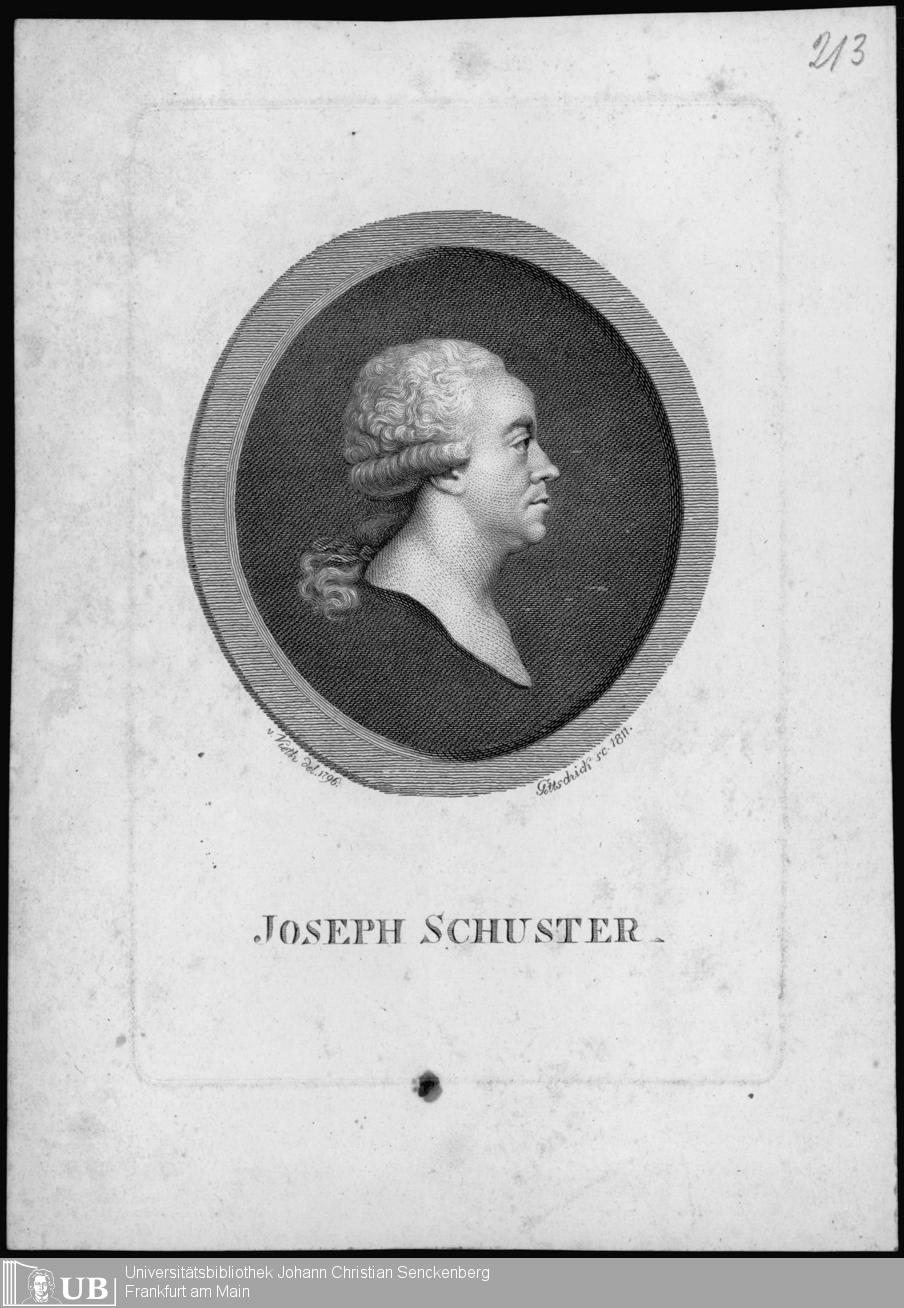
Joseph Schuster

Joseph Schuster (11 August 1748 – 24 July 1812) was a German composer.

== Life and career ==
Schuster was born in Dresden, where he received his first musical training from his father, a court musician, and from Johann Georg Schürer. Thanks to a scholarship from the Saxon Prince-electors, he was able to study with Giovanni Battista Martini and counterpoint in Venice with G. Pera from 1765 to 1768. In 1776, he completed his first opera seria Didone abbandonata, after a libretto by Metastasio. It was given at the Teatro San Carlo in Naples and by all accounts was a great success. In the same year, the opera seria Demofoonte premiered in Forlì.

In the following years, Schuster's position was solidified with operatic successes in Naples and Venice. He was also recognized in Germany as an accomplished composer, and his singspiel, Der Alchymist, oder Der Liebesteufel is considered one of the finest examples of the art form. Most of his works are assigned to the opera buffa, but he also composed religious works, chamber music and orchestral music.

Schuster's work is also found in the string quartets appendix of the Köchel catalogue (No. 210 et seq,), and for a long time the "Milan Quartets" (1772–73) were viewed as Mozart works. Schuster composed these works around 1780, which were long considered to be copies of Mozart originals. The musicologist Ludwig Finscher was able to uncover the true origin (in The Music Research, 1966).

Schuster died in Dresden.

== Selected works ==
- Oratorio - La passione di Gesù Cristo 1778, Dresden.
- La fedeltà in amore, Opera buffa, Dresda 1773
- L'idolo cinese, Opera buffa, Dresda 1776
- La Didone abbandonata, Opera seria, Napoli 1776
- Demofoonte, Opera seria, Forlì 1776
- L'amore artigiano, Opera buffa, Venezia 1776
- La schiava liberata, Opera seria-comica, Dresden 1777
- Der Alchymist oder Der Liebesteufel, Singspiel, Dresden 1778
- Die wüste Insel, Singspiel (after Metastasio, L'Isola disabitata), Leipzig 1779
- Bradamante, Dramma per musica, Padova 1779
- Creso in Media, Opera seria, Napoli 1779
- Amor e Psyche, Opera seria, Napoli 1780
- Ester, Oratorio, Venezia 1781
- Il marito indolente, Opera buffa, Dresden 1782
- Rübezahl ossia Il vero amore, Opera buffa, Dresden 1789
- Osmano dey d'Algeri, Opera buffa, Dresden 1800
- Il giorno natalizio, Opera buffa (Pasticcio), Dresden 1802
- Quartetti Nr. 1-6 „Quartetti Padovani“
- 6 Divertimenti da camera per pianoforte e violino, 1777, Kassel

== Sources ==
- Burde, Ines: "Joseph Schuster", Die Musik in Geschichte und Gegenwart, 2006. — Is. 15, pp. 353–355
- Ongley, Laurie: Liturgical Music in late eighteenth-century Dresden: Johann Gottlieb Naumann, Joseph Schuster, and Franz Seydelmann. New Heaven, 1992.
