= Caroline Stein =

German opera singer

- Born: 30 September 1965 (age 59); Königstein im Taunus
- Education: Musikhochschule Köln
- Occupation: Operatic coloratura soprano
- Organizations: Hessisches Staatstheater Wiesbaden; Musikhochschule Rostock; Musikhochschule Lübeck
- Awards: Bundeswettbewerb Gesang Berlin

Caroline Stein (born 1965) is a German operatic coloratura soprano and an academic voice teacher. She has appeared internationally, including contemporary opera, creating the Angel in Dusapin's Faustus, the Last Night at the Berlin State Opera.

== Career ==
Stein took piano and ballet lessons. She studied at the Musikhochschule Köln with Claudio Nicolai from 1983 to 1988. She first joined the ensemble of the Theater Würzburg, and moved to the Hessisches Staatstheater Wiesbaden in 1989, where she recorded in 1993 Der tapfere Soldat by Oscar Straus with the WDR Sinfonieorchester Köln conducted by Siegfried Köhler, alongside John Dickie and Johannes Martin Kränzle. She appeared at the Berlin State Opera first in 1990 as the Queen of the Night in Mozart's Die Zauberflöte. She was a member of the Staatsoper Hannover from 1991 to 1999.

Stein appeared at the Bayreuth Festival, as a Flower Maiden in Parsifal from 1999 to 2001, and as Woglinde in Der Ring des Nibelungen from 2002 to 2004. She performed as a guest, in 1991 as Blonde in Mozart's Die Entführung aus dem Serail at the Quebec Opera, in several stagings by Harry Kupfer at the Komische Oper Berlin, such as Die Zauberflöte and Henze's König Hirsch. She made her debut at The Proms in 2000, singing Mozart's Mass in C minor and Alban Berg's Altenberg Lieder with the Bochumer Symphoniker, conducted by Simon Rattle. In 2004, she appeared as Hilda Mack in Henze's Elegie für junge Liebende at the Berlin State Opera. In contemporary opera, she appeared there as the Angel in the premiere of Dusapin's Faustus, the Last Night in 2006.

Stein was nominated for Singer of the Year in 1989 by Opernwelt for her two parts in the German premiere of Ligeti's Le Grand Macabre. She was awarded a prize in the national competition Bundeswettbewerb Gesang Berlin in 1990.

Stein was a professor of voice at the Musikhochschule Rostock from 2010, and was appointed in 2012 professor of voice at the Musikhochschule Lübeck.
