= Faustus, the Last Night =

Opera by Pascal Dusapin

- Opera by Pascal Dusapin
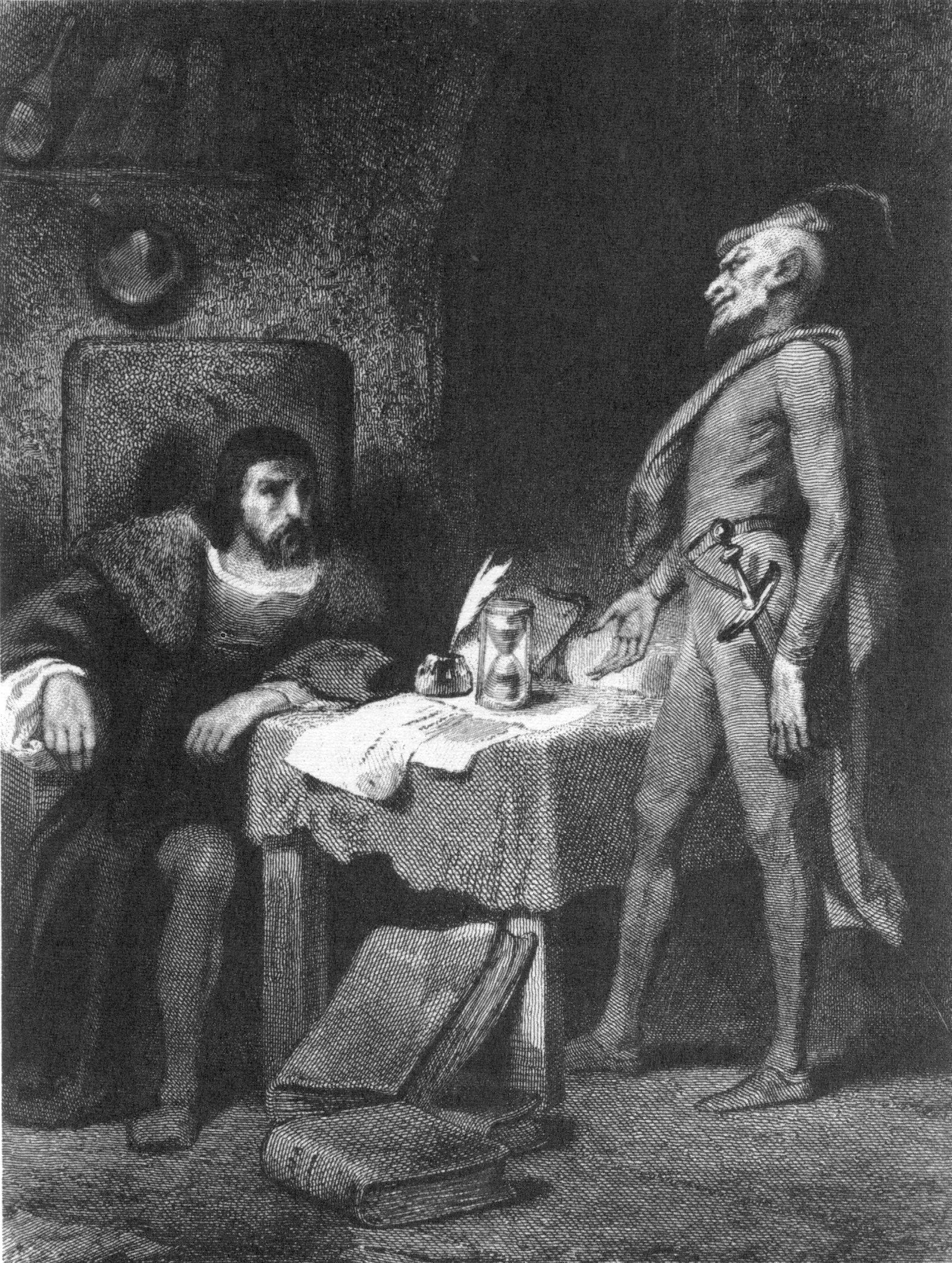
- Faust and Mephisto
- Librettist: Pascal Dusapin
- Language: English
- Based on: Doctor Faustus by Christopher Marlowe and other texts
- Premiere: 21 January 2006; Berlin State Opera

Faustus, the Last Night is an opera in English by French composer Pascal Dusapin, inspired by Doctor Faustus (c. 1588) by Christopher Marlowe. The work was premiered on 21 January 2006 by the Berlin State Opera, a coproduction with the Opéra de Lyon. It was first staged in the United States at the Spoleto Festival USA 2007.

== History ==
Faustus, the Last Night was commissioned by the Berlin State Opera and the Opéra National de Lyon. The genesis of Pascal Dusapin's fifth opera took ten years before the composer began writing the play in earnest between 2003 and 2004. The composer chose Marlowe's morality play rather than Goethe's drama as the basis of the composition. He wrote his own English-language libretto, inspired also by Caligula, Shakespeare, William Blake, Gertrude Stein, and Al Capone. Faustus has been described as a work of ideas rather than actions.

Dusapin's opera was premiered on 21 January 2006 at the Berlin State Opera, conducted by Michael Boder and staged by Peter Mussbach with Georg Nigl (Faustus), Hanno Müller-Brachmann (Mephistopheles), Robert Wörle (Sly), Jaco Huijpen (Togod), Caroline Stein (Angel) in the lead roles. Subsequently, the work was performed at the Opéra de Lyon where it was recorded on DVD. Jonathan Stockhammer conducted the Orchestre de l'Opéra de Lyon, and almost all Berlin soloists performed again with Urban Malmberg playing Mephistopheles. The first performance in the United-States was given at the Spoleto Festival USA in June 2007. It was staged by David Herskovits, with John Kennedy conducting the Festival Orchestra, and John Hancock in the title role.

== Roles ==
Role	Voice type	Premiere cast, 21 January 2006 Conductor: Michael Boder
Faustus	baritone	Georg Nigl
Mephistopheles	bass-baritone	Hanno Müller-Brachmann
Sly	tenor	Robert Wörle
Togod	bass	Jaco Huijpen
Angel	coloratura soprano	Caroline Stein

== Music ==
The composer regarded the Faustus tale as an allegory of man and power, the human obsession with power, and of light ("über den Menschen und die Macht, die Besessenheit von der Macht, vom Licht"); Faust could be a dictator, terrorist, or president. Faustus and Mephisto are like an old symbiotic couple. Their lines sometimes overlap, which a reviewer described as "blurring" the characters. Sly, a jestor from Shakespeare's The Taming of the Shrew, adds contrast.

The opera's "conversational tone" about "thought and concept" has been compared to Capriccio. In the orchestra, long chords contrast to short eruptions ("explosionsartigen Ausbrüchen"). A reviewer of The New York Times notes:

Mr. Dusapin's music also hovers and shimmers: an almost continuous, slowly shifting fabric of orchestral sound serves as a backdrop on which to hang the text and periodically swells to the foreground.
