= Siegfried Köhler (conductor) =

German conductor and composer (1923–2017)

- Born: 30 July 1923; Freiburg im Breisgau, Germany
- Died: 12 September 2017 (aged 94); Wiesbaden, Hesse, Germany
- Education: Musikhochschule Freiburg
- Occupations: Conductor; Composer; Academic teacher
- Organizations: Cologne Opera; Hochschule für Musik Köln; Musikhochschule Saarbrücken; Hessisches Staatstheater Wiesbaden; Royal Swedish Opera
- Awards: Order of Merit of the Federal Republic of Germany

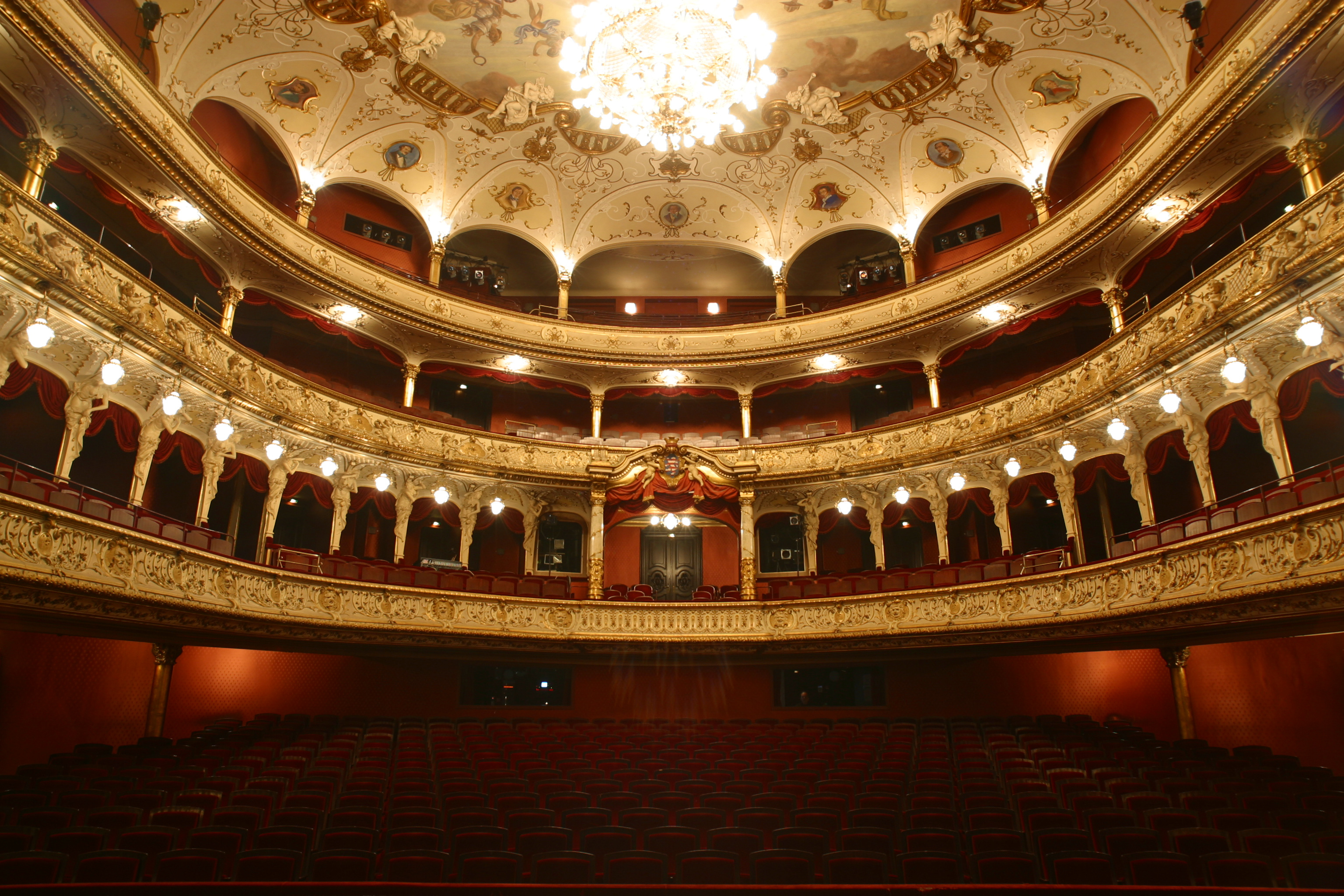
Staatstheater Wiesbaden, where Köhler worked 1973–1988

Siegfried Köhler (30 July 1923 – 12 September 2017) was a German conductor and composer of classical music. He worked as general music director of opera houses such as Hessisches Staatstheater Wiesbaden and the Royal Swedish Opera. Köhler conducted premieres of works by Hans Werner Henze and Volker David Kirchner, among others, and revived rarely performed operas. He also composed music for the stage and taught at universities of music in Cologne and Saarbrücken.

== Career ==
Born in Freiburg im Breisgau the son of a horn player, Köhler studied harp at the Musikhochschule Freiburg. From 1942, he worked at the Theater Heilbronn as a harpist and repetiteur. During World War II he was a Funker (radio operator). He conducted from 1946 in Freiburg, promoted in 1952 to 1. Kapellmeister (first conductor). From 1954, he worked at the opera in Düsseldorf. From 1957, he conducted at the Cologne Opera, and later became its Generalmusikdirektor (GMD). He conducted there in 1958 the first staged performance of Hans Werner Henze's ballet Das Vokaltuch der Kammersängerin Rosa Silber, with choreography by Lisa Kretschmar. He was also director of the Opernstudio of the Hochschule für Musik Köln. Köhler was GMD in Saarbrücken from 1964 to 1974, and simultaneously was professor of conducting at the Hochschule für Musik Saar. The soprano Inge Borkh recalled that Köhler was called to the Staatsoper Stuttgart to step in to prepare Richard Strauss' Die Frau ohne Schatten in 1970 because he had an understanding of the singers' breathing techniques.

From 1974 to 1988, Köhler was GMD at the Hessisches Staatstheater Wiesbaden. He presented an unusual repertoire, including Auber's Die Stumme von Portici and Wagner's Rienzi (with Ion Buzea in the title role, Eike Wilm Schulte as Steffano Colonna and Gail Gilmore as Adriano). Köhler conducted a performance during the Internationale of 1979 which was recorded live, with Gerd Brenneis as Rienzi, Jeannine Altmeyer as Irene and Glenys Linos as Adriano. He revived operas by Siegfried Wagner, holding days devoted to the composer twice, with concert performances of Sternengebot in 1977, and of Sonnenflammen in 1979. Köhler conducted premieres of operas by Volker David Kirchner, Die Trauung (The Wedding) in 1975 and Das kalte Herz (The Cold Heart) in 1981. He appeared as a guest conductor internationally with notable orchestras.

From 1989 until 1994, Köhler was chief conductor at the Royal Swedish Opera in Stockholm. He had conducted the Kungliga Hovkapellet first in 1975, and had the position of Hovkapellmästare from 1992 to 2005. In Stockholm, he conducted Mozart's Die Entführung aus dem Serail, Le nozze di Figaro and Don Giovanni, Offenbach's Les Contes d'Hoffman, Franz von Suppé's Boccaccio, Verdi's Simon Boccanegra, Wagner's Der fliegende Holländer, Lohengrin, Der Ring des Nibelungen and Parsifal, Puccini's Madama Butterfly, Elektra and Arabella by Richard Strauss. He conducted concerts such as Orff's Carmina Burana and the Swedish first performance of Mozart's Il Re Pastore. A ballet performance used as music Rimskij-Korsakov's Scheherazade, Bizet's Symphony in C, Arvo Pärt's Cantus in Memoriam Benjamin Britten and Four Last Songs by Richard Strauss.

Köhler's work is documented in recordings for radio and television, as well as in commercial releases. He conducted excerpts from his own works for WERGO, with the Staatsphilharmonie Rheinland-Pfalz and the Königliche Hofkapelle Stockholm. He recorded in 1993 Der tapfere Soldat by Oscar Straus with the WDR Sinfonieorchester Köln and principal singers Johannes Martin Kränzle as Bumeru, Caroline Stein as Nadina Popff, and John Dickie as Alexius Spiridoff.

Köhler wrote his autobiography in 2003, with the same title as his operetta, Alles Capriolen. and the subtitle Ein Jahrhundert im Musiktheater (A century of music for the stage). He died in Wiesbaden on 12 September 2017.

== Awards ==
In 1978, Köhler was awarded the Order of Merit of the Federal Republic of Germany. He was an honorary member of the Richard-Wagner-Verband of Saarland, and an honorary member of the Verband in Wiesbaden and of the Hessisches Staatstheater. He received the title Hovkapellmästare from the King of Sweden. In 2009, he received a Kulturpreis from Wiesbaden. On the occasion of his 90th birthday, the orchestra in Wiesbaden arranged a concert for him.

== Selected works ==
Stage

- Alles Capriolen (operetta)
- Sabine, sei sittsam (musical)
- Old Germany (musical)
- WirbelWind und WonneWolken (revue-opera)
- Ladies and Gentlemen (musical criminal comedy)

Instrumental

- Humoreske for harp
- Tango, Vision für großes Orchester
- Leidenschaft, Tanzszene für großes Orchester

Vocal

- Sechs ernste Lieder for soprano and piano

Cultural offices
Preceded by Philipp Wüst	Generalmusikdirektor, Saarländisches Staatsorchester Saarbrücken; 1964–1974	Succeeded by Christof Perick
Preceded by Heinz Wallberg	Generalmusikdirektor, Hessisches Staatstheater Wiesbaden; 1974–1988	Succeeded by Ulf Schirmer
