= Keystone State Boychoir =

Boys' choir in Pennsylvania, U.S.

The Keystone State Boychoir is a boys' choir in Pennsylvania. The group performs a wide range of songs and has sung on all seven continents.

== History ==
The Keystone State Boychoir (KSB) consists of more than 190 young men between the ages of 8 and 18, who perform a wide variety of styles including classical, contemporary, and diverse choral traditions.

Major choral works that KSB has performed include Orff's Carmina Burana, Handel's Messiah, Mendelssohn's Elijah, Britten's St. Nicolas, and Fauré's Requiem. The Philadelphia Inquirer review declared KSB's 2003 performance in Bach's St. Matthew Passion with the Choral Arts Society of Philadelphia at Verizon Hall to be “excellent.”

KSB has sung with the Philadelphia Orchestra, the Opera Company of Philadelphia, and the Philadelphia Singers, and in venues such as the Perelman Theater at the Kimmel Center for the Performing Arts, the Academy of Music, and the Mann Center for the Performing Arts. Other notable venues include the Manaus Opera House in Brazil, the Hanoi Opera House in Vietnam, the Petronas Philharmonic Hall in Malaysia, La Madeline in France, and Hall Bulgaria. KSB has also performed in Alaska, Canada, South Africa, Japan, Thailand, Cambodia, Australia, Monaco, Germany, Austria, and Chile. The Boychoir has been the guest choir for the July 4 celebrations in the US Embassies of Tokyo, Kuala Lumpur, Vienna, and Sofia.

The Keystone State Boychoir is part of the Commonwealth Youthchoirs (CY), a non profit organization that serves over 600 children. Its mission is to transform the lives of young people through the power of making music together. CY is made of four different programs: the Keystone State Boychoir, the Pennsylvania Girlchoir, Find Your Instrument! (an outreach program in underserved schools), and Good Mornin' Music (early childhood music program). Founded in 2001 by Joseph P. Fitzmartin and Steven M. Fisher, CY offers its members outstanding choral music education and performance opportunities that foster leadership, character, and self-discipline.

On December 23, 2009, the Keystone State Boychoir became the first choir to sing in Antarctica when they performed for a holiday party at Frei Base, King George Island. As a result, they are also the first choir ever to sing on all seven continents.

== Joseph Fitzmartin ==
Joseph P. Fitzmartin
- Born: 1943 (age 82–83); Philadelphia, Pennsylvania
- Genres: American composer and arranger

Joseph P. Fitzmartin (born in Philadelphia, 1943) is an American composer and arranger. He is one of the founders and the music director of the Keystone State Boychoir as well as choral director at the William Penn Charter School in Philadelphia.

His Concert Mass for symphony orchestra and choir, had its world premiere at Carnegie Hall and has since been performed at the Sydney Opera House, in Berlin, and in Russia by the Novgorod Symphony. Following an international composition competition, he was awarded a grant from the Basel Boys Choir of Switzerland to compose a major work for an international celebration of youth choirs. The work featured the German text of the poet Hanns Dieter Hüsch and continues to be performed throughout that country.
