= Alexander Melnikov (pianist) =

Russian pianist (born 1973)

Alexander Markovich Melnikov
- Александр Маркович Мельников
- Born: 1973 (age 52–53)
- Education: Moscow Conservatory
- Occupation: Pianist

Alexander Markovich Melnikov (Russian: Александр Маркович Мельников; born 1973) is a Russian pianist.

== Life ==
His grandmother was the Soviet pianist and composer Zara Levina. Melnikov graduated from the Moscow Conservatory under Lev Naumov. His most formative musical moments in Moscow include his early encounter with Sviatoslav Richter, who thereafter regularly invited him to festivals in Russia and France. He was awarded prizes at competitions as the Robert Schumann International Competition for Pianists and Singers in Zwickau (1989) and the Queen Elisabeth Music Competition in Brussels (1991).

== Performances ==
Known for his often-unusual musical and programmatic decisions, Melnikov discovered a career-long interest in historical performance practice at an early age. His major influences in this field include harpsichordists Andreas Staier and Alexei Lubimov, with whom he collaborated on numerous projects. Melnikov performs regularly with period ensembles as Concerto Köln and the Akademie für Alte Musik Berlin.

Together with Staier, Melnikov developed a programme that contrasts excerpts from Bach's Well-Tempered Clavier with Shostakovich's 24 Preludes and Fugues. In chamber music, he has collaborated with cellists Alexander Rudin and Jean-Guihen Queyras, and baritone Georg Nigl, among others.

As a soloist, Melnikov has performed with orchestras such as the Royal Concertgebouw Orchestra, Gewandhausorchester Leipzig, Philadelphia Orchestra, NDR Sinfonieorchester, HR-Sinfonieorchester, Russian National Orchestra, Munich Philharmonic, Rotterdam Philharmonic, BBC Philharmonic, Sydney Symphony Orchestra, and the NHK Symphony, under conductors such as Mikhail Pletnev, Teodor Currentzis, Charles Dutoit, Paavo Järvi and Valery Gergiev.

Melnikov was the 2013/14 Artist-in-Residence at the Muziekgebouw in Amsterdam. This season began with Melnikov's debut at the BBC Proms with the Warsaw Philharmonic under Antoni Wit, followed by performances in the season-opening concerts of the Czech Philharmonic under Jiří Bělohlávek. Further musical partners of the season include the Mahler Chamber Orchestra, Freiburger Barockorchester, Amsterdam Sinfonietta, Seattle Symphony, Utah Symphony, Auckland Philharmonia and New Zealand Symphony. Melnikov's solo engagements took him to such venues as the Maison symphonique de Montreal, Wigmore Hall in London, DeSingel in Antwerp and the Mozarteum Salzburg, as well as to concert halls in Osaka, Nagoya and Tokyo.

== Recordings ==
Melnikov's association with the label Harmonia Mundi arose through his regular recital partner, violinist Isabelle Faust, and in 2010 their complete recording of the Beethoven sonatas for violin and piano won both a Gramophone Award and Germany's ECHO Klassik Prize. Their CD featuring chamber works of Weber was released in January 2013. In 2014, he joined with Jean-Guihen Queyras in releasing an album of Beethoven's complete works for cello and piano on the Harmonia Mundi label.

Melnikov's recording of the complete Preludes and Fugues by Shostakovich was awarded the BBC Music Magazine Award, Choc de classica and the Jahrespreis der Deutschen Schallplattenkritik. In 2011, it was also named by the BBC Music Magazine as one of the “50 Greatest Recordings of All Time.” Additionally, Melnikov's discography features works by Brahms, Rachmaninoff and Scriabin.

== Awards ==
- Named Honoured Artist of Russian Federation (1999)
- BBC Radio 3 New Generation Artist (2000–2002)
- Triumph (Russia) (2002, 2008)
- Classics Today (2005, 2006, 2008, 2009)
- Editor's Choice Gramophone (2006)
- Diapason d'Or (2007, 2013)
- Gramophone Critic's Choice (2009)
- BBC Music Choice award (2010)
- Choix France Musique (2010)
- Preis der deutschen Schallplattenkritik (2010, 2013)
- Echo Klassik (2010)
- Choc de classica del'annee (2010)
- Gramophone Award (2010)
- Grammy (nominee) (2010)
- BBC Music Magazine Awards (2011)
