= Bundeswettbewerb Gesang =

German classical singing competition

The German national competition Bundeswettbewerb Gesang Berlin was inaugurated in 1966 as a competition for solo singing. Beginning in 1979, it has been held annually, for the categories musical theatre and chanson in uneven years, for opera, operetta and concert singing in even years. The patron of the competition is the mayor of Berlin, where the competition is organized and held by the association Bundeswettbewerb Gesang Berlin.

The competition supports young singers in German-speaking countries who have to display varied repertory. They have to be of German nationality and finished school in Germany. The final rounds are held in public in Berlin, where also concerts of the winners are presented in the city's music theatres. The prize money of around 50,000 Euro comes from the mayor of Berlin for the first prize in the main competition, and additionally from the Deutscher Bühnenverein, Berlin opera houses, foundations and private sponsors for the other prizes.

== Recipients ==
=== Musical / chanson ===
Among the recipients were:

- Tom Beck (2001)
- Adrian Becker (1997)
- Katja Berg (2001)
- Antonia Bill (2011)
- Winnie Böwe (2001)
- Vera Bolten (1995, 1997, 1999)
- Rasmus Borkowski (2003)
- Robin Brosch (1987)
- Tatjana Clasing (1983)
- Krisha Dalke (2005)
- Jana Werner (1991)
- Kinga Dobay (1999)
- Gisa Flake (2009)
- Michael Frowin (1993)
- Julia Gámez Martin (2009)
- Andreas Gergen (1997)
- Holger Hauer (1987)
- Alen Hodzovic (1999)
- Milica Jovanović (2007)
- Sebastian Krämer (2001, 2003)
- Katharine Mehrling (1995)
- Maike Katrin Merkel (2001, 2003)
- Christian Alexander Müller (2001)
- Max Raabe (1987)
- Lars Redlich (2007)
- Uli Scherbel (1995)
- Bodo Wartke (1999, 2001)
- Christiane Weber (2001)
- Nicky Wuchinger (2009, 2011)

=== Opera / operetta / concert ===
Among the recipients were:

- Lioba Braun (1986)
- Björn Bürger (2012)
- Ingeborg Danz (1986)
- Albert Dohmen (1976)
- Stella Doufexis (1994)
- Mojca Erdmann (1992, 1994, 2002)
- Christof Fischesser (2000)
- Christina Gerstberger (1998)
- Dietrich Henschel (1988)
- Claudia Mahnke (1994)
- Eleonore Marguerre (2000)
- Nadja Michael (1990, 1994)
- Hanno Müller-Brachmann (1994, 1996)
- Marlis Petersen (1990)
- Christoph Prégardien (1978)
- Thomas Quasthoff (1984, 1986)
- Maria Radner (2006)
- Detlef Roth (1990)
- Christine Schäfer (1988)
- Andreas Schmidt (1982)
- Wolfgang Schöne (1968)
- Barbara Senator (2004)
- Doris Soffel (1972)
- Caroline Stein (1990)
- Iris Vermillion (1986)
- Michael Volle (1990)
- Sebastian Wartig (2014)
- Bernd Weikl (1968)
