= Basel Boys Choir =

Knabenkantorei Basel
- Boy's Choir
- Origin: Switzerland, Basel
- Founded: 1927
- Artistic Director: Oliver Rudin
- Website: www.knabenkantorei.ch

The Basel Boys Choir (Knabenkantorei Basel [KKB]) is a boys' choir based in Basel, Switzerland; it grew out of the boys' choir of the Protestant Church of Basel-City, founded by Hermann Ulbrich in 1927. Today the choir is non-denominational. They sing both sacred and secular works. The choir has been under the leadership of Oliver Rudin since 2017.

In addition, the choir has been invited to participate in important music festivals, including the Lucerne Festival under James Conlon, Mario Venzago, Riccardo Chailly and Mariss Jansons, the European Music Festival in Berlin under Roland Bader, the International Festival of Boys Choirs in Poznań (Poland), as well as festivals in Nancy, Maastricht, Venice, Basel, and the Schubert Choir Festival in Vienna in 1997. The Basel Boys Choir is also the host choir of the well-known and highly successful European Festival of Youth Choirs (Europäisches Jugendchorfestival, EJCF).

== Structure ==
The choir consists of approximately 45 unchanged and 35 changed voices. The changed voices are, as a rule, former trebles and altos who have been in the choir for at least a year. The singers dedicate a considerable amount of their free time to the choir: in addition to rehearsals, there are church services, concerts, concert tours, radio and television appearances as well as CD recordings. A choir camp takes place each year for the purpose of learning repertoire.

== Awards ==
- CIMCF 2022 (Men's Choir of the KKB): 1. Place, 93/100 Points, Youth Choral Competition
- CIMCF 2022 (Men's Choir of the KKB): Winner "Most Entertaining Performance"

== Repertoire ==
The choir's a cappella repertoire ranges from Renaissance to contemporary music (Miskinis, Tormis). Performances of oratorios, masses, and cantatas by Bach, Handel, Mozart, Mendelssohn, Britten, and Rossini are the choir's main focus. Additionally, the boys' choir has participated in the Lucerne Festival as well as the following opera performances in Basel: Die Zauberflöte, Tosca, Mefistofele, Carmen, La Bohème, Carmina Burana und Macbeth. Soloists from the KKB could also be heard in performances of Die Zauberflöte in theaters in Bern, Basel and Freiburg im Breisgau.

== History ==
=== Founding and first year ===
The founding of the choir goes back to the initiative of the then-school teacher Hermann Ulbrich, who sang in the Basel Bach Choir and attended the Thomanerchor's many concerts under Karl Straube in Basel. Ulbrich turned to Ernst Lipp, a fellow singer in the Bach Choir and president of the Kommission für den Unterricht in der Biblischen Geschichte ("Commission for the Teaching of Biblical History", KUBG), and suggested that he found a singing school for the preservation of choral tradition that was in the service of the church, but independent of the YMCA. Lipp passed the idea on to the consistory, where it found little support. Nevertheless, the KUBG approved the charter, which Ulbrich had previously written together with Lipp and YMCA youth secretary Jakob Staehelin, and he took responsibility for the still-to-be-founded choir.

At the beginning of June, 1927, Ulbrich sent out advertising for the Choirboys of the Protestant Church of Basel-City, institutionalized in May. On June 15, 1927, the first informational meeting took place with 33 interested boys; this date is taken to be the KKB's founding date. The first rehearsal took place on August 19, 1927 in the Bishop's residence of the Basel Münster; soon, though, they moved due to the heating problems in the Katharine Chapel of the cloister. The first public appearance occurred on October 30, 1927, as a part of a church service in the Martinskirche, but it was such a fiasco (the 19 boys who did show up sang very poorly) that Ulbrich threatened to resign. Lipp encouraged him to continue, however, and on Christmas, 1927, the choir enthralled the congregation of a church service in the Theodorskirche.

Their third appearance, a Bach concert in April 1928, was also their last before a long summer break, during which a large advertising campaign was carried out to ensure the continued existence of the group. Adolf Hamm, an organist at the Münster, played an important role in the campaign; he ensured that after the successful campaign, the choir, which had grown to 63 boys, was able to perform the Christmas Oratorio for Christmas, 1928, and a Passion concert for Easter, 1929. In August, 1929, a working party was founded on the occasion of the first parents' evening, and Jakob Staehelin was elected its first president, making him also the first president of the KKB.

In August, 1929, the Chorschüler der evangelisch-reformierten Kirche Basel-Stadt ("Choir students of the Protestant Church of Basel-City"), which consisted of former choirboys whose voices had changed, was founded. The expansion of the choir to include changed voices had already been considered by January 1928, but the proposal did not resonate with the older students; the consistory also refused it because of the unintentional competition it would create with the adult community and church choirs. Nevertheless, the choir students appeared at Hamm's Free Organ Recital in December, 1928, but the group was ultimately unable to survive (for the time being).

On December 22, 1929, the boys' choir organized their first full concert: a Christmas liturgy at the Münster with the locally renowned soprano Helene Sandreuter, which was a big success.

The quality of the singing, which was still modest in comparison with large boarding school choirs, was such a cause for concern among the choir parents that, after a weak appearance in a church service in Kleinhüningen, they demanded that the choir refrain from further public appearances for the time being. For that reason, the rehearsal time was extended from 75 to 120 minutes and divided into 60 minutes each of singing technique and choir rehearsal after the summer break in 1930. Meanwhile, the choir had grown to 88 boys, which necessitated changing the rehearsal space from St. John's Chapel to a larger and considerably more expensive location in Nadelberg by the Peterskirche. In December, 1930, the choir celebrated its 25th appearance. Their quality and proficiency had gradually increased, and soloists were already emerging from the choir.

In 1931, Ulbrich introduced a hierarchical group system inspired by the Scouts; following the Meistersinger model, singers could advance from Schüler (beginner) to Sänger (singer), and finally Meister (master). Additional elements, such as patches and a Sängerspiegel ("singer's mirror", equivalent to the Scout Promise) were incorporated. How long this hierarchical group system survived is unknown. However, everyone participated in all of the public appearances. The idea of a choir camp, which originated in 1930, was re-adopted by president Staehelin in 1932, and a camp was held from October 3–13 in Greifensee that year. The fifth anniversary, which occurred in 1932, was celebrated with a large family night with a lottery and singing.

One problem that came up again and again between 1930 and 1933 was the variation in the number of singers and the quality of the choir: Ulbrich was able to keep some of the members of the choir from leaving and train them for some promising performances, but the best singers quickly fell victim to their voices changing and had to leave; meanwhile, Ulbrich needed to recruit and train new boys. Furthermore, Schola Cantorum Basiliensis planned to form a children's choir, which meant further competition. For this reason, an "educational department" (now known as "Choir 101") was created to avoid any further reduction in quality. Talented singers then still came into the choir right away, and the others went through the educational department. A further improvement came in 1933 with vocal training, for which they were able to employ Helene Sandreuter. The rehearsal space was changed from the expensive location in Nadelberg to the church. At the end of the year, Jakob Staehelin stepped down as president due to having to move from Basel; his cousin Hans Staehelin took over his position.

The years leading up to the Second World War were marked by solid efforts for improvement. Ulbrich and Sandreuter, the voice teacher, fell in love and were married on July 11, 1936. Also in 1936, Alfred Courvoisier assumed the presidency. In December, 1938, the choir undertook a half-hour radio program for the first time. The high point of the year, however, had already taken place on May 12, 1938: their participation in the premiere of Arthur Honegger's Jeanne d'Arc au Bûcher at Theater Basel with Ida Rubinstein as Jeanne and the chamber orchestra Basler Kammerorchester under the direction of Paul Sacher. A repeat performance with the boys' choir took place at the Swiss national exposition in Zürich in 1939.

=== Crisis during the Second World War ===
After the outbreak of World War II, rehearing became increasingly more difficult, and in 1940 the rehearsal space changed yet again, first to the City of Basel Music Academy, then to the kindergarten at the Basel Mission. Since Ulbrich had to serve in the military until July, 1940, Emil Herrmann and Helene Sandreuter were entrusted with the interim direction of the choir, leading to temporary cessation of voice lessons. Meanwhile, the size of the choir had shrunk by 25 percent. Ulbrich, who was still on duty, developed a Christmas liturgy with the choir. In 1941, a joint performance with the Schola Cantorum took place. Ernst Lipp, who had been intimately involved with the development of the choir since its founding, died that same year. In 1942 and 1943, interest in joining the choir fell dramatically from its generally high levels, and the choir had only 16 members in May, 1943, who were not of a high enough quality to give a successful concert with the Schola Cantorum at the Barfüsserkirche ("Barefeet Church"). Fortunately, by 1944 the choir had grown back to 30 members. In May, 1945, the choir organized a thanksgiving service on the occasion of the end of the war.

=== Expansion and Ulbrich's last year ===
In the years after the war, the number of singers gradually increased. Ulbrich and Sandreuter, now married, could once again fully dedicate themselves to the choirboys. In 1945, the choir was already ready to perform for the premiere of Unser Vater by Walter Müller von Kulm with the Bach Choir. In 1949, the choir participated in the 17th "church music day," organized by the Swiss League of Church Music. In 1950, the minister Alfred Studer replaced Courvoisier as president. That same year, the choir returned to their original rehearsal space, the Bishop's residence, where the KKB still rehearses to this day.

On June 22, 1952, the choir celebrated its 25-year anniversary with a special church service in Münster. The composer Rudolf Moser composed a setting of the 29th psalm for the choir. Changed voices, drawn from former trebles and altos, were brought into the choir. The enrollment of new singers was expanded to include students from the second grade and older, allowing them to compete strongly with the Scouts. In 1956, there was another change of president; Studer stepped down because he had to move and handed the position over to the composer Rudolf Moser. In 1959, after the success of a concert with organist Hans Balmer, the choir performed several contemporary works for Swiss radio.

In 1958, the changed voices were finally allowed to join the unchanged voices; the KUBG approved a trial period for their inclusion. A name change was also discussed, but put off until after the trial period. On August 23, 1958, the first rehearsal with eight changed voices took place, and Ulbrich announced in January, 1959, that their inclusion would be made permanent. However, since no tenors could be found until 1962, the deepest boys' voices and the voices still in the process of changing were used to sing the tenor parts. In 1959, the previously discussed name change finally took place: the choir became the Evangelische Kantorei Basel ("Basel Protestant Choir") and became directly controlled by the consistory.

In 1960, the choir was shaken by President Moser's accidental death; his successor was Rudolf Massini. In the 1960s, Ulbrich handed over some of his responsibilities: his wife, Helene Sandreuter, and his son, Markus Ulbrich, along with Kurt Tschirren, an employee in the administration, assisted him in leading the choir, and Markus Ulbrich and Tschirren Kurse worked in the educational department.

In 1967 the "mutant group," a group of singers undergoing a voice change, was formed with the purpose of productively using the mandatory time off from the choir for vocal training and learning repertoire to better prepare themselves for vocal maturity. Beginning in 1967, the choir started advertising for all elementary school grades. In 1968, the older singers (possibly inspired by the Protests of 1968) demanded the representation in a working committee, which they were finally granted.

=== Establishment as an independent organization ===
In February, 1970, Hermann Ulbrich and Helene Sandreuter announced their resignations from their positions with the choir effective at the end of June. The leadership of the choir was taken over by their son Markus along with two other former choirboys, Kurt Tschirren and Werner Schniepper. Markus Ulbrich placed a heavy emphasis on the works of Heinrich Schütz, with performances of The Seven Words of Jesus Christ on the Cross (1791), St. John Passion (1972), and History of the Resurrection (1974). Tschirren quit in 1972, whereupon Schiepper took over his responsibilities and Hans Peter Oppliger took over Tschirren's responsibilities.

Between 1970 and 1972 there was intense discussion regarding how the choir should be legally organized in the future. Various possibilities, including a merger with the YMCA, were seen as disadvantageous. Finally, they decided to establish the choir as an independent organization in order to separate it from the consistory. The foundational meeting took place on February 2, 1972 and resulted in the election of Max Huldi as a replacement for Massini. At the parents' meeting, yet another name change was decided upon which was in keeping with its recent shift toward Ecumenism and also conveyed its character as a boys' choir, in spite of the changed voices. This goal was accomplished with the name Basel Boys Choir (Knabenkantorei Basel, KKB).

The KKB then experienced a tremendous growth: as an independent organization, they were able to ask for financial support from a greater variety of institutions; furthermore, many members and patrons contributed to the improved financial situation, allowing them, for example, to hire more qualified teachers. Public relations were enormously strengthened and improved, and the choir got a logo by holding a public competition. In the summer of 1973, their first concert tour took place in the Bernese Oberland and their first record, a collection of choral and organ works by Felix Mendelssohn, was made. In 1974, a tour of the Netherlands followed with the help of the organist Hans Peter Aeschlimann, and the KKB became a supporting member of the Gesellschaft für das Gute und Gemeinnützige Basel ("Society for a Good and Charitable Basel"). Their first television appearances took place in 1975 and 1976 on Südwestrundfunk.

In 1974, the Gregorian Chant Circle was founded, which fosters continued training in church music, both for older current choir members as well as alumni. Ulbrich pushed for the improvement of educational opportunities: bassist Stefan Kramp was hired as a voice teacher, and the educational department became "Choir 101", which it remains today.

In November, 1980, Hermann Ulbrich, the founder of the choir, died at the age of 77; consequently, Markus Ulbrich retired for professional and personal reasons at the end of the year. For the first time, a commission was formed to search for a new choir leader. In the end, the choice was between German cantor Klaus Knall and the leader of the Muttenz youth music school, Beat Raaflaub. The commission unanimously voted for Knall, who took over leadership of the choir in 1981.

=== Turning point and change of director ===
Upon Knall taking over, Schniepper stepped down as administrative director. In 1982, the KKB found itself in deeper financial trouble; the Basel-city canton revoked the KKB's subsidies. Klaus Knall himself stepped down at the end of the year for professional reasons as well as a lack of time. Beat Raaflaub, who just two years earlier had lost the position to Knall, became the new musical director. In 1983 and 1984, various sources of support were withdrawn, and as a result the organization had to be restructured: now, the board took direct control over the choir. In 1984, Gerhard Winkler took over the presidency from Max Huldi after he resigned. Benjamin Britten's St. Nicolas was performed at Basel's Martinskirche and in Reinach, and in June, 1985, the KKB made the first German-language recording of the Britten cantata.

=== Raaflaub's leadership ===
In September, 1986, soloists from the KKB participated in a production of The Magic Flute for the first time at the Theater Basel, and later in Bern and in Freiburg im Breisgau. The boys' choir participated in the performance of Gustav Mahler's Eighth Symphony from October 13 to 17 at the Festival of European Music in Berlin under Roland Bader; in November, Mozart's Requiem and Grabmusik were performed by the whole choir.

In 1987, the choir held a lavish celebration for its 60-year anniversary: on January 10, the Vienna Boys' Choir sang a sold out joint performance with the KKB in Basel's Stadtcasino. At the end of February, the choir was invited to the Festival International de Chant Choral in Nantes. The large jubilee weekend, with choirs from throughout Europe and more than 600 participants from the Basel area, took place on May 16 and 17. This weekend festival can be seen as a kind of pilot project for the European Festival of Youth Choirs (EJCF), which would first take place in 1992. In August, the KKB appeared in the Lucerne Festival and participated in a performance of Leonard Bernstein's Chichester Psalms. To conclude the year, a tour took place in the Bernese Oberland to commemorate the choir's first concert tour.

In November, 1988, Carl Philipp Emanuel Bach's Magnificat and Mozart's Coronation Mass were performed. In 1990, the KKB performed with the Charivari at the Carnival of Basel, after which they returned to the Theater Basel for a performance of Alban Berg's Wozzeck, and they also performed Frank Martin's Danse Macabre in Münster. In May, 1991, the boys' choir sang on the occasion of the 700 year anniversary session of the Federal Assembly of Switzerland at the Federal Palace of Switzerland in Bern. At the beginning of October, the choir was able to make a scheduled trip to sing in Saint Petersburg, although only weeks before, Mikhail Gorbachev had attempted to stop it.

In 1992, a scheduled three week concert tour of the United States suffered a financial setback as a result of the withdrawal of two large sponsors, and had to be cancelled as a result. In response, it was agreed at the yearly general meeting that a financial reservoir needed to be developed that could weather a bad economy, namely a concert tour endowment. In May, the first European Festival of Youth Choirs took place; the KKB, with Winkler as its business manager and Raaflaub as its musical director, was heavily involved with the planning and execution of the event. In 1993, the choir participated in more than 40 opera performances (including Puccini's Tosca and Boito's Mefistofele) at the Theater Basel. In May, the US concert tour was able to take place, shortened by a week and accompanied by legislator Hans-Rudolf Striebel. The first KKB concerts outside of Europe took place in such cities as New York and Philadelphia.

In March, 1994, the KKB performed and recorded Carl Philipp Emanuel Bach's St. Mark Passion, rediscovered in 1985. This was their first globally distributed recording; the double-CD release was distributed by Ars Musici. In April, Gerhard Winkler stepped down as president. His successor was Jürg Rauschenbach. In 1995, the boys' choir embarked on a concert tour of Germany, traveling through the cities of Ulm, Wiesbaden, Göttingen, Hannover and Frankfurt am Main; the choir also participated in the second EJCF. In 1996, a concert tour through Finland and Estonia took place followed by a choir camp in Turku.

In 1997, the boys' choir celebrated its 70th year with the premiere performance of Joseph Fitzmartin's cantata Ich möcht' ein Clown sein ("I would like to be a clown", text by Hanns Dieter Hüsch). In April, a celebratory church service took place in Münster, and in May, the choir participated in a youth culture gala in the Stadtcasino Basel with other youth performing groups in the area. To conclude the year, three sold-out performances of Joseph Haydn's The Seasons took place in November. That same year, assistant director Rolf Herter stepped down; he was replaced by a German director named Johannes Tolle. The anniversary concert tour took place in February 1998, taking the KKB through South Africa for two weeks. In May, the choir participated in the EJCF one more time. In October, Raaflaub was awarded the Bumberniggel prize from the anniversary foundation of the UBS.

=== Brazilian Tour and Raaflaub's last year ===
In 1999, there followed a concert tour through the Czech Republic with appearances in Brno, Hradec Králové, Pardubice, and Prague, as well as performances of Bach's Christmas Oratorio in December. In June, 2000, the choir traveled around the German cities of Berlin (with an appearance in the Berlin Cathedral) and Potsdam as well as the Polish city of Poznań, and at the end of the year they performed Mendelssohn's Elijah. On January 11, 2001, the boys' choir took part in a performance of Mahler's Eighth Symphony (Symphony of a Thousand) involving a thousand performers, including 14 other choirs. Johannes Tolle stepped down as assistant director; he was replaced by Jürg Siegrist, a former member of the choir. In September, the choirboys participated in a performance of Mahler's Third Symphony during a Swiss concert series; other engagements at the Lucerne Festival followed in subsequent years. At the end of the year, Britten's St. Nicholas cantata was performed in collaboration with Kantorei St. Arbogast.

The choir's 75 year anniversary was celebrated with a three-week concert tour through Brazil in the summer of 2002. The Brazilian tour was the longest and most successful in the choir's history; the KKB was enthusiastically received in 13 cities and reached tens of millions of viewers in an appearance in the city of Riversul, which was broadcast on national television. In the Fall, the choir held its first ten-day choir camp in the former Maloja Palace in the Swiss district of Maloja; originally planned as a one-time camp, the KKB returned to Maloja for its Fall camp every year until 2007. In December, 2002, the KKB performed Handel's Coronation Anthems and the Chichester Psalms, choreographed by Parwin Hadinia in the Theater Basel, for its 75th birthday. The concert was so successful that in June, 2003, an extra performance followed in the Schauspielhaus Zürich.

Jürg Rauschenbach, who was intimately involved in the execution and the success of the large concert tours through South Africa and Brasil, stepped down as president in 2002. Kuno Hämisegger, a banker, was chosen as his successor. Around the same time, Rolf Herter, who had resigned as Assistant Director in 1997, returned to former position, which he continues to hold along with Siegrist to this day. In 2003, the KKB took part in the first Venezia in Musica international choir festival in Venice and Jesolo and Performed Bach's Johannes Passion for Easter, 2004. In May, 2005, a concert tour through Bulgaria took place, during which the choir became the first foreign choir to be allowed perform in the orthodox Easter celebration at Alexander Nevsky Cathedral in Sofia. In January and April of that same year, the choir performed the original version of Gioacchino Rossini's Petite messe solennelle. In December 2005, an additional performance of Britten's cantata St. Nicolas and Arthur Honegger's A Christmas Cantata with the Basel Girls' Choir were successfully brought to the stage. Three years of fall concert tours of Germany took the KKB through Calw, Limburg, Göttingen and Rotterdam (Netherlands) in 2004, Nederhof, Wiesbaden, Wirges and Luxembourg in 2006, and Frankfurt (Oder), Saalfeld, Jena, and Sondershausen in 2007.

=== New Director ===
After the concert season was over, Raaflaub announced his resignation, effective February 2007. As in 1980, a search commission was formed. The final choice was Markus Teutschbein. Raaflaub's crowning achievement as director of the choir was two sold-out performances of Felix Mendelssohn's oratorio St. Paul. During the months immediately following Raaflaub's resignation, assistant director Herter took partial responsibility for leading the choir, while Teutschbein stayed in Germany.

Teutschbein has been the KKB's musical director from February 2007 until Autumn 2016, and his first joint project with the choir was to organize the sixth EJCF in May 2007, in Basel. In September, the choir appeared in the Jugendkulturfestival Basel ("Basel Youth Culture Festival") as well as The Glue's Lala Blabla Pomme d'Adam Festival. In January 2008, Handel's Messiah was performed with the Berner Freitagsakademie in the original English with great success; in March, there followed a concert tour through Hungary with four more Messiah concerts, one of which took place in Matthias Church in Budapest. In the fall, the choirboys participated in an open-air production of Orff's Carmina Burana. In October 2008, the changed voices performed Luigi Cherubini's Requiem in D Minor for men's chorus in the Basel Münster and in the music hall of Stadtcasino Basel; the concert was rounded out by César Franck's Psalm 150 and Georges Bizet's Te Deum.

Bach's St. John Passion was performed three times in March 2009; after two concerts in the Basel Münster and the Arlesheim Dome, the KKB opened its 37th summer concert season in the Bürgel Monastery in Jena. In early summer 2009, a concert tour through France took place. There, the choir performed the Lyon Cathedral in Lyon, as well as in collaboration with the Petits Chanteurs de Saint-Marc (featured in the movie Les Choristes) and gave other performances in Nîmes, Carpentras and Besançon. Shortly thereafter, the KKB appeared in three joint concerts with the Freiburg Cathedral Boys' Choir and the Chœur de Garçons de Mulhouse. In 2011 the Requiem by Wolfgang Amadeus Mozart was performed, in 2012 Beethoven's C-Major Mass followed. In 2014 the Knabenkantorei Basel performed the late version of Johann Sebastian Bach's St. Mark Passion reconstructed by Alexander Grychtolik. In the following year several concerts with the oratorio Elias by Felix Mendelssohn Bartholdy took place.

From autumn 2016 to summer 2017 Rolf Herter conducted the choir on an interim basis. In summer 2017 Oliver Rudin took over the direction of the choir.

== Partnerships ==
Alongside sporadic collaborations with Theater Basel and various orchestras, such as the Basel Symphony Orchestra and the Basel Sinfonietta, plus ensembles from outside Basel such as the Bern Freitagsakademie, as well as with various guest choirs, there were also regular collaborations with the Basel Girls' Choir in the past. A collaboration with the Collegium Musicum Basel Orchestra was planned in 2007, but both organizations decided to cancel again in 2009.

== Discography ==
=== LPs ===
- 1973–Felix Mendelssohn: "Chor- und Orgelwerke" (Pelca, PSR 40 585; out of print)
- 1976–Baroque Christmas songs: "Ein Kind geborn zu Bethlehem" ("A Child Born in Bethlehem", KKB (private label))
- 1977–secular Renaissance songs: "Nun fanget an, ein guts Lied zu singen" ("Now begin to sing a good song", Pelca, PSR 40 617)
- 1979–Heinrich Schütz: "Musikalische Exequien und Psalm 136" ("Musikalische Exequien and Psalm 136", EMI, 065-03 828)
- 1980–Johann Sebastian Bach: "Kantaten Nr. 82a und Nr. 161" ("Cantatas 82a and 161", EMI, 065-43 076)
- 1980–Johann Sebastian Bach: "Kantaten Nr. 179 und Nr. 177" ("Cantatas 179 and 177", EMI, 065-43 077)
- 1985–Benjamin Britten: "St. Nikolaus-Kantate" ("St. Nicolas", KKB (private label), CS 558-3)
- 1987–various composers: "60 Jahre KKB – Jubiläumsprogramm ("The KKB's 60 Year Anniversary Program", KKB (private label), CS 572 K, only available internally)

=== Cassettes ===
- 1978–Bach/Brahms/Reger: "Geistliche Motetten" ("Sacred Motets", KKB (private label), EDT 80031; out of print)
- 1985–div. Komponisten: "Knabenkantorei in concert" (KKB (private label), AZ 1014 MC; out of print)
- 1986–Wolfgang Amadeus Mozart: "Requiem und Grabmusik" ("Requiem und Grabmusik", KKB (private label), only available internally)
- 1987–various composers: "60 Jahre KKB – Jubiläumsprogramm" ("The KKB's 60 Year Anniversary Program", KKB (private label), CS 572 K, only available internally)
- 1987–various composers: "Festkonzert vom 17. Mai 1987" ("Special Concert on May 17, 1987", KKB (private label), only available internally)
- 1989–Mozart/C.P.E. Bach: "Krönungsmesse und Magnificat" ("Coronation Mass and Magnificat", KKB (private label), only available internally)
- 1989–various composers: "Musik zu Weihnachten – Weihnachtslieder und Motetten" ("Music for Christmas – Christmas Songs and Motets", KKB (private label))
- 1992–various composers: "Motetten grosser Meister/Schweizer Volksliedkantate" ("Motets of the Great Masters/Swiss Folk Song Cantata", KKB (private label))

=== CDs ===
- 1989–various composers: "Musik zu Weihnachten – Weihnachtslieder und Motetten" ("Music for Christmas – Christmas Songs and Motets", KKB (private label))
- 1991–Johann Sebastian Bach: "Weihnachtsoratorium I-VI" ("Christmas Oratorio I-VI", KKB (private label), only available internally)
- 1992–various composers: "Motetten grosser Meister/Schweizer Volksliedkantate" ("Motets of the Great Masters/Swiss Folk Song Cantata", KKB (private label))
- 1994–C.P.E. Bach: "Markuspassion" ("St. Mark Passion", Ars Musici)
- 1994–Mendelssohn/Rheinberger: "Psalm 95 und Weihnachtskantate" ("Psalm 95 and Christmas Cantata", KKB (private label))
- 1996–Mozart/Reicha: "Litanei und Te Deum" ("Litany und Te Deum", KKB (private label)/SRDRS, KKB-006, only available internally)
- 1996–Martin/Beethoven: "In Terra Pax und Friedenskantate" ("In Terra Pax and Peace Cantata", private label, KKB-007)
- 1997–various composers: "Geistliche Vokalmusik" ("Sacred Vocal Music", private label, KKB-008)
- 1999–Telemann/Krebs/Bach/Dudli: "Eine grosse Freude" (private label, KKB-009)
- 2000–various composers: "Highlights" (private label, KKB-010)
- 2000–various composers: "Spirituals + Lieder + Songs" (private label, KKB-011)
- 2000–Johann Sebastian Bach: "Weihnachtsoratorium I, IV-VI" ("Christmas Oratorio I, IV-VI", private label, KKB-012)
- 2001–Felix Mendelssohn: "Elias" (private label, KKB-013)
- 2001–Gustav Mahler: "Sinfonie Nr. 8 in Es-Dur" ("Symphony No. 8 in E-flat major", a.k.a. Symphony of a Thousand, only available internally)
- 2005–various composers: "Tournee-Programm 2005" ("Tour Program 2005", private label, KKB-014)
- 2005–Gioacchino Rossini: "Petite messe solennelle" (private label, PST 05367, only available internally)
- 2005–Honegger/Britten: "Cantate de Noël/Sankt Nikolaus" ("Cantate de Noël/St. Nicolas", Schweizer Radio DRS, only available internally)

=== VHS ===
- 2001–Gustav Mahler: "Sinfonie Nr. 8 in Es-Dur" ("Symphony No. 8 in E-flat major", Telebasel, only available internally)
- 2002–Händel/Bernstein: "Coronation Anthems und Chichester Psalms" ("Coronation Anthems and Chichester Psalms", only available internally)

== Major concerts since 1997 ==
- Dec. 1997: The Seasons (Joseph Haydn)
- Dec. 1999: Christmas Oratorio (Johann Sebastian Bach)
- Nov. 2000: Elijah (Felix Mendelssohn)
- Dec. 2001: St. Nicolas (Benjamin Britten) (unchanged voices only, with the St. Arbogast Choir)
- Nov./Dec. 2002, Jun. 2003: Coronation Anthems (George Frideric Handel), Chichester Psalms (Leonard Bernstein)
- Apr. 2004: St. John Passion (Johann Sebastian Bach)
- Jan./Apr. 2005: Petite messe solennelle (Gioacchino Rossini)
- Dec. 2005: Cantate de Noël (Arthur Honegger) and St. Nicolas (Benjamin Britten)
- Feb. 2007: St. Paul (Felix Mendelssohn)
- Jan./March 2008: The Messiah von Georg Friedrich Händel
- Dec. 2009: Christmas Oratorio (Johann Sebastian Bach)
- Nov. 2010: Die Schöpfung (Joseph Haydn)
- Mar. 2014: Markuspassion (Johann Sebastian Bach, late version (1744), Reconstruction: Alexander F. Grychtolik)
- Sep. 2019: Participation in „Theater im Münster“ for the 1000th anniversary of Basel Minster
- Aug. 2022: Weissagung und Erfüllung (Hans Huber), with Sinfonieorchester Basel, Basler Madrigalisten, and Basler Gesangsverein
- Jan. 2023: Messe in C-Dur (Wolfgang Amadeus Mozart), with Kammerorchester Basel
- Jan. 2023: Requiem, Gabriel Fauré, with Kammerorchester Basel

== Conductors ==
- Hermann Ulbrich (1927–1970)
- Markus Ulbrich (1970–1980)
- Klaus Knall (1980–1983)
- Beat Raaflaub (1983–2007)
- Markus Teutschbein (2007-2016)
- Rolf Herter ad interim (2016–2017)
- Oliver Rudin (since 2017)

== Presidents ==
- Jakob Staehelin (1929–1933)
- Hans Staehelin (1933–1936)
- Alfred Courvoisier (1936–1950)
- Alfred Studer (1950–1956)
- Rudolf Moser (1956–1960)
- Rudolf Massini (1960–1972)
- Max Huldi (1972–1983)
- Gerhard Winkler (1983–1994)
- Jürg Rauschenbach (1994–2003)
- Kuno Hämisegger (2003-2008)
- Werner Schniepper (2008-2017)
- Peter Küng (since 2017)

== Notable alumni ==
- Rainer Brambach, writer
- Michael Feyfar, singer
- Lukas Holliger, playwright, dramaturge, editor
- Michael Koch, actor, director
- Thomas Mattmüller, conductor
- Andreas Meier, conductor
- Hanno Müller-Brachmann, bass-baritone in opera and concert
- Meinert Rahn, geologist, mineralogist
- Félix Rienth, singer
- Oliver Rudin, conductor, singer, composer
