= Beat Raaflaub =

Swiss conductor

Beat Martin Raaflaub (born 19 August 1946 in Winterthur) is a Swiss conductor. He is the brother of Kurt Raaflaub, Professor of Classics and History at Brown University.

He grew up in Basel and Cameroon and studied German and history at the University of Basel where he graduated as a doctor in modern Swiss history in 1977. At the same time, he became a concert singer after having studied with Fritz Näf. Finally, the Basel Conservatory issued Raaflaub the diploma for "Teaching School Music" and "Choir Direction". In 1976 he was nominated Director of the Jugendmusikschule Muttenz near Basel.

Since 1979 he has managed two other choirs as a musical director, the Choir St. Arbogast Muttenz and the Chamber Choir Bülach (Kammerchor Zürcher Unterland). He gives concerts with both choirs in all parts of Switzerland.

In 1983 Raaflaub took over the musical direction of the Basel Boys Choir (Knabenkantorei Basel). Many recordings for radio and television were produced with his choirs. He gave concerts with his Boys Choir in Europe, in the United States, in South Africa and in Brazil. Several CD recordings were produced under his direction.

Additionally, Raaflaub teaches young conductors at the "Music Academy Basel". He also presents regularly the radio show Sing mit at the Swiss Radio DRS. Raaflaub is an important artistic counsellor of the European Youth Choir Festival.
