= Jan Kalivoda =

Czech composer and violinist (1801–1866)

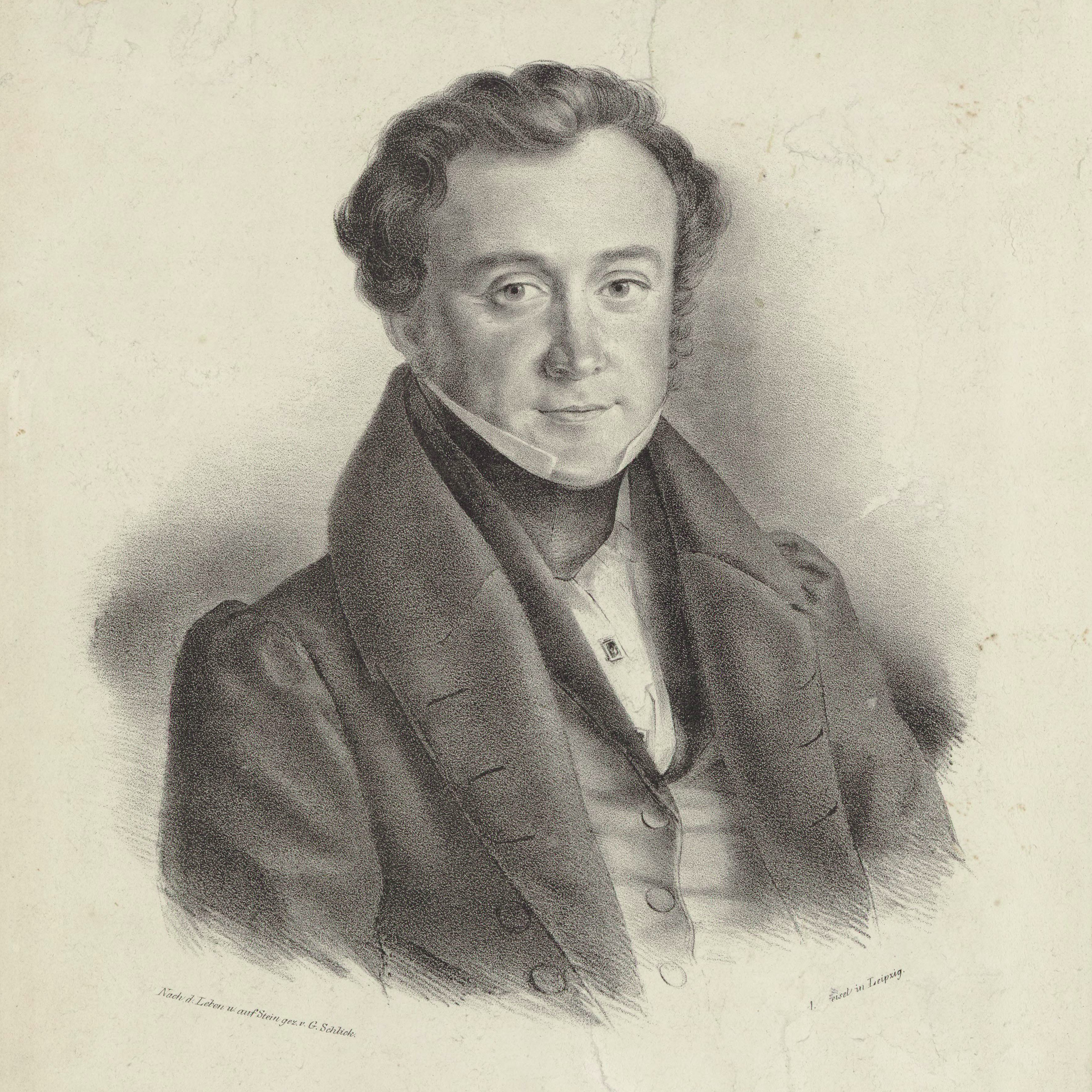
Jan Václav Kalivoda

Jan Křtitel Václav Kalivoda (German: Johann Baptist Wenzel Kalliwoda; 21 February 1801 – 3 December 1866) was a Czech composer, conductor and violinist.

== Life ==
Kalivoda was born in Prague on 21 February 1801. As early as 1811, he started studying violin and composition at the Prague Conservatory. He made his debut as a violinist at the age of 14. Upon completion of his studies he became a member of the Prague Opera Orchestra. His diploma from the Conservatory read "Excellent player solo or in an orchestra...shows great talent in composition." More prosperous tours as a violinist, for instance to Linz and Munich, followed.

Kalivoda lived what appears to have been a stable, hardworking musical life. For more than 40 years, from 1822 to 1865, he held the post of conductor at the court of Prince Karl Egon II of Fürstenberg and his successor in Donaueschingen (where the Danube begins in the Black Forest). His duties there included not only the writing of and care for the music of the court and church, but also the management and conducting of a choir, and annual musical journeys for education. These manifold responsibilities may have foreshortened his life. In any case, he went into retirement in 1865, and a year later he died, of a heart attack in Karlsruhe.

On 15 October 1822, in Prague, he married Operatic soprano Therese Barbara Brunetti (1803–1892). Their son Wilhelm Kalliwoda (1827–1893) continued his father's career, and worked as Kapellmeister for the Baden court in Karlsruhe, also composing (an Impromptu for piano was published as his opus 3 in Leipzig in 1854). During the 1850s he is mentioned by Alan Walker as a conductor at the Lower Rhenish Music Festival.

== Significance ==
Kalivoda "represents a sort of symphonic 'missing link' between Beethoven and Schumann," writes the critic David Hurwitz, founder of Classics Today. "His melodic appeal and rhythmic energy undoubtedly have something to do with his Czech roots...but he also had a genuine understanding of symphonic development and real contrapuntal skill." Hurwitz observes that "as the predominance of minor keys suggests, his music has passion and an emotional depth that recalls Beethoven without ever descending into mere imitation. Part of the reason for his distinctiveness stems from his skill at orchestration."...The symphonic music of Kalliwoda is "thrilling, and it strikingly anticipates or echoes so much of 19th century music--from Berlioz to Dvorák to Wagner, and even Sibelius..."

== Compositions ==
Kalivoda was a highly prolific composer, and was held in high regard during his lifetime by such eminent contemporaries as Robert Schumann. In all, his works number in the hundreds, of which there are about 250 works or sets of works with opus numbers.

His compositions included operas, symphonies, concert overtures—one of them, commissioned for the occasion, was used to close the first concert, in 1842, of the New York Philharmonic —as well as music for piano, piano concertos, concertinos for violin and for oboe, music for the church, lieder, choral music and various other vocal and instrumental works.

== Selected discography ==
- Kalliwoda: 6 Nocturnos for viola and piano. Performed by Ashan Pillai and Michael Endres. Oehms Classics
- Kalliwoda: Overture No. 12; Introduction & Variations for clarinet & orchestra; Introduction & Rondo for horn & orchestra; Symphony No. 3. Performed by Dieter Klöcker (clarinet) & Radovan Vlatkovic (horn) with the Hamburg Symphony conducted by Johannes Moesus. MDG 329 1387-2
- Kalliwoda: Symphonies Nos. 5 & 6. Performed by the Hofkapelle Stuttgart conducted by Frieder Bernius. Orfeo C 677 061
- Kalliwoda: Symphonies Nos. 5 & 7; Overture No. 16. Performed by Das Neue Orchester conducted by Christoph Spering. CPO 777 139-2
- Kalliwoda: String Quartets 1-3 opp. 61, 62 and 90. The Talich Quartet. 2006. Calliope 9357.
- Kalliwoda: Symphonies Nos. 2 & 4; Overture No. 17. Performed by Die Kölner Akademie conducted by Michael Alexander Willens. CPO 777-469-2
- Kalliwoda: Violin Concertinos Nos. 1 & 5; Overtures Nos. 3, 7 & 10. Performed by Die Kölner Akademie conducted by Michael Alexander Willens. CPO 777-692-2
