= La passione di Gesù Cristo =

La passione di Gesù Cristo is a libretto by Pietro Metastasio which was repeatedly set as an azione sacra or oratorio by many composers of the late baroque, Rococo and early classical period.

== Writing and original setting ==
The libretto was written by the imperial poet in Rome on the instruction of Charles VI, Holy Roman Emperor. Court composer Antonio Caldara's original setting of La passione di Gesù Cristo signor nostro was performed on 3 April 1730, as part of Holy Week, in the holy sepulchre of the Hofburgkapelle, the court chapel in the Hofburg in Vienna.

The oratorio marks a departure from the settings of actual Gospel passion narratives such as the Latin Passio Secundum Ioannem of Alessandro Scarlatti to a more theatrical style. The four central roles are S. Pietro, S. Giovanni, Maria Maddalena, Giuseppe d'Arimatea – with John, Mary Magdalene and Joseph of Arimathea answering Peter's questions about the crucifixion.

== Other settings ==
- 1733 Carlo Sodi, Rome.
- 1735 Giovanni Lorenzo Gregori, Lucca.
- 1735 Giuseppe Venturelli, Modena.
- 1736 Michelangiolo Magagni, Florence.
- 1737 Domenico Natale Sarro, Rome.
- 1742 Davide Perez (1711–1778), Palermo.
- 1743 Domenico Valentini, Venice. (music lost)
- 1743 Niccolò Conti, Venice.
- 1747 Giovanni Cordicelli, Rome.
- 1749 Andrea Cornario, Rome.
- 1749 Niccolò Jommelli, La Passione di NS Gesù Cristo, Venice. Which was considered "remarkably well set" by Charles Burney and admired by James Edward Smith.
- 1750 Johann Georg Schürer, Dresden
- 1751 Jan Batista Runcher, Trento.
- 1754 Carlo Alisio Pietragrua, Bamberg.
- 1754 Ignaz Holzbauer, Mannheim.
- 1754 Johann Gottlieb Harrer, Leipzig.
- 1755 Johann Ernst Eberlin in German translation at the Convent of the Benedictines, Salzburg.
- 1756 Giuseppe Feroci, Arezzo.
- 1759 Giovanni Masi, Florence.
- 1759 Francesco Zannetti, Volterra.
- 1762 Domenico Francesco Vannucci (1718–1775), Lucca.
- 1767 Johann Gottlieb Naumann, Padua.
- 1772 Pietro Pompeo Sales (1729–1797), Ehrenbreitstein.
- 1773 Josef Mysliveček, Florence.
- 1775 Pietro Maria Crispi, maestro di capella, Rome.
- 1776 Antonio Salieri, Vienna. – Metastasio is recorded to have said before the emperor that Salieri's setting "was the most expressive of any written on this poem."
- 1776 Francesco Antonio Uttini, Stockholm.
- 1776 Andrea Luchesi, Bonn.
- 1778 Joseph Schuster, Dresden. (Pupil of Johann Georg Schürer above).
- 1778 Giuseppe Morosini patrizio veneto, Venice.
- 1778 Joseph Schuster, Dresden.
- 1778 Joseph Starzer (1726–1787), Vienna.
- 1779 Giammaria Pavani, Ancona.
- 1780 Antonio Calegari (1757–1828), Florence.
- 1780 Gian Francesco de Majo, Bologna.
- 1782 Francesco Azopardi, Manoel Theatre, Valletta.
- 1783 Giovanni Paisiello, Saint Petersburg, also Warsaw, 1784.
- 1783 Johann Friedrich Reichardt, Vienna.
- 1783 Luciano Xavier dos Santos (1734–1808), Lisbon.
- 1785 Carlo Commandini.
- 1786 Alessio Prati, Florence.
- 1787 Federico Torelli, Bologna
- 1787 Nicola Antonio Zingarelli, Milan.
- 1788 Carlo Spontoni, Bologna.
- 1789 Gaetano Andreozzi, Naples.
- 1789 Vincenzo Fiocchi, Rome.
- 1790 Pietro Guglielmi, Madrid.
- 1790 Antonio Teiber, Vienna.
- 1791 Almerici.
- 1792 Stanislao Mattei, Bologna.
- 1794 Johann Simon Mayr, Venice.
- 1794 Michele Mortellari, London.
- 1799 Giuseppe Nicolini, Naples.
- 1812 Francesco Morlacchi, Dresden. (Pupil of Stanislao Mattei above).
- 2023 Flavio Ferri-Benedetti, Basel
