= Georg Nigl =

Austrian opera singer

- Born: 1972 (age 53–54); Vienna
- Education: Wiener Sängerknaben; Musikhochschule Wien; Konservatorium Wien
- Occupation: Operatic baritone
- Organizations: State University of Music and Performing Arts Stuttgart

Georg Nigl (born 1972) is an Austrian baritone in opera and concert, and a professor of voice at the State University of Music and Performing Arts Stuttgart. Performing internationally, he is known for roles in contemporary operas, such as creating the title role in Pascal Dusapin's Faustus, the Last Night at the Berlin State Opera. He names as his favourite roles Monteverdi's Orfeo, Mozart's Papageno and Alban Berg's Wozzeck.

== Career ==
Born in Vienna, Nigl was a soprano soloist with the Wiener Sängerknaben. He studied voice at the Musikhochschule Wien with Margaretha Sparber and Rolf Sartorius, and Lied at the Konservatorium Wien with David Lutz. He completed his studies with Kammersängerin Hilde Zadek.

Nigl created the title role in Pascal Dusapin's opera Faustus, the Last Night at the Berlin State Opera, and participated in premieres of music by Friedrich Cerha, HK Gruber, Georg Friedrich Haas, Wolfgang Mitterer, Olga Neuwirth and Salvatore Sciarrino. He made his debut at the Salzburg Festival in 2006 as Saretzki in Tchaikovsky's Eugen Onegin. He names as his favourite roles Monteverdi's Orfeo, Mozart's Papageno and Alban Berg's Wozzeck.

Nigl appeared as Wozzeck both at La Scala and the Bolshoi Theatre. He performed the title role of Wolfgang Rihm's Jakob Lenz at the Wiener Festwochen, and the role of Lui in the premiere of Dusapin's Passione at the Aix-en-Provence Festival. In 2010, he appeared in the title role of Rihm's Dionysos at the Dutch National Opera in Amsterdam, and in the title role, the Devil, of Die Tragödie des Teufels by Péter Eötvös at the Bavarian State Opera.

In recital, Nigl has collaborated with Alexander Melnikov and Andreas Staier, among others, performing worldwide.

Nigl has been a professor of voice at the State University of Music and Performing Arts Stuttgart.
