= Gladys Kuchta =

American opera singer (1915–1998)

Gladys Kuchta (16 June 1915 – 7 October 1998) was an American operatic soprano who sang leading roles in opera houses worldwide including the Vienna State Opera, Royal Opera House, Bayreuth Festival, San Francisco Opera, and the Teatro Colón.

== Repertoire ==
- Isolde Tristan und Isolde
- Elektra, Chrysothemis Elektra
- Amelia Un Ballo in Maschera
- Brünnhilde Siegfried
- Turandot Turandot
- Leonore Fidelio
- Aida Aida
- Sieglinde, Brünnhilde Die Walküre
- Brünnhilde Götterdämmerung
- Lady Macbeth in Macbeth
- Abigaille Nabucco
- Elsa Lohengrin
- Färberin Die Frau ohne Schatten
- Giulietta Les Contes de Hoffmann
- Senta Der Fliegende Holländer
- Ursula Mathis der Maler
- Elettra Idomeneo
- Marie Wozzeck
