= Riversul =

- Municipality
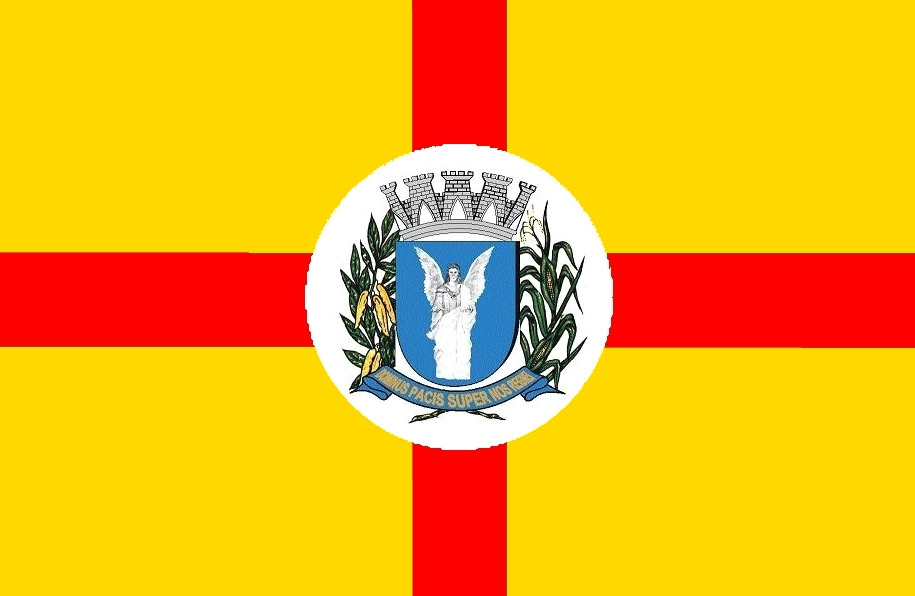
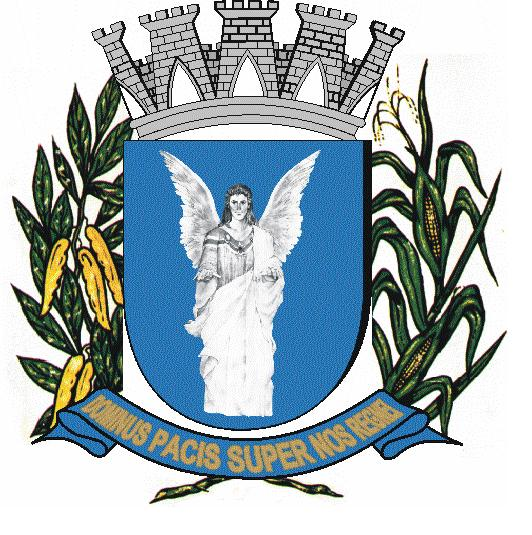
- Flag Coat of arms

- Location in São Paulo state

- Location in Brazil
- Coordinates: 23°49′42″S 49°25′45″W
- Country: Brazil
- Region: Southeast
- State: São Paulo

Area
  - Total: 386 km^{2} (149 sq mi)

Population (2020)
  - Total: 5,443
  - Density: 14.1/km^{2} (36.5/sq mi)
- Time zone: UTC−3 (BRT)

Riversul is a municipality in the state of São Paulo in Brazil. The population is 5,443 (2020 est.) in an area of 386 km^{2}. The elevation is 587m. Its original name was Ribeirão Vermelho do Sul (trans.: "Red Southern Creek"), but due to a homonymous municipality, its name was contracted to this current form in 1980.

== Media ==
In telecommunications, the city was served by Companhia de Telecomunicações do Estado de São Paulo until 1975, when it began to be served by Telecomunicações de São Paulo. In July 1998, this company was acquired by Telefónica, which adopted the Vivo brand in 2012.

The company is currently an operator of cell phones, fixed lines, internet (fiber optics/4G) and television (satellite and cable).

== See also ==
- List of municipalities in São Paulo
