= Helmut Koch =

German mathematician (1932–2024)

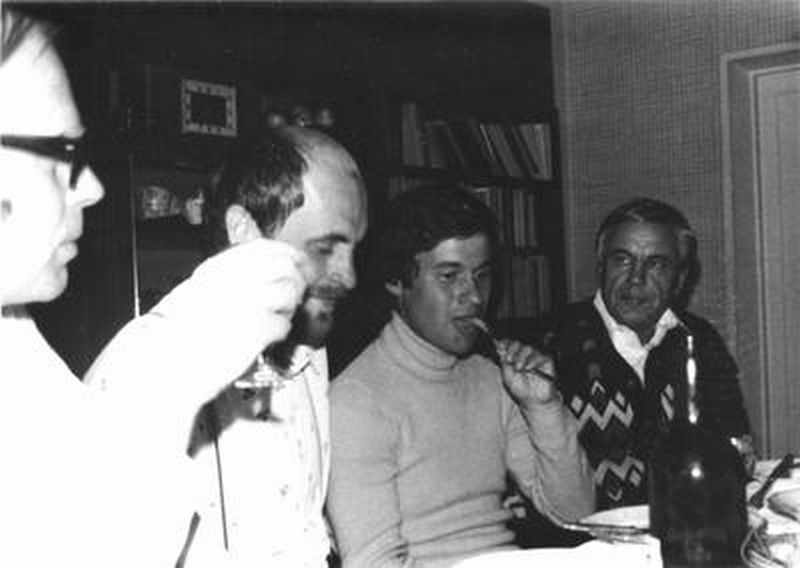
Koch (far left) in the apartment of Shafarevich (right), with Fyodor Bogomolov, A. N. Todorov

Helmut V. Koch (5 October 1932 – 12 November 2024) was a German mathematician who specialised in number theory.

== Life and career ==
Koch was born in Potsdam on 5 October 1932. Koch studied from 1952 to 1957 at the Humboldt-Universität zu Berlin. From 1957 to 1959, he worked in the semiconductor plant at Teltow. From 1959, he was a member of the Institute for Mathematics of the Akademie der Wissenschaften der DDR, where he received in 1964 his promotion (Ph.D.) and in 1965 his habilitation. He studied under Hans Reichardt and Igor Shafarevich (1960–61 in Moscow). The famous "Number Theory" textbook by Shafarevich and Borevich was translated by Koch from Russian into German. Koch was from 1969 to 1991 the head of the research group at the Institute for Mathematics and from 1992 to 1996, the head of a working group at the Humboldt University, where he became a full professor in 1992. He was on research sabbaticals in Moscow, Saint Petersburg, and Novosibirsk and at the University of Paris, University of Montreal, University of Alberta, University of Cambridge, ETH Zürich, the Stefan Banach International Mathematical Center in Warsaw, and the Max-Planck-Institut für Mathematik in Bonn.

Koch's research dealt with, among other topics, the Galois theory of algebraic number fields, p-extensions of number fields, cubic number fields, and class field theory.

He was a member of the Akademie der Wissenschaften der DDR. He was a full member of the Academy of Sciences Leopoldina, the Academia Europaea, and the Berlin-Brandenburgische Akademie der Wissenschaften. He was a corresponding member of the Heidelberger Akademie der Wissenschaften. In 1986 he was an Invited Speaker at the ICM in 1986 in Berkeley, California. In 1993 he became a member of the editorial staff of the Mathematische Nachrichten.

Koch died on 12 November 2024, at the age of 92.

== Selected publications ==
- with Herbert Pieper: Zahlentheorie – ausgewählte Methoden und Ergebnisse. Deutscher Verlag der Wissenschaften, Berlin 1976 (Einführung)
- Zahlentheorie – algebraische Zahlen und Funktionen. Vieweg 1997
- Algebraic Number Theory. 2nd edition, Springer 1997 (in Encyclopedia of mathematical sciences, eds. Parshin, Shafarevich)
- Einführung in die Mathematik – Hintergründe der Schulmathematik. Springer, 2nd edition 2004, ISBN 3540203915
- Einführung in die klassische Mathematik, vol. 1 Vom quadratischen Reziprozitätsgesetz zum Uniformisierungssatz. Springer 1986, English: Introduction to classical mathematics – from the quadratic reciprocity law to the uniformization theorem, Kluwer 1991
- Galois theory of p-extensions. Springer 2002 (older edition: Die Galoissche Theorie der p-Erweiterungen, Deutscher Verlag der Wissenschaften 1970)
- Über Galoissche Gruppen von p-adischen Zahlkörpern, Akademie Verlag 1964

== Sources ==
- Gottwald, Ilgauds, Schlote: Biographien bedeutender Mathematiker, Leipzig 1990
- "Koch, Helmut ("Wer war wer in der DDR?")". Biographische Datenbanken, bundesstiftung-aufarbeitung.de.
