= Christoph Spering =

German conductor

Christoph Spering (23 June 1959 in Simmern) is a German conductor of classical music, especially church music. He founded in 1985 the choir Chorus Musicus Köln and in 1988 the orchestra Das Neue Orchester (The new orchestra).

== Selected recordings ==
- Johann Sebastian Bach: Cantatas
- Gioachino Rossini: Stabat Mater
- Wolfgang Amadeus Mozart: Requiem
- Luigi Cherubini: Les deux journées
- Felix Mendelssohn: Athalia
- Antonio Salieri: La passione di Gesù Cristo
- Antonio Casimir Cartellieri: La celebre Natività del Redentore
- Franz Schubert: Die Verschworenen
- Ludwig van Beethoven: Christus am Ölberge
- Josef Mysliveček: La Passione di Nostro Signore Gesù Cristo
- Jan Kalivoda: Symphonies No. 5 and 7
- Gluck/Wagner: Iphigenie in Aulis
- Jean-François Lesueur: Coronation oratorios
- Robert Schumann: Der Rose Pilgerfahrt
