= Berlin Radio Symphony Orchestra =

German symphony orchestra

- Radio orchestra
- Official logo
- Native name: Rundfunk-Sinfonieorchester Berlin
- Founded: 1923; 103 years ago
- Location: Berlin, Germany
- Concert hall: Konzerthaus Berlin; Berliner Philharmonie
- Principal conductor: Vladimir Jurowski
- Website: www.rsb-online.de

The Berlin Radio Symphony Orchestra (Rundfunk-Sinfonieorchester Berlin) is a German symphony orchestra based in Berlin. In Berlin, the orchestra gives concerts at the Konzerthaus Berlin and at the Berliner Philharmonie. The orchestra has also given concerts in other German cities such as Aschaffenburg, Essen, Halle, Oldenburg, and Wiesbaden. It is the second-oldest radio orchestra with 114 musicians.

== History ==
The orchestra was founded in 1923 as a radio orchestra. Bruno Seidler-Winkler was the first chief conductor, from 1926 to 1932. During its early years, the orchestra had a reputation for its work with contemporary, 20th-century composers. Composers who guest-conducted the orchestra included Paul Hindemith, Arthur Honegger, Darius Milhaud, Sergei Prokofiev, Richard Strauss, Arnold Schoenberg and Igor Stravinsky, as well as Krzysztof Penderecki, Walter Schartner and Udo Zimmermann.

The orchestra gave its first post-war concert in Berlin on May 18, 1945. After the 1949 division of Germany, the orchestra was under the supervision of Rundfunk der DDR (DDR Radio). The orchestra is currently a member of the Radio-Orchester and Choir gGmbH, founded in 1994, an association of four Berlin radio ensembles (RIAS Kammerchor, Berlin Radio Choir, RSB, DSO), which is jointly supported by Deutschlandradio (40%), the Federal Republic of Germany (35%), the State of Berlin (20%), and Rundfunk Berlin-Brandenburg (5%).

In September 2015, the orchestra announced the appointment of Vladimir Jurowski as its chief conductor, effective with the 2017–2018 season. In April 2019, the orchestra announced the extension of Jurowski's contract as chief conductor through the 2022–2023 season.

Also in April 2019, the orchestra announced the appointment of Karina Canellakis as its next principal guest conductor, effective with the 2019–2020 season. The first female conductor to be named principal guest conductor of the orchestra, Canellakis held the post through the 2022–2023 season. In June 2021, the orchestra announced a further extension of Jurowski's contract as chief conductor through 31 August 2027. In September 2025, the orchestra announced a two-year extension of Jurowski's contract through 2029.

From the 1950s to the 1980s, the orchestra made recordings on Eterna Records. More recently, the orchestra has recorded commercially for such labels as Pentatone, including ten operas of Richard Wagner with Janowski conducting, and the Symphony No. 3 of Alfred Schnittke with Jurowski. Other recordings include Max Reger's Piano Concerto for Hyperion, and Rudi Stephan's 1915 opera Die ersten Menschen, for CPO.

== Chief conductors ==
- Bruno Seidler-Winkler (1926–1932)
- Eugen Jochum (1932–1934)
- Sergiu Celibidache (1945–1946)
- Hermann Abendroth (1953–1956)
- Rolf Kleinert (1959–1973)
- Heinz Rögner (1973–1993)
- Rafael Frühbeck de Burgos (1994–2000)
- Marek Janowski (2002–2015)
- Vladimir Jurowski (2017–present)

== Venues ==
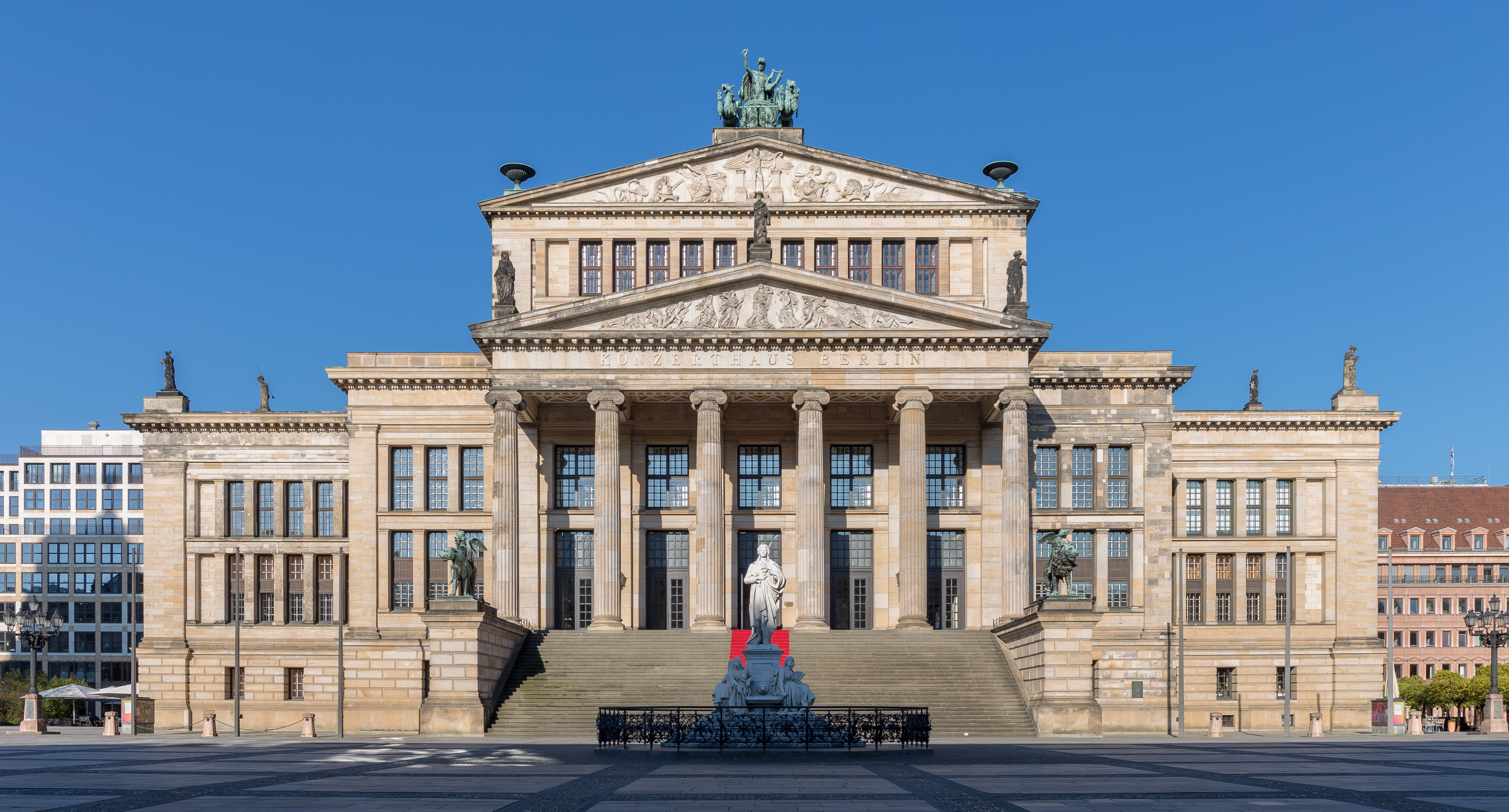
Konzerthaus Berlin

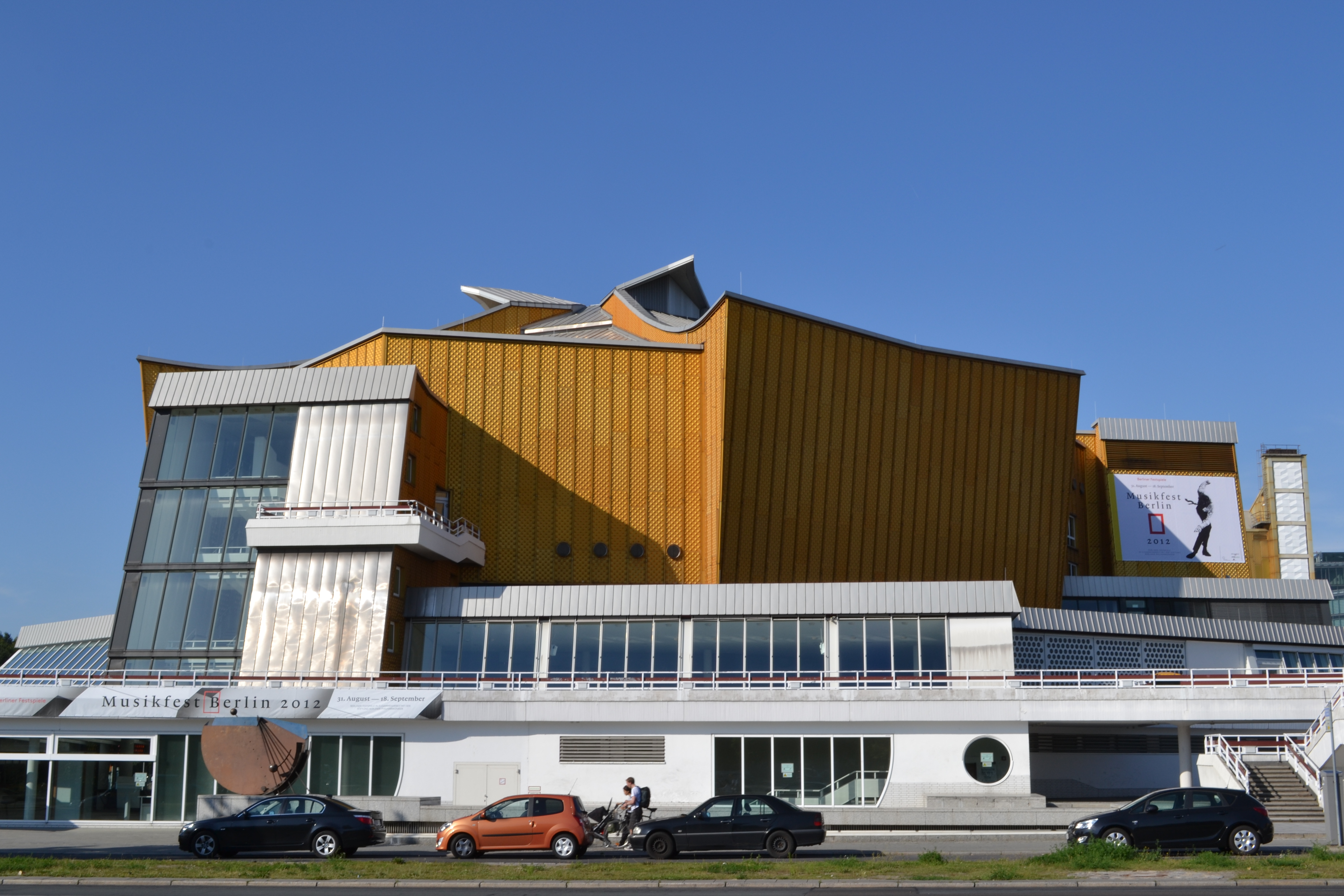
Berliner Philharmonie

== Recordings ==
- Hans Sommer: 'Orchestral Songs'. Mojca Erdmann, Anke Vondung, Mauro Peter and Benjamin Appl, Guillermo García Calvo, Rundfunk-Sinfonieorchester Berlin. PENTATONE PTC 5187023 (2022)
- Witold Lutosławski, Henri Dutilleux: Cello Concertos. Johannes Moser, Thomas Søndergård, Rundfunk-Sinfonieorchester Berlin. PENTATONE PTC 5186689 (2018).
- Béla Bartók & Zoltán Kodály – Concertos for Orchestra. Jakub Hrusa. PENTATONE PTC 5186626 (2018).
- Engelbert Humperdinck – Hänsel und Gretel. Marek Janowski, Ricarda Merbeth, Albert Dohmen, Christian Elsner, Katrin Wundsam, Alexandra Hutton, Annika Gerhards, Alexandra Steiner, Rundfunk-Sinfonieorchester Berlin, Kinderchor Staatsoper Berlin. PENTATONE PTC 5186605 (2017).
- Richard Strauss – Also sprach Zarathustra / Gustav Mahler – Totenfeier. Vladimir Jurowski, Rundfunk-Sinfonieorchester Berlin. PENTATONE PTC 5186597 (2017).
- Ludwig van Beethoven – Missa Solemnis. Marek Janowski, Regine Hangler, Clementine Margaine, Christian Elsner, Franz Josef Selig, Rundfunk-Sinfonieorchester Berlin, MDR Rundfunkchor Leipzig. PENTATONE PTC 5186565 (2017).
- Richard Wagner – Der Ring des Nibelungen. Marek Janowski, Tomasz Konieczny, Christian Elsner, Iris Vermillion, Jochen Schmeckenbecher, Matti Salminen, Petra Lang, Stephen Gould, Robert Dean Smith, Melanie Diener, Lance Ryan Clinker, Kismara Pessatti, Katharina Kammerloher, Julia Borchert, Markus Brück, Marina Prudenskaya, Violeta Urmana, Edith Haller, Fionnuala McCarthy, Anja Fidelia Ulrich, Rundfunk-Sinfonieorchester Berlin, Rundfunkchor Berlin. PENTATONE PTC 5186581 (2016).
- Tchaikovsky – Piano Concerto No. 1 in B-flat minor, Op. 23 / Grieg – Piano Concerto in A minor, Op. 16. Denis Kozhukhin, Vassily Sinaisky, Rundfunk-Sinfonieorchester Berlin. PENTATONE PTC 5186566 (2016).
- Wagner – Overtures, Preludes and Orchestral Excerpts. Marek Janowski, Rundfunk-Sinfonieorchester Berlin. PENTATONE PTC 5186551 (2016).
- Schnittke – 3rd Symphony. Vladimir Jurowski, Rundfunk-Sinfonieorchester Berlin. PENTATONE PTC 5186485 (2015).
- Richard Strauss – Symphonia Domestica & Die Tageszeiten for male chorus and Orchestra. Marek Janowski, Rundfunk-Sinfonieorchester Berlin, Rundfunkchor Berlin. PENTATONE PTC 5186507 (2015).
- Schubert: Lieder, orchestrated by Max Reger & Anton Webern. Christian Elsner, Marek Janowski, Rundfunk-Sinfonieorchester Berlin. PENTATONE PTC 5186394 (2015).
- Piano Concertos by Sergei Prokofiev and Aram Khachaturian. Nareh Arghamanyan, Alain Altinoglu, Rundfunk-Sinfonieorchester Berlin. PENTATONE PTC 5186510 (2014).
- Richard Wagner – Das Rheingold. Marek Janowski, Tomasz Konieczny, Iris Vermillion, Günther Groisböck, Andreas Conrad, Maria Radner, Christian Elsner, Antonio Yang, Kor-Jan Dusseljee, Ricarda Merbeth, Timo Riihonen, Julia Borchert, Katharina Kammerloher, Kismara Pessatti, Jochen Schmeckenbecher, Rundfunk-Sinfonieorchester Berlin. PENTATONE PTC 5186406 (2013).
- Richard Wagner – Götterdämmerung. Marek Janowski, Matti Salminen, Lance Ryan Clinker, Petra Lang, Markus Brück, Edith Haller, Jochen Schmeckenbecher, Marina Prudenskaya, Julia Borchert, Katharina Kammerloher, Kismara Pessatti, Susanne Resmark, Christa Mayer, Jacquelyn Wagner, Rundfunk-Sinfonieorchester Berlin, Rundfunkchor Berlin. PENTATONE PTC 5186409 (2013).
- Richard Wagner – Siegfried. Marek Janowski, Anna Larsson, Tomasz Konieczny, Stephen Gould, Violeta Urmana, Matti Salminen, Jochen Schmeckenbecher, Christian Elsner, Sophie Klussmann, Rundfunk-Sinfonieorchester Berlin. PENTATONE PTC 5186408 (2013).
- Richard Wagner – Die Walküre. Tomasz Konieczny, Iris Vermillion, Robert Dean Smith, Timo Riihonen, Petra Lang, Marek Janowski, Nicole Piccolini, Kismara Pessatti, Anja Fidelia Ulrich, Fionnuala McCarthy, Heike Wessels, Carola Höhn, Wilke te Brummelstroete, Renate Spingler, Melanie Diener, Rundfunk-Sinfonieorchester Berlin. PENTATONE PTC 5186407 (2013).
- Richard Wagner – Tannhäuser. Albert Dohmen, Robert Dean Smith, Christian Gerhaher, Peter Sonn, Wilhelm Schwinghammer, Michael McCown, Martin Snel, Nina Stemme, Marina Prudenskaya, Bianca Reim, Marek Janowski, Rundfunk-Sinfonieorchester Berlin, Rundfunkchor Berlin. PENTATONE PTC 5186405 (2013).
- Leoš Janáček – Mša Glagolskaja (Missa Solemnis) & Taras Bulba. Aga Mikolaj, Iris Vermillion, Stuart Neill, Arutjun Kotchinian, Iveta Apkalna, Marek Janowski, Rundfunk-Sinfonieorchester Berlin. PENTATONE PTC 5186388 (2013).
- Richard Wagner – Tristan und Isolde. Nina Stemme, Kwangchul Youn, Johan Reuter, Michelle Breedt, Clemens Bieber, Arttu Kataja, Timothy Fallon, Marek Janowski, Stephen Gould, Simon Pauly, Rundfunk-Sinfonieorchester Berlin, Rundfunkchor Berlin. PENTATONE PTC 5186404 (2012).
- Richard Wagner – Lohengrin. Günther Groissböck, Klaus Florian Vogt, Annette Dasch, Gerd Grochowski, Susanne Resmark, Markus Brück, Marek Janowski, Rundfunk-Sinfonieorchester Berlin, Rundfunkchor Berlin. PENTATONE PTC 5186403 (2012).
- Richard Wagner – Parsifal. Evgeny Nikitin, Dimitry Ivashchenko, Franz Josef Selig, Eike Wilm Schulte, Michelle DeYoung, Clemens Bieber, Tuomas Pursio, Olivia Vermeulen, Ulrike Schneider, Michael Smallwood, Timothy Fallon, Julia Borchert, Martina Rüping, Lani Poulson, Christian Elsner, Marek Janowski, Sophie Klussmann, Rundfunk-Sinfonieorchester Berlin, Rundfunkchor Berlin. PENTATONE PTC 5186401 (2012).
- Franz Liszt – Piano Concertos, Totentanz, Fantasy on Hungarian Folk Tunes. Nareh Arghamanyan, Alain Altinoglu, Rundfunk-Sinfonieorchester Berlin. PENTATONE PTC 5186397 (2012).
- Richard Wagner – Die Meistersinger von Nürnberg. Albert Dohmen, Georg Zeppenfeld, Michael Smallwood, Sebastian Noack, Dietrich Henschel, Tuomas Pursio, Jörg Schörner, Thomas Ebenstein, Thorsten Scharnke, Tobias Berndt, Hans-Peter Scheidegger, Lee Hyung-Wook, Robert Dean Smith, Peter Sonn, Edith Haller, Michelle Breedt, Matti Salminen, Marek Janowski, Rundfunk-Sinfonieorchester Berlin, Rundfunkchor Berlin. PENTATONE PTC 5186402 (2011).
- Richard Wagner – Der fliegende Holländer. Matti Salminen, Ricarda Merbeth, Robert Dean Smith, Silvia Hablowetz, Steve Davislim, Albert Dohmen, Marek Janowski, Rundfunk-Sinfonieorchester Berlin, Rundfunkchor Berlin. PENTATONE PTC 5186400 (2011).
- Johannes Brahms – Ein deutsches Requiem. Camilla Tilling, Detlef Roth, Marek Janowski, Rundfunk-Sinfonieorchester Berlin. PENTATONE PTC 5186361 (2010).
- Karol Szymanowski & Antonín Dvořák – Violin Concertos. Arabella Steinbacher, Marek Janowski, Rundfunk-Sinfonieorchester Berlin. PENTATONE PTC 5186353 (2009).
- Modest Mussorgsky (Orchestration: Maurice Ravel) – Pictures at an Exhibition, Gilbert Levine, Berlin Radio Symphony Orchestra. Capriccio C7 1047 (2005)
