= Marek Janowski =

Polish-born German conductor (born 1939)

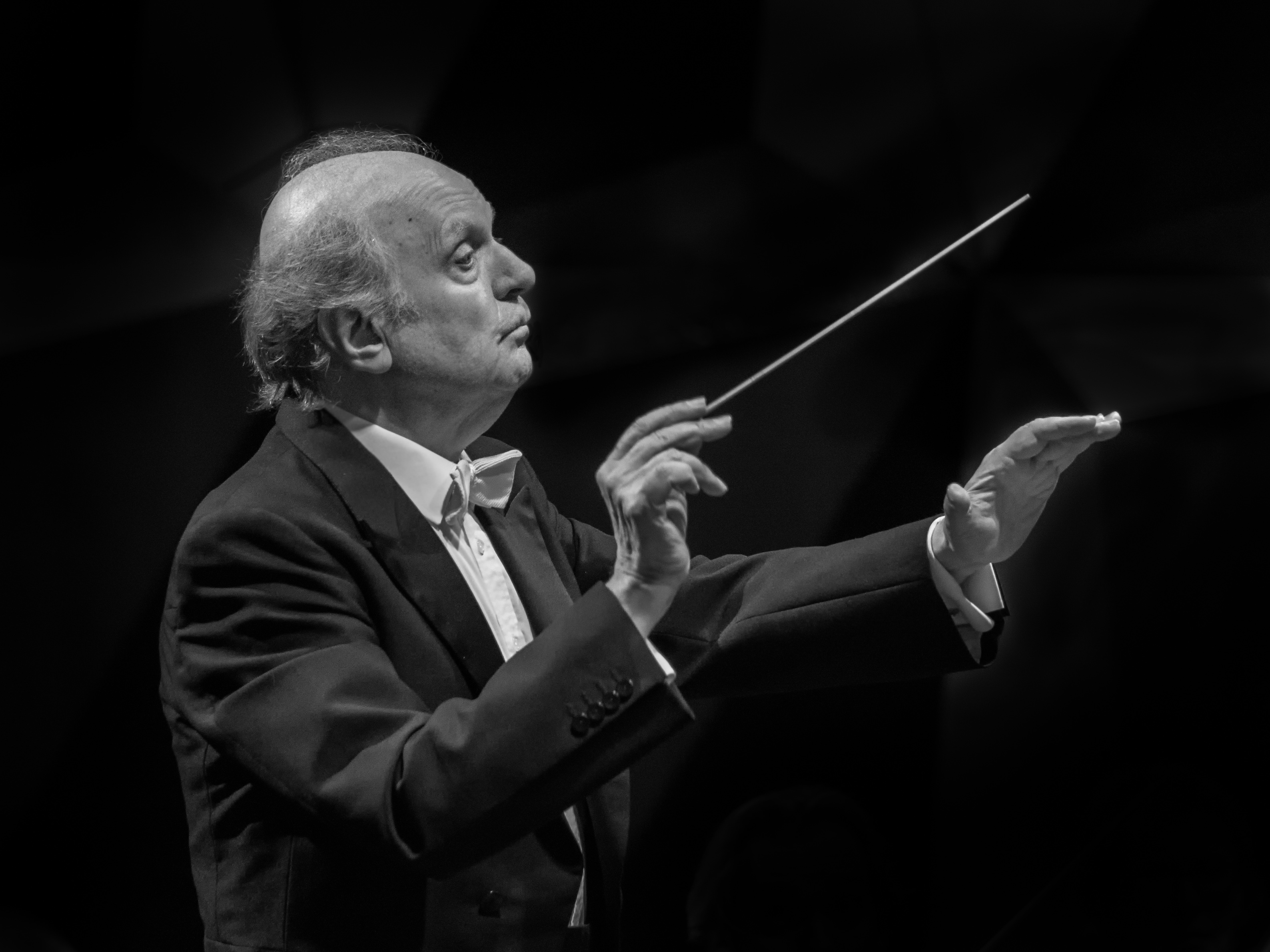
Marek Janowski (2016)

Marek Janowski (born 18 February 1939 in Warsaw) is a Polish-born German conductor.

== Biography ==
Janowski grew up in Wuppertal, near Cologne, after his mother traveled there at the start of World War II to be with her parents. His father disappeared in Poland during the war.

Janowski served as music director in Freiburg and at the Dortmund Opera conducting the Dortmunder Philharmoniker, the latter from 1973 to 1979. From 1983 to 1987 he was principal conductor of the Royal Liverpool Philharmonic Orchestra. He served as Kapellmeister of the Gürzenich Orchestra in Cologne from 1986 to 1990. He developed an important profile in France as well, becoming music director of the Orchestre Philharmonique de Radio France (then called the Nouvel Orchestre Philharmonique) in Paris in 1984 and retaining that post until 2000. He then was principal conductor of the Monte-Carlo Philharmonic Orchestra from 2000 to 2009.

Janowski was chief conductor of the Dresden Philharmonic from 2001 to 2003. From 2002 through 2016, Janowski was chief conductor of the Berlin Radio Symphony Orchestra, initially with a contract for life with the orchestra at the time. In the 2005/06 season, Janowski began his tenure as Artistic and Music Director of the Orchestre de la Suisse Romande (OSR), with an initial contract of five years. In September 2008, his contract with the OSR was extended to 2015. However, in January 2010, in a change to the September 2008 contract extension, Janowski and the OSR mutually agreed on the scheduled conclusion of his directorship of the OSR after the 2011–2012 season.

In the USA, beginning in 2005, Janowski served as one of the conductors in a "triumvirate" of conductor leadership with the Pittsburgh Symphony Orchestra (PSO), with Sir Andrew Davis and Yan Pascal Tortelier, providing artistic guidance for the orchestra in the absence of a single music director. This arrangement ended in 2008 after the accession of Manfred Honeck as the PSO's music director. Janowski subsequently held the Otto Klemperer Guest Conductor Chair with the PSO. He has recorded the four symphonies of Johannes Brahms with the PSO.

In September 2018, the Dresden Philharmonic announced the re-appointment of Janowski as its chief conductor, effective with the 2019–2020 season, with an initial contract of 3 seasons. In November 2020, the orchestra announced the extension of Janowski's contract as chief conductor by one season, through the summer of 2023, when he concluded his second tenure with the Dresden Philharmonic

== Discography ==
Janowski has made a number of operatic recordings, including the first digital recording of the complete Ring Cycle of Richard Wagner between 1980 and 1983 for RCA, with the Staatskapelle Dresden. He and that orchestra had earlier made the first recordings of Die schweigsame Frau by Richard Strauss, in 1976 for EMI, and of Euryanthe by Carl Maria von Weber, in 1974 for EMI, with Jessye Norman and Nicolai Gedda singing the lead roles. Another operatic first recording was of Krzysztof Penderecki's The Devils of Loudun with the Hamburg State Opera, shortly after he led the world premiere of the work in 1969. He also made the first Super Audio CD surround-sound recordings of several Wagner operas, including the Ring Cycle, all with the Rundfunk-Sinfonieorchester Berlin on the Pentatone label.

- Puccini – Il tabarro. Melody Moore, Lester Lynch, Brian Jagde, Marek Janowski, Dresdner Philharmonie, MDR Rundfunkchor Leipzig. PENTATONE PTC 5186773 (2020)
- Mascagni – Cavalleria rusticana. Melody Moore, Lester Lynch, Marek Janowski, Brian Jagde, Dresdner Philharmonie, MDR Rundfunkchor Leipzig. PENTATONE PTC 5186772 (2020)
- Beethoven – Symphonies 5 & 6. Marek Janowski, WDR Symphony Orchestra Cologne. PENTATONE PTC 5186809 (2019)
- Weber – Der Freischütz. Marek Janowski, Andreas Schager, Lise Davidsen, Alan Held, Sofia Fomina, Markus Eiche, Christoph Filler, Andreas Bauer Kanabas, Franz Josef Selig, Corinna Kirchhoff, Peter Simonischek, Frankfurt Radio Symphony, MDR Rundfunkchor Leipzig. PENTATONE PTC 5186788 (2019)
- Hindemith – Orchestral Works. WDR Symphony Orchestra Cologne. PENTATONE PTC 5186672 (2018).
- Humperdinck – Hänsel und Gretel. Ricarda Merbeth, Albert Dohmen, Christian Elsner, Katrin Wundsam, Alexandra Hutton, Annika Gerhards, Alexandra Steiner, Rundfunk-Sinfonieorchester Berlin, Kinderchor Staatsoper Berlin. PENTATONE PTC 5186605 (2017).
- Beethoven – Missa Solemnis'. Regine Hangler, Clementine Margaine, Christian Elsner, Franz Josef Selig, Rundfunk-Sinfonieorchester Berlin, MDR Rundfunkchor. PENTATONE PTC 5186565 (2017).
- Wagner – Der Ring des Nibelungen (complete). Marek Janowski, Tomasz Konieczny, Christian Elsner, Iris Vermillion, Jochen Schmeckenbecher, Matti Salminen, Petra Lang, Stephen Gould, Robert Dean Smith, Melanie Diener, Lance Ryan Clinker, Kismara Pessatti, Katharina Kammerloher, Julia Borchert, Markus Brück, Marina Prudenskaya, Violeta Urmana, Edith Haller, Fionnuala McCarthy, Anja Fidelia Ulrich, Rundfunk-Sinfonieorchester Berlin, Rundfunkchor Berlin. PENTATONE PTC 5186581 (2016)
- Richard Wagner – Overtures, Preludes and Orchestral Excerpts. Marek Janowski, Rundfunk-Sinfonieorchester Berlin. PENTATONE PTC 5186551(2016).
- Franz Schubert Lieder, orchestrated by Max Reger & Anton Webern. Christian Elsner, Marek Janowski, Rundfunk-Sinfonieorchester Berlin. PENTATONE PTC 5186394 (2015).
- Bruckner – The Symphonies. Marek Janowski, Orchestre de la Suisse Romande, Rundfunkchor Berlin. PENTATONE PTC 5186520 (2015).
- Richard Strauss – Symphonia Domestica & Die Tageszeiten for male chorus and Orchestra. Marek Janowski, Rundfunk-Sinfonieorchester Berlin, Rundfunkchor Berlin. PENTATONE PTC 5186507 (2015).
- Richard Wagner – The Operas. Marek Janowski, Matti Salminen, Ricarda Merbeth, Robert Dean Smith, Silvia Hablowetz, Steve Davislim, Albert Dohmen, Evgeny Nikitin, Dimitry Ivashchenko, Franz-Josef Selig, Christian Elsner, Eike Wilm Schulte, Michelle DeYoung, Clemens Bieber, Tuomas Pursio, Olivia Vermeulen, Ulrike Schneider, Michael Smallwood, Timothy Fallon, Julia Borchert, Rundfunk-Sinfonieorchester Berlin, Rundfunkchor Berlin. PENTATONE PTC 5186700 (2014).
- Leoš Janácek – Mša Glagolskaja & Taras Bulba. Aga Mikolaj, Iris Vermillion, Stuart Neill, Arutjun Kotchinian, Iveta Apkalna, Marek Janowski, Rundfunk-Sinfonieorchester Berlin. PENTATONE PTC 5186388 (2013).
- Bruckner – Messe F-Moll. Lenneke Ruiten, Iris Vermillion, Shawn Mathey, Franz-Josef Selig, Stefan Parkman, Marek Janowski, Orchestre de la Suisse Romande, Rundfunkchor Berlin. PENTATONE PTC 5186501 (2013).
- Bruckner – Symphony No. 2. Marek Janowski, Orchestre de la Suisse Romande. PENTATONE PTC 5186448 (2013).
- Bruckner – Symphony No. 4 "Romantic". Marek Janowski, Orchestre de la Suisse Romande. PENTATONE PTC 5186450. (2013).
- Wagner – Tannhäuser. Albert Dohmen, Robert Dean Smith, Christian Gerhaher, Peter Sonn, Wilhelm Schwinghammer, Michael McCown, Martin Snel, Nina Stemme, Marina Prudenskaya, Bianca Reim, Marek Janowski, Rundfunk-Sinfonieorchester Berlin, Rundfunkchor Berlin. PENTATONE PTC 5186405 (2013).
- Wagner – Götterdämmerung. Marek Janowski, Matti Salminen, Lance Ryan Clinker, Petra Lang, Markus Brück, Edith Haller, Jochen Schmeckenbecher, Marina Prudenskaya, Julia Borchert, Katharina Kammerloher, Kismara Pessatti, Susanne Resmark, Christa Mayer, Jacquelyn Wagner, Rundfunk-Sinfonieorchester Berlin, Rundfunkchor Berlin. PENTATONE PTC 5186409 (2013).
- Wagner – Siegfried. Marek Janowski, Anna Larsson, Tomasz Konieczny, Stephen Gould, Violeta Urmana, Matti Salminen, Jochen Schmeckenbecher, Christian Elsner, Sophie Klussmann, Rundfunk-Sinfonieorchester Berlin. PENTATONE PTC 5186408 (2013).
- Wagner – Die Walküre. Tomasz Konieczny, Iris Vermillion, Robert Dean Smith, Timo Riihonen, Petra Lang, Marek Janowski, Nicole Piccolini, Kismara Pessatti, Anja Fidelia Ulrich, Fionnuala McCarthy, Heike Wessels, Carola Höhn, Wilke Brummelstroete, Renate Spingler, Melanie Diener, Rundfunk-Sinfonieorchester Berlin. PENTATONE PTC 5186407 (2013).
- Wagner – Das Rheingold. Marek Janowski, Tomasz Konieczny, Iris Vermillion, Günther Groisböck, Andreas Conrad, Maria Radner, Christian Elsner, Antonio Yang, Kor-Jan Dusseljee, Ricarda Merbeth, Timo Riihonen, Julia Borchert, Katharina Kammerloher, Kismara Pessatti, Jochen Schmeckenbecher, Rundfunk-Sinfonieorchester Berlin. PENTATONE PTC 5186406 (2013).
- Wagner – Parsifal. Evgeny Nikitin, Dimitry Ivashchenko, Franz Josef Selig, Eike Wilm Schulte, Michelle DeYoung, Clemens Bieber, Tuomas Pursio, Olivia Vermeulen, Ulrike Schneider, Michael Smallwood, Timothy Fallon, Julia Borchert, Martina Rüping, Lani Poulson, Christian Elsner, Marek Janowski, Sophie Klussmann, Rundfunk-Sinfonieorchester Berlin, Rundfunkchor Berlin. PENTATONE PTC 5186401 (2012).
- Richard Wagner – Die Meistersinger von Nürnberg. Albert Dohmen, Georg Zeppenfeld, Michael Smallwood, Sebastian Noack, Dietrich Henschel, Tuomas Pursio, Jörg Schörner, Thomas Ebenstein, Thorsten Scharnke, Tobias Berndt, Hans-Peter Scheidegger, Lee Hyung-Wook, Robert Dean Smith, Peter Sonn, Edith Haller, Michelle Breedt, Matti Salminen, Marek Janowski, Rundfunk-Sinfonieorchester Berlin, Rundfunkchor Berlin. PENTATONE PTC 5186402 (2011).
- Wagner – Lohengrin. Günther Groisböck, Klaus Florian Vogt, Annette Dasch, Gerd Grochowski, Susanne Resmark, Markus Brück, Marek Janowski, Rundfunk-Sinfonieorchester Berlin, Rundfunkchor Berlin. PENTATONE PTC 5186403 (2012).
- Wagner – Tristan und Isolde. Nina Stemme, Youn Kwangchul, Johan Reuter, Michelle Breedt, Clemens Bieber, Arttu Kataja, Timothy Fallon, Marek Janowski, Stephen Gould, Simon Pauly, Rundfunk-Sinfonieorchester Berlin, Rundfunkchor Berlin. PENTATONE PTC 5186404 (2012).
- Bruckner – Symphony No. 1. Marek Janowski, Orchestre de la Suisse Romande. PENTATONE PTC 5186447 (2012).
- Bruckner – Symphony No. 3. Marek Janowski, Orchestre de la Suisse Romande. PENTATONE PTC 5186449 (2012).
- Wagner – Der fliegende Holländer. Matti Salminen, Ricarda Merbeth, Robert Dean Smith, Silvia Hablowetz, Steve Davislim, Albert Dohmen, Marek Janowski, Rundfunk-Sinfonieorchester Berlin, Rundfunkchor Berlin. PENTATONE PTC 5186400 (2011).
- Vincent d'Indy – Camille Saint-Saëns – Ernest Chausson. Orchestral Works. Martin Helmchen, Marek Janowski, Orchestre de la Suisse Romande. PENTATONE PTC 5186357 (2011).
- Béla Bartók – The 2 Violin Concertos. Arabella Steinbacher, Marek Janowski, Orchestre de la Suisse Romande. PENTATONE PTC 5186350 (2010).
- Berlioz – Symphonie Fantastique & King Lear. Marek Janowski, Pittsburgh Symphony Orchestra. PENTATONE PTC 5186338 (2010).
- Bruckner Symphony No. 7 in E major. Marek Janowski, Orchestre de la Suisse Romande. PENTATONE PTC 5186370 (2010).
- Bruckner Symphony No. 8 in C minor. Marek Janowski, Orchestre de la Suisse Romande. PENTATONE PTC 5186371 (2010).
- Bruckner – Symphony No. 5. Marek Janowski, Orchestre de la Suisse Romande. PENTATONE PTC 5186351 (2010).
- Brahms – Ein deutsches Requiem. Camilla Tilling, Detlef Roth, Marek Janowski, Rundfunk-Sinfonieorchester Berlin. PENTATONE PTC 5186361 (2010).
- Richard Strauss – Alpine Symphony & Macbeth. Marek Janowski, Pittsburgh Symphony Orchestra PENTATONE PTC 5186339 (2009).
- Szymanowski & Dvořák – Violin Concertos. Arabella Steinbacher, Marek Janowski, Rundfunk-Sinfonieorchester Berlin, Radio Symphony Orchestra Berlin. PENTATONE PTC 5186353 (2009).
- Bruckner – Symphony No. 6. Marek Janowski, Orchestre de la Suisse Romande. PENTATONE PTC 5186354 (2009).
- Bruckner – Symphony No. 9 in D minor. Marek Janowski, Orchestre de la Suisse Romande. PENTATONE PTC 5186030 (2008).
- Brahms – Symphony No. 4 & Hungarian Dances. Marek Janowski, Pittsburgh Symphony Orchestra. PENTATONE PTC 5186309 (2008).
- Brahms – Symphonies Nos. 2 & 3 Marek Janowski, Pittsburgh Symphony Orchestra. PENTATONE PTC 5186308 (2008).
- Brahms – Symphony No. 1 & Variations on a Theme of Haydn. Marek Janowski, Pittsburgh Symphony Orchestra. PENTATONE PTC 5186307 (2007).
- César Franck & Ernest Chausson – Symphonies. Marek Janowski, Orchestre de la Suisse Romande. PENTATONE PTC 5186078 (2006).

Cultural offices
| Preceded by Gilbert Amy | Music Director, Orchestre Philharmonique de Radio France; 1984–2000 | Succeeded by Myung-whun Chung |
| Preceded by Yuri Ahronovitch | Kapellmeister, Gürzenich Orchestra Cologne; 1986–1990 | Succeeded by James Conlon |
