= Kismara Pezzati =

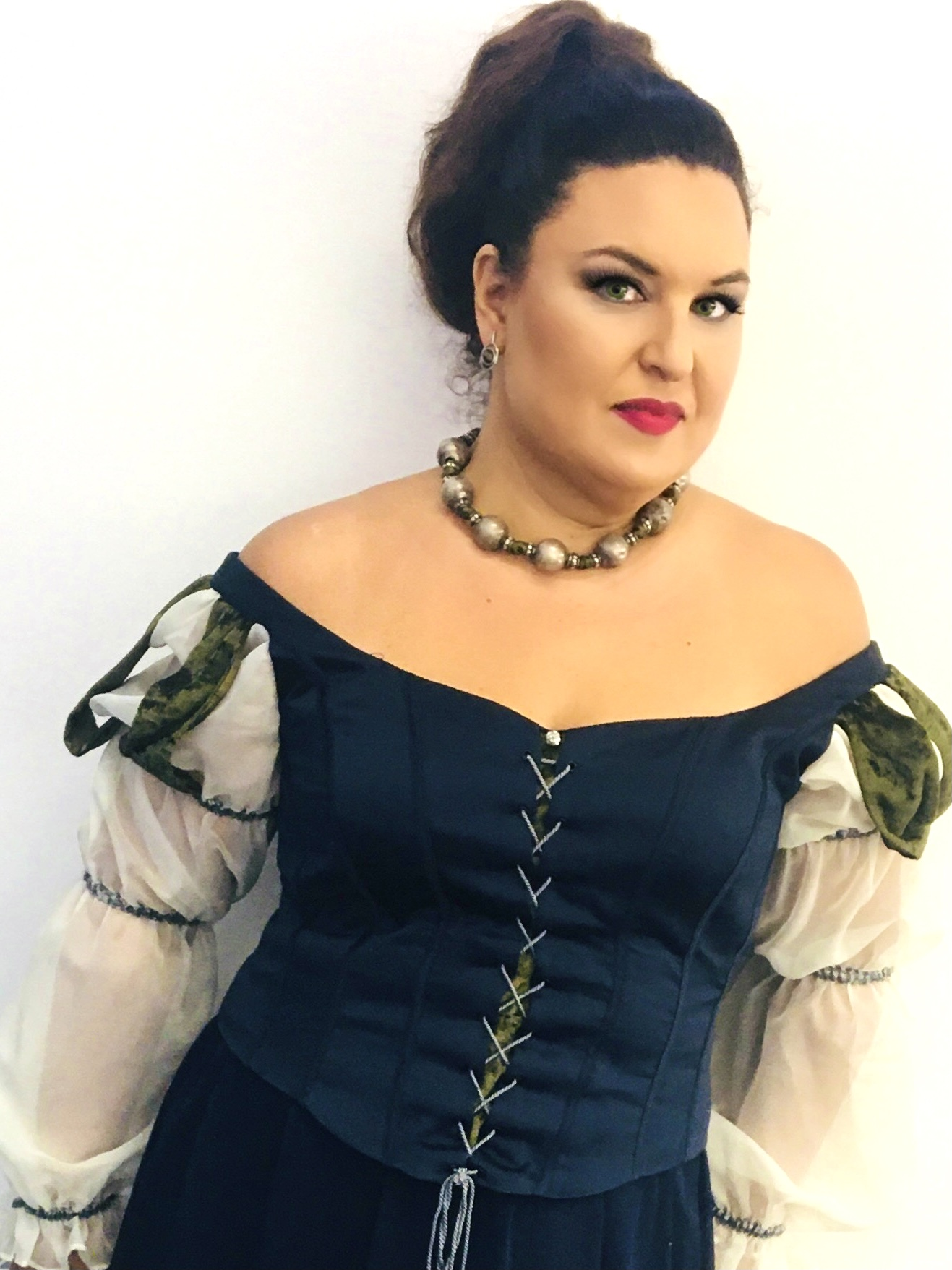
- Kismara Pezzati as Laura in La Gioconda, 2020
- Born: Kismara de Lourdes Pessatti; June 3, 1974 (age 52); Curitiba, Paraná, Brazil
- Occupations: Opera singer, concert soloist
- Website: kismarapezzati.com

Kismara de Lourdes Pessatti, known as Kismara Pezzati and Kismara Pessatti (born June 3, 1974), is a Brazilian mezzo-soprano naturalized in Switzerland. Previously known for performances in operas and concerts primarily as a contralto, she has recently expanded her repertoire to dramatic mezzo-soprano.

She has performed with several internationally-recognized opera companies and orchestras in countries such as Germany, Brazil, Colombia, Spain, France, England, Italy, Japan, Luxembourg, Czech Republic, Russia, Switzerland, Uruguay and Venezuela. Her career includes a number of recordings and performances from a diverse collection of works, from Monteverdi through Wagner and Verdi to contemporary music.

== Early life and education ==
Kismara Pessatti was born in Curitiba, Paraná, in 1974. Pessatti is her official surname, but she started using Pezzati as her stage name after learning that this was the original spelling of her ancestors' surname in Italy, before they emigrated to Brazil.

Her connection to music began in childhood and she grew up singing with her parents and siblings. However, she was the first in the family to dedicate herself to a career in music.

Pessatti holds a BA in Classical Singing from the Escola Superior de Música e Belas Artes do Paraná (Paraná's College of Music and Fine Arts), where she graduated in 1997 under the guidance of prof. Neyde Thomas. Still during her studies, she performed her first solo recitals in the series "Música nos Museus" (Music at the Museums) in Curitiba from 1996 to 1998.

In 1999, she moved to Berlin where she continued her specialization in the class of Prof. Norma Sharp and in the vocal interpretation class of Ks. Júlia Várady. In 2004, she received the title Diplom-Sängerin für Musiktheater und/oder Konzert (which after the Bologna declaration is recognized as a Master's degree) at the Hochschule für Musik Hanns Eisler Berlin (Hanns Eisler Academy of Music Berlin). Other masterclasses with recognized professionals in the field followed, including sessions with Thomas Hampson, Reri Grist and Jeanette Scovotti, Ruth Rohner, Francisco Araiza, and Alberto Zedda, among others.

Early in the course of her studies in Berlin, she debuted in the summer of 2001 as Matilda in the opera Ottone by Handel/Telemann at the Theater Magdeburg, in Germany, thus launching her international career.

== Career (selection) ==
=== 2003 – 2008 ===
Between 2003 and 2005, Pessatti was a member of the Opera Studio at the Zürich Opera (Oper Zürich), where the opera La Pietra del Paragone by Rossini was produced in 2004, with premieres in Zurich and performances in Mezières and Genoa. In this production, she played Clarice, a role that earned her a contract as a regular soloist for the entity. While at the Opera Studio, she performed the role of Mother in the German version of Gian Carlo Menotti's opera "The Consul". She also participated in other professional productions at the house – such as roles as Giovanna in Rigoletto by Verdi (a production recorded on DVD), under Nello Santi and scenic direction by Gilbert Deflo; and as Alisa in Donizetti's Lucia di Lammermoor, conducted by Ralf Weikert and scenic direction by Robert Carsen.

In 2005, in the beginning of her contract with the Zürich Opera, she was chosen by Nikolaus Harnoncourt to participate in Monteverdi's L'incoronazione di Poppea as Nutrice, under his musical direction and scenic direction by Jürgen Flimm. This production was also taken in concert form to the Royal Festival Hall in London. During the same year, she debuted as Filipjewna in Tchaikovski's Eugen Onegin, under Vladimir Fedoseyev and stage direction by Grisha Asagaroff.

For the 2006 season, she debuted as Rosalia in Tiefland by Eugen d'Albert (production released on DVD), under the musical direction of Franz Welser-Möst and stage direction by Matthias Hartmann. In addition, she was featured in a production of Les noces, by Strawinsky, conducted by Peter Feranec and choreographed by Heinz Spoerli.

In 2007, she played Annina in Strauss' Der Rosenkavalier, under Welser-Möst and stage direction by Sven-Eric Bechtolf – a production that was taken to the Bunkamura Orchard Hall in Tokyo. She played Marthe Schwertlein in Faust by Gounod, under the direction of Patrick Fournillier and Götz Friedrich. She was also in Schumann's Szenen aus Goethes Faust, presented in concert form at Zurich's Tonhalle, where she sang the roles of Mater Gloriosa, Martha, Mangel and Samaritana

In 2008, she debuted as Amme in Mussorgsky's Boris Godunov under the direction of Vladimir Fedoseyev and scenic direction by Klaus Grüber. In addition, she played Annina once more in Der Rosenkavalier under the direction of Welser-Möst, this time in concert form at the Royal Festival Hall in London.

In that same year, the singer left her permanent position with the Zürich Opera.

=== 2009 – 2018 ===
For the 2009 season, Pessatti performed the title role of Bizet's Carmen with the Bergische Symphoniker in concerts in Germany under the direction of Witolf Werner. In Brazil, she debuted at the XIII Festival Amazonas de Ópera (13th Amazonas Opera Festival), in Manaus, as Anna in Les Troyens by Berlioz and as Geneviève in the concert version of Debussy's Pelléas et Mélisande. Back in Germany, she was a soloist of Frank Martin's In Terra Pax in Hagen, under the musical direction of Florian Ludwig.

In 2010, she debuted as Maddalena in Verdi's Rigoletto at the Opéra de Saint-Étienne conducted by Laurent Campellone and stage direction by Guy Joosten, and as Erda in Wagner's Der Ring des Nibelungen (The Ring of the Nibelung) at the Essen Opera under the direction of Stefan Soltesz and Anselm Weber. She was also featured in Mahler's Symphony No. 2 in Bogotá under Lior Shambadal, in Mahler's Symphony No. 8 (Mater Aegyptiaca) in Bielefeld under Peter Kuhn and in Duisburg under Lorin Maazel. In Brazil, she performed Beethoven's Irish Songs with the Piano Trio Porto Alegre for concerts in Curitiba and Porto Alegre.

In the same year, under the direction of Helmuth Rilling, she was featured in Handel's Messiah at the Philharmonie Essen (Germany), in Bach's St John Passion at the Moscow International House of Music, in Bach's Mass in B minor in Caracas, and in the production of Honegger's Jeanne d'Arc au bûcher both in Caracas with the Simon Bolivar Youth Orchestra and in Stuttgart with the SWR Symphonieorchester. At the Konzerthaus Berlin, she was one of the furies in Krenek's opera Orpheus und Eurydike under Lothar Zagrosek. Also, under the baton of Facundo Agudin and with the Orchestre Symphonique du Jura, she was the mezzo-soprano soloist in the Requiem by composer Christian Favre, a world premiere that was recorded and released on CD.

During 2011, she dedicated herself mostly to working with conductor Helmuth Rilling. Thus, she was Catherine in the live recording for CD of Jeanne d' Arc au bûcher, held at the Liederhalle concert hall in Stuttgart. In addition, she debuted at the Festspielhaus Baden-Baden (Germany) in celebration of the Herbert von Karajan Music Prize received by Helmuth Rilling, who conducted the singer in both the cantata Wachet! Betet! Betet! Wachet! BWV 70, by Bach, and in Mozart's Requiem with the Bach-Collegium Stuttgart and Gächinger Kantorei. In the same year, she returned to the stage with Rilling and his ensemble, this time for Bach's Christmas Oratoriom at the Liederhalle. In addition to the projects with Rilling, she also sang Mater Samaritana in Bogotá in Mahler's Symphony No. 8, conducted by Enrique Diemecke with the Bogotá Philharmonic Orchestra, and under the musical direction of Facundo Agudin, was the mezzo-soprano featured in Verdi's Requiem in Neuchâtel.

In 2012, she debuted in São Paulo as the protagonist Orfeo in Gluck's Orfeo ed Euridice under the stage direction of Antônio Araújo and musical direction by Nicolau de Figueiredo, in addition to participating in Pelléas et Mélisande by Debussy under the stage direction of Iacov Hillel and musical direction by Abel Rocha, both productions at the Theatro Municipal de São Paulo. In the same year, she debuted at the Amsterdam Concertgebouw in de Falla's El amor brujo, returning to this concert hall for the live recording for CD and TV of the Hartmann's Symphony No. 1 ("Versuch eines Requiem") under the baton of Markus Stenz. In Milan, she sang in Mendelssohn's Elias oratorio with the Orchestra Sinfonica di Milano Giuseppe Verdi under Helmuth Rilling.

For the 2013 season, Pessati recorded live at the Berliner Philharmonie, with the Berlin Radio Symphony Orchestra and under the baton of Marek Janowski, the following works for the series "Wagnerzyklus" by Pentatone: Das Rheingold, Die Walküre and Götterdämmerung (parts of the tetralogy Der Ring des Nibelungen) by Richard Wagner. In addition, she debuted as Mary in Der fliegende Holländer in Geneva under the musical direction of Kirill Karabits at the Wagner Geneva Festival, performed in front of L'Orchestre de Chambre de Genève with the Wesendonck Lieder also by Wagner and edited by Henze under the guidance of Thomas Rösner, as well as in Rossini's work Stabat Mater at the Schleswig-Holstein Musik Festival in Hamburg, Germany. At the Zürich Opera House, she was featured in Wie ich Welt wurde, a production about the life of composer Richard Wagner, with scenic direction by Hans Neuenfels. In Brazil, she debuted in the role of Neris for a production of Médée by Cherubini, in concert form, with the Brazilian Symphony Orchestra at the Theatro Municipal do Rio de Janeiro.

In 2014, the singer debuted in Barcelona at the Gran Teatre del Liceu as Schwertleite in Die Walküre. Other performance highlights for that year included a concert in Prague of the Missa solemnis by Beethoven conducted by Helmuth Rilling, which was broadcast live on Czech TV; as well as her return to Bogotá to be the soloist in Luciano Berio's Folk Songs with the Bogotá Philharmonic Orchestra. She also performed at the Badisches Staatstheater Karlsruhe as Amme in Mussorgsky's Boris Godunov.

In 2015, she returned to the Liederhalle Stuttgart for El Amor Brujo with the Stuttgarter Kammerorchester and conducted by Matthias Foremny. In the same year, the singer was featured in a tour with Les Siècles Orchester under the musical direction of François-Xavier Roth, its founder, with the opera Der Fliegende Holländer by Wagner, premiering at the Théâtre de Caen, in France, and at the Grand Théâtre de Luxembourg. At St. Gallen Opera, she was Juliette in Berlioz's Roméo et Juliette, Filipjewna in Eugen Onegin under the musical direction of Otto Tausk and stage direction by Lydia Steier, and Maffio Orsini in Lucrezia Borgia by Donizetti under the baton of Pietro Rizzo and scenic direction by Tobias Kratzer.

In 2016, Pessatti began a collaboration with the Cologne Opera, where she was featured in Rihm's Die Eroberung von Mexico under the musical direction of Alejo Pérez and stage direction by Peter Konwitschny, a co-production with the Salzburger Festspiele. In the same year, she returned to the Zürich Opera for the role of Mary in Wagner's Der Fliegende Holländer. In Brazil, she debuted with OSESP (São Paulo State Symphony Orchestra) the world premiere of Cecilia by composer Maury Buchala, conducted by Valentina Peleggi, a production that was released on CD and is part of the Encomendas OSESP collection. She also debuted in Rotterdam with the Rotterdam Philharmonic Orchestra in Hartmann's Eerste symfonie (Versuch eines Requiem).

In 2017, she was featured in the production of the world premiere of Xavier Dayer's chamber opera Der Traum von Dir (trailer) at the Zürich Opera. In Colombia, the singer debuted as Ms Quickly in Verdi's Falstaff at the Teatro Mayor de Bogotá, in a co-production with the Ópera de Colombia, under the musical direction of Rodolfo Fischer and stage direction by Alejandro Chacón. In Brazil, she performed the concert "Feminino Céu e Terra" (Female Heaven and Earth) for the Solo Música Series in Brasília and Curitiba. This concert was planned, researched, directed and interpreted by the singer, and was presented as an a capella program for solo voice in two parts: the first with texts and music by Hildegard von Bingen, the second with texts by Kismara Pessatti and Brazilian work songs, where the singer plays percussion as accompaniment. This project was the basis for the CD "Hildegard Now & Then", released in 2019.

For the 2018 season in Europe, she was part of the cast of Wagner's opera Parsifal with the Berlin Philharmonic Orchestra, under the musical direction of Sir Simon Rattle and stage direction by Dieter Dorn at the Festspielhaus Baden-Baden. This production was also taken in concert form to the Berliner Philharmonie. In Latin America, she was Oberon in Benjamin Britten's A Midsummer Night's Dream at Theatro São Pedro in São Paulo, Brazil. This production, which won the Prêmio Concerto for best opera in 2018, had musical direction by Claudio Cruz and stage direction by Jorge Takla. In addition, she debuted at Teatro Solís in Montevideo, with the works Rückert-Lieder by Mahler and Faust et Helene by Lili Boulanger, both with the Orquestra Filarmônica de Montevideo under the baton of Ligia Amadio.

=== 2019–present ===
In 2019, she recorded her first Solo CD, Hildegard Now & Then, produced by the London label Drama Musica and distributed by Naxos. The recording, which received 4 stars in a BBC Music Magazine review, was a project planned, researched and interpreted by Kismara Pessatti herself. In it, the singer performs Hildegard von Bingen's songs in the first part, and in the second part, she commissioned from composer Silvia Berg a song cycle based on selected texts by Hildegard von Bingen, mostly from her letters. These texts were translated into 7 languages (Latin, Portuguese, Italian, German, French, English and Spanish) and recorded with the accompaniment of percussionist Sarah Hatch.

In early 2020, after the singer started using Kismara Pezzati as her artistic name, she returned to São Paulo as the mezzo-soprano soloist in Missa Solemnis, for the celebration of Beethoven's 250th anniversary and Thierry Fischer's debut as the new chief conductor for OSESP. Additionally, she debuted as Laura in Ponchielli's La Gioconda, a production of The Bumbry Way in Vienna, after working on repertoire expansion with Dr. Grace Bumbry, KS herself.

In 2021, after several productions were cancelled or rescheduled due to the COVID-19 pandemic, Pezzati was invited to perform at the George Enescu Festival in Bucharest, Romania. There, she debuted as Brigitta in Korngold's Die tote Stadt (concert version) at the Grand Palace Hall (Sala Palatului), with the George Enescu Philharmonic Orchestra and Choir, under the baton of Frédéric Chaslin.

== Theatres and performances (selection) ==
- Bunkamura Orchard Hall (Tokyo): Der Rosenkavalier (Strauss), La Traviata (Verdi)
- Teatro La Fenice (Veneza): Elektra (Strauss)
- Opernhaus Zürich: L'Incoronazione di Poppea, Faust, Boris Godunov, Lucia di Lammermoor, Tiefland, Rigoletto, Der Fliegende Holländer
- Konzerthaus Berlin: Symphony No. 9 (Beethoven), Orpheus und Euridyke (Krenek)
- Theatro Municipal de São Paulo: Te Deum Budavari (Kodaly), Orfeo ed Euridice, Pelléas et Mélisande
- Royal Festival Hall (London): Rosenkavalier, L'Incoronazione di Poppea
- Tonhalle, Zürich: Faust Szenen (Schubert), Mass in F minor (Bruckner), Walpurgisnacht (Mendelssohn)
- Moscow International House of Music: St John's Passion (Bach)
- Teatro Amazonas (Manaus): Les Troyens (Berlioz), Pelléas et Melisande (Debussy)
- Theater und Philharmonie Essen: Messiah (Handel)
- Orchestra Sinfonica di Milano Giuseppe Verdi: Elias (Mendelssohn)
- Concertgebouw (Amsterdam): El Amor Brujo (M. de Falla), Symphony No. 1 (Hartmann), Die Frau ohne Schatten (Strauss)
- Berliner Philharmonie: Wagner Zyklus: Das Rheingold, Die Walküre, Götterdämmerung. Parsifal (Wagner)
- Teatro del Liceu (Barcelona): Die Walküre (Wagner)
- Theatro Municipal do Rio de Janeiro: Medée (Cherubini)
- Teatro Solis (Montevideo): Faust et Helene (Lili Boulanger), Rückert-Lieder (Mahler)
- Teatro Petruzzelli (Bari): Elektra (Strauss), Der Fliegende Holländer (Wagner)
- Sala São Paulo: Cecilia (M. Buchala), Missa Solemnis (Beethoven)
- Theatro São Pedro (São Paulo): A Midsummer Night's Dream (Britten)
- Liederhalle Stuttgart: El Amor Brujo (M. de Falla), Christmas Oratorio (Bach), Jean d'Arc au bûcher (Arthur Honegger)
- Köln Oper (Cologne): Die Eroberung von Mexiko (W. Rihm), Die Soldaten (Henze), Le Nozze di Figaro (Mozart)
- Aalto Theater (Essen): Rheingold and Siegfried (Wagner)
- Théatre de Caen: Der Fliegende Holländer (Wagner)
- Grand Théâtre de Luxembourg: Der Fliegende Holländer (Wagner)
- Opéra-Théâtre de Saint-Étienne: Rigoletto (Verdi), Rake's Progress (Strawinsky)
- Teatro Mayor (Bogotá): Falstaff (Verdi)
- Auditório León de Greiff (Bogotá): Symphony No. 2 and Symphony No. 8 (Mahler), Folk Songs (Berio)
- Simon Bolivar Hall (Caracas): Mass in B minor (Bach), Jean d'Arc au bûcher (Arthur Honegger)
- De Doelen (Rotterdam): Symphony No. 1 (Hartmann)

== Roles in operas (selection) ==
- Amneris, Aida (Verdi, G.) *
- Anna, Les Troyens (Berlioz, H.)
- Annina, Der Rosenkavalier (Strauss, R.)
- Azucena, Il Trovatore (Verdi, G.) *
- Brigitta, Die tote Stadt (Korngold, E. W.)
- Carmen, Carmen (Bizet, G.)
- Clarice, La Pietra del Paragone (Rossini, G.)
- Dalila, Samson et Dalila (Saint-Säens, C.) *
- Eboli, Don Carlo (Verdi, G.) *
- Erda, Das Rheingold (Wagner, R.)
- Erda, Siegfried (Wagner, R.)
- Filipjewna, Eugen Onegin (Tschaikowski, P.)
- Fricka, Das Rheingold (Wagner, R.)
- Fricka, Die Walküre (Wagner, R.) *
- Geneviève, Pelléas et Mélisande (Debussy, C.)
- Isabella, L'Italiana in Algeri (Rossini, G.) *
- Jokasta, Oedipus Rex (Strawinski, I.)
- Laura, La Gioconda (Ponchielli, A.)
- Leonora, La Favorita (Donizzeti, G.) *
- Maddalena, Rigoletto (Verdi, G.)
- Marcellina, Le Nozze di Figaro (Mozart, W. A.)
- Mother, The Consul (Menotti, G. C.)
- Ms. Quickly, Falstaff (Verdi, G.)
- Oberon, Midsummer Night's Dream (Britten, B.)
- Olga, Eugen Onegin (Tschaikowski, P.) *
- Orfeo, Orfeo ed Euridice (Gluck, C. W.)
- Orsini, Lucrezia Borgia (Donizetti, G.)
- Penelope, Il Ritorno di Ulisse in Patria (Monteverdi, C.) *
- Rosalia, Tiefland (D'Albert, E.)
- Weseners Mutter, Die Soldaten (Zimmermann, B.)

(*) Roles studied but not yet performed in productions

== Concerts (selection) ==
- Bach, J.S. – Messe in H-moll, Weihnachtsoratorium, Magnificat, St. Johannes Passion, Matthäus Passion*
- Beethoven, L. van – Missa Solemnis, Symphony No. 9
- Berio, L. – Folk Songs
- Berlioz, H. – Romeo et Juliette
- Boulanger, L. – Faust et Heléne
- Derungs, G. A. – Henry Dunant op. 178, ein dramatisches Menschenleben
- Dvorák, A. – Stabat Mater*
- Estrada, C. – Robayat
- Falla, M. de – El Amor Brujo, Siete Canciones Españolas
- Favre, C. – Requiem
- Garcia Lorca, F. – Trece Canciones Populares Españolas
- Guastavino, C. – Flores Argentinas
- Händel, G. F. – Messiah
- Hartmann, K. A. – 1. Sinfonie: Versuch eines Requiems
- Kodály, Z. – Te Deum Budávari
- Mahler, G. – 2. Sinfonie, 3. Sinfonie* und 8. Sinfonie, Kindertotenlieder, Rückert-Lieder
- Martin, F. – In Terra Pax
- Mendelssohn, F. – Elias, Paulus*, Walpurgisnacht
- Mozart, W. A. – Requiem
- Pergolesi, G. B. – Stabat Mater
- Rossini, G. – Stabat Mater
- Schumann, R. – Faust Szenen (Marthe / Mangel / Mater Gloriosa / Mulier Samaritana)
- Strawinski, I. – Oedipus Rex, Les Noces
- Szymanowski, K. – Stabat Mater
- Verdi, G. – Requiem
- Wagner-Henze – Wesendonck Lieder

(*) Roles studied but not yet performed in concerts

== Collaborations with conductors (selection) ==
- Sir Simon Rattle
- Nikolaus Harnoncourt
- Lorin Maazel
- Nello Santi
- Christoph von Dohnányi
- Vladimir Fedoseyev
- Bernard Haitink
- Vladimir Jurowski
- Marek Janowski
- Teodor Currentzis
- Helmuth Rilling
- Lothar Koenigs
- François-Xavier Roth
- Franz Welser-Möst
- Ingo Metzmacher
- Paolo Carignani
- Ralf Weikert
- Laurent Campellone
- Thomas Adès
- Luiz Fernando Malheiro
- Ádám Fischer
- Axel Kober
- Facundo Agudin
- Peter Kuhn
- Daniel Harding
- Alexander Liebreich
- Florian Ludwig
- Enrique Diemecke
- Lothar Zagrosek
- Stefan Soltesz
- Matthias Foremny
- Otto Tausk
- Nicolau de Figueiredo
- Abel Rocha
- Markus Stenz
- Jonathan Nott
- Josep Pons
- Arie van Beek
- Valentina Peleggi

== Recordings ==
- Hildegard von Bingen & Silvia Berg: Hildegard Now & Then (2019); Pessatti, Hatch; CD Drama Musica
- Maury Buchala: Cecilia (2016); Orquestra Sinfônica do Estado de São Paulo (OSESP), Valentina Peleggi; CD Selo Digital OSESP
- Richard Wagner: Der fliegende Holländer (2015); Choeur et Orchestre Les Siècles, Théâtre de Caen, François-Xavier Roth; Live compilation
- Karl Hartmann: Symphonies 1–8 (2014); Netherlands Radio Philharmonic Orchestra, Netherlands Radio Chamber Orchestra; Gaffigan, Metzmacher, Poppen, Schonwandt, Stenz, Vänskä; Challenge Records, 3-disk CD set
- Richard Wagner: Die Walküre (2014); Orquestra Simfònica del Gran Teatre del Liceu Barcelona, Josep Pons; Live recording
- Richard Wagner: Götterdämmerung (2013); Rundfunk-Sinfonieorchester Berlin, Marek Janowski; CD Pentatone Music
- Richard Wagner: Die Walküre (2013); Rundfunk-Sinfonieorchester Berlin, Marek Janowski; CD Pentatone Music
- Richard Wagner: Das Rheingold (2013); Rundfunk-Sinfonieorchester Berlin, Marek Janowski; CD Pentatone Music
- Karl Hartmann: Eerste symfonie (2012); Radio Filharmonisch Orkest Amsterdam, Marcus Stenz; CD Avro Tros NTR Radio 4
- Arthur Honegger: Jeanne d'Arc au bûcher (2011); Radio-Sinfonieorchester Stuttgart des SWR, Helmuth Rilling; CD Hänssler Classic
- Giuseppe Verdi: Requiem (2011) Orchestre Symphonique du Jura, Facundo Agudin; DVD Lyrica
- Gustav Mahler: 8. Sinfonie, Mahler en Bogotá (2011); Orquesta Filarmônica de Bogotá, Enrique Diemecke; DVD EMI
- Christian Favre: Requiem (2010, World Premiere); Orchestre Symphonique du Jura, Facundo Agudin; CD Doron Music
- Eugen d'Albert: Tiefland (2009); Oper Zürich, Franz Welser-Möst; DVD EMI
- Richard Wagner: Parsifal (2008); Oper Zürich, Bernard Haitink; DVD Deutsche Grammophon
- Giuseppe Verdi: Rigoletto (2006); Oper Zürich, Nello Santi; DVD Arthaus Musik
- Richard Strauss: Elektra (2006); Oper Zürich, Christoph von Dohnanyi; DVD TDK
