= Eike Wilm Schulte =

German operatic baritone (1939–2025)

- Schulte c. 2010
- Born: 13 October 1939; Plettenberg, Gau Westphalia-South, German Reich
- Died: 31 October 2025 (aged 86); Germany
- Education: Musikhochschule Köln
- Occupation: Operatic baritone
- Organizations: Hessisches Staatstheater Wiesbaden; Bayerische Staatsoper; Bayreuth Festival
- Title: Kammersänger
- Awards: Goethe-Plakette des Landes Hessen

Eike Wilm Schulte (13 October 1939 – 31 October 2025) was a German operatic baritone. A member of the Hessisches Staatstheater Wiesbaden and the Bayerische Staatsoper, he made a career of more than fifty years, performing 119 roles. He appeared at major opera houses internationally, regularly at the Bayreuth Festival for twelve years and at the Metropolitan Opera. Signature roles of the versatile singer included Rossini's Figaro, Germont in Verdi's La traviata, Beckmesser in Wagner's Die Meistersinger von Nürnberg and Faninal in Der Rosenkavalier by R. Strauss. He participated in several opera premieres.

== Life and career ==
Schulte was born in Plettenberg on 13 October 1939. He studied voice at the Musikhochschule Köln from age 19, with Josef Metternich and Clemens Glettenberg, among others. He studied further at the Mozarteum in Salzburg.

=== Early career ===
Before completing his studies, Grischa Barfuss, the Intendant of the Deutsche Oper am Rhein invited him to the house where he made his stage debut in 1966 as Sid in Britten's Albert Herring. In 1969, he sang in the world premiere of Giselher Klebe's Das Märchen von der schönen Lilie at the Schwetzingen Festival in the Schlosstheater Schwetzingen. From 1969, Schulte was a member of the Theater Bielefeld, engaged by the music director Bernhard Conz. He learned new roles such as Dr. Falke in Die Fledermaus by J. Strauss, Kothner in Wagner's Die Meistersinger von Nürnberg, the Tsar in Lortzing's Zar und Zimmermann and Guglielmo in Mozart's Così fan tutte. He also appeared there as Papageno in Mozart's Die Zauberflöte, as Germont in La traviata and in the leading role of Alfred Ill in Gottfried von Einem's Der Besuch der alten Dame, alongside Martha Mödl in the title role, in the opera's German premiere.

=== Wiesbaden ===
From 1973 to 1988 Schulte was a member of the Hessisches Staatstheater Wiesbaden, where he performed major roles, including Telramund in Wagner's Lohengrin, Marcel in Puccini's La bohème, Lindorf, Coppelius, Dapertutto and Mirakel in Offenbach's Hoffmanns Erzählungen, alongside Hermin Esser in the title role, Elizabeth Parcells as Olympia and Gail Gilmore as Niklaus, and the Pharao in Rossini's Mosè, with Nadine Secunde. he performed in contemporary operas, including several premieres by Volker David Kirchner: as Henrik in Die Trauung in Wiesbaden in 1974, as Babel in Die fünf Minuten des Isaak Babel in Wuppertal in 1980, and as Ezechiel in Das kalte Herz in Wiesbaden in 1981. He appeared in 75 roles, many with music director Siegfried Köhler, and was especially celebrated for the title role of Hamlet by Ambroise Thomas.

=== Düsseldorf and Munich ===
Schulte performed at the Deutsche Oper am Rhein as Escamillo in Bizet's Carmen, as Frank and Pierrot in Korngold's Die tote Stadt, and the title role of Rossini's Il barbiere di Siviglia. From 1988 he was a member of the Bavarian State Opera for two decades, where he performed roles such as Don Fernando in Beethoven's Fidelio, Alidoro in Rossini's La Cenerentola, the Geisterbote in Die Frau ohne Schatten by R. Strauss, Faninal in Der Rosenkavalier, and Telramund in Lohengrin, directed by Richard Jones.

=== Bayreuth ===
Schulte performed at the Bayreuth Festival for twelve years, beginning in 1988 as the Heerrufer in Lohengrin, and from 1992 as Wolfram von Eschenbach in Tannhäuser; in 1998 he stepped in as Gunther in Götterdämmerung, singing but not acting.

=== International opera ===
At the Metropolitan Opera (Met) in New York City, Schulte made his debut in 1991 as the Speaker in Die Zauberflöte, conducted by James Levine, followed by Faninal in 1993, conducted by Christian Thielemann.

He performed as the Herald in Lohengrin at La Monnaie in Brussels in 1990, and appeared the same year at the Théâtre du Châtelet in Paris as Beckmesser, performing the role also at the Berlin State Opera and the Deutsche Oper Berlin in 1993, and at the Staatsoper Dresden in 1994. He performed as Faninal at the Hamburg State Opera and at the Cologne Opera.

Schulte portrayed Beckmesser at the Met in 2001; reviewer Paul Griffiths from the New York Times noted: ""Eike Wilm Schulte's clown act as Beckmesser is all the funnier for being precisely timed to the music and for being limited to his movements, gestures and facial expressions. He well knows he can sing the music straight: it has comedy all its own.". He performed the role again the Vienna State Opera in 2002, directed by Otto Schenk and conducted by Leopold Hager. In 2005, he performed the role of the 1st Shepherd in Daphne by R. Strauss, with Renée Fleming in the title role and the WDR Symphony Orchestra Cologne conducted by Semyon Bychkov. When they toured at the Kennedy Center in Washington, D.C., reviewer Jens Laurson singled him out, noting his "clarity, diction, volume, and richness of sound". He appeared as Peter in Humperdinck's Hänsel und Gretel at the Royal Opera House in London in 2008. The same year he returned to the Met as Kurwenal in Wagner's Tristan und Isolde. Schulte performed as a guest also at La Scala in Milan, La Fenice in Venice, and the Liceu in Barcelona, among others.

=== Concert ===
Schulte appeared in recitals and concerts. He performed in Bruckner's Mass No. 1 in 1996 as part of the Wiener Festwochen, with John Eliot Gardiner conducting the Monteverdi Choir and the Vienna Philharmonic. In 1997, he was the baritone soloist in Ein deutsches Requiem by Brahms on a tour of the Wiener Singverein with soprano Ruth Ziesak and the Orchestre Philharmonique de Radio France conducted by Marek Janowski, to the Laon Cathedral, the Salle Pleyel in Paris, the Auditorio nacional de musica in Madrid and Palau de la Música de València. He appeared in a concert of the Salzburg Festival that year in Bruckner's Te Deum, with the choir of the Slovak Philharmonic and the Berlin Philharmonic conducted by Claudio Abbado. He took part as a soloist in Beethoven's Ninth Symphony with the Berlin Philharmonic conducted by Claudio Abbado in 2000, both at the Berliner Philharmonie and for the 50th anniversary of Sony in Tokyo. He sang in Mahler's Eighth Symphony in Tanglewood, conducted by James Levine, and an open-air concert in Paris with both the Orchestre National de France and the Boston Symphony Orchestra conducted by Seiji Ozawa. He performed as a soloist in Haydn's Die Schöpfung, Beethoven's Missa solemnis, Mendelssohn's Elias, and Schoenberg's Gurrelieder.

=== Later years ===
In 2010, Schulte sang Telramund in a concert version of Lohengrin in Birmingham conducted by Andris Nelsons; a reviewer from The Guardian described his interpretation as "wonderfully judged and articulated". He appeared as Klingsor in Parsifal, recorded live in a concert on 8 April 2011, with Christian Elsner in the title role and Marek Janowski conducting the Berlin Radio Symphony Orchestra. A reviewer noted that he was "wonderfully malevolent" but that he never overdid it and was "thoroughly musical". Schulte performed as the Music teacher in Ariadne auf Naxos by R. Strauss at the 2012 Baden-Baden Festival, conducted by Christian Thielemann, when Fleming made her debut in the title role. His last role in a new production was Kothner in Die Meistersinger von Nürnberg at the Bavarian State Opera in 2016, directed by David Bösch and conducted by Kirill Petrenko. In 2017, he appeared in a concert at Christchurch, performing excerpts as Papageno and Beckmesser, praised for "a mesmeric presence".

When Schulte completed 50 years of performing, he had sung 119 opera roles and 35 different concert works, at more than 70 theaters and at 26 festivals, working with 120 stage directors, including Dieter Dorn, August Everding, Götz Friedrich, Harry Kupfer, Thomas Langhoff, and Peter Stein, and 190 conductors including Daniel Barenboim, Christoph von Dohnányi, Rafael Frühbeck de Burgos, Zubin Mehta, Riccardo Muti, Esa-Pekka Salonen, Wolfgang Sawallisch, Giuseppe Sinopoli, and Heinz Wallberg.

== Personal life ==
Schulte was married to Elisabeth; they lived in Wiesbaden and in Herscheid, where he led a choir and organised concerts.

Schulte died on 31 October 2025 at the age of 86.

== Awards ==
Schulte became an honorary member of the Hessisches Staatstheater in 1993. In 2008, he received the Goethe-Plakette des Landes Hessen, the highest award of the Hessian Ministry for Science and the Arts. He was granted the title Kammersänger by the Hessisches Staatstheater in 2010, as the first recipient of the honour in Hesse. A gala concert was given there in 2015 to celebrate his 50th stage jubilee, including the competition scene from Die Meistersinger von Nürnberg as Beckmesser with René Kollo as Stolzing.

== Discography ==
Schulte appeared in live recordings as the Heerrufer from Bayreuth, and as Beckmesser in Die Meistersinger von Nürnberg from Deutsche Oper Berlin. He recorded Schumann's Das Paradies und die Peri with Simone Kermes in the title role, the EuropaChorAkademie and the Pforzheim Chamber Orchestra, conducted by Joshard Daus in 2001. He recorded the role of Amfortas in Wagner's Parsifal live the same year, with choir and orchestra of the Deutsche Oper Berlin conducted by Thielemann, and Robert Dean Smith in the title role. He performed the title role of Johann Adolph Hasse's L'artigiano gentiluomo for television. His recording of Die schweigsame Frau by R. Strauss, with Pinchas Steinberg conducting the Bavarian Radio Symphony Orchestra and Cyndia Seiden in the title role, was reviewed as "superb in his own understated way".

- Haydn (1995), Die Schöpfung, London: Decca, OCLC 972902687
- Der Schöpfung Preis und Dank, Wiesbaden: Cappella-Musikproduktion und -Verlag, 1995, OCLC 1183584116
- Eine musikalische Weinprobe, Berlin: DSB Deutsche Schallplatten, 1997, OCLC 1183532212
- Kammermusik am Nassauischen Hof zu Wiesbaden, Wiesbaden: Melisma-Musik, 1999, OCLC 164597202
- Bruckner (2001), Mass No. 1, Hamburg: Deutsche Grammophon, OCLC 948504810
- Mahler (2006), Symphony No. 8, London: EMI Classics, OCLC 938768841
- Beethoven (2007), Symphony No. 9, EuroArts Music International, OCLC 871881522
- Wagner (2012), Parsifal, PentaTone Classics, OCLC 811644614
- Strauss, Richard (2012), Ariadne auf Naxos, Mainz: ZDF, OCLC 984763870
- Mozart (2013). Die Zauberflöte. ORF. OCLC 876201634.

=== Video ===
- Wagner (2004), Die Meistersinger von Nürnberg, Leipzig: Arthaus Musik Kinowelt Home Entertainment, OCLC 55589255
- Wagner (2008), Lohengrin, Deutsche Grammophon, OCLC 230829740
- Strauss, Richard (2013), Ariadne auf Naxos, OCLC 874475437
