= Robert D. Smith =

Robert D. Smith may refer to:

- Bobby Smith (ice hockey) (born 1958), Canadian ice hockey forward
- Robert Dean Smith (born 1956), American operatic tenor
