= Robert Dean Smith =

American operatic tenor (born 1956)

Robert Dean Smith (born 2 May 1956 in Kansas) is an American operatic tenor.

Smith studied at Pittsburg State University (Kansas), at the Juilliard School of Music in New York City with Daniel Ferro, and in Europe. Like many dramatic tenors, he began his career as a baritone and sang for several years in German opera houses. He sings a variety of opera and concert repertoire, in different languages and styles.

From 2007 to 2008 he performed Lohengrin and Die Meistersinger in Dresden; Die Frau ohne Schatten at the Lyric Opera of Chicago with Deborah Voigt and Christine Brewer; Tristan und Isolde at the Madrid Teatro Real and the Bayreuth Festival; Tannhäuser at the Berlin Staatsoper; Der fliegende Holländer at the Bavarian State Opera (Bayerische Staatsoper) in Munich and the Vienna State Opera; Ariadne auf Naxos at the Royal Opera, London at Covent Garden; and Fidelio in Tokyo.

On March 22, 2008, Smith made his Metropolitan Opera debut as the lead role in Tristan und Isolde — which was broadcast in the Met's Live in HD series in cinemas in the US, and also aired live on NPR and other radio stations in the US and abroad, as part of the live Metropolitan Opera International Radio Network season. Smith was brought in to replace an ailing Ben Heppner.

In January 2015, during the final scene of Tristan und Isolde with Elisabete Matos at the Théâtre du Capitole de Toulouse, a 210 kg fake rock suspended over Smith as the recently dead Tristan began descending. When Smith noticed it was not stopping he rolled away and quickly got to his feet, provoking laughter from the audience. There was a subsequent investigation into “l’affaire du rocher”, concluding with the conviction and eight-month prison sentence of a stagehand for sabotage.

== Discography ==
- Mahler – Das Lied von der Erde. Vladimir Jurowski, Sarah Connolly, Robert Dean Smith, Rundfunk-Sinfonieorchester Berlin. PENTATONE PTC 5186760 (2020)
- Wagner – Die Walküre. Tomasz Konieczny, Iris Vermillion, Robert Dean Smith, Timo Riihonen, Petra Lang, Marek Janowski, Nicole Piccolomini, Kismara Pessatti, Anja Fidelia Ulrich, Fionnuala McCarthy, Heike Wessels, Carola Höhn, Wilke te Brummelstroete, Renate Spingler, Melanie Diener, Rundfunk-Sinfonieorchester Berlin. PENTATONE PTC 5186407 (2013)
- Wagner – Tannhäuser. Albert Dohmen, Robert Dean Smith, Christian Gerhaher, Peter Sonn, Wilhelm Schwinghammer, Michael McCown, Martin Snel, Nina Stemme, Marina Prudenskaya, Bianca Reim, Marek Janowski, Rundfunk-Sinfonieorchester Berlin, Rundfunkchor Berlin. PENTATONE PTC 5186405 (2013)
- Wagner – Die Meistersinger von Nürnberg. Albert Dohmen, Georg Zeppenfeld, Michael Smallwood, Sebastian Noack, Dietrich Henschel, Tuomas Pursio, Jörg Schörner, Thomas Ebenstein, Thorsten Scharnke, Tobias Berndt, Hans-Peter Scheidegger, Lee Hyung-Wook, Robert Dean Smith, Peter Sonn, Edith Haller, Michelle Breedt, Matti Salminen, Marek Janowski, Rundfunk-Sinfonieorchester Berlin, Rundfunkchor Berlin. PENTATONE PTC 5186402 (2011)
- Wagner – Der fliegende Holländer. Matti Salminen, Ricarda Merbeth, Robert Dean Smith, Silvia Hablowetz, Steve Davislim, Albert Dohmen, Marek Janowski. PENTATONE PTC 5186400 (2011)
