= Bruno Seidler-Winkler =

German conductor, pianist and music arranger

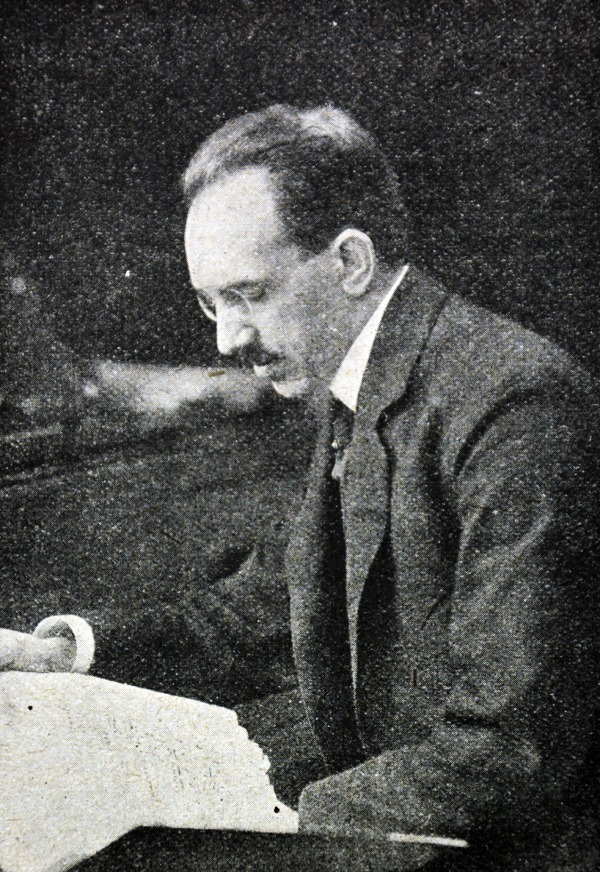
Bruno Seidler-Winkler

Karl Ludwig Bruno Seidler-Winkler (18 July 1880 – 19 October 1960) was a German conductor, pianist and music arranger.

== Life ==
Seidler-Winkler was born in Berlin as the son of a musician and already made his musical appearance in his youth. He received his first training at the Stern Conservatory at the piano with Ernst Jedliczka. He sang in the choir of the Berliner Dom. At the age of ten, he also played the violin and was considered a gifted pianist; four years later, he conducted in a small theatre in Berlin. As the artistic recording director of the German Edison company, he became acquainted with and mastered the possibilities of sound recording as early as the 1890s.

He was then able to contribute his experience to the newly founded Deutsche Grammophon label. From 1903 to 1923, he was their artistic director and responsible for a large number of sound recordings. He directed recordings of the opera ensembles of Berlin, Dresden, Munich, and Vienna and organised the necessary recording facilities and rooms. The acoustic recording technique used in the first years of recording was associated with many technical problems and limitations. Bruno Seidler-Winkler's arrangements, however, were already extraordinarily effective in achieving the desired effect for the individual composers. He was one of the first house conductors to lead the Deutsche Grammophon Orchestra. Thus, in 1908, the first complete recording of the opera Carmen by Georges Bizet was made under his direction (with Ema Destinová in the leading role) and in 1923, when he left Deutsche Grammophon, the first complete recording of the 9th Symphony by Beethoven. He was also active as a conductor from 1903 to 1932. From 1923 to 1925 he worked as an orchestra leader in Chicago and from 1926 to September 1932, as a predecessor of Eugen Jochum, conducted the Rundfunk-Sinfonieorchester Berlin of the Funk-Stunde Berlin, as well as the Berlin State Opera orchestra and the Berlin Volksopera throughout the 1930s and war years.

He also accompanied recordings of well-known artists - singers and instrumentalists - as a pianist. Numerous recordings have been preserved that were made with the singer Otto Reutter, from 1902 until shortly after the First World War; as well as with Váša Příhoda. From the beginning of the 1930s he was engaged at the Universität der Künste Berlin in the training of young artists for the musical design of radio programmes. He worked as an arranger in the middle of the 1930s for the Meistersextett. In 1938, he was involved in the first electric recording of the opera Die Walküre by Richard Wagner, which had been planned since the beginning of the 1930s and then begun in 1935 in Vienna by Bruno Walter and the Wiener Symphoniker. The missing parts of the second act were recorded under his direction in Berlin for Electrola. Also in 1938 he accompanied the young French violinist Ginette Neveu on her first recordings.

His repertoire included classical music as well as light music such as operettas, chansons, and hits. He arranged the recording of the song "Lili Marleen" with Lale Andersen in 1939. He also conducted the instrumental ensemble that accompanied the recording.

In 1913, he became a member of the Berlin masonic lodge Zum Widder. The soprano Brigitta Seidler-Winkler, born in 1936, is his daughter.

A few months before his death, he was awarded the Bundesverdienstkreuz in 1960.

Seidler-Winkler died in Berlin at age 80. He was buried in the state-owned cemetery In den Kisseln in Spandau (Berlin).
