= Stephen Gould (tenor) =

American heldentenor (1962–2023)

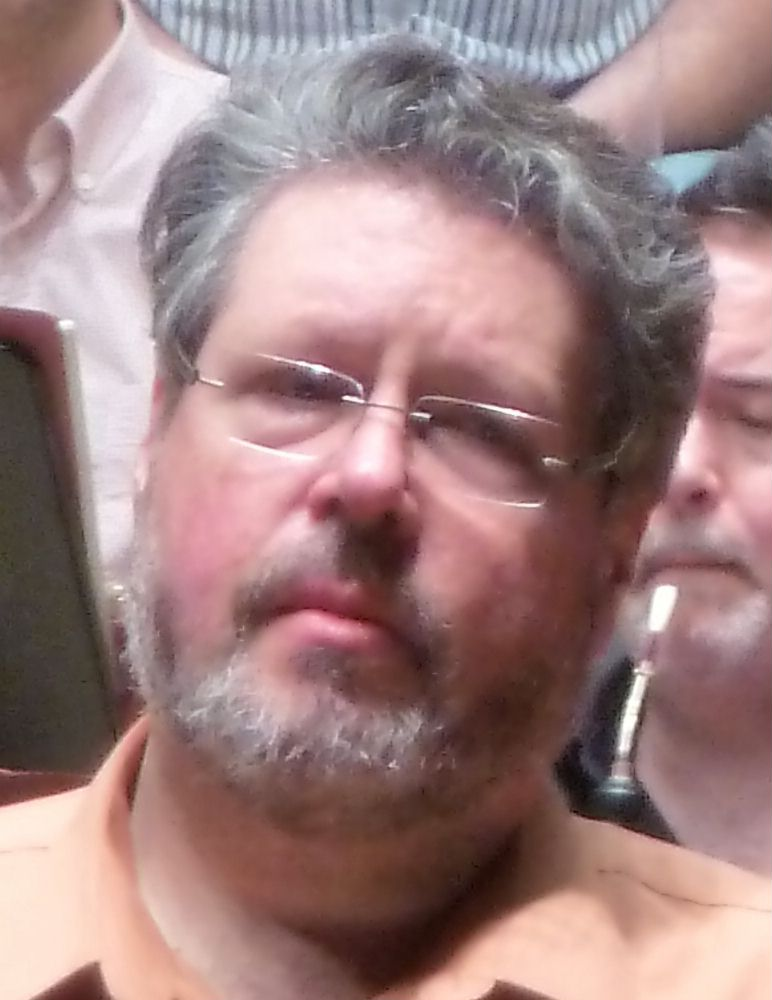
- Gould in a rehearsal for Tristan, Palacio da ópera, A Coruña, 2013
- Born: January 24, 1962; Roanoke, Virginia, U.S.
- Died: September 19, 2023 (aged 61); Chesapeake, Virginia, U.S.
- Education: Olivet Nazarene University; New England Conservatory of Music
- Occupation: Heldentenor
- Organizations: Bayreuth Festival; Vienna State Opera
- Title: Austrian Kammersänger
- Website: www.stephengould.org

Stephen Grady Gould (January 24, 1962 – September 19, 2023) was an American heldentenor and leading interpreter of Richard Wagner's stage works. He performed around 100 times at the Bayreuth Festival, notably as Tannhäuser starting in 2004, and later Siegfried and Tristan. In 2022, his performance in all three roles earned him nicknames such as Iron Man.

Gould appeared at leading opera houses worldwide. His non-Wagner repertoire included the roles of Paul in Korngold's Die tote Stadt, Bacchus in Strauss' Ariadne auf Naxos, the title role of Britten's Peter Grimes, the Emperor in Strauss' Die Frau ohne Schatten, the title role of Verdi's Otello, Aeneas in Berlioz's Les Troyens, and the title role of William Bolcom's McTeague. In concert, he performed in Beethoven's Ninth Symphony, Schoenberg's Gurre-Lieder, and Mahler's Das Lied von der Erde.

== Life and career ==
Stephen Grady Gould was born in Roanoke, Virginia, on January 24, 1962, the son of Loren Gould, a Baptist minister, and Annie (née Brown), a pianist who taught at schools. Gould first studied as a baritone at Olivet Nazarene University, graduating with a Bachelor of Arts in 1984. He later studied at the New England Conservatory of Music in Boston with John Moriarty, and then became a member of the Lyric Opera of Chicago Center for American Art.

In 1989, he stepped in for Chris Merritt at the Los Angeles Opera as Argirio in Rossini's Tancredi, alongside Marilyn Horne. Without a permanent operatic engagement, Gould auditioned for the first U.S. tour of Andrew Lloyd Webber's The Phantom of the Opera and was accepted, performing in male roles for over 3,000 performances.

=== Tenor ===
After leaving The Phantom of the Opera, Gould thought that his singing career was effectively over, until he met and began studying with John Fiorito, a voice teacher connected to the Metropolitan Opera in New York City, who completely reworked Gould's vocal technique so he could sing heldentenor repertoire. On Fiorito's advice, Gould temporarily abandoned performing and studied with Fiorito for three years in the evenings in conjunction with a day job. In January 2000, he first appeared in a heldentenor role at the Landestheater Linz as Florestan in Beethoven's Fidelio. He was invited by Zubin Mehta to perform as Melot in Wagner's Tristan und Isolde at the Bavarian State Opera in 2001, in a production directed by Peter Konwitschny. In 2002, he appeared as Aeneas in Les Troyens by Berlioz at the Maggio Musicale Fiorentino with Mehta, and a year later at the same festival as Verdi's Otello. He performed his first leading Wagner role at the Landestheater Linz in 2002 as Tannhäuser.

==== Bayreuth ====
Gould first appeared at the Bayreuth Festival in 2004 as Tannhäuser, conducted by Christian Thielemann. In 2006 he performed at the festival in the role of Siegfried in Wagner's Der Ring des Nibelungen, staged by Tankred Dorst and conducted again by Thielemann. "Tannhäuser's character is more appropriate to me than Siegfried", said Gould to Forum Opéra in December 2007. He first performed as Tristan there in 2015, directed by Katharina Wagner and conducted by Thielemann. He appeared as Siegmund in Die Walküre in 2018, and as Parsifal in a concert performance in 2021. Gould performed at the festival around 100 times in 20 productions. Singing Tannhäuser, Siegfried and Tristan at the 2022 festival earned him the nicknames Wagner Marathon Man and Iron Man. Tannhäuser was then the production staged by Tobias Kratzer, with the title role as a sad clown, and Götterdämmerung was staged by Valentin Schwarz. Gould said in an interview then: "Wagner is meditation, a mantra", hoping for spiritual depth, not entertainment.

==== Vienna State Opera ====
Gould first performed at the Vienna State Opera as Paul in the 2004 production of Korngold's Die tote Stadt. He performed Wagner roles several times there over the years. He appeared as Erik in Wagner's Der fliegende Holländer from 2007, as Bacchus in Ariadne auf Naxos by Richard Strauss from 2012, in the title role of Britten's Peter Grimes in 2016, as Tristan in 2018, as the Emperor in Die Frau ohne Schatten by Richard Strauss in 2019, and as Verdi's Otello in 2020. At the State Opera, he appeared on stage in 105 performances.

==== Other opera houses ====
Gould appeared as Paul in Die tote Stadt in the opera's British premiere at the Royal Opera House in London in 2009, praised for his portrayal of the character "gripped by the memory of his dead wife". He performed the title role of Peter Grimes in Geneva, as Tannhäuser at Las Palmas and also in Rome, and as Otello in Tokyo. He appeared at the Dresden Semperoper in new productions of Die Liebe der Danae by Richard Strauss and Otello; as Tannhäuser in Tokyo, Paris and Geneva; as Erik in Der fliegende Holländer at the Metropolitan Opera in 2010, the Bavarian State Opera and the Palermo Opera; as Wagner's Lohengrin in Trieste; as Bacchus in Ariadne auf Naxos; and as Parsifal at the Graz Opera. In a new production of the Ring cycle in Tokyo, he took the roles of Loge, Siegmund and Siegfried. In 2016, he performed the title role of William Bolcom's McTeague. He appeared as Aegisth in Elektra by Richard Strauss in a concert performance in Berlin.

==== Concert ====
In concert, Gould performed Beethoven's Ninth Symphony and Missa solemnis, Schoenberg's Gurre-Lieder, and Mahler's Eighth Symphony and Das Lied von der Erde. Gould worked with conductors such as Daniel Barenboim, Ádám Fischer, Zubin Mehta, Seiji Ozawa, Kirill Petrenko, Simon Rattle, and Esa-Pekka Salonen.

=== Personal life ===
Gould lived alternately in the United States and Austria or Germany.

On August 25, 2023, he announced his retirement from singing "due to health reasons"; he had to cancel three major roles at the Bayreuth Festival. He announced a diagnosis of terminal bile duct cancer via his personal website on September 5. Gould died in Chesapeake, Virginia, on September 19, 2023, at age 61.

== Recordings ==
Gould's performances in Bayreuth were broadcast internationally and recorded, including Siegfried with Thielemann in 2009. He recorded Tristan und Isolde, with Nina Stemme as Isolde and the Rundfunk-Sinfonieorchester Berlin conducted by Marek Janowski in 2012 and Siegfried with the same orchestra and conductor in 2013. He recorded a DVD of act 2 from Tristan und Isolde, with Christine Goerke as Isolde, the National Symphony Orchestra, conducted by Gianandrea Noseda in 2019. The same year, he appeared as the Emperor in a recording of Die Frau ohne Schatten by Strauss taken at the Vienna State Opera conducted by Thielemann. A reviewer noted: "Every note is there with complete security, and the slightly dusky colour of his voice give him a particular colour."

In concert, Gould recorded Beethoven's Ninth Symphony with the Atlanta Symphony Orchestra and chorus conducted by Donald Runnicles in 2003. He recorded the tenor solo of Mahler's Symphony No. 8 as part of the live recordings of all Mahler symphonies with Riccardo Chailly conducting the MDR Rundfunkchor, the opera chorus Leipzig, the GewandhausChor, the Thomanerchor and the Gewandhausorchester, as part of the International Mahler Festival in Leipzig in 2011. He recorded Schoenberg's Gurre-Lieder in 2020 with the MDR Rundfunkchor, the Staatsopernchor Dresden and the Staatskapelle Dresden joined by members of Gustav Mahler Jugendorchester, conducted by Thielemann, singing the role of Waldemar.

== Awards ==
Gould received a Grammy Award nomination in the Best Opera Recording category for his performance in the Deutsche Grammophon recording Der Ring des Nibelungen at the 56th Annual Grammy Awards in 2014. He was awarded the title of an Austrian Kammersänger in 2015.

== Publications ==
His book, Performing Wagner: A Singer’s Perspective on the Major Tenor Roles, was a result of Zoom conversations between Gould and F. Peter Phillips during the COVID-19 pandemic. It contains chapters on the roles of Tannhäuser, Tristan, Siegfried, Lohengrin and Parsifal, Further two chapters deal with conductors, stage directions and vocal technique. The epilogue, "Colleagues Remember Stephen Gould" features tributes from Ekaterina Gubanova, Petra Lang, Michael Volle and others. Katharina Wagner contributed the foreword.
