= Teatro São Pedro =

Theater in São Paulo, Brazil

São Pedro Theater
- Teatro São Pedro
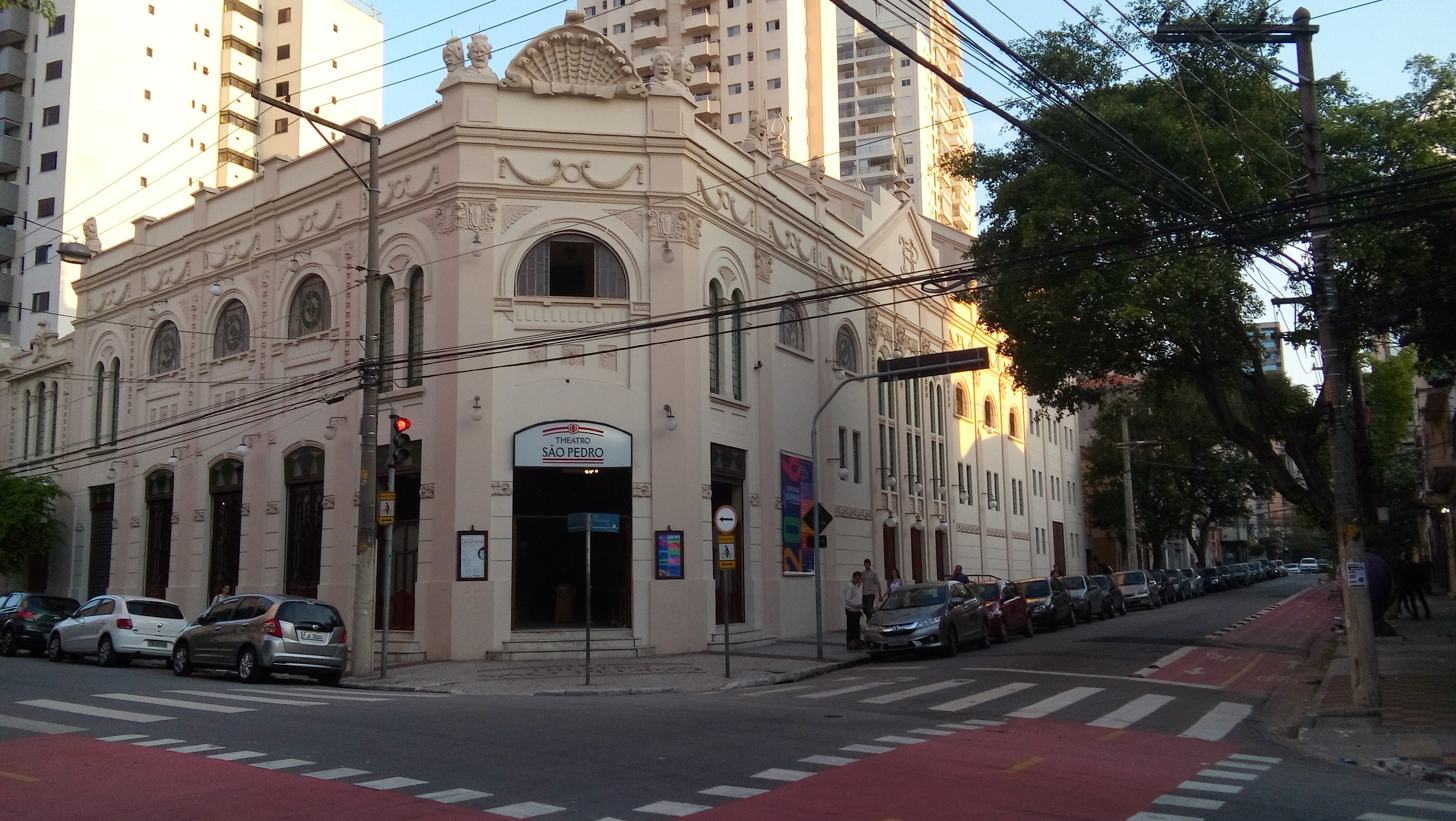

- Location within São Paulo Location within Brazil

General information
- Architectural style: Eclecticism
- Location: São Paulo, São Paulo; Brazil
- Coordinates: 23°31′59″S 46°39′11″W
- Inaugurated: January 20, 1917

Design and construction
- Architect: Augusto Bernadelli Marquesini
- Developer: Manuel Fernandes Lopes

Other information
- Seating capacity: 636

Website
- www.theatrosaopedro.org.br

Teatro São Pedro (English: São Pedro Theater) is located in São Paulo, Brazil. It was created by the Portuguese Manuel Fernandes Lopes and inaugurated on January 20, 1917 with the performances of the plays A Moreninha and O Escravo de Lúcifer. It is the second oldest operating theater in São Paulo.

== History ==
The theater was inaugurated on January 20, 1917, four days later than expected due to an embargo by São Paulo City Hall. It is the second oldest theater in the city; the first is the Municipal Theater, which opened in 1911. Before its official inauguration, the venue was revered as an outstanding luxury center for entertainment and arts. It featured a neoclassical style with art nouveau inspiration, 28 front rows, 28 boxes and balconies with more than 100 seats.

=== Cinema ===
After the 1920s, the theater functioned as a movie theater, offering occasional theatrical performances. In 1941, it closed and became exclusively part of the commercial circuit of cinemas owned by Empresas Reunidas, Metro G.M. and Serrador. In the 1960s, the auditorium was used as a storage area and parking lot.

=== New phase ===
In 1967, threatened with demolition, the São Pedro Theater was acquired by Fernando Torres, Fernanda Montenegro, Beatriz and Maurício Segall. After undergoing a renovation that involved the construction of 9 dressing rooms and toilets, the theater reopened on October 29, 1968. In the following years, the productions focused on creating new theatrical expressions to confront Institutional Act Number Five, a law imposed by the Costa e Silva government that increased censorship in Brazil.

Several plays and musicals performed on the São Pedro stage, such as: Marta Saré, by Gianfrancesco Guarnieri and Edu Lobo, Morte e Vida Severina, by João Cabral de Melo Neto and Chico Buarque, Hair, by James Rado, Macunaima, by Mário de Andrade, Ópera do Malandro, by Chico Buarque, and Calabar, by Chico Buarque and Rui Guerra (which premiered at São Pedro in 1980 after 7 years of censorship). Isaac Karabtchevsky, João Carlos Martins, José Eduardo Martins, Gilberto Tinetti, Caio Pagano and Diogo Pacheco also performed in the theater. An Enemy of the People, by Henrik Ibsen, was the first production presented by São Pedro Produções Artísticas, a company led by Maurício and Beatriz Segall in partnership with Fernando Torres.

In 1970, a second renovation occurred and the theater acquired new facilities. Besides the original hall with a 700-seat audience, Studio São Pedro, a smaller performance hall with seating for 200 people, opened. The inauguration took place with A Longa Noite de Cristal, directed by Celso Nunes. In 1971, Fernando Torres ended his partnership with the Segall couple and moved to Rio de Janeiro with Fernanda Montenegro.

In 1973, due to financial problems, the main stage was sublet to the São Paulo Secretary of Culture to be used as the headquarters of the São Paulo State Symphony Orchestra. In 1975, the Studio São Pedro premiered Os Executivos, by Mauro Chaves, the final production of São Pedro Produções Artísticas. Maurício Segall directed the theater until 1981, when it was sublet. In 1984, the building was listed as a landmark by CONDEPHAAT and declared of public utility for expropriation purposes. In 1998, after a renovation, it reopened as a classical music venue sponsored by the São Paulo Secretary of Culture.

In 2010, the São Pedro Theater Orchestra (Orthesp) was established under the direction of conductor Roberto Duarte. In 2013, the São Pedro Theater Opera Academy was founded to train and educate young singers. Besides participating in operas, members of the academy perform in annual concerts. In 2015, the theater established a partnership with the São Paulo Metro to present flash mobs and exhibitions of the costumes used in Falstaff by Giuseppe Verdi.

== Architecture ==
The theater's eclectic style, predominantly neoclassical with art nouveau details, was designed by the Italian architect Augusto Bernadelli Marquesini and built by Antônio Alves Villares da Silva. It covers a plot of 1,373 square meters on the corner of Albuquerque Lins and Barra Funda streets. At the opening, it contained a waiting room, 28 front rows and 28 boxes, balconies for over 100 chairs and an audience with 800 seats. The horseshoe-shaped floor plan was designed for mixed functions. The stage had a 4-meter proscenium that transformed into a pit for 50 musicians.

In 1921, Augusto Marquesini designed an office over the entrance to the side area, which had already been renovated. Further modernizations were carried out in the following year. Currently, the venue has 636 seats and offers operas and concerts.

== Gallery ==
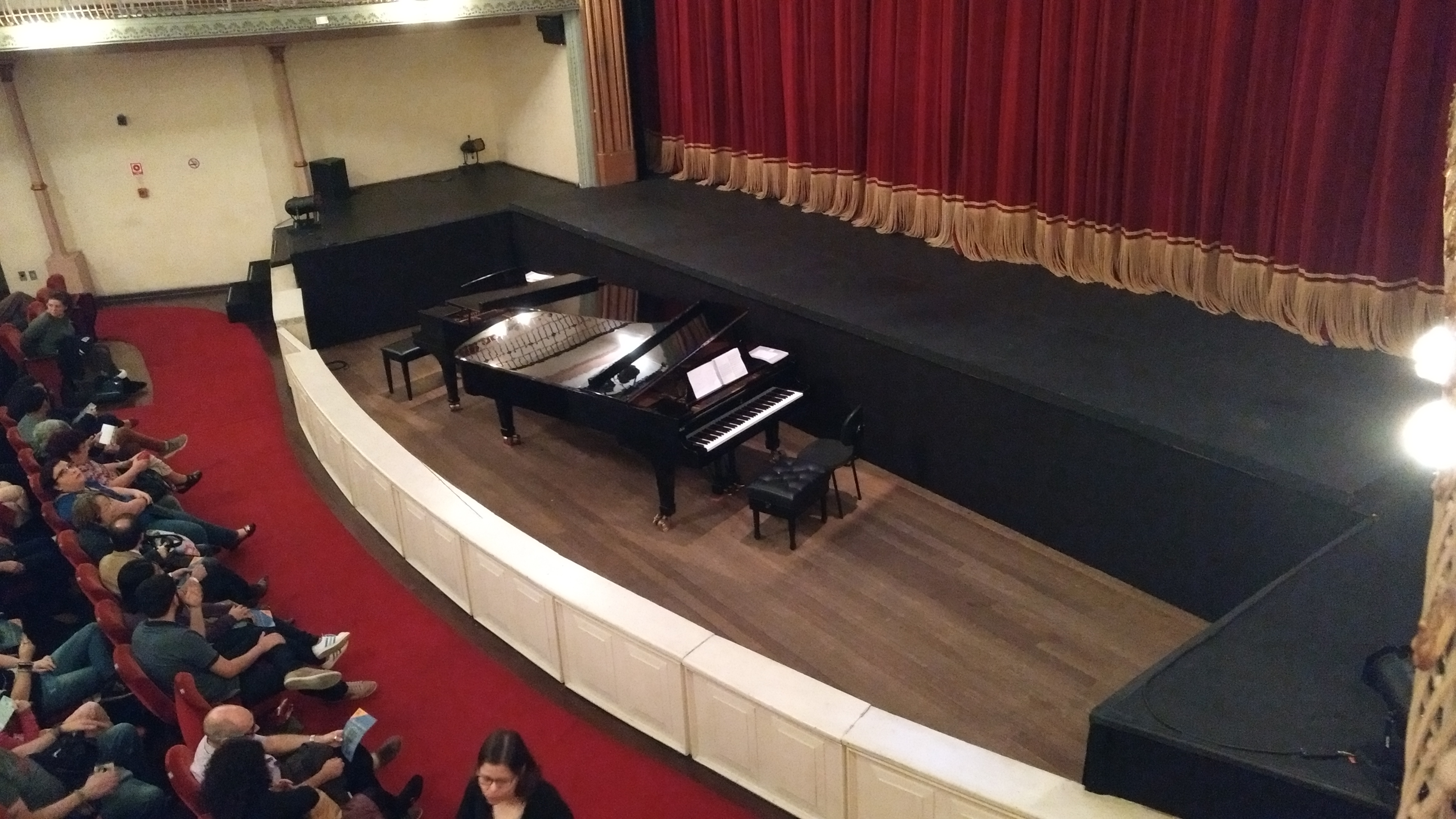
Inside the building.

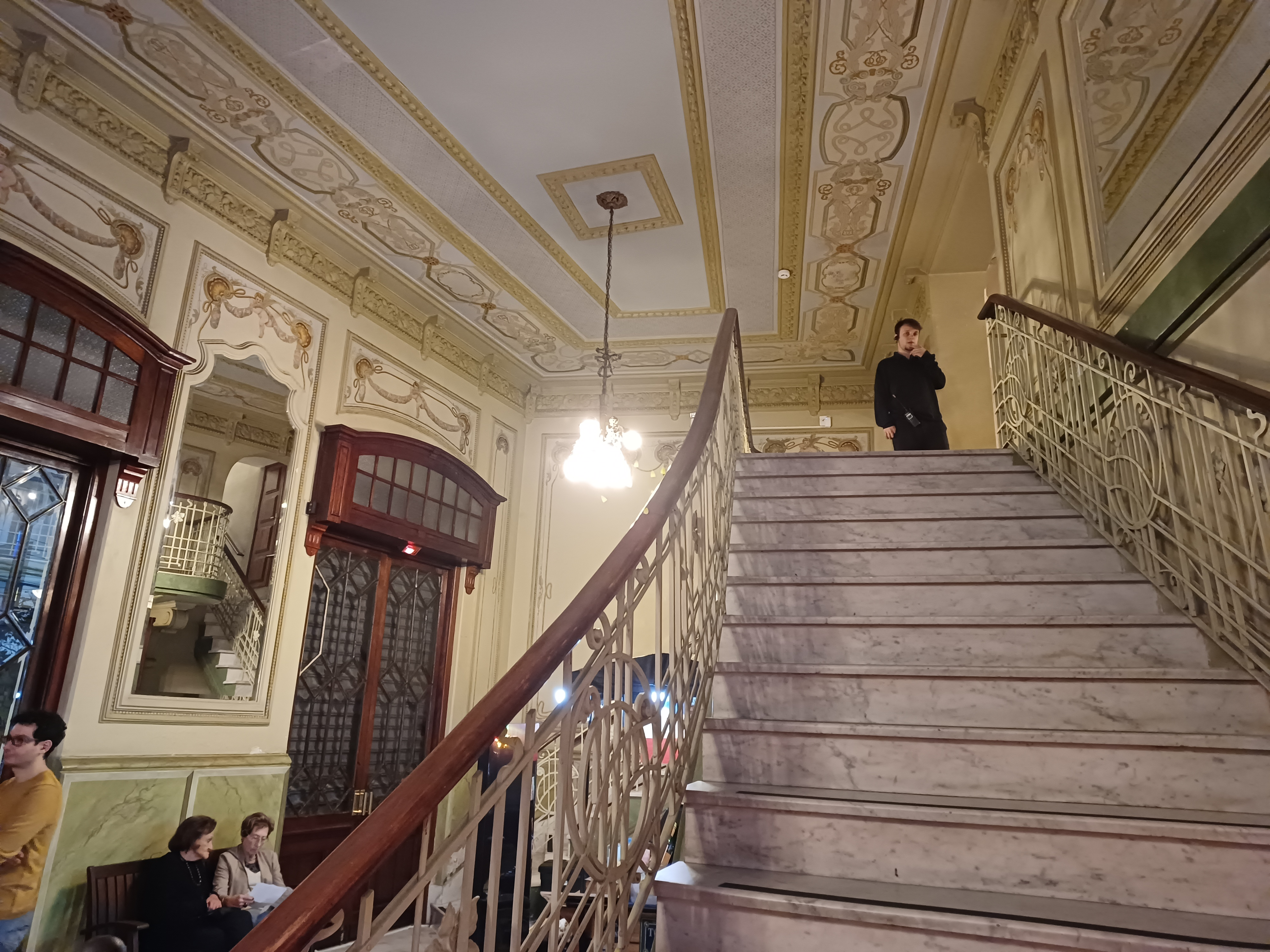
Building staircase.

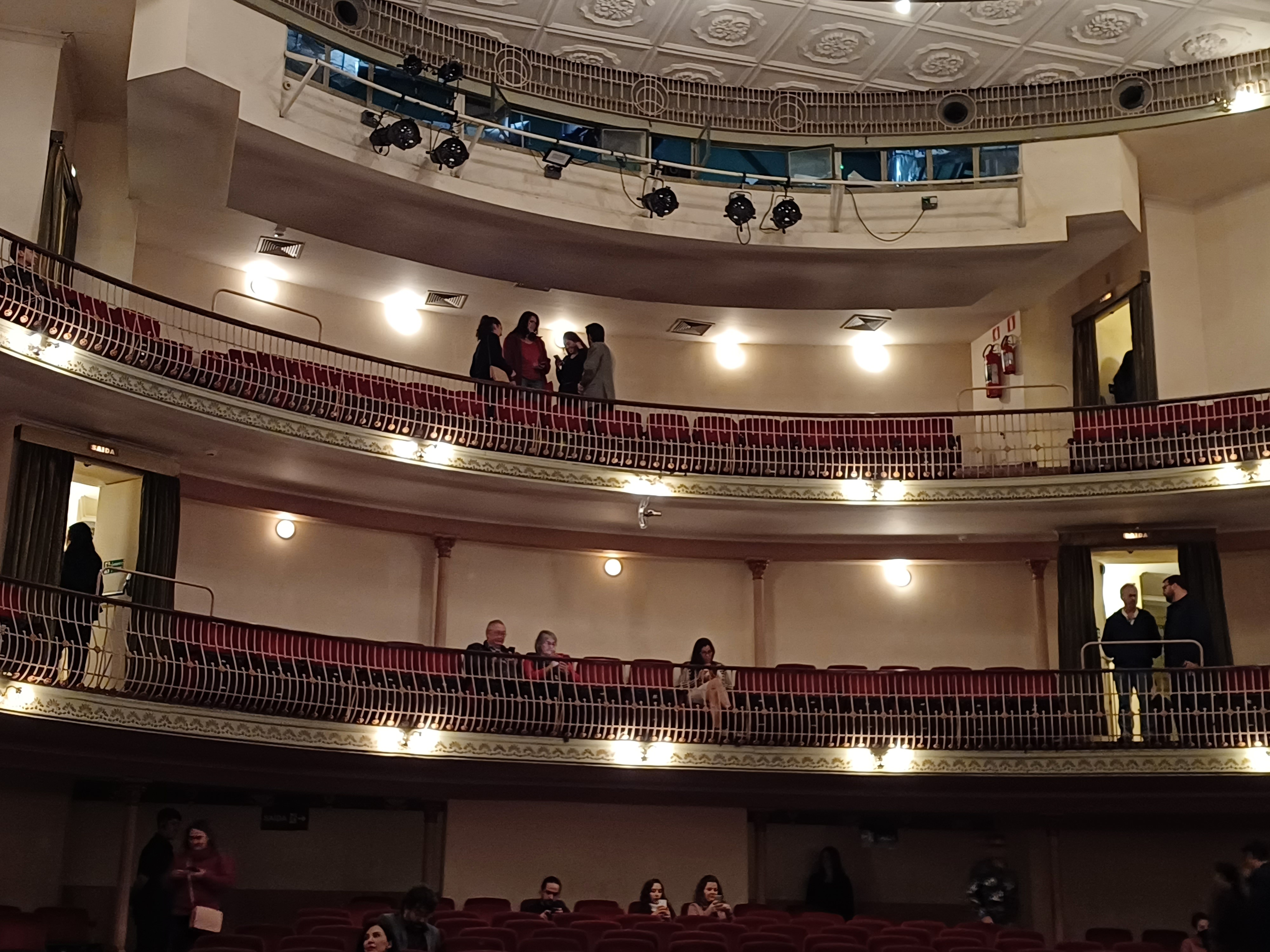
Inside the building.

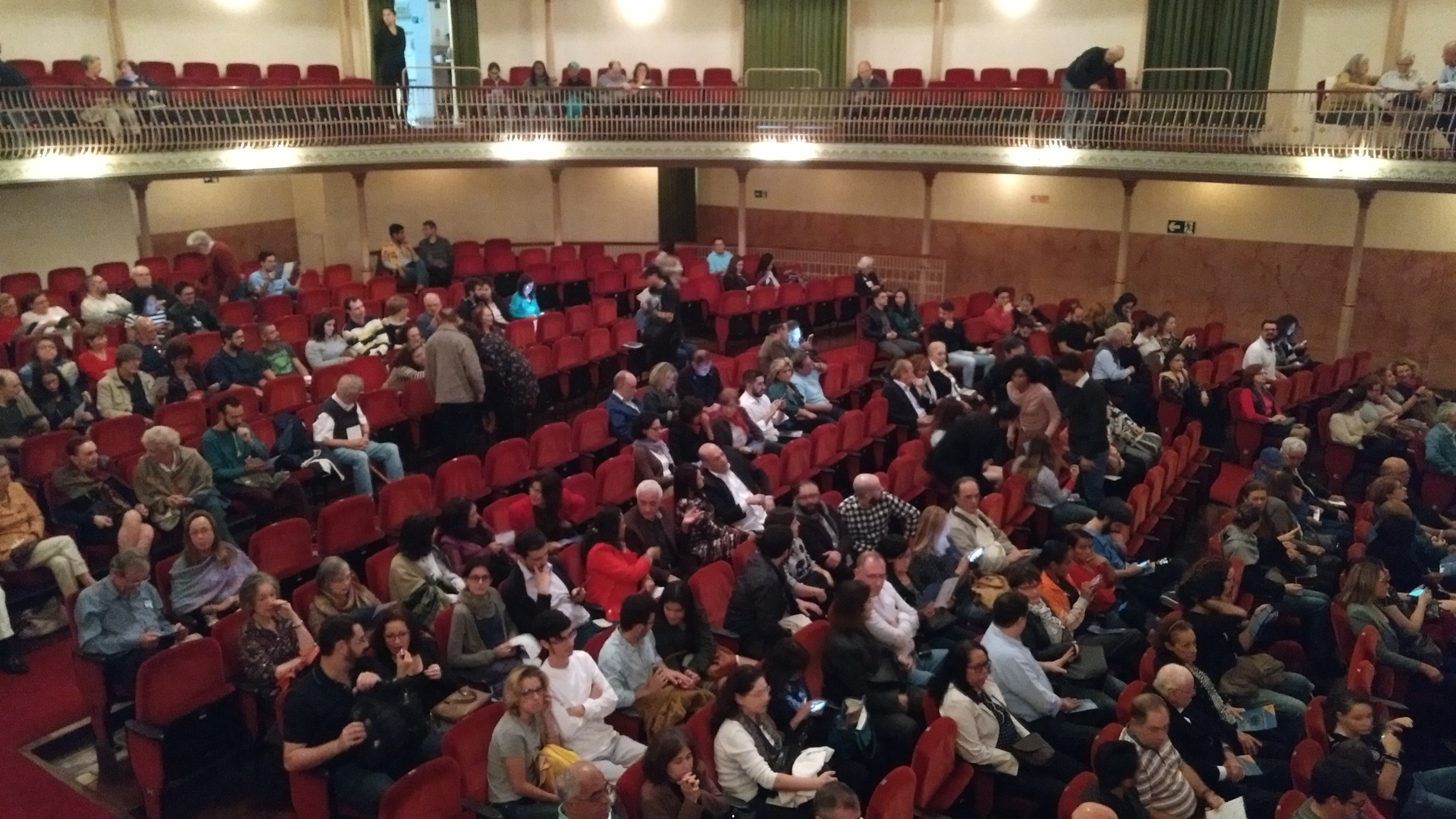
Theater auditorium.

== See also ==
- São José Theater
- Municipal Theatre of São Paulo
- Central Zone of São Paulo
- Tourism in the city of São Paulo
