= Théâtre de Caen =

Theatre and opera house in Caen, France

Coordinates: 49.1802°N 0.3624°W

Théâtre de Caen, 135 bd du Maréchal Leclerc, is the principle theatre and opera house of Caen, opened in 1963.

== The old theatre ==
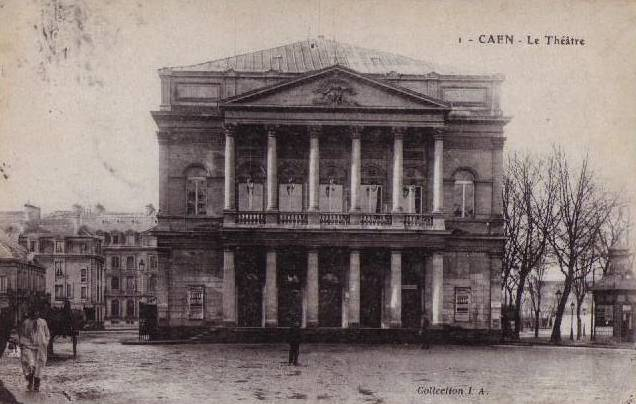
The old theatre, destroyed in 1944

The original théâtre de Caen, was built in 1765 by Alexandre Brongniart, on the Rue de l'Ancienne-Comédie.

A new theater was built on the bank of the Noë in 1838. This building was destroyed in 1944 during World War II. The current building is inaugurated in 1963.
