= Berlin Radio Choir =

Berlin based choir

Rundfunkchor Berlin
- Choir
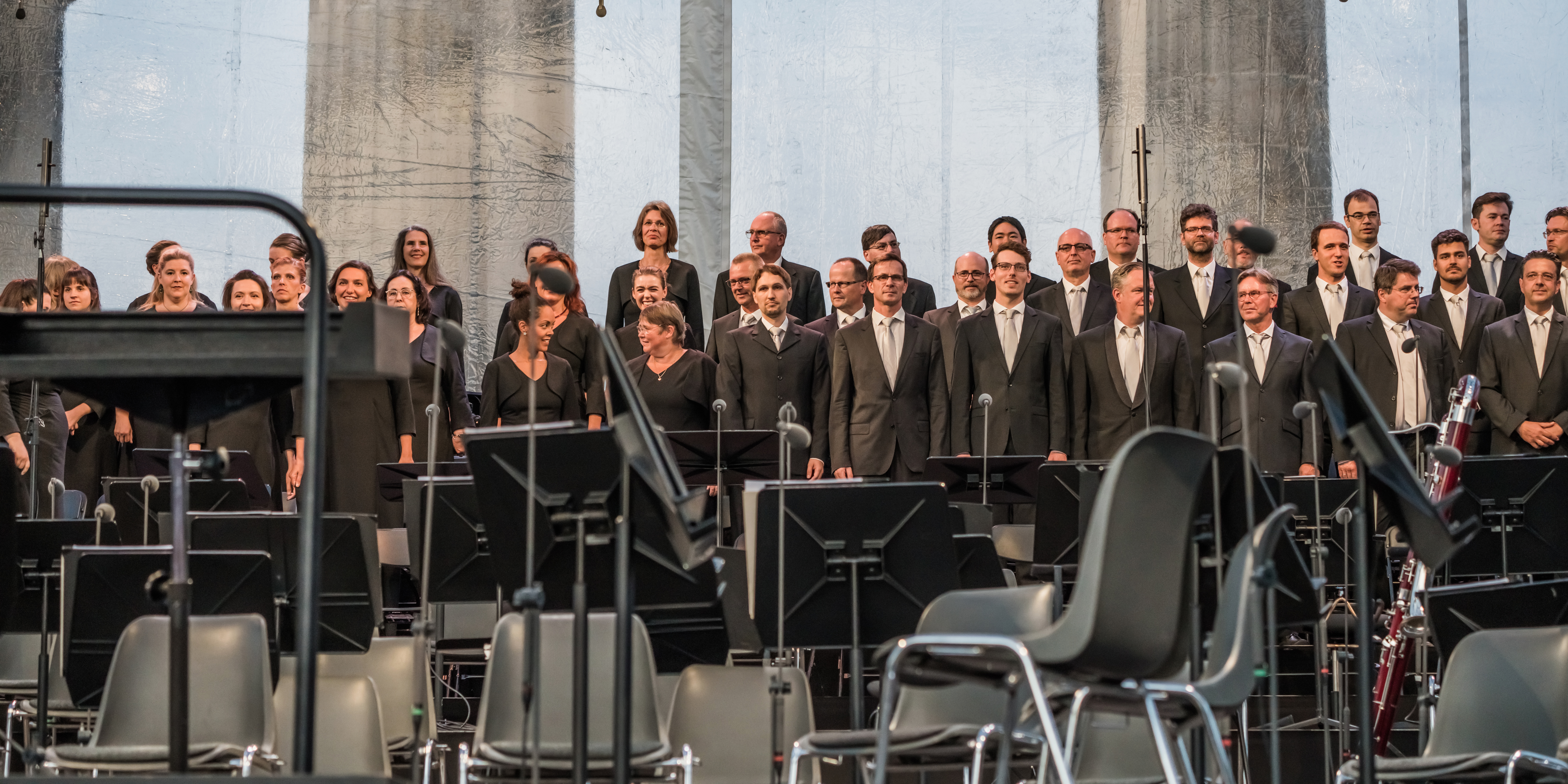
- Origin: Berlin, Germany
- Founded: 1925
- Genre: Professional mixed choir
- Chief conductor: Gijs Leenaars
- Website: rundfunkchor-berlin.de

The Rundfunkchor Berlin (Berlin Radio Choir) is a professional German classical choir founded in 1925.

In the 1950s the choir was divided into the Berliner Solistenvereinigung and the Großer Chor des Berliner Rundfunks. These were united as Rundfunkchor Berlin in 1973.

The choir is one of four professional bodies administered by Rundfunk-Orchester und -Chöre Berlin, founded in 1994 and jointly owned by Deutschlandradio (40%), Bundesrepublik Deutschland (35%), Land Berlin (20%) and Rundfunk Berlin-Brandenburg: Rundfunk-Sinfonieorchester Berlin (RSB) founded 1925 and continuing in East Berlin; Deutsches Symphonie-Orchester Berlin, founded 1946 in West Berlin as the RIAS-Symphonie-Orchester (RSO); the Rundfunkchor Berlin; and the RIAS Kammerchor founded 1948 in West Berlin.

For Pentatone, the choir has recorded ten operas of Richard Wagner, the Mass in F minor by Anton Bruckner and Die Tageszeiten by Richard Strauss.
