= Detlef Roth =

German bass-baritone

Detlef Roth (born 1969) is a German operatic bass-baritone.

== Life and career ==
Born in Freudenstadt, Roth studied singing with Georg Jelden at the State University of Music and Performing Arts Stuttgart. During his studies he won the Bundeswettbewerb Gesang Berlin in 1990, the International Hans Gabor Belvedere Singing Competition in Vienna in 1992 and the International Singing Competition for Wagner Voices in Strasbourg in 1994.

His opera repertoire includes works by Richard Wagner such as Wolfram von Eschenbach in Tannhäuser, Der Heerufer des Königs in Lohengrin, Donner in Das Rheingold, Amfortas in Parsifal and Gunther in Götterdämmerung. Other vocal parts are Papageno in Die Zauberflöte by Mozart, Count Almaviva in Le Nozze di Figaro by Mozart and roles in Hans Heiling by Heinrich Marschner, Die Bassariden by Hans Werner Henze and Königskinder by Engelbert Humperdinck.

His repertoire as a concert singer includes Elias by Felix Mendelssohn, A German Requiem by Johannes Brahms, among others, Carmina Burana by Carl Orff, Passions, masses and oratorios by Johann Sebastian Bach and Lieder by Franz Schubert.

Roth sang at the Milanese la Scala, the Royal Opera House in London, the Lincoln Center in New York and the Paris Opera and performed at the Bayreuth Festival, the Salzburg Festival and the Salzburg Easter Festival. Well-known orchestras with which he has sung include the Orchestra dell'Accademia Nazionale di Santa Cecilia, the Vienna Philharmonic, the Concertgebouw in Amsterdam and the Orchestre philharmonique de Strasbourg. With the French soprano Sandrine Piau and the Orchestre Philharmonique de Radio France he performed Mozart's love arias at the Cité de la musique in Paris.

== Collaboration on CD releases ==
- Symphonie Nr. 9 in D minor op. 125 by Ludwig van Beethoven, BMG Ariola, Hamburg 1999 (Bass)
- Doktor Faust by Ferruccio Busoni, East West Records, Hamburg 1999
- Konzert für Klavier und Orchester a-Moll op. 7 by Clara Schumann, Frankfurter Museums-Gesellschaft, Frankfurt 2001 (bass)
- A German Requiem by Johannes Brahms, Cappella, Wiesbaden 2001
- Königskinder by Engelbert Humperdinck, Universal Music Entertainment, Berlin 2006
- Sinfonien 1–9 by Ludwig van Beethoven, Bertelsmann, Gütersloh 2007 (bass)
- Die erste Walpurgisnacht by Felix Mendelssohn Bartholdy, Farao, Munich 2010
- Deutsche Volkslieder, part 1: Wenn ich ein Vöglein wär. Sony Music Entertainment, Munich 2010
- St John Passion by Johann Sebastian Bach (BWV 245), Förderkreis Thomanerchor, Leipzig 2011 (bass)
- Regina by Albert Lortzing, Cpo, Georgsmarienhütte 2013
