= Clémentine Margaine =

French opera singer (born 1984)

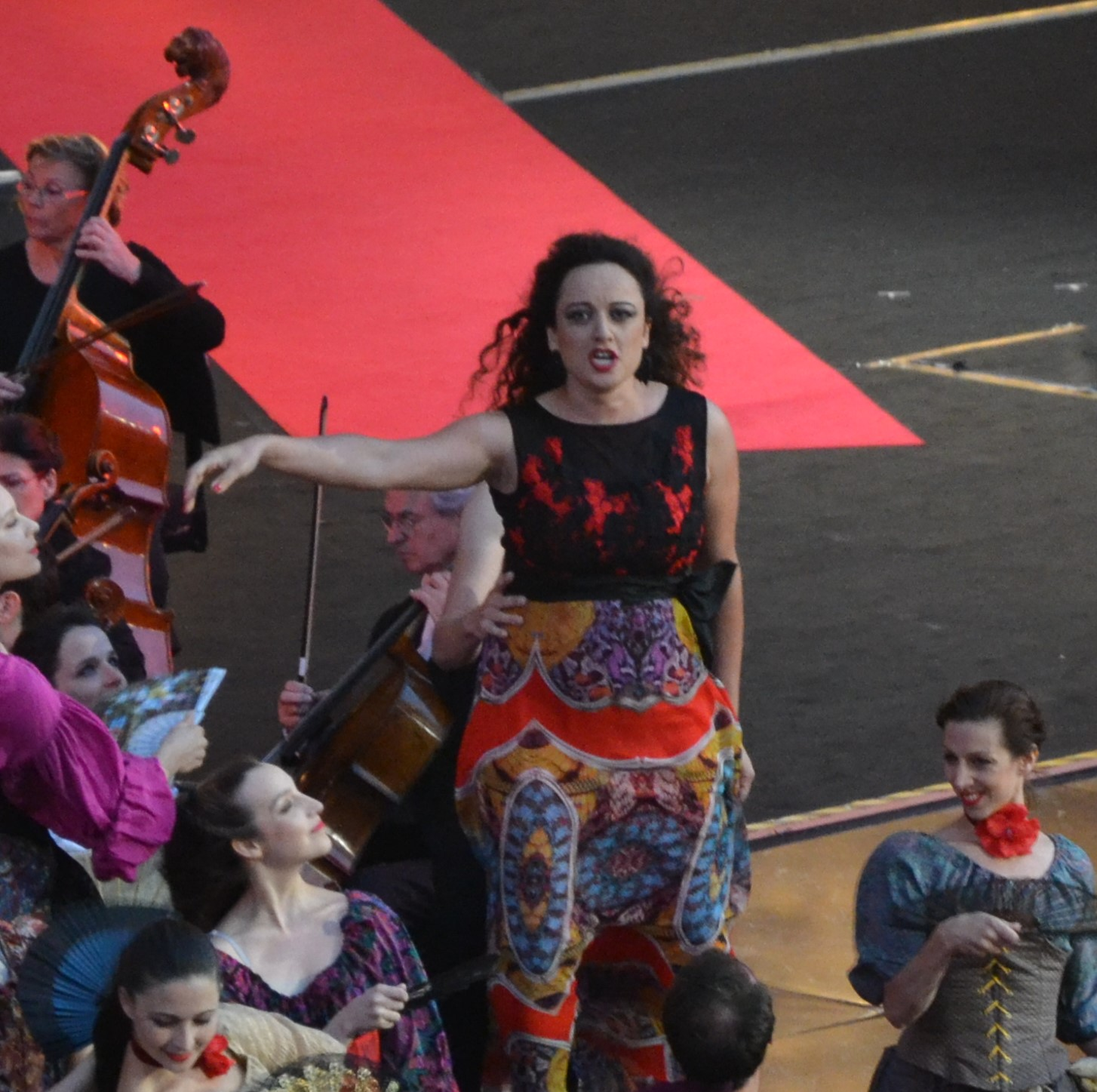
Margaine performing an excerpt from Carmen, Chorégies d'Orange, 2015

Clémentine Margaine (born 1984 in Narbonne), is a French operatic mezzo-soprano who enjoys an international career and has sung roles from baroque opera to Italian and French romantic leading roles.

== Life and career ==
Margaine's parents were music lovers who got her to learn piano; she also sang solos with the local children's choir. She went on to study law at the university of Montpellier, but was complimented on her voice to an extent that she contacted a singing teacher in Paris who advised her to stop her studies and enter the Paris Conservatoire, where she trained for six years, mainly in the recital repertoire. She won the Special Jury Prize of the Concours International de Chant de Marmande and in 2009 was voted the Révélation Classique in France's annual Victoires de la musique classique awards.

She sang Ascalax in Telemann's Die wunderbare Beständigkeit der Liebe (The Wonderful Constancy of Love) at the 20th Telemann Festival in Magdeburg in February 2010, conducted by David Stern. The following year she appeared at the Bachfest Leipzig as Tamasse in J. C. Bach's Zanaida and "coped magnificently, especially in the most famous aria", the opera again conducted by Stern with his Opera Fuoco forces. In July 2012 she sang in the first performance in modern times of the 1757 version of Rameau's Hippolyte et Aricie, conducted by Raphaël Pichon, where "the powerful conviction of Clémentine Margaine's Phèdre [that] rightly took centre stage. By turns imperious and searing, Margaine's characterization of one of the great tragic figures of opera was nothing less than a triumph". The following year at Beaune she sang the title role in Orfeo ed Euridice; another Rameau opera for her was Castor et Pollux, in which she recorded Phébé, again conducted by Pichon, on Harmonia Mundi.

However Margaine was dissatisfied with the roles she was being put forward for, and went for an audition for Christoph Seuferle, director of the Deutsche Oper Berlin, who proposed Third Lady in Die Zauberflöte, the Verdi Requiem and title role in Carmen. She then joined the Deutsche Oper, where in addition she sang Dalila in Samson et Dalila and Marguerite in La Damnation de Faust. She has sung the role of Carmen at a number of the world's leading opera houses including the Paris Opera, Opera Australia and the Metropolitan Opera, New York, in 2017, when she won praise for her "vast" range and "subtle art". In the bel canto repertoire she has sung Rebecca in Il templario at the 2016 Salzburg Festival, Adalgisa in Norma in Madrid, and Léonor in La favorite in Munich, Barcelona and at the Caramoor Summer Music Festival.

She appeared as Fidès in a new production of Meyerbeer's Le prophète at the Deutsche Oper in 2017; with the same company she recorded the title role in Hérodiade. Her Verdi roles have included Azucena in Il trovatore in Rome and London, Amneris in Aida in Sydney, Toronto and Barcelona, and Eboli in the Italian version of Don Carlos in Verona and Munich and in French in Chicago.
