= Christian Elsner =

German opera singer (born 1965)

- Born: 11 August 1965 (age 60); Freiburg im Breisgau, Germany
- Education: Musikhochschule Frankfurt
- Occupations: Operatic tenor; Academic teacher
- Organizations: Hochschule für Musik Würzburg; Hochschule für Musik Karlsruhe
- Website: www.christian-elsner.de

Christian Elsner (born 11 August 1965) is a German tenor in opera and concert, and an academic voice teacher at the Hochschule für Musik Karlsruhe. He focused first on lied and oratorio, then entered the opera stage in roles such as Handel's Tabarco and Mozart's Pedrillo. From 2007, he also performed roles such as Wagner's Siegmund and at international opera houses and festivals.

== Career ==
Born in Freiburg im Breisgau, Elsner was a member of the boys' choir and later the cathedral choir at the Freiburg Minster, where he received first singing lessons with the American opera tenor Richard Riffel. From 1987 he studied at the Musikhochschule Frankfurt (Frankfurt University of Music) with Martin Gründler, where he studied vocology. He also studied lieder with Charles Spencer and took supplementary master classes with Dietrich Fischer-Dieskau in Berlin and Neil Semer in New York.

He appeared as Tabarco in Handel's Armida at the Handel Festival, Halle, in 1994, and as Macduff in Verdi's Macbeth at the Heidelberg Theatre. He appeared as a guest at the Oper Frankfurt, the Staatstheater Mainz and Theater Bremen. He performed the role of Pedrillo in Mozart's Die Entführung aus dem Serail at the Staatstheater Darmstadt in the 1996–97 season. Also among his lyric roles were Lenski in Tchaikovsky's Eugene Onegin and the title role in Mozart's Idomeneo.

Since 2007, after a fach change towards Heldentenor roles, he appeared as Siegmund in Wagner's Die Walküre at the Staatstheater Darmstadt. A reviewer noted his lyrical belcanto singing based on lied technique, with many shades of the voice, precise diction, but also stable and present in the "Wälse" calls ("farbenreich, geschmeidig, textgenau und doch, wie in den "Wälse"-Rufen, stabil und präsent"). He also sang the role at the Semperoper in Dresden, and appeared in the title role of Wagner's Parsifal at the Vienna State Opera, the Deutsches Nationaltheater and Staatskapelle Weimar, and the Staatstheater Kassel.

As a concert soloist he sang in the Berliner Philharmonie, the Teatro alla Scala, Carnegie Hall in New York and the Suntory Hall in Tokyo. He has worked with conductors such as Marek Janowski, Mariss Jansons, Lorin Maazel, Yannick Nézet-Séguin, Simon Rattle and David Zinman. He gave lieder recitals with his regular accompanist Burkhard Kehring and also Hartmut Höll and Gerold Huber at the Laeiszhalle in Hamburg, at La Monnaie in Brussels, and at festivals such as the Beethovenfest in Bonn, the MDR Musiksommer and the Schubertiade in Feldkirch. He sang the tenor solo in Bruckner's Te Deum at the Salzburg Festival. In 2015, he performed the role of Johannes in Franz Schmidt's oratorio The Book with Seven Seals at the Vienna Musikverein, conducted by Manfred Honeck.

He was appointed professor of voice at the Hochschule für Musik Würzburg in 2006 and has held the position at the Hochschule für Musik Karlsruhe since 2017.

== Awards ==
- 1989 Scholarship of the International Association of Wagner Societies in Wiesbaden
- 1990 Franz-Völker Prize of Neu-Isenburg
- 1993 2nd prize of the Internationaler Walther Gruner-Wettbewerb in London
- 1994 2nd prize of the ARD International Music Competition in Munich

== Publications ==
- Lennie und die Zauberflöte. With illustrations by Beate Tamchina. Thiasos Musikverlag, Darmstadt 2002, ISBN 3-9805244-5-0 (Children's book after Mozart's Die Zauberflöte)
- Lennie in der Wolfsschlucht. With illustrations by Beate Tamchina. Thiasos Musikverlag, Darmstadt 2003, ISBN 3-9805244-7-7 (Children's book after Weber's Der Freischütz)
- Lennie und der Ring des Nibelungen. Books on Demand, Norderstedt 2009, ISBN 3-8370-3071-7 (Children's book after Wagner's Der Ring des Nibelungen)
