= Georg Zeppenfeld =

German opera singer

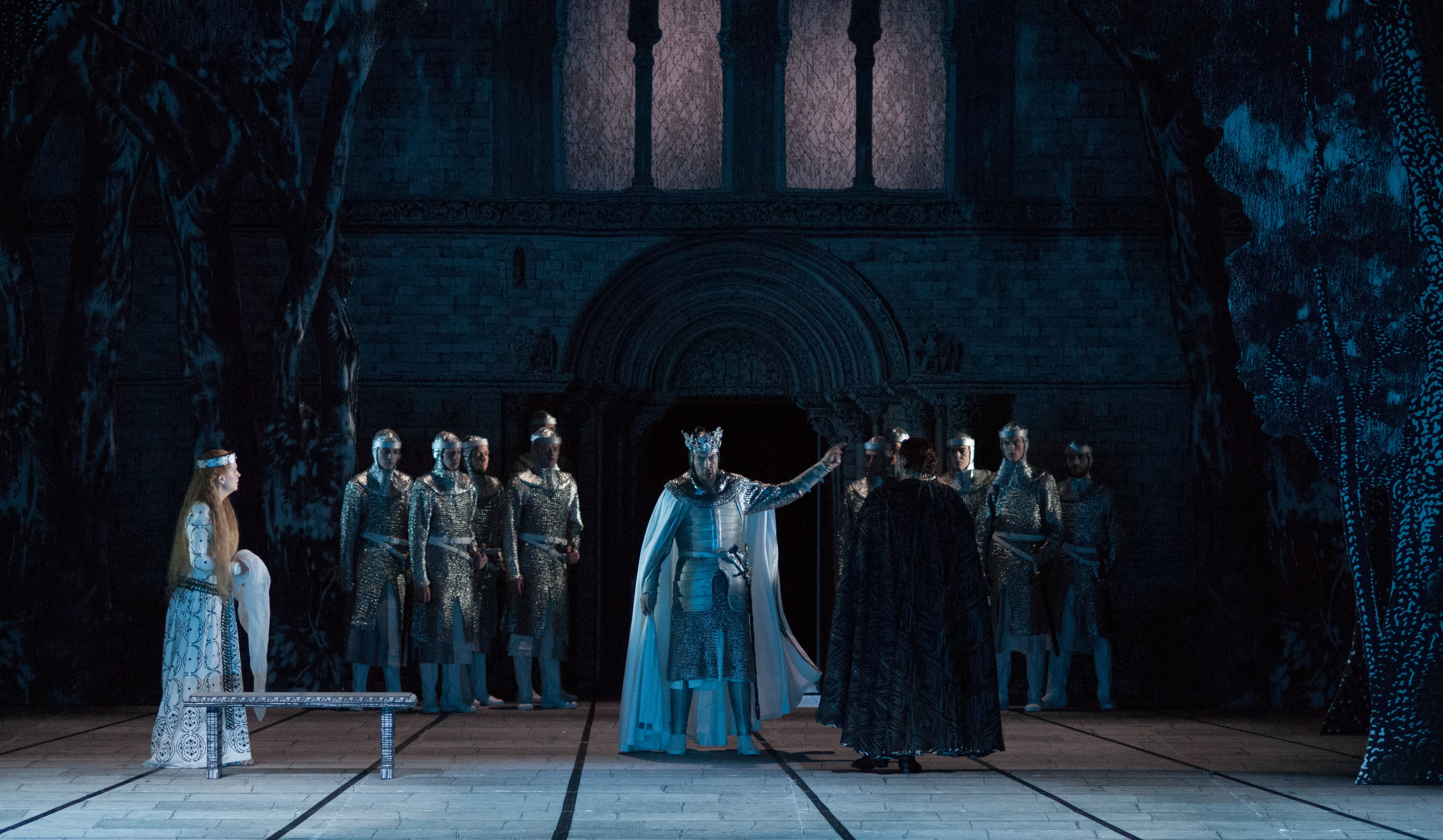
Fierrabras, Salzburg Festival 2014

Georg Zeppenfeld (born 1970) is a German operatic bass.

== Life ==
Born in Attendorn, Zeppenfeld studied first music and Germanistik at the Lehramt, then concert and opera singing at the music academies in Detmold and Köln, and then with Kammersänger Hans Sotin. About his voice training the singer said: "As a Westphalian one is not necessarily born for operatic singing. Where we speak, i.e. in the back of the throat, is not normally where one sings. It took a long time and a lot of patience from my voice teacher before I understood how to bring the voice forward."

Zeppenfeld was awarded the title Sächsischer Kammersänger (Staatsoper Dresden) in 2015.

== Discography ==
There are numerous recordings of Zeppenfeld's work, among them Verdi's Messa da Requiem, published live by Arte from the Dresden Semperoper and on DVD under the direction of Daniele Gatti on the 60th anniversary of the destruction of Dresden. CD recordings were made for Deutsche Grammophon, Deutsche Harmonia Mundi, Oehms Classics and others, radio and television productions with Westdeutscher, Mitteldeutscher, Norddeutscher and Bayerischer Rundfunk, Deutschlandfunk, ORF, 3sat, arte, R.T. Svizzera Italiana, Radio France among others.
