= Gerd Grochowski =

German opera singer

Gerd Grochowski (28 February 28, 1956 in Krefeld – 16 January 2017 in Mainz) was a German operatic bass-baritone who had an active international career from 1986 until his death in 2017. Particularly known for his performances in the operas of Richard Wagner, his roles included Donner in Das Rheingold, Gunther in Götterdämmerung, Klingsor in Parsifal, Kurwenal in Tristan und Isolde, Telramund in Lohengrin, and Wotan in The Ring Cycle. A graduate of the Hochschule für Musik und Tanz Köln, he was a longtime resident artist at the Cologne Opera. He appeared in leading roles as a guest artist at the Bayreuth Festival, the Berlin State Opera, the Bavarian State Opera, the Frankfurt Opera, the Hamburg State Opera, La Scala, the Liceu, the Linz State Theatre, the Stuttgart Opera, the Teatro Real, the Theater an der Wien, and the Salzburg Festival.
