= Clemens Bieber =

German operatic tenor (born 1956)

Clemens Bieber (born 26 January 1956) is a German operatic tenor.

== Life ==
Born in Würzburg, Bieber completed his vocal studies at the Hochschule für Musik in his hometown with Adalbert Kraus and Horst Laubenthal.

From 1986 to 1988, he was engaged as a lyrical tenor at the Saarländisches Staatstheater in Saarbrücken. Since 1988 he is engaged at the Deutsche Oper Berlin.

In the years 1987 to 1995 and from 2001, he sang as a soloist with the Bayreuth Festival.

In 2010, he was appointed Berlin Kammersänger.

Bieber also works as a concert singer. His repertoire includes the main works of Bach, Händel, Beethoven, Haydn, Mozart, Mendelssohn and Verdi. As a Bach interpreter he is the Evangelist in the passions and soloist in cantatas.
