= Michael McCown =

American operatic tenor

- Born: Abilene, Texas, U.S.
- Occupation: Operatic tenor
- Organizations: Oper Frankfurt
- Website: www.michaelmccown.com

Michael McCown is an American operatic tenor, based at the Oper Frankfurt. While many of the ninety roles in his repertoire are comprimario, he has portrayed lead roles such as Britten's Captain Vere, Abott and Tempter, and Nebukadnezar.

== Career ==
McCown was born in Abilene, Texas, the son of a pastor. He studied voice in Boston, and performed during his studies at the Aldeburgh Festival and at the Utah Opera.

McCown became a member of the Oper Frankfurt in 2001. He has a repertoire of more than 90 roles, appearing in Frankfurt as Normanno in Donizetti's Lucia di Lammermoor, the Shepherd in Wagner's Tristan und Isolde, Antonio in The Tempest by Thomas Adès, the Shepherd in Enescu's Œdipe, the Duke of Cornwall in Reimann's Lear and the Prior in Angels in America by Peter Eötvös. He also appeared as Don Alvar in Meyerbeer's L'Africaine, Fedotik Tri sestry by Eötvös. In 2016, he portrayed Captain Vere in Britten's Billy Budd and, according to a review, "conveyed all the conflicted forces preying on the character's mind". Roles in 2020 included the Second Jew in Salome staged by Barrie Kosky. In 2021 he first sang Leonard in a new production of Nielsen's Maskarade, Rouvel in Giordano's Fedora, and Tinca in Puccini's Il tabarro. He appeared in 2022 in new productions of Mozart's Die Zauberflöte as the First Armed Man, of Tchaikovsky's The Sorceress as Paisi, and of Puccini's Madama Butterfly as Yamadori. In 2023 he performed lead roles in a double bill of Britten's church parables at the Bockenheimer Depot, the double role of Abbot and Tempter in The Prodigal Son, and Nebuchadnezzar in The Burning Fiery Furnace. Axel Zibulski from the FAZ noted that McCown showed the "extreme lightness and luminous agility" ("extreme Leichtigkeit und leuchtende Wendigkeit") that characterised the voice of the composer's partner Peter Pears with whose voice in mind the music was written.

He performed as a guest in Der Rosenkavalier by Richard Strauss at the Hessisches Staatstheater Wiesbaden. He appeared as Walter von der Vogelweide in Wagner's Tannhäuser at the Aalto Theater in Essen, and as Scaramuccio in Ariadne auf Naxos by Richard Strauss at the Bavarian State Opera in Munich.
