= International Classical Music Awards =

Classical music awards

The International Classical Music Awards (ICMA) are music awards first awarded 6 April 2011. ICMA replace the Cannes Classical Awards (later called MIDEM Classical Awards) formerly awarded at MIDEM. The jury consists of music critics of magazines Andante (Turkey), Crescendo (Belgium), Das Orchester (Germany), Musica (Italy), Musik & Theater (Switzerland), Opera (United Kindgom), Papageno (Hungary), Pizzicato (Luxembourg), Tygodnik Powszechny (Poland), Rondo Classic (Finland), Scherzo (spain); radio stations Deutsche Welle (Germany), Gewandhaus Radio (Germany), radio klassik Stephansdom (Austria), Opus Raido (Luxembourg), Radio România Muzical (Romania); the organizations International Music and Media Centre (IMZ) (Austria) and Unison (Croatia); and the websites Kulmag (Liechtenstein) and Resmusica.com (France) .

The first award ceremony was held in Tampere, Finland on 6 April 2011. The 2012 award ceremony and gala concert took place in Nantes (15 May 2012, Orchestre National des Pays de la Loire). The 2013 award ceremony and gala concert were held in Milan (18 March 2013) and hosted by Orchestra Sinfonica di Milano Giuseppe Verdi. In 2014, the award ceremony and gala concert took place in Warsaw during the Beethoven Festival (with the Sinfonia Iuventus). The 2015 award ceremony and gala concert took place in Ankara with the Bilkent Symphony Orchestra (28 March 2015).

== Award ceremony hosts ==
- 2011 Tampere
- 2012 Nantes
- 2013 Milan
- 2014 Warsaw
- 2015 Ankara
- 2016 San Sebastián
- 2017 Leipzig
- 2018 Katowice
- 2019 Lucerne
- 2020 Seville
- 2021 Vaduz
- 2022 Luxembourg City
- 2023 Wrocław
- 2024 València
- 2025 Düsseldorf
- 2026 Bamberg

== 2011 ==
The Jury announced the winners for 2011 in 20 categories from a nomination list comprising over 500 CD and DVD productions.

=== 2011 special awards ===
- Lifetime Achievement Award: Menahem Pressler, founder of the Beaux Arts Trio
- Artist of the Year: Esa-Pekka Salonen
- Young Artist of the Year: David Kadouch (French pianist)
- Label of the Year: Chandos Records
- Special Achievement Award: BIS Records' complete Sibelius Edition
- Website/Online Award: Berlin Philharmonic Orchestra Digital Concert Hall

=== 2011 audio and video categories ===
- Recording of the Year + Opera category – Mozart Die Zauberflöte, Akademie für Alte Musik Berlin dir. René Jacobs (Harmonia Mundi HMC 90206870)
- Symphonic – Shostakovich 8th Symphony, Royal Liverpool Philharmonic Orchestra conducted by Vasily Petrenko (Naxos)
- Baroque – Via Crucis soloists Núria Rial, Philippe Jaroussky, L'Arpeggiata, cond. Christina Pluhar (Virgin Classics 5099969457708)
- Chamber Music – Beethoven Violin Sonatas Nos 3, 9 "Kreutzer" – Viktoria Mullova, Kristian Bezuidenhout (Onyx 4050)
- Choral – Stravinsky Oedipus Rex – Depardieu, Mariinsky Orchestra & Chorus, Gergiev (Mariinsky MAR0510)
- Concerto – Schumann Complete Works for Violin and Orchestra – Lena Neudauer, German Radio PO, Pablo González (Hänssler Classic CD 93 258)
- Contemporary – Friedrich Cerha Spiegel-Monumentum-Momente – SWR Symphony Orchestra Baden-Baden & Freiburg, Sylvain Cambreling (Kairos KAI0013002)
- Early Music – Dinastia Borgia Book and CDs – Montserrat Figueras, Hespèrion XXI, Jordi Savall (Alia Vox AVSA9875A+C)
- First Recording – Vivaldi Armida al campo d'Egitto Concerto Italiano, Rinaldo Alessandrini (Naïve OP30492)
- Historical – Sibelius Complete Symphonies – Moscow Radio Symphony Orchestra, Gennady Rozhdestvensky (Melodiya MELCD 1001669)
- Solo Instrumental – Debussy Complete Piano Works Vol 5 – Jean-Efflam Bavouzet (Chandos CHAN 10545)
- Vocal Recital – Mahler Lieder – Christian Gerhaher, Gerold Huber (RCA 886975677320)
- DVD Performance – Wagner Der Ring des Nibelungen – cond. Zubin Mehta, Orquestra de la Comunitat Valenciana with La Fura dels Baus (C Major 703 808)
- DVD Documentary – Tchaikovsky Two films: (Tchaikovsky's Women, Fate) – Christopher Nupen (Allegro Films A 10CN D)

== 2012 ==
The Jury announced the winners for 2012 in 20 categories from a nomination list comprising over 250 CD and DVD productions.

=== 2012 special awards ===
- Lifetime Achievement Award: Krzysztof Penderecki
- Artist of the Year: Jean-Efflam Bavouzet
- Young Artist of the Year: Joseph Moog (pianist)
- Label of the Year: Ondine
- Special Achievement Award: Ward Marston (restorer of historical recordings)
- Website/Online Award: classicalplanet.com

=== 2012 audio and video categories ===
- Recording of the Year + Solo instrumental category: Robert Schumann: Papillons, Klaviersonate op. 11, Kinderszenen, Fantasie op. 17, Waldszenen, Thema mit Variationen (Geistervariationen); Andras Schiff (ECM 2122/23)
- Symphonic: Gustav Mahler: Symphony No. 4; Sunhae Im, Pittsburgh Symphony Orchestra, Manfred Honeck (Exton EXCL00048)
- Baroque instrumental: Rameau: L’Orchestre de Louis XV – Rameau: Les Indes galantes, Naïs, Zoroastre, Les Boréades (Orchestral Suites); Le Concert des Nations, Jordi Savall (Alia Vox AVSA9882)
- Baroque vocal: Heinrich Schütz: Musicalische Exequien; Vox Luminis, Lionel Meunier (Ricercar RIC 311)
- Chamber Music: Ludwig van Beethoven: Septet op. 20, Sextet op. 71; Scharoun Ensemble Berlin (Tudor 7146)
- Choral: Gabriel Fauré: Requiem; Philippe Jaroussky, Matthias Goerne, Chœur de l'Orchestre de Paris, Orchestre de Paris, Paavo Järvi (Virgin 5099908847027)
- Concerto: French Impressions – Camille Saint-Saëns, Eugène Ysaÿe, Ernest Chausson, Maurice Ravel; Rachel Kolly d'Alba, Orchestre Symphonique de Bienne, Jean-Jacques Kantorow, Orchestre National des Pays de la Loire, John Axelrod (Warner Classics 2564671814)
- Contemporary: Krzysztof Penderecki: Viola Concerto, Cello Concerto No. 2; Grigory Zhislin, Tatjana Vassiljeva, Warsaw Philharmonic Orchestra, Antoni Wit (Naxos 8.572 211)
- Early Music; Palestrina Vol. 1 – Giovanni Pierluigi da Palestrina: Missa Assumpta est Maria, Salve Regina, Ave Maria; The Sixteen, Harry Christophers (Coro COR16091)
- Opera: Frank Martin – Der Sturm; Robert Holl, Christine Buffle, Ethan Herschenfeld, James Gilchrist, Netherlands Radio Philharmonic Orchestra and Netherlands Radio Choir, conducted Thierry Fischer (Hyperion CDA678213)
- Historical: Béla Bartók: Concertos, Cantata profana, Divertimento, etc.; Tibor Varga, Andor Foldes, Géza Anda, Louis Kentner, Dietrich Fischer-Dieskau, RIAS Berlin, conducted Ferenc Fricsay (Audite 21 407)
- Vocal Recital: Tragédiennes 3 – Etienne Nicolas Méhul, Rodolphe Kreutzer, Antonio Salieri, Christoph Willibald Gluck, François Joseph Gossec, Hector Berlioz, etc.; Véronique Gens, Les Talens Lyriques, Christophe Rousset. (Virgin 50999 070927 2 5)
- Vocal Recital: Slavic Opera Arias – Piotr Ilyich Tchaikovsky, Parashkev Hadjiev, Alexander Borodin, Antonín Dvořák, Bedřich Smetana, Nicolai Rimsky-Korsakov; Veselin Stoyanov, Krassimira Stoyanova, Münchner Rundfunkorchester, Pavel Baleff (Orfeo C 830 111 A)
- DVD Performance: Gustav Mahler: Symphony No. 9; Lucerne Festival Orchestra, Claudio Abbado (Accentus Music ACC 20214)
- DVD Documentary: Carlos Kleiber – Traces to Nowhere; Film by Eric Schulz. With Plácido Domingo, Brigitte Fassbaender, Otto Schenk, Veronika Kleiber (Arthaus Musik 101553)

== 2013 ==
=== 2013 special awards ===
- Lifetime achievement award: Aldo Ciccolini
- Artist of the year: Carolin Widmann
- Young artist of the year vocal: Valer Sabadus
- Young artist of the year instrumental: Alessandro Mazzamuto (pianist)
- label of the year: Audite
- Classical website award: Philharmonia Orchestra
- Special achievement award: Robert von Bahr (BIS Records)
- Special achievement award: Orchestra Sinfonica di Milano Giuseppe Verdi (Orchestra LaVerdi)

=== 2013 audio and video categories ===
- Early music: Amarcord – zu S. Thomas, Zwei Gregorianische Messen aus dem Thomas-Graduale – Thomaskirche Leipzig, um 1300; Amarcord Ensemble (RKap 10112)
- Baroque instrumental: Johann Sebastian Bach: Sonatas & Partitas BWV 1001–3 (Vol. II); Isabelle Faust, violin (Harmonia Mundi HMC 902124)
- Baroque vocal: Polychoral Splendour Music from the four galleries of the Abbey Church of Muri by Giovanni Gabrieli and Heinrich Schütz Cappella Murensis; (Siri Karoline Thornhill, Stephanie Petitlaurent, Rolf Ehlers, Jürgen Ochs, Mirko Ludwig, Manuel Warwitz, Simon Schnorr, Kees Jan De Koning, Les Cornets Noirs, Johannes Strobl (Audite 92.652)
- Vocal recital: Christian Gerhaher – Ferne Geliebte, Beethoven – Haydn – Schönberg – Berg; Christian Gerhaher, baritone, Gerold Huber, piano (Sony Classical 88691935432)
- Choral works: Felix Mendelssohn Bartholdy – Geistliches Chorwerk; Kammerchor Stuttgart, Frieder Bernius (Carus 83020)
- Opera: Stanislaw Moniuszko: Verbum nobile; Aleksander Teliga, Aleksandra Buczek, Leszek Skrla, Michal Partyka, Janusz Lewandowski, Chor i Orkiestra Opery na Zamku / Warcislaw Kunc (Dux 783)
- Solo instrument: Serge Rachmaninov: Piano Sonata No. 1 in D minor, Op. 28, Piano Sonata No. 2 in B flat minor, Op. 36; Nikolai Lugansky, piano (Naïve AM208)
- Chamber music: Olivier Messiaen: Quatuor pour la fin du temps; Carolin Widmann, violin, Jörg Widmann, clarinet, Nicolas Altstaedt, cello, Alexander Lonquich, piano (Orfeo C 840121 B)
- Concertos: Dances to a Black Pipe, Copland – Brahms – Fröst – Piazzolla – Hillborg – Högberg; Martin Fröst, Australian Chamber Orchestra, Richard Tognetti (BIS SACD 1863)
- Symphonic music: Albert Roussel: Le festin de l’araignée (The Spider’s Banquet), Padmâvatî; Royal Scottish National Orchestra, Stéphane Denève (Naxos 8.572243)
- Contemporary music: Einojuhani Rautavaara: Cello Concerto No. 2 Towards the Horizon, Modificata, Percussion Concerto Incantations; Truls Mørk, cello, Colin Currie, percussion, Helsinki Philharmonic Orchestra, John Storgårds (Ondine ODE11782)
- Best collection: Anton Bruckner: Symphonies No. 1 – 9; Gewandhausorchester Leipzig, Herbert Blomstedt (Querstand VKJK 1230)
- Historical recording: Les Ballets Russes, Igor Stravinsky: The Firebird, Petrushka, The Rite of Spring; Moscow Philharmonic, Moscow State Conservatory Symphony Orchestra, Radio and Television Symphony Orchestra, Dmitri Kitayenko, Pierre Boulez, Vladimir Fedoseyev (Melodiya 1001990)
- DVD performance: Francesco Cilea: Adriana Lecouvreur; Angela Gheorghiu, Jonas Kaufmann, Olga Borodina, Alessandro Corbelli, David Soar, Iain Paton, Janis Kelly, Sarah Castle, Maurizio Muraro, Bonaventura Bottone, Chorus and Orchestra of the Royal Opera House, Covent Garden, Sir Mark Elder (conductor) and David McVicar (stage director) (Decca 0743459)
- DVD documentaries: John Cage – Journeys in Sound. A Film by Allan Miller & Paul Smaczny, and written by Anne-Kathrin Peitz (Accentus ACC 20246)

== 2014 ==
=== 2014 special awards ===
- Lifetime achievement award: Charles Dutoit
- Artist of the year: Andreas Staier
- Young artist of the year: Adrien Boisseau
- Label of the year: Glossa
- Classical website award: Metropolitan Opera Archives
- Special achievement award: Ludwig van Beethoven Association, Kraków (Poland)
- Special achievement award: SWR Symphony Orchestra Baden-Baden and Freiburg

=== 2014 audio and video categories ===
- Early music: Erasmus van Rotterdam: In Praise of Folly; Louise Moaty, Marc Mauillon, René Zosso, La Capella Reial de Catalunya, Hesperion XXI, Jordi Savall
- Baroque instrumental: The Scarlatti Restored Manuscript, Domenico Scarlatti, Antonio Soler: Sonatas; Andrea Bacchetti, piano, RCA Red Seal
- Baroque vocal: Giovanni Battista Pergolesi: Stabat Mater, Laudate Pueri, Confitebor tibi Domine; Philippe Jaroussky, Julia Lezhneva, Coro della Radiotelevisione della Svizzera Italiana, I Barocchisti, Diego Fasolis (Erato)
- Vocal recital: Franz Schubert: Erlkönig; Matthias Goerne, baritone & Andreas Haefliger, piano (Harmonia Mundi)
- Choral works: Berlioz: Grande messe des morts, Op. 5; Barry Banks, London Symphony Chorus, London Philharmonic Choir, London Symphony Orchestra, Sir Colin Davis, LSO Live
- Opera: Benjamin Britten: The Rape of Lucretia; Ian Bostridge, Angelika Kirchschlager, Christopher Purves, Susan Gritton, Peter Coleman-Wright, Claire Booth, Aldeburgh Festival Ensemble, Oliver Knussen (Erato)
- Solo instrument: Maurice Ravel: Valses nobles et sentimentales – George Enescu: Sonata op. 24/1 – Claude Debussy: 4 Préludes, Elisabeth Leonskaja, piano (eaSonus) & Scarlatti Illuminated (Scarlatti – Scarlatti/Tausig – Scarlatti/Friedman); Joseph Moog, piano (Onyx)
- Chamber music: Béla Bartok: String Quartet No. 3 – Alban Berg: String Quartet op. 3 – Alfred Schnittke: String Quartet No. 3; Signum Quartet (Capriccio)
- Concertos Béla Bartók: Violin Concerto No. 2, Sz 112 – Peter Eötvös: Seven – György Ligeti: Violin Concerto; Patricia Kopatchinskaja, Frankfurt Radio Symphony, Ensemble Modern, Peter Eötvös (Naïve)
- Symphonic music: Johannes Brahms: Symphonies Nos. 1–4, Tragische Ouvertüre, Haydn-Variationen, Liebeslieder-Walzer etc.; Gewandhausorchester Leipzig, Riccardo Chailly (Decca)
- Contemporary music: Krzysztof Penderecki: The Complete Symphonies; Polish Sinfonia Iuventus Orchestra, Krzysztof Penderecki (Dux 947)
- Best collection: Paul Hindemith: Violin Concerto – Violin Sonatas; Frank Peter Zimmermann, violin, Enrico Pace, piano, Paavo Järvi, Frankfurt Radio Symphony (BIS)
- Historical recording: Sergiu Celibidache – The Berlin Recordings, 1945–1957; Hans Bottermund, Helmut Heller, Lilia d’Albore, Erna Berger, Margarete Klose, Gustav Scheck, Gerhard Puchelt, Tibor de Machula, Raoul Koczalski, Hans Peter Schmitz, Helmut Schlövogt, Karl Rucht, Berliner Philharmoniker, Rundfunk-Sinfonieorchester Berlin, Radio-Symphonie-Orchester Berlin, Sergiu Celibidache (Audite)
- DVD performance: Sergey Prokofiev: The Gambler; Sergei Aleksashkin, Tatiana Pavlovskaya, Vladimir Galuzin, Larissa Dyadkova, Nikolai Gassiev, Alexander Gergalov, Nadezhda Serdyuk, Andrei Popov, Oleg Sychev, Andrei Spekhov, Mariinsky Orchestra, Valery Gergiev; Laurent Gentot, film director (Mariinsky)
- DVD documentaries: Refuge in Music – Terezin; A Film by Dorothee Binding and Benedict Mirow, with Anne-Sofie von Otter, Daniel Hope, Christian Gerhaher, Bengt Forsberg, Bebe Risenfors, Alice Herz-Sommer, Coco Schumann (Deutsche Grammophon)

== 2015 ==
=== 2015 special awards ===
- Lifetime Achievement Award: Dmitri Kitayenko
- Artist of the Year: Christian Tetzlaff
- Young artist of the Year vocal: Jodie Devos
- Young artist of the Year instrumental: Yury Revich
- Label of the Year: Accentus
- Special Achievement Award: Panufnik Edition: Lukasz Dlugosz, Ewa Kupiec, Alexander Sitkovetsky, Sarah van der Kemp, Michael von Schönermark, Raphael Wallfisch, Polish Radio Symphony Orchestra, Konzerthausorchester Berlin, Lukasz Borowicz (cpo).
- Special Achievement Award: Zhu Xiao-Mei, piano. Johann Sebastian Bach: The Art of Fugue (Accentus CD: ACC30308); Goldberg Variations (Accentus DVD: ACC20313)
- Special Achievement Award: Bilkent Symphony Orchestra

=== 2015 audio and video categories ===
- Early music: Bal-Kan. Honey and Blood, Cycles of Life; Meral Azizoğlu, Irini Derebei, Gürsoy Dinçer, Lior Elmaleh, Montserrat Figueras, Tcha Limberger, Marc Mauillon, Amira Medunjanin, Stoimenka Outchikova-Nedyalkova, Agi Szalóki, Zacharias Spyridakis, Hesperion XXI, Jordi Savall (Alia Vox AVSA 9902)
- Baroque instrumental: Pavanes and Fantasies from the Age of Dowland; Dowland – Purcell – Jenkins – Lawes – Morley – Locke; John Holloway, Monika Baer, Renate Steinmann, Susanna Hefti, Martin Zeller (ECM 4810430)
- Baroque vocal: Vivaldi: Pieta – Sacred Works for Alto; Philippe Jaroussky, Ensemble Arteserse (Erato 825646258109)
- Vocal recital: Stella di Napoli; Pacini – Bellini – Carafa – Rossini – Mercadante – Donizetti...; Joyce DiDonato, Orchestre de l’

Opéra national de Lyon, Riccardo Minasi (Erato 2564636562)

- Choral works: Beethoven: Missa Solemnis; Lucy Crowe, Jennifer Johnston, James Gilchrist, Matthew Rose, Monteverdi Choir, Orchestre Révolutionnaire et Romantique, Sir John Eliot Gardiner (Soli Deo Gloria SDG 718)
- Opera: Leonard Bernstein: West Side Story; Alexandra Silber, Cheyenne Jackson, Jessica Vosk, Kevin Vortmann, Juliana Hansen, Kelly Markgraf, Julia Bullock, San Francisco Symphony Chorus & Orchestra, Michael Tilson Thomas (SFS Media 821936-0059-2)
- Solo instrument: Franz Schubert: Sonatas D. 894 & D. 959; Evgeni Koroliov, piano (Tacet 979)
- Chamber music: Ludwig van Beethoven: Streichtrio op. 3 – Serenade op. 8; Frank Peter Zimmermann, Antoine Tamestit, Christian Poltéra (BIS 2087)
- Concertos: Joseph Haydn: Sinfonia Concertante; Wolfgang A. Mozart: Oboe Concerto; Lucas M. Navarro, Gregory Ahss, Konstantin Pfiz, Guilhaume Santana, Orchestra Mozart, Claudio Abbado (Claves 1302)
- Symphonic music: Anton Bruckner: Symphony No. 9; Lucerne Festival Orchestra, Claudio Abbado (Deutsche Grammophon 4793441)
- Contemporary music: Unsuk Chin: Piano and Cello Concertos, Su for Sheng and Orchestra; Alban Gerhardt, Wu Wei, Sunwook Kim, Seoul Philharmonic, Myung-Whun Chung (Deutsche Grammophon 481 0971)
- Best collection: Wolfgang Amadeus Mozart: Complete Symphonies; Danish National Chamber Orchestra, Ádám Fischer (Dacapo 8201201)
- Historical recording: Vaughan Williams: Symphonies Nos. 1–9; USSR Ministry of Culture Symphony Orchestra, Gennady Rozhdestvensky (Melodiya MELCD 1002170)
- DVD performance: Nikolaï Rimsky-Korsakov: The Legend of the Invisible City of Kitezh; Vladimir Vaneev, Maxim Aksenov, Svetlana Ignatovich, John Daszak, Alexey Markov, Netherlands Opera Chorus, Netherlands Philharmonic Orchestra, Marc Albrecht, conductor, Dmitri Tcherniakov, stage director (Opus Arte OA1089D)
- DVD documentaries: Richard Strauss and his Heroines; A Film by Thomas von Steinaecker; Brigitte Fassbaender, Renée Fleming, Gwyneth Jones, Christa Ludwig, Christian Strauss, Rufus Wainwright, Franz Welser-Möst (Arthaus Musik 102181)

== 2016 ==
=== 2016 special awards ===
- Lifetime Achievement Award: Felicity Lott
- Artist of the Year: Christian Lindberg
- Young artist of the Year: Pablo Ferrández
- Discovery Award: Nikolai Song (flautist)
- Label of the Year: Harmonia Mundi
- Special Achievement Award: Palazzetto Bru Zane
- Special Achievement Award: Dinorah Varsi Edition (Genuin)

=== 2016 audio and video categories ===
- Early music: Argentum et Aurum – Musical Treasures of the Early Habsburg Renaissance; Ensemble Leones, Marc Lewon (Naxos 8.573346)
- Baroque instrumental: La Follia, Arcangelo Corelli: 6 Sonatas; Michala Petri, Mahan Esfahani (Our Recordings 6220610)
- Baroque vocal: Agrippina, Porpora – Graun – Händel: Arias; Ann Hallenberg, Il Pomo d’Oro, Riccardo Minasi (Deutsche Harmonia Mundi 88875055982)
- Vocal recital: Joyce & Tony at Wigmore Hall, Haydn – Rossini – Santoliquido – De Curtis – Foster – Kern ...; Joyce DiDonato, Antonio Pappano (Erato 2564610789)
- Choral works: Antonin Dvorak: Requiem; Ilse Eerens, Bernarda Fink, Maximilian Schmitt, Nathan Berg, Collegium Vocale Gent, Royal Flemish Philharmonic, Philippe Herreweghe (PHI LPH 016)
- Opera: Piotr Tchaikovsky: Iolanta; Olesya Golovneva, Alexander Vinogradov, Andrei Bondarenko, Dmytro Popov, Vladislav Sulimsky, John Heuzenroeder, Marc-Olivier Oetterli, Dalia Schaechter, Justyna Samborska, Marta Wryk, Choir of the Cologne Opera – Gürzenich Orchestra Cologne, Dmitri Kitayenko (Oehms Classics OC963)
- Solo instrument: Franz Schubert: Sonatas, Impromptus & Moments Musicaux; Andras Schiff (ECM 4811572)
- Chamber music: Johannes Brahms: Violin Sonatas Nos. 2 & 3 – Robert Schumann: Romances, Brahms/Schumann/Dietrich: F.A.E. Sonata; Isabelle Faust, Alexander Melnikov (Harmonia Mundi HMC902219)
- Concertos: Nikolai Medtner: Piano Concerto No. 3 – Alexander Scriabin: Piano Concerto; Yevgeny Sudbin, Bergen Philharmonic Orchestra, Andrew Litton (BIS Records 2088)
- Symphonic music: Jean Sibelius: Symphonies Nos. 1–7; Berliner Philharmoniker, Sir Simon Rattle (Berliner Philharmoniker Recordings BPHR 150071)
- Contemporary music: Krzysztof Penderecki: Clarinet Concerto, Flute Concerto, Concerto grosso for 3 Cellos and Orchestra; Michel Lethiec, Lukasz Dlugosz, Arto Noras, Bartosz Koziak, Rafal Kwiatkowski, Polish Sinfonia Iuventus Orchestra, Krzysztof Penderecki (Dux 1186)
- Best collection: Guerre et Paix, Blow – Biber – Caldara – Händel ...; Hesperion XXI, Le Concert des Nations, Capella Reial, Jordi Savall (Alia Vox AVSA9908)
- Historical recording: Lucerne Festival Historic Performances Vol. VIII, Beethoven: Piano Concerto No. 2, Schumann: Piano Concerto; Annie Fischer, Leon Fleisher, Swiss Festival Orchestra, George Szell, Philharmonia Orchestra, Carlo Maria Giulini (Audite 95643)
- DVD performance: Gustav Mahler: Symphony No. 7; Gewandhausorchester Leipzig, Riccardo Chailly (Accentus Music ACC20309 42)
- DVD documentaries: Daniil Trifonov, The Magics of Music – The Castelfranco Veneto Recital; By Christopher Nupen (Allegro Films A 19 CND)

== 2017 ==
The Jury announced the winners for 2017 in 22 categories from a nomination list comprising 321 Audio and Video productions (119 Labels).

=== 2017 special awards ===
- Lifetime Achievement Award: Matti Salminen
- Artist of the Year: Tabea Zimmermann
- Young artist of the Year instrumental: Sophie Pacini
- Young artist of the Year vocal: Elsa Dreisig
- Discovery Award: Robert Neumann (pianist)
- Label of the Year: BIS Records
- Special Achievement Award: Klaus Heymann
- Special Achievement Award: Gewandhausorchester Leipzig
- Special Achievement Award: Ensemble Esperanza

=== 2017 audio and video categories ===
- Early music: Roland De Lassus: Canticum Canticorum; Chœur de chambre de Namur, Ensemble Clematis, Leonardo García Alarcón (Ricercar RIC 370)
- Baroque instrumental: L’ange et le diable, Tartini – Locatelli – Vitali – Leclair – Forqueray; Chouchane Siranossian, Jos van Immerseel (Alpha 255)
- Baroque vocal: Serpent & Fire, Purcell – Graupner – Sartorio – Locke – Händel – Hasse – Cavalli; Anna Prohaska, Il Giardino Armonico, Giovanni Antonini (Alpha 250)
- Baroque vocal: J.S. Bach: Johannes-Passion; Werner Güra, Benno Schachtner, Sunhae Im, Sebastian Kohlhepp, Johannes Weisser, RIAS Kammerchor, Staats- & Domchor Berlin, Akademie für Alte Musik Berlin, René Jacobs (Harmonia Mundi HMC802236/37)
- Vocal recital: Schubertiade, Schubert: Lieder, Instrumentalstücke & Rezitation; Julian Prégardien, Marc Hantaï, Xavier Diaz-Latorre, Philippe Pierlot (Myrios MYR018)
- Choral works: Geistliche Gesänge: Reger – J.S. Bach – Nystedt; MDR-Rundfunkchor, Florian Helgath (Querstand VKJK 1627)
- Opera: Claude Vivier: Kopernikus; Svea Schildknecht, Uta Buchheister, Barbara Ostertag, Neal Banerjee, Ji-Su Park, Dorothea Winkel, Florian Kontschak, Holst-Sinfonietta, Opera Factory Freiburg, Klaus Simon (bastille musique bm001)
- Solo instrument: Piotr Tchaikovsky: The Seasons Op. 37bis, Children’s Album Op. 39; Elena Bashkirova (Gideon Boss GB008)
- Solo instrument: Sergei Lyapunov – Works for Piano Vol. 2; Florian Noack (Ars Produktion 38209)
- Chamber music: Duo Sessions, Halvorsen – Kodaly – Ravel – Schulhoff; Julia Fischer & Daniel Müller-Schott (Orfeo C902161A)
- Concertos: Mendelssohn: Violin Concerto op. 64, Schumann: Violin Concerto WoO 234; Carolin Widmann, Chamber Orchestra of Europe (ECM 4812635)
- Symphonic music: Claudio Abbado: The Last Concert, Mendelssohn: Ein Sommernachtstraum, Berlioz: Symphonie fantastique op. 14; Deborah York, Stella Doufexis, Damen des Chors des BR, Berliner Philharmoniker, Claudio Abbado (Berliner Philharmoniker Recordings BPHR 160081)
- Contemporary music: Oriental Trumpet Concertos, Penderecki – Say – Khachaturian – Arutiunian, Gábor Boldoczki, Sinfonietta Cracovia, Jurek Dybal (Sony Classical 88985361092)
- Best collection: Szymanowski: Overture op. 12, Lutoslawski: Cello Concerto, Symphony No. 4; Gautier Capuçon, Polish National Radio Symphony Orchestra, Alexander Liebreich (Accentus ACC30388)
- Historical recording: Mahler – Loewe – Wagner – Brahms – Schubert ...; Maureen Forrester, Hertha Klust, Michael Raucheisen, Felix Schröder (Audite 21437)
- Video performance: Alban Berg: Wozzeck; Christian Gerhaher, Gun-Brit Barkmin, Brandon Jovanovich, Mauro Peter, Wolfgang Ablinger-Sperrhacke, Lars Woldt, Pavel Daniluk, Cheyne Davidson, Martin Zysset, Irène Friedli, Philharmonia Zürich, Chor der Oper Zürich, Fabio Luisi, Stage Director: Andreas Homoki (Accentus Music)
- Video documentaries: Leonard Bernstein – Larger than Life; A Film by Georg Wübbolt (C Major 735908)

== 2018 ==
The jury has nominated 357 audio and video productions.

=== 2018 special awards ===
- Lifetime Achievement Award: José van Dam
- Artist of the Year: Manfred Honeck
- Young artist of the Year: Christoph Sietzen (percussionist)
- Outstanding young Polish Artist: Szymon Nehring (pianist)
- Discovery Award: Yuan Yu (flautist)
- Label of the Year: Alpha
- Special Achievement Award: Krzysztof Penderecki Center Lusławice
- Special Achievement Award: Polish National Radio Symphony Orchestra in Katowice
- Special Achievement Award: Melodiya: Anthology of Russian Symphonic Music

=== 2018 audio and video categories ===
- Early Music: Quattrocento – Musica y danza de la Corona de Aragon en Napoles; Capella de Ministrers, Carles Magraner (Capella de Ministrers CDM 1742)
- Baroque Instrumental: Vivaldi: The Concertos for Recorder; Stefan Temmingh, Capricornus Consort Basel (Accent ACC24332)
- Baroque Vocal: The Händel Album; Philippe Jaroussky, Ensemble Artaserse (Erato 190295774455)
- Vocal Recital: Visions, Bizet – Bruneau – David – Février – Franck – Godard – Halévy – Massenet – Niedermeyer – Saint-Saëns; Véronique Gens, Münchner Rundfunkorchester, Hervé Niquet (Alpha 279)
- Choral: Felix Nowowiejski: Quo vadis; Wioletta Chodowicz, Wojtek Gierlach, Robert Gierlach, Slawomir Kaminski, Podlaskie Opera and Philharmonic Choir, Poznan Philharmonic Orchestra, Lukasz Borowicz (cpo 5550892)
- Opera: Camille Saint-Saëns: Proserpine; Véronique Gens, Marie-Adeline Henry, Frédéric Antoun, Andrew Foster-Williams, Jean Teitgen, Münchner Rundfunkorchester, Flemish Radio Choir, Ulf Schirmer (Ediciones Singulares ES1027)
- Solo Instrument: Franz Schubert: Piano Sonatas D 959 & D 960; Krystian Zimerman (Deutsche Grammophon 4797588)
- Chamber Music: Ludwig van Beethoven: Complete String Quartets Vol. VII & VIII, Beethoven: Quartets op. 18/2 & op. 59/3 – op. 18/3 & op. 74; Quartetto di Cremona (Audite 92.689 + 92.688)
- Concertos: Elgar: Cello Concerto – Martinu: Cello Concerto No. 1; Sol Gabetta, Berliner Philharmoniker, Simon Rattle, Krzysztof Urbanski (Sony Classical 88985350792)
- Symphonic: Bohuslav Martinu: The Symphonies; ORF Vienna Radio Symphony Orchestra, Cornelius Meister (Capriccio C5320)
- Contemporary: Tigran Mansurian: Requiem; Anja Petersen, Andrew Redmond, RIAS Kammerchor Berlin, Münchener Kammerorchester, Alexander Liebreich (ECM 4814101)
- Assorted Programs: Jean Sibelius: Tapiola – En Saga – 8 Songs (orchestrated by Aulis Sallinen); Anne-Sofie von Otter, Finnish Radio Symphony Orchestra, Hannu Lintu (Ondine ODE12895)
- Best Collection: Beethoven: The Complete Symphonies; Simona Saturova, Mihoko Fujimura, Christian Elsner, Christian Gerhaher, MDR Rundfunkchor, GewandhausChor & GewandhausKinderchor, Gewandhausorchester Leipzig, Herbert Blomstedt (Accentus Music ACC80322)
- Historical: Svjatoslav Richter plays Schubert, Live in Moscow, 1949–1963; Svjatoslav Richter (Profil PH17005)
- DVD Performance: Rereading Brahms, Brahms: The Symphonies; Orchestra della Svizzera Italiana, Markus Poschner (Sony Classical 88985388869)

== 2019 ==
ICMA Jury nominates 319 releases from 107 labels for the 2019 awards.

=== 2019 special awards ===
- Lifetime Achievement Award: Nelson Freire
- Artist of the Year: Javier Perianes
- Young artist of the Year: Matko Smolcic (bassoonist)
- Discovery Award: Eva Gevorgyan (pianist)
- Label of the Year: Ars Produktion
- Composer Award: Francisco Coll
- Orchestra Award: Stephen Waarts (violinist)
- Special Achievement Award: Numa Bischof Ullmann

=== 2019 audio and video categories ===
- Early Music: Music In Medieval Denmark: 13th – 15th Century; Ensemble Peregrina, Agnieszka Budzinska-Bennett, Benjamin Bagby (Tacet 243)
- Baroque Instrumental: Johann Sebastian Bach: Violin Concertos BWV 1041, 1042, 1052; Berliner Barock Solisten, Frank Peter Zimmermann (Hänssler Classic 17046)
- Baroque Vocal: 17th Century Sacred Music in Wroclaw; Concerto Palatino, Gli Angeli Genève, Wroclaw Baroque Orchestra, Stephan MacLeod (Claves 501805)
- Vocal Recital: Miroir(s), Gounod – Massenet – Puccini – Steibelt – Rossini – Mozart – R. Strauss; Elsa Dreisig, soprano, Orchestre National de Montpellier, Michael Schønwandt (Erato 190295634131)
- Choral: Sergei Prokofiev: Cantata for the 20th Anniversary of the October Revolution; Ernst Senff Choir (Steffen Schubert, choir director) – Erfurt Air Force Music Corps, Staatskapelle Weimar, Kirill Karabits (Audite 97754)
- Opera: Gioacchino Rossini: Semiramide; Albina Shagimuratova, Daniela Barcellona, Mirco Palazzi, Barry Banks, Gianluca Buratto, Susana Gaspar, David Butt Philip, James Platt, Opera Rara Chorus – Orchestra of the Age of Enlightenment, Mark Elder (Opera Rara 9293800572)
- Solo Instrument: Wolfgang A. Mozart: Fantasy K. 475 + Piano Sonatas Nos. 14, 16 & 18; Maxim Emelyanychev (Aparté AP 161)
- Chamber Music: Es war einmal – Once upon a time, Robert Schumann: Märchenerzählungen op. 132, Fantasiestücke op. 73 + Märchenbilder op. 113, Jörg Widmann: 5 Stücke im Märchenton; Jörg Widmann, Tabea Zimmermann, Dénes Várjon (Myrios MYR020)
- Concertos: The Golden Age – Cello 1925, Hindemith: Kammermusik No. 3 – Ibert: Concerto for Cello & Wind Instruments, Toch: Cello Concerto – Martinu: Concertino for Cello, Winds, Percussion & Piano; Christoph Heesch, Eroica Berlin, Jakob Lehmann (Genuin GEN18613)
- Concertos: Bartok: Violin Concertos Nos. 1 & 2; Christian Tetzlaff, Finnish Radio Symphony Orchestra, Hannu Lintu (Ondine ODE1317-2)
- Symphonic: Sibelius: Symphony No. 2 – Grieg: Allegretto grazioso + Melody Op. 34/2; Gürzenich-Orchester Köln, Dmitri Kitayenko (Oehms Classics OC457)
- Symphonic: Bernstein: Complete Symphonies + Prelude, Fugue & Riffs; Marie-Nicole Lemieux, Beatrice Rana, Nadine Sierra, Josephine Barstow, Orchestra dell'Accademia Nazionale di Santa Cecilia and Choir, Antonio Pappano (Warner Classics 01902956 61588)
- Contemporary: Arvo Pärt: Symphonies Nos. 1- 4; NFM Wroclaw Philharmonic, Tõnu Kaljuste (ECM New Series 2600)
- Assorted Programs: In Time, Felix Mendelssohn: Violin Concerto op. 64 + String Octet op. 20; Chouchane Siranossian, Anima Eterna Brugge, Jakob Lehmann, Balasz Bozzai, Nicolas Mazzoleni, Bernadette Verhagen, Katya Polin, Davit Melkonyan, Astrig Siranossian (Alpha 410)
- Best Collection: Jean Sibelius: Incidental Music; Turku Philharmonic Orchestra, Leif Segerstam (Naxos 8.506032)
- Historical: Birgit Nilsson. The Great Live Recordings (Sony Classical 88985392322)
- Video Performance: Bartok: Bluebeard’s Castle – Poulenc: La Voix Humaine; Barbara Hannigan, John Relyea, Ekaterina Gubanova, Paris Opera Orchestra, Esa-Pekka Salonen, Krzysztof Warlikowski (Arthaus Musik 109364)
- Video Performance: Mozart: Le Nozze di Figaro; Ildebrando D’Arcangelo, Dorothea Röschmann, Anna Prohaska, Lauri Vasar, Marianne Crebassa, Staatsoper Unter den Linden, Berlin, Gustavo Dudamel, Jürgen Flimm & Bettina Hartmann (Accentus Music ACC20366)
- Video Documentaries: Belcanto – The Tenors of the 78 Era; Documentary by Jan Schmidt-Garre, Caruso, Slezak, Tauber, McCormack, Schipa, Gigli, Schmidt, Koslovsky, Björling et al. (Naxos 2110389-91)

== 2020 ==
ICMA Jury nominates 390 audio and video productions from 130 labels for the 2020 awards.

=== 2020 special awards ===
- Lifetime Achievement Award: Elisabeth Leonskaja
- Artist of the Year: Marina Rebeka
- Young artist of the Year: Erica Piccotti (cellist)
- Discovery Award: Philipp Schupelius (cellist)
- Label of the Year: Pentatone Classics
- Orchestra Award: Pepe Romero (guitarist)
- Composer Award: Ivan Boumans
- Special Achievement Award: John Axelrod, Jérôme Lejeune

=== 2020 audio and video categories ===
- Early Music: Willaert e la Scuola Fiamminga a San Marco; Cappella Marciana, La Pifarescha, Marco Gemmani (Concerto Classics 2117)
- Baroque Instrumental: Night Music, Vivaldi – Gerardo – Eyck – Lully – Hotteterre – Biber; Dorothee Oberlinger, I Sonatori de la Gioiosa Marca (Deutsche Harmonia Mundi 190759 12522)
- Baroque Vocal: Georg Friedrich Händel: Serse; Franco Fagioli, Vivica Genaux, Inga Kalna, Francesca Aspromonte, Andrea Mastroni, Delphine Galou, Biagio Pizzuti, Il Pomo d’Oro, Maxim Emelyanychev (Deutsche Grammophon 4835784)
- Vocal Music: Franz Schubert: Winterreise; Ian Bostridge, Thomas Adès (Pentatone Classics PTC 518676)
- Choral Music: Piotr Tchaikovsky: Liturgy of St. John Chrysostom – Nine Sacred Choruses; Latvian Radio Choir, Sigvards Klava (Ondine ODE 1336-2)
- Choral Music: Arthur Honegger: Jeanne d’Arc au Bûcher; Judith Chemla, Jean-Claude Drouot, Christian Gonon, Adrien Gamba-Gontard, Claire de Sévigné, Christine Goerke, Judit Kutasi, Jean-Noël Briend, Steven Humes, Rotterdam Symphony Chorus, Netherlands Children’s Choir, Royal Concertgebouw Orchestra, Stéphane Denève (RCO Live)
- Opera: Antonio Salieri: Tarare; Judith van Wanroij, Jérôme Boutillier, Tassis Christoyannis, Philippe-Nicolas Martin, Cyrille Dubois, Jean-Sébastien Bou, Marine Lafdal-Franc, Danaé Monnié, Enguerrand de Hys, Karine Deshayes, Les Chantres du Centre de Musique Baroque de Versailles, Les Talens Lyriques, Christophe Rousset (Aparté)
- Solo Instrument: Beethoven/Liszt – Schubert – Haydn – Say – Bartok – Sasaki; Can Çakmur, piano (BIS 2430)
- Solo Instrument: Schubert: Sonata D 960 – Drei Klavierstücke D 946 – Moments Musicaux D 780; Dina Ugorskaja (Cavi 8553107)
- Chamber Music: Lili Boulanger: Nocturne – César Franck: Violin Sonata – Louis Vierne: Violin Sonata Op. 23 Eugène Ysaÿe: Poème élégiaque Op. 12; Alina Ibragimova, Cédric Tiberghien (Hyperion CDA68024)
- Concertos: Ferruccio Busoni: Piano Concerto; Kirill Gerstein, Men of the Tanglewood Festival Chorus, Boston Symphony Orchestra, Sakari Oramo (Myrios MYR024)
- Symphonic Music: Ludwig van Beethoven: Complete Symphonies; Sara Swietlicki, Morten Grove Frandsen, Ilker Arcayürek, Lars Møller, Danish National Concert Choir, Danish Chamber Orchestra, Ádám Fischer (Naxos 8.505251)
- Contemporary Music: Dusapin: Penthesilea; Georg Nigl, Natascha Petrinsky, Marisol Montalvo, Werner van Mechelen, Eve-Maud Hubeau, Wiard Withol, Yaroslava Kozin, Marta Baretta, Orchestre Symphonique et Chœurs de la Monnaie, Franck Ollu (Cyprès CYP4654)
- Assorted Programs: Antonio Vivaldi: Arias & instrumental works; Léa Desandre, Bruno Philippe, Peter Whelan, Jean Rondeau, Cecilia Bernardini, Louis Creac’h, Jérôme Van Waerbeke, Douglas Balliett, Jupiter, Thomas Dunford (Alpha 550)
- Best Collection: Mieczysław Weinberg: Chamber Music; Aleksey Mikhlin, Evgeniya Seydel, Alexander Brusilovsky, Fyodor Druzhinin, Alla Vasilieva, Mieczysław Weinberg, Timofei Dokschitzer, Moscow Chamber Orchestra, Moscow Philharmonic Orchestra, Borodin Quartet, Algis Zhuraitis, Rudolf Barshai (Melodiya MELCD 1002519)
- Historical Recordings: Wilhelm Furtwängler – The Radio Recordings 1939–1945; Edwin Fischer, Peter Anders, Walter Gieseking, Tilla Briem, Elisabeth Höngen, Rudolf Watzke, Erna Berger, Walther Ludwig, Fritz Heitmann, Georg Kulenkampff, Conrad Hansen, Pierre Fournier, Adrian Aeschbacher, Berliner Philharmoniker, Wilhelm Furtwängler (Berliner Philharmoniker Recordings)
- Video Performance: Richard Strauss: Salome; Asmik Grigorian, John Daszak, Anna Maria Chiuri, Gábor Bretz, Julian Prégardien, Wiener Philharmoniker, Franz Welser-Möst, Romeo Castellucci, stage director (Unitel Edition 801608)
- Video Documentaries: Gidon Kremer – Finding your own voice; Directed Paul Smaczny, Kremerata Baltica, Giedre Dirvanauskaite, Tatjana Grindenko, Olesya Petrova, Evgeny Svetlanov Orchestra, Vladimir Jurowski, Yomiuri Nippon Symphony, Jacek Kaspszyk, Mieczyslaw Weinberg: Preludes to a Lost Time (Accentus ACC20414)

== 2021 ==
ICMA Jury has nominated 365 audio and video productions from 122 labels.

=== 2021 special awards ===
- Lifetime Achievement Award: Edita Gruberová
- Artist of the Year: Pablo Heras-Casado
- Young artist of the Year: Can Cakmur (pianist)
- Discovery Award: Maya Wichert (violinist)
- Label of the Year: Berliner Philharmoniker Recordings
- Orchestra Award: Marc Bouchkov (violinist), Kian Soltani (cellist)
- Special Achievement Award: Drazen Domjanic, Ingolf Turban (violinist)

=== 2021 audio and video categories ===
- Early Music: Bonefont – Bruck – Gombert – Kerle – Lassus; Huelgas Ensemble, Paul van Nevel (Cyprès CYP1682)
- Baroque Instrumental: Giuseppe Tartini: Violin Concertos; Chouchane Siranossian, Venice Baroque Orchestra, Andrea Marcon (Alpha 596)
- Baroque Instrumental: The Berlin Album, Benda – Graun – Janitsch – Kirnberger – von Preußen – Schulz; Ensemble Diderot, Johannes Pramsohler (Audax ADX13726)
- Baroque Vocal: La Francesina, Handel’s Nightingale; Sophie Junker, Le Concert de l’Hostel Dieu, Franck-Emmanuel Comte (Aparté AP233)
- Vocal Music: Anima Rara, Catalani – Giordano – Leoncavallo – Mascagni – Massenet – Puccini; Ermonela Jaho, Orquestra de la Comunitat Valenciana, Andrea Battistoni (Opera Rara ORR253)
- Choral Music: Igor Kuljerić: Glagolitic Requiem, Jakov Gotovac: Himna Slobodi; Kristina Kolar, Eric Laporte, Annika Schlicht, Ljubomir Puskaric, Chor des Bayerischen Rundfunks, Münchner Rundfunkorchester, Ivan Repusic (BR Klassik 900331)
- Opera: Camille Saint-Saëns: Le Timbre d’Argent Hélène Guilmette; Jodie Devos, Edgaras Montvidas, Yu Shao, Tassis Christoyannis, Jean-Yves Ravoux, Matthieu Chapuis, Accentus, Les Siècles, François-Xavier Roth (Bru Zane BZ1041)
- Solo Instrument: Maurice Ravel: La Valse, Miroirs – Igor Stravinsky: The Firebird, Petrushka; Beatrice Rana (Warner Classics 9029541109)
- Chamber Music: Fantasque, Fauré: Violin Sonata No. 1 – Debussy: Violin Sonata – Ravel: Violin Sonata No. 2 – Poulenc: Violin Sonata; Franziska Pietsch, Josu de Solaun (Audite 97751)
- Concertos: Dmitri Shostakovich: Cello Concertos Nos. 1 & 2; Alban Gerhardt, WDR Sinfonieorchester Köln, Jukka-Pekka Saraste (Hyperion CDA68340)
- Symphonic Music: Beethoven: Symphonies Nos. 7 & 9 – Tchaikovsky: Symphonies Nos. 5 & 6 – Franz Schmidt: Symphony No. 4 – Stephan: Music for Orchestra; Marlis Petersen, Elisabeth Kulman, Benjamin Bruns, Kwangchul Youn, Rundfunkchor Berlin, Berliner Philharmoniker, Kirill Petrenko (Berliner Philharmoniker Recordings)
- Contemporary Music: Thomas Adès: Powder Her Face, Berceuse, Mazurkas, In Seven Days; Kirill Gerstein, Tanglewood Music Centre Orchestra, Thomas Adès (Myrios MYR027)
- Assorted Programs: Beethoven: Piano Concerto No. 4, Coriolan Overture, The Creatures of Prometheus Overture; Kristian Bezuidenhout, Freiburger Barockorchester, Pablo Heras-Casado (Harmonia Mundi HMM 902413)
- Best Collection: Dmitrij Kitajenko Collection, Bernstein – Butsko – Flyarkovsky – Gabeli – Kabalevsky – Khachaturian – Rachmaninov – Rimsky-Korsakov – R. Strauss – Theodorakis – Yanchenko; Various soloists, Stanislavsky and Nemirovich-Danchenko Moscow Academic Music Theatre Orchestra, Moscow Philharmonic Orchestra, Dmitrij Kitajenko (Melodiya)
- Historical Recordings: Live in Moscow 1951–1963, Dmitri Shostakovich: 24 Preludes and Fugues op. 87; Svjatoslav Richter, Emil Gilels, Tatiana Nikolayeva, Dmitri Shostakovich (Profil PH 20054)
- Video Performance: Rachmaninov: Piano concerto No. 3 + Etude-Tableau + Vocalise + Symphony No. 3; Denis Matsuev, Lucerne Festival Orchestra, Riccardo Chailly (Accentus Music ACC20487)
- Video Performance: Thomas: Hamlet; Stéphane Degout, Sabine Devieilhe, Laurent Alvaro, Sylvie Brunet-Grupposo, Nicolas Legoux, Julien Behr, Jérôme Varnier, Yoann Dubruque, Kevin Amiel, Chœur Les Eléments, Orchestre des Champs-Elysées, Louis Langrée, conductor, Cyril Teste, stage director (Naxos 2.11064 & NBD0103V)
- Video Documentaries: Lucas Debargue – To Music; A film by Martin Mirabel (Naxos 2.110639 & NBD0101V)

== 2022 ==
ICMA Jury has nominated 377 audio and video productions from 129 labels.

=== 2022 special awards ===
- Lifetime Achievement Award: Ádám Fischer
- Artist of the Year: Martin Fröst
- Young artist of the Year: Gennaro Cardaropoli (violinist)
- Discovery Award: Julian Kainrath (violinist)
- Composer Award: Sebastian Androne
- Label of the Year: Château de Versailles Spectacles
- Orchestra Award: Francisco Coll García (composer)
- Special Achievement Award: Pierre Cao (conductor), Michael Korstick (pianist)

=== 2022 audio and video categories ===
- Early Music: Basevi Codex – Music at the Court of Margaret of Austria; Dorothee Mields, Boreas Quartett Bremen (Audite 97.783)
- Baroque Instrumental: The Mad Lover, Eccles – Purcell – Dunford – Matteis; Théotime Langlois de Swarte, Thomas Dunford (Harmonia Mundi HMM902305)
- Baroque Vocal: Anima Aeterna, Fux – Handel – Nucci – Zelenka; Jakub Józef Orliński, Il Pomo d’Oro, Francesco Corti (Erato 9029674390)
- Vocal Music: Schumann: Complete Songs; Christian Gerhaher, Gerold Huber (Sony Classical 19439780112)
- Choral Music: Gioachino Rossini: Petite Messe Solennelle; Sandrine Piau, Josè Maria Lo Monaco, Edgardo Rocha, Christian Senn, Francesco Corti, Cristiano Gaudio, Daniel Perer, Coro Ghislieri, Giulio Prandi (Arcana A494)
- Opera: Vincenzo Bellini: Il Pirata; Javier Camarena, Marina Rebeka, Franco Vassallo, Antonio Di Matteo, Gustavo De Gennaro, Sonia Fortunato, Orchestra e Coro del Teatro Massimo Bellini di Catania, Fabrizio Maria Carminati (Prima Classic PRIMA010)
- Solo Instrument: Niccolò Paganini: 24 Caprices; Alina Ibragimova (Hyperion CDA68366)
- Solo Instrument: Leoš Janáček: On an Overgrown Path – Piano Sonata 1.X.1905 – In the Mists; Lars Vogt (Ondine ODE1382-2)
- Chamber Music: Ludwig van Beethoven: Violin Sonatas Nos. 8-10; Frank Peter Zimmermann, Martin Helmchen (BIS 2537)
- Concertos: Beethoven – Berg – Bartók; Frank Peter Zimmermann, Berliner Philharmoniker, Alan Gilbert, Daniel Harding, Kirill Petrenko (Berliner Philharmoniker Recordings BPHR210151)
- Symphonic Music: Anton Bruckner: Symphony No. 4 (3 versions); Bamberger Symphoniker, Jakub Hrůša (Accentus Music ACC 30533)
- Contemporary Music: Francisco Coll, Violin Concerto – Hidd’n Blue – Mural – 4 Iberian Miniatures – Aqua Cinerea; Patricia Kopatchinskaja, Orchestre Philharmonique du Luxembourg, Gustavo Gimeno (Pentatone PTC 5186951)
- Assorted Programs: Nikolai Kapustin, Piano Concerto No. 4 – Concerto for violin, piano & strings – Chamber Symphony Op. 105; Frank Dupree, Rosanne Philippens, Württembergisches Kammerorchester Heilbronn, Case Scaglione, Frank Dupree (Capriccio C5437)
- Historical Recordings: The Complete Wilhelm Furtwängler on Records; Various composers, Berliner Philharmoniker, London Philharmonic Orchestra, Lucerne Festival Orchestra, Philharmonia Orchestra, Wiener Philharmoniker, Wilhelm Furtwängler (Warner Classics 019025232405)
- Premiere Recordings: Antonio Salieri: Armida; Lenneke Ruiten, Florie Valiquette, Teresa Iervolino, Ashley Riches, Chœur de chambre de Namur, Les Talens Lyriques, Christophe Rousset (Aparté AP244)
- Video Performance: Erich Wolfgang Korngold: Die tote Stadt; Jonas Kaufmann, Marlis Petersen, Andrzej Filonczyk, Jennifer Johnston, Mirjam Mesak, Corinna Scheuerle, Manuel Günther, Dean Power, Chor der Bayerischen Staatsoper, Bayerisches Staatsorchester, Kirill Petrenko, Simon Stone (Regie) (Bayerische Staatsoper Recordings BSOREC1001)
- Video Documentaries: A World Without Beethoven?; Sarah Willis, Martin Roddewig, Deutsche Welle/BFMI (Bernhard Fleischer Moving Images) (C-Major 757008)

== 2023 ==
ICMA Jury has nominated 391 audio and video productions from 117 labels.

=== 2023 special awards ===
- Lifetime Achievement Award: David Geringas
- Artist of the Year: Ermonela Jaho
- Young artist of the Year: Saò Soulez-Larivière (violist)
- Discovery Award: Leonhard Baumgartner (violinist)
- Label of the Year: Naxos
- Composer Award: David Philip Hefti
- ICMA Classeek Award: Marc-André Teruel (double bassist)
- Orchestra Award: Karol Mossakowski (organist)
- Special Achievement Award: National Forum of Music, Alessandro Marangoni (pianist)

=== 2023 audio and video categories ===
- Early Music: El Collar de la Paloma, Ibn Hazm of Cordoba; Capella de Ministrers, Carlos Magraner, (Capella de Ministrers CdM 2253)
- Baroque Instrumental: Bach: Italian Concerto – French Overture; Mahan Esfahani (Hyperion CDA68336)
- Baroque Vocal: Handel: Semele; Ana Maria Labin, Lawrence Zazzo, Millenium Orchestra, Leonardo Garcia Alarcón (Ricercar 437)
- Vocal Music: Dissonance, Rachmaninov: Melodies; Asmik Grigorian, Lukas Geniusas (Alpha 796)
- Choral Music: Rossini: Messa di Gloria; Eleonora Buratto, Teresa Iervolino, Lawrence Brownlee, Michael Spyres, Carlo Lepore, Orchestra e Coro dell’Accademia Nazionale di Santa Cecilia, Antonio Pappano (Warner Classics 5419723452)
- Opera: Debussy: Pelléas et Mélisande; Julian Behr, Vannina Santoni, Alexandre Duhamel, Marie-Ange Todorovitch, Jean Teitgen, Hadrien Joubert, Chœur de l’Opéra de Lille, Les Siècles, François-Xavier Roth (Harmonia Mundi HMM90535254)
- Solo Instrument: Haydn: Piano Sonatas; Josu de Solaun (IBS 52022)
- Chamber Music: Into Madness, Bartok – Enescu – Achron; Tassilo Probst, Maxim Lando (Berlin Classics 0302767BC)
- Concertos: Beethoven & Stravinsky: Violin Concertos; Vilde Frang, Deutsche Kammerphilharmonie Bremen, Pekka Kuusisto (Warner Classics 9029667740)
- Symphonic Music: Rott: Symphony No. 1 – Mahler: Blumine – Bruckner: Symphonic Prelude; Bamberger Symphoniker, Jakub Hrůša (Deutsche Grammophon 4862932)
- Contemporary Music: Holliger: Lunea; Christian Gerhaher, Juliane Banse, Ivan Ludlow, Sarah Maria Sun, Annette Schönmüller, Philharmonia Zürich, Basler Madrigalisten, Heinz Holliger (ECM 2622)
- Assorted Programs: Salonen: Cello Concerto – Ravel: Duo Sonata; Nicolas Altstaedt, Pekka Kuusisto, Rotterdam Philharmonic Orchestra, Dima Slobodeniouk (Alpha 627)
- Historical Recordings: Haydn: Symphony No. 99 – Schönberg: Piano Concerto op. 42, Tchaikovsky: Symphony No. 4; John Ogdon, New Philharmonia Orchestra, Rafael Kubelík (Audite 95.745)
- Premiere Recordings: Conrado del Campo: String Quartets Nos. 3 & 5; Quatuor Diotima (MarchVivo MV005)
- Video: Opera: Hans Abrahamsen: The Snow Queen; Barbara Hannigan, Rachael Wilson, Katarina Dalayman, Peter Rose, Caroline Wettergreen, Dean Power, Kevin Conners, Owen Willets, Orchestra & Chorus of the Bayerische Staatsoper, Cornelius Meister, Andreas Kriegenburg (Bayerische Staatsoper Recordings BSOREC1002)
- Video: Performance & Documentaries: Metanoia, Bach – Borodin – Morricone – Pärt – Puccini – Villa-Lobos; Manon Galy, Ensemble K – Sequenza 9.3, Simone Menezes, Paul Smaczny (Accentus Music ACC20550)

== 2024 ==
ICMA Jury has nominated 375 audio and video productions from 115 labels.

=== 2024 special awards ===
- Lifetime Achievement Award: Güher Pekinel and Süher Pekinel
- Artist of the Year: Renaud Capuçon
- Young artist of the Year: Aida Pascu (soprano)
- Discovery Award: Lana Zorjan (violinist)
- Composer Award: Orazio Sciortino
- ICMA Classeek Award: Cassie Martin (guitarist)
- Label of the Year: Bru Zane
- Special Achievement Award: Bruno Monsaingeon (filmmaker), Sylvain Cambreling (conductor), #bruckner24 / The Complete Versions Edition (CD)

=== 2024 audio and video categories ===
- Early Music: Oriente Lux; Orpheus 21, Hespèrion XXI, Jordi Savall (Alia Vox AVSA9954)
- Baroque Instrumental: Sonate a quattro, Goldberg – Telemann – Händel – Fasch – Janitsch; Ensemble Diderot, Johannes Pramsohler (Audax ADX11201)
- Baroque Vocal: Jouissons de Nos Beaux Ans!, De Bury – Dauvergne – Francoeur – Cassanéa de Mondonville – Rameau – Rebel – Royer; Cyrille Dubois, Orfeo Orchestra, Purcell Choir, György Vashegyi (Aparté AP319)
- Vocal Music: Les Heures Claires, Nadia & Lili Boulanger: The Complete Songs; Lucile Richardot, Stéphane Degout, Emmanuelle Bertrand, Anne de Fornel, Raquel Camarinha, Sarah Nemtanu (Harmonia Mundi HMM90235658)
- Choral Music: André Caplet: Le Miroir de Jésus; Anke Vondung, Chor des Bayerischen Rundfunks, Münchner Rundfunkorchester, Howard Arman (BR Klassik 900342)
- Opera: Giacomo Puccini: Turandot; Sondra Radvanovsky, Jonas Kaufmann, Ermonela Jaho, Michael Spyres, Michele Pertusi, Orchestra dell'Accademia Nazionale di Santa Cecilia, Coro dell’Accademia Nazionale di Santa Cecilia, Antonio Pappano (Warner Classics 5419740659)
- Solo Instrument: Eugène Ysaÿe: Six Sonatas for Violin Solo Op. 27; Hilary Hahn (Deutsche Grammophon 503130)
- Chamber Music: Schubert: Trio D 898, Notturno D 897, Rondo D 895, Piano Trio D 929, Arpeggione Sonata; Christian Tetzlaff, Tanja Tetzlaff, Lars Vogt (Ondine ODE 1394-2D)
- Concertos: Wolfgang A. Mozart: Violin Concertos Nos. 3-5; Kristian Bezuidenhout, Freiburger Barockorchester, Gottfried von der Goltz (Aparté AP299)
- Symphonic Music:Anton Bruckner: Symphony No. 8; Tonhalle-Orchester Zürich, Paavo Järvi (Alpha 987)
- Contemporary Music: Reconnaissance, Kaija Saariaho: Choir Works; Anna Kuvaja, Timo Kurkikangas, Helsinki Chamber Choir, Uusinta Ensemble, Nils Schweckendiek (BIS 2662)
- Assorted Programs: Maurice Ravel: L’heure espagnole – Boléro; Isabelle Druet, Julien Behr, Loïc Félix, Thomas Dolié, Jean Teitgen, Les Siècles, François-Xavier Roth (Harmonia Mundi HAF 905361)
- Historical Recordings: Herbert von Karajan – The Early Lucerne Years, Beethoven – Mozart – Bach – Brahms – Honegger; Robert Casadesus, Geza Anda, Clara Haskil, Nathan Milstein, Swiss Festival Orchestra, Herbert von Karajan (Audite 21464)
- Premiere Recordings: Jules Massenet: Ariane; Amina Edris, Marianne Croux, Judith van Wanroij, Jean-Francois Borras, Yoann Dubruque, Chor des Bayerischen Rundfunks, Münchner Rundfunkorchester, Laurent Campellone (Bru Zane BZ1053)
- Video: Opera: Leos Janáček: Káťa Kabanová; Corinne Winters, Evelyn Herlitzius, David Butt Philip, Benjamin Hulett, Jens Larsen, Konzertvereinigung Wiener Staatsopernchor, Wiener Philharmoniker, Jakub Hrůša, Barrie Kosky (Unitel Edition 810116 91001)
- Video: Performance & Documentaries: When music resounds, the soul is spoken to – Herbert Blomstedt; Documentary by Paul Smaczny (Accentus Music ACC20417)

== 2025 ==
ICMA Jury has nominated 374 audio and video productions from 117 labels.

=== 2025 awards ===
- Lifetime Achievement Award: Gidon Kremer
- Artist of the Year: Leonardo García Alarcón
- Young artist of the Year: Benjamin Kruithof (cellist)
- Discovery Award: Can Saraç (pianist)
- Composer Award: Christoph Ehrenfellner
- ICMA Classeek Award: Ettore Pagano (cellist)
- Label of the Year: BR-Klassik
- Special Achievement Award: Ádám Fischer (conductor), Oliver Triendl (pianist), Düsseldorf Symphony Orchestra
- Early Music: Il Concerto Caccini, Strozzi – Caccini – Philips – de Cavalieri – Anonymous; Scherzi Musicali, Nicolas Achten (Ricercar RIC 463)
- Baroque Instrumental: Johann Sebastian Bach: Partitas Nos. 1-6 BWV 825-830; Martin Helmchen (Alpha 994)
- Baroque Vocal: Invocazioni Mariane, Porpora – Vinci – Anfossi – Pergolesi – Vivaldi – Ragazzi; Andreas Scholl, Accademia Bizantina, Alessandro Tampieri (Naïve V5474)
- Vocal Music: Urlicht, Mahler – Zemlinsky – Humperdinck – Korngold – Pfitzner – Braunfels – Berg; Samuel Hasselhorn, Julia Grüter, The Poznań Nightingales Boys’ Choir, Poznań Philharmonic Orchestra, Łukasz Borowicz (Harmonia Mundi HMM902384)
- Choral Music: Bruckners Welt, Anton Bruckner: Mass No. 2, Sacred works; Chor des Bayerischen Rundfunks, Münchner Rundfunkorchester, Peter Dijkstra (BR Klassik 900940)
- Opera: Richard Wagner: Parsifal; Jonas Kaufmann, Ludovic Tézier, Elina Garanča, Georg Zeppenfeld, Wolfgang Koch, Stefan Cerny, Chor und Orchester der Wiener Staatsoper, Philippe Jordan (Sony Classical 19439947742)
- Solo Instrument: Schubert: Piano Sonata D 840 + Hungarian Melody D 817 + Allegretto D 915, Krenek: Piano Sonata No. 2, Can Çakmur (BIS 2690)
- Chamber Music: Shostakovich: String Quartets Nos. 1-15, Quartet movement in E flat major, Two Pieces for String Quartet op. 22 & Op. 29; Danel Quartet (Accentus Music ACC80585)
- Concertos: Edward Elgar: Violin Concerto in B minor, Carissima, The Gardens at Eastwell, Vilde Frang, violin, Deutsches Symphonie-Orchester Berlin, Robin Ticciati (Warner Classic 5021732409423)
- Symphonic Music: George Enescu: Symphonies Nos. 1-3, Romanian Rhapsodies op. 11, Choeur de Radio France, Orchestre National de France, Cristian Măcelaru (Deutsche Grammophon 4865505)
- Contemporary Music: Unsuk Chin: Violin Concerto No. 1, Cello Concerto, Le Silence des sirènes, Rocaná, Chorós Chordón, Piano Concerto; Christian Tetzlaff, Alban Gerhardt, Sunwook Kim, Barbara Hannigan, Berliner Philharmoniker, Myung-Whun Chung, Daniel Harding, Sakari Oramo, Simon Rattle (Berliner Philharmoniker Recordings 230411)
- Contemporary Music:John Adams: City Noir, Fearful Symmetries, Girls of the Golden West, Lola Montez Does the Spider Dance; ORF Radio-Symphonieorchester Wien, Marin Alsop (Naxos 8.559935)
- Assorted Programs: Alfred Schnittke: Piano Concerto – Paul Hindemith: Mathis der Maler, The Four Temperaments; Anna Gourari, piano, Orchestra della Svizzera italiana, Markus Poschner (ECM 2752)
- Historical Recordings: Brahms & Mozart: Geza Anda Live 1963 & 1974, Johannes Brahms: Piano Concerto No. 1 – Wolfgang Amadeus Mozart: Piano Concerto No. 18; Géza Anda, piano, Wiener Philharmoniker, Philharmonia Orchestra, Karl Böhm (Prospero Classical PROSP0100)
- Premiere Recordings: Saint-Saëns: Déjanire; Kate Aldrich, Julien Dran, Anaïs Constans, Jérôme Boutillier, Anna Dowsley, Orchestre Philharmonique de Monte-Carlo, Kazuki Yamada (Bru Zane BZ1055)
- Video: Opera: Johann Strauß: Die Fledermaus; Diana Damrau, Georg Nigl, Katharina Konradi, Martin Winkler, Chor der Bayerischen Staatsoper, Orchester der Bayerischen Staatsoper, Vladimir Jurowski, Barrie Kosky (Bayerische Staatsoper Recordings BSOREC 1005)
- Video: Performance & Documentaries: Living Bach, Bach players and singers around the world; Anna Schmidt (Weltkino 4061229402200)

== 2026 ==
ICMA Jury has nominated 307 audio and video productions.

=== 2026 awards ===
- Lifetime Achievement Award: Stephen Kovacevich
- Artist of the Year: Jakub Hrůša
- Young artist of the Year: Anja Mittermüller (mezzo soprano)
- Discovery Award: Mariam Abouzahra (violinist)
- ICMA Classeek Award: Anthony Ratinov (pianist)
- Composer Award: Péter Zombola
- Label of the Year: LSO Live
- Special Achievement Award: Carlos Païta / Le Palais des Dégustateurs (label), Bamberg Symphony
- Early Music: Maria – Josquin in Leipzig; Amarcord (Raumklang RK AP 10124)
- Baroque Instrumental: Johann Sebastian Bach: Sonatas for Violin and Continuo; Isabelle Faust, Kristian Bezuidenhout, Kristin von der Goltz (Harmonia Mundi HMM 902698)
- Baroque Vocal: Songs of Passion, John Dowland & Henry Purcell: Various works; Lea Desandre, Thomas Dunford, Jupiter Ensemble (Erato 2173282845)
- Vocal Music: Gaetano Donizetti: Songs; Ermonela Jaho, Carlo Rizzi (Opera Rara ORR 258)
- Choral Music: Joseph Haydn: Die Schöpfung; Lucy Crowe, Benjamin Bruns, Christian Gerhaher, Chor & Symphonieorchester des Bayerischen Rundfunks, Simon Rattle (BR Klassik 900221)
- Opera: Richard Wagner: Der fliegende Holländer; Lise Davidsen, Anna Kissjudit, Stanislas de Barbeyrac, Eirik Grøtvedt, Gerald Finley, Brindley Sherratt, Norwegian National Opera Chorus, Norwegian National Opera Orchestra, Edward Gardner (Decca 4870952)
- Solo Instrument: John Field: Complete Nocturnes; Alice Sara Ott (Deutsche Grammophon 4866239)
- Chamber Music: Bohuslav Martinů, String Quartets Nos. 2, 3, 5 & 7; Pavel Haas Quartet (Supraphon SU43682)
- Concertos: War Silence – Rare Italian Piano Concertos, Fano, Dallapiccola, Omizzolo, Carrara: Piano Concertos; Roberto Prosseda, London Philharmonic Orchestra, Nir Kabaretti (Hyperion CDA68458)
- Symphonic Music: Gustav Mahler: Symphony No. 5; Tonhalle-Orchester Zürich, Paavo Järvi (Alpha Classics 1127)
- Contemporary Music: Kalevi Aho: Moonlight Concerto – Concerto For Alto Flute & Strings; Hiyoli Togawa, Alexej Gerassimez, Sharon Bezaly, Lahti Symphony Orchestra, St. Michel Strings, Anja Bihlmaier, Erkki Lasonpalo (BIS 2626)
- Assorted Programs: Schönberg: Die Jakobsleiter, Kammersymphonie No. 1, Violin Concerto, Variations for Orchestra, Verklärte Nacht; Patricia Kopatchinskaja, Wolfgang Koch, Daniel Behle, Wolfgang Ablinger-Sperrhacke, Johannes Martin Kränzle, Gyula Orendt, Stephan Rügamer, Nicola Beller Carbone, Liv Redpath, Jasmin Delfs, Berlin Radio Choir, Berlin Philharmonic, David Bui, Gregor Mayrhofer, Giuseppe Mentuccia, Friedrich Suckel, Kirill Petrenko (Berliner Philharmoniker Recordings BPHR 250511)
- Historical Recordings: Sergio Fiorentino – The Legacy; Various composers, Sergio Fiorentino, Guildford Philharmonic Orchestra, Pro Musica Symphony Orchestra Hamburg, London Mozart Ensemble (Brilliant Classics 97423)
- Premiere Recordings: Ernst Gernot Klussmann: Piano Quintet Op. 1 + String Quartet No. 1; Kuss Quartett, Peter Nagy (EDA Records EDA55)
- Premiere Recordings: Shostakovich Discoveries: World Premiere Recordings & Rarities; Daniil Trifonov, Gidon Kremer, Nils Mönkemeyer, Alexander Roslavets, Yulianna Avdeeva, Rostislav Krimer, Madara Petersone, Georgijs Osokins, Daniel Ciobanu, Alexei Mochalov, Andrei Pushkarev, Andrei Korobeinikov, Kremerata Baltica, Staatskapelle Dresden, Thomas Sanderling (Deutsche Grammophon 4867190)
- Video: Opera: Sergei Prokofiev: War and Peace; Olga Kulchynska, Andrei Zhilikovsky, Violeta Urmana, Olga Guryakova, Mischa Schelomianski, Arsen Soghomonyan et al., Chor und Orchester der Bayerischen Staatsoper, Vladimir Jurowski (Bayerische Staatsoper Recordings BSOREC 1006)
- Video: Performance & Documentaries: Anton Bruckner: Symphony No. 9; Bamberg Symphony, Herbert Blomstedt (Accentus Music ACC20661)
- Video: Performance & Documentaries: The Alchemy of the Piano, A Film by Jan Schmidt-Garre; Francesco Piemontesi, Alfred Brendel, Ermonela Jaho, Stephen Kovacevich, Antonio Pappano, Maria João Pires, Eldar Nebolsin et al. (Naxos 2.110778)

== Predecessors ==
=== Cannes Classical Awards ===
Cannes Classical Awards (CCA) were music awards awarded at the Marché international du disque et de l'édition musicale (MIDEM) international music convention in Cannes, France, in January from 1994 until 2004.

The original chairman of the awards was the New York music critic David Hurwitz. Voting was conducted by a multinational jury of several hundred music critics from magazines including Hurwitz' ClassicsToday.com website, Crescendo (Belgium), Répertoire (France), Pizzicato (Luxemburg), Klassik Heute (Germany), Scherzo (Spain), Musica (Italy) etc.

==== 2000 ====
- Lifetime Achievement: Sir Charles Mackerras
- The Emile Berliner Memorial Award for Lifetime Achievement as Producer: Klaus Hiemann (Deutsche Grammophon)
- Living Composer: Krzysztof Penderecki, Credo; Oregon Bach Festival Orchestra and Chorus, Helmuth Rilling (Hänssler 98.311)
- Best Label: Hänssler
- Record of the Year: Andreas Staier, Variations on Fandango (Teldec 3984 21468-2)

==== 2001 ====
- Lifetime Achievement: Galina Vishnevskaya, Mstislav Rostropovich, Alfred Brendel
- The Emile Berliner Memorial Prize for Lifetime Achievement: Max Wilcox (Producer)
- Living Composer: Hans Werner Henze
- Record of the Year: Beethoven: 9 Symphonies; Daniel Barenboim (Teldec 3984-25254-2)

==== 2002 ====
- Lifetime Achievement: Michael Gielen, Ivan Moravec, Robert Craft
- The Emile Berliner Memorial Award for Lifetime Achievement as Producer: Christopher Raeburn
- Living Composer: Poul Ruders, The Handmaid’s Tale (Da Capo 8.412265.66)
- Young Artist: James Ehnes (violinist), BACH: Sonatas and Partitas (Analekta 2 3147-8)
- Record of the Year: PIERNE : Cydalise et le Chevrepied; David Shallon (Timpani 1 C1059)

==== 2003 ====
- Lifetime Achievement for Fostering Young Talent: Monsterrat Caballé
- Living Composer: Sofia Gubaidulina
- Young Artist: Sharon Bezaly (flutist)
- Record of the Year: Shostakovich: Complete Symphonies; Rudolf Barshai (Brilliant Classics)

==== 2004 ====
- Lifetime Achievement Awards: Régine Crespin, Zoltan Kocsis, Claudio Abbado, Robert von Bahr: 30 Years of BIS
- Living Composer Award: Peter Eötvös, Vocal Works (BMC CD 038)
- Disc of the Year: Vasks: Symphony No. 2; Violin Concerto. Tampere Philharmonic Orchestra/Ostrobothnian Chamber Orchestra/John Storgårds/Kangas (Ondine ODE 1005-2)

=== MIDEM Classical Awards ===
MIDEM Classical Awards succeeded CCA in 2005 and were held until 2010.

In 2011, the awards were replaced with the International Classical Music Awards (ICMA), which were first awarded in Tampere, Finland on April 6.
