= Salome discography =

This is a list of audio and video recordings (discography) of Richard Strauss' 1905 German opera Salome.

== Audio recordings ==
| Year | Cast: (Salome, Jochanaan, Herodes, Herodias, Narraboth) | Conductor, Opera house and orchestra | Label |
|---|---|---|---|
| 1947 | Maria Cebotari, Marko Rothmüller, Julius Patzak, Elisabeth Höngen, Karl Friedrich | Clemens Krauss, Vienna Philharmonic (Live performance by Vienna State Opera at the Royal Opera House, Covent Garden on 30 September) | CD: Gebhardt; Cat: JGCD 0011 |
| 1949 | Ljuba Welitsch, Herbert Janssen, Frederick Jagel, Kerstin Thorborg, Brian Sullivan | Fritz Reiner; Metropolitan Opera House Orchestra (Live performance the Metropolitan Opera House on 12 March) | CD: Gebhardt; Cat: JGCD 0013 |
| 1951 | Inge Borkh, Hans Hotter, Max Lorenz, Irmgard Barth, Lorenz Fehenberger | Joseph Keilberth; Bavarian State Orchestra | CD: Cantus Classics; Cat: 500705 |
| 1952 | Inge Borkh, Ferdinand Frantz, Max Lorenz, Margarete Klose, Franz Fehringer | Karl Schröder; Sinfonieorchester des Hessischen Rundfunks | CD: Myto; Cat: 00211 |
| 1952 | Ljuba Welitsch, Hans Hotter, Set Svanholm, Elisabeth Höngen, Brian Sullivan | Fritz Reiner, Metropolitan Opera (Recording of a performance at the MET, 19 January) | CD: Walhall; Cat: WLCD 0201 |
| 1955 | Christel Goltz, Paul Schöffler, Ramón Vinay, Blanche Thebom, Brian Sullivan | Dimitri Mitropoulos, Metropolitan Opera Orchestra (Recording 8 January) | CD: Walhall; Cat: WLCD 143 |
| 1958 | Montserrat Caballé, Alexander Welitsch, Zbyslaw Wozniak, Sabine Zimmer, Karl Brock | Silvio Varviso, Orchester und Chor des Opernhaus Basel (Recording Basel, January) | CD: Gala; Cat: GL 100.799 |
| 1961 | Birgit Nilsson, Eberhard Wächter, Gerhard Stolze, Grace Hoffman, Waldemar Kmentt | Georg Solti; Vienna Philharmonic | CD: Decca; Cat: 475 7528; 000692102 (USA) |
| 1969 | Montserrat Caballé, Sherrill Milnes, Richard Lewis, Regina Resnik, James King | Erich Leinsdorf; London Symphony Orchestra | CD: RCA Red Seal; Cat: 88843058482 (2) |
| 1970 | Gwyneth Jones, Dietrich Fischer-Dieskau, Richard Cassilly, Mignon Dunn, Wiesław Ochman | Karl Böhm; Orchestra of the Hamburg State Opera/Hamburgischen Staatsoper (Recording of a performance at the Hamburg State Opera, 4 November) | CD: Deutsche Grammophon; Cat: 445 319-2 |
| 1972 | Leonie Rysanek, Eberhard Wächter, Hans Hopf, Grace Hoffman, Waldemar Kmentt | Karl Böhm; Vienna Philharmonic/Wiener Staatsoper (Recording of a performance at the Vienna State Opera, 22 December) | CD: Opera d'Oro; Cat: OPD 7004 |
| 1977 | Hildegard Behrens, José van Dam, Karl-Walter Böhm, Agnes Baltsa, Wiesław Ochman | Herbert von Karajan; Vienna Philharmonic (Recording of a performance at the Salzburg Festival, 26 July) | CD: Celestial Audio; Cat: CA 645 |
| 1990 | Jessye Norman, James Morris, Walter Raffeiner, Kerstin Witt, Richard Leech | Seiji Ozawa; Staatskapelle Dresden | CD: Philips; Cat: 432 153-2 |
| 1991 | Karen Huffstodt, José van Dam, Jean Dupouy, Hélène Jossoud, Jean-Luc Viala | Kent Nagano; Opera de Lyon Orchestra (A recording of the French version) | CD: Virgin Classics; Cat: VCD7 91477-2 |
| 1994 | Catherine Malfitano, Bryn Terfel, Kenneth Riegel, Hanna Schwarz, Kim Begley | Christoph von Dohnányi; Vienna Philharmonic | CD: Decca; Cat: 478 3241 |
| 1999 | Inga Nielsen, Robert Hale, Reiner Goldberg, Anja Silja, Deon van der Walt | Michael Schønwandt, Danish National Symphony Orchestra | Chandos, 2 CDs; Cat: CHAN9611 |
| 2017 | Emily Magee, Wolfgang Koch, Peter Bronder, Michaela Schuster, Benjamin Bruns | Frankfurt Radio Symphony; Conductor: Andrés Orozco-Estrada | CD: Pentatone; Cat: PTC 5186602 |

== Video recordings ==
| Year | Cast: (Salome, Jochanaan, Herodes, Herodias, Narraboth) | Conductor, Opera house and orchestra (production details) | Label |
|---|---|---|---|
| 1974 | Teresa Stratas, Bernd Weikl, Hans Hopf, Astrid Varnay, Wiesław Ochman | Karl Böhm, Vienna Philharmonic | DVD: Deutsche Grammophon; Cat: DG 000907209 |
| 1991 | Catherine Malfitano, Simon Estes, Horst Hiestermann, Leonie Rysanek, Clemens Bieber | Giuseppe Sinopoli, Orchestra Deutsche Oper Berlin (Stage director: Petr Weigl, Video director: Brian Large) | DVD: Warner Music Vision; Cat: 9031-73827-2 |
| 1992 | Maria Ewing, Michael Devlin, Kenneth Riegel, Gillian Knight, Robin Leggate | Edward Downes, Royal Opera Chorus & The Orchestra of the Royal Opera House | DVD: Opus Arte; Cat: OAR3108D |
| 1997 | Catherine Malfitano, Bryn Terfel, Kenneth Riegel, Anja Silja, Robert Gambill | Christoph von Dohnányi, Orchestra of the Royal Opera House Covent Garden | DVD: Decca; Cat: 074105-9 |
| 2007 | Nadja Michael, Falk Struckmann, Peter Bronder, Iris Vermillon, Matthias Klink | Daniel Harding, Orchestra of the Teatro alla Scala | DVD: TDK; Cat: DVWW-OPSALOME |
| 2008 | Nadja Michael, Michael Volle, Thomas Moser, Michaela Schuster, Joseph Kaiser | Philippe Jordan, Orchestra of the Royal Opera House (Director: David McVicar; recording of performances at the Royal Opera House on 3, 6, 8 March | DVD: Opus Arte OA0996D |
| 2008 | Karita Mattila, Juha Uusitalo, Kim Begley, Ildikó Komlósi, Joseph Kaiser | Patrick Summers, Metropolitan Opera Orchestra and Chorus (Production: Jürgen Flimm; Designer: Santo Loquasto; recorded live, 11 October) | DVD: Sony Masterworks; HD video: Met Opera on Demand |
| 2009 | Nina Stemme, Mark Delavan, Robert Brubaker, Jane Henschel, Stefan Heibach | Michael Boder, Gran Teatre del Liceu Orchestra and Chorus (Production: Guy Joosten; Set Designer: Martin Zehetgruber; Costume Designer: Heide Kastler; Lighting Designer: Manfred Voss) | Canal clàssic Òpera |
| 2010 | Erika Sunnegårdh, Mark S. Doss, Robert Brubaker, Dalia Schaechter, Mark Milhofer | Nicola Luisotti, Teatro Comunale di Bologna Orchestra and Chorus (Production: Gabriele Lavia; Set Designer: Alessandro Camera; Costume Designer: Andrea Viotti; Lighting Designer: Daniele Naldi; Choreographer: Sara di Salvo) | La Musica di Raitre |
| 2011 | Angela Denoke, Alan Held, Kim Begley, Doris Soffel, Marcel Reijans | Stefan Soltész, Deutsches Symphonie-Orchester Berlin (Director: Nikolaus Lehnhoff) | DVD: Arthaus 101593 |
| 2018 | Asmik Grigorian, Gábor Bretz, John Daszak, Anna Maria Chiuri, Julian Prégardien | Franz Welser-Möst, Vienna Philharmonic (Production designer and stage director: Romeo Castellucci; recorded live, Felsenreitschule, Salzburg Festival, 24, 26, 28 July) | DVD/Blu-ray: Unitel/C-Major |
| 2021 | Elena Stikhina, Wolfgang Koch, Gerhard Siegel, Linda Walton, Attilio Glaser | Riccardo Chailly, Teatro alla Scala Orchestra and Chorus (Production: Damiano Michieletto; Set Designer: Paolo Fantin; Costume Designer: Carla Teti; Lighting Designer: Alessandro Carletti; Choreographer: Thomas Wilhelm) | Rai Italia |
| 2022 | Elza van den Heever, Iain Paterson, John Daszak, Karita Mattila, Tansel Akzeybek | Simone Young, Opéra National de Paris Orchestra and Chorus (Production: Lydia Steier; Set Designer: Momme Hinrichs; Costume Designer: Andy Besuch; Lighting Designer: Olaf Freese) | Telmondis |
| 2023 | Asmik Grigorian, Kyle Ketelsen, John Daszak, Violeta Urmana, Oleksiy Palchykov | Kent Nagano, Hamburg State Opera Orchestra and Chorus (Production and Set Designer: Dmitri Tcherniakov; Costume Designer: Elena Zaitseva; Lighting Designer: Gleb Filshtinsky) | ARTE Concert |
| 2025 | Summer Hassan, Nathaniel Sullivan, Patrick Cook, Manna K. Jones, David Morgans | Jacob Ashworth (Production: Elizabeth Dinkova; Set Designer: Emona Stoykova; Costume Designer: Mika Eubanks; Lighting Designer: Emma Deane; Choreographer: Emma Jaster) | Heartbeat Opera |
| 2025 | Elza van den Heever, Peter Mattei, Gerhard Siegel, Michelle DeYoung, Piotr Buszewski | Yannick Nézet-Séguin, Metropolitan Opera Orchestra and Chorus (Production: Claus Guth; recorded live, 17 May) | HD video: Met Opera on Demand |
