= Pipalkot, Dailekh =

Pipalkot पीपलकोट
- Village development committee
- Location in Nepal
- Coordinates: 29.09°N 81.54°E
- Country: Nepal
- Zone: Bheri Zone
- District: Dailekh District

Population (1991)
  - Total: 1,876
- Time zone: UTC+5:45 (Nepal Time)

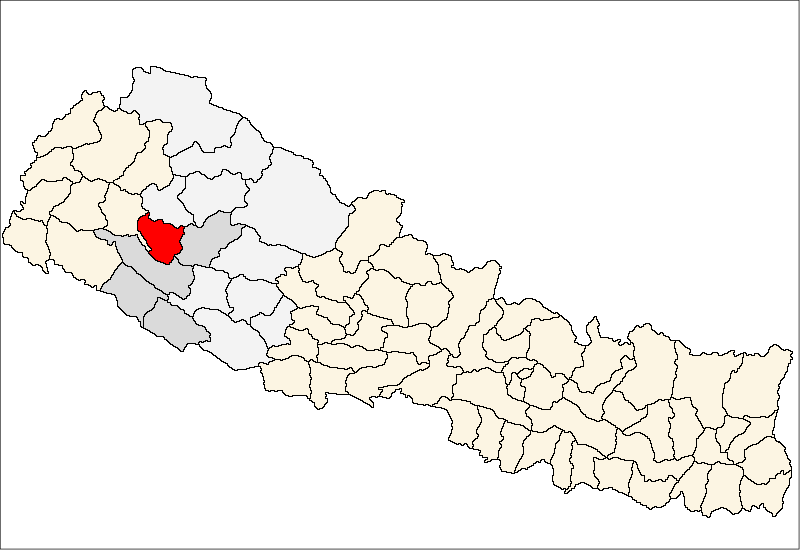
Dailekh district

Pipalkot is a village development committee in Dailekh District in the Bheri Zone of mid western region Nepal. At the time of the 1991 Nepal census it had a population of 1876 people living in 318 individual households.

== Villages of Pipalkot ==
There are many villages at Pipalkot VDC. Some villages' names are as following:

1. Tolichakha
2. Chiuri
3. Patemela
4. Gorkhi
5. Laypatal
6. Kitu
7. Jamnepani
8. Sugarkhal
9. Killahanna
