= Daszak =

Daszak is a surname. Notable people with the surname include:

- John Daszak, British operatic tenor
- Peter Daszak, British zoologist
