= Chouchane Siranossian =

French violinist (born 1984)

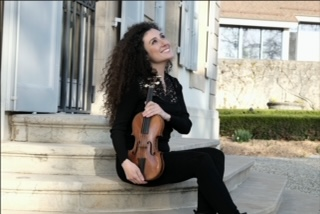

Background information
- Born: 18 July 1984 (age 42); Romans-sur-Isère, France
- Genres: classical, baroque
- Instrument: violin
- Website: www.chouchane-siranossian.com/en

Chouchane Siranossian (born 1984) is a French violinist.

Chouchane Siranossian was born in France of an Armenian family. Her father, Alexandre Siranossian, is an expert in Armenian music. The cellist Astrig Siranossian is her sister. She began studying the violin with the Hungarian-born violinist and conductor Tibor Varga. After finishing her training with Zakhar Bron in Zurich she became concertmaster of the St Gallen Symphony Orchestra. A few years later she met the early music specialist Reinhard Goebel and began playing the baroque violin.

She received International Classical Music Awards in 2017, 2019 and 2021.

Of Siranossian's improvisation on Havun, Havun ("The Bird Was Awake") by the 10th-century Armenian mystic Krikor Naregatsi, the music critic Fiona Maddocks wrote in The Guardian: "Here was infinity in the palm of Siranossian’s hand, eternity in a metropolitan lunch hour."
