= Saò Soulez-Larivière =

French violist (born 1998)

Saò Soulez-Larivière (born 1998) is a French violinist. He won the 2023 ICMA young artist award and the first prize at the Prague Spring International Competition of the same year.
