= Tolichaka =

Coordinates: 29°05′N 81°31′E

Tolichaka is a village of Pipalkot VDC Dailekh District western Nepal. Tolichaka is the main village of Pipalkot VDC. There are 940 people live in Tolichaka.

== See also ==
- Palkot
- Dailekh District
