= Théotime Langlois de Swarte =

French violinist

Langlois de Swarte playing Dido and Æneas (Henry Purcell) with Les Arts Florissants in 2022.

Théotime Langlois de Swarte (born 11 November 1995) is a French violinist. His repertoire includes Bach, Vivaldi and other Baroque music composers.

He was born in Céret and began playing violin at the age of four. He trained at the Conservatoire de Perpignan, and later at the Conservatoire de Toulouse, under Gilles Colliard. He was a nominee in the category New Talents at the Victoires de la Musique in 2020, being the first baroque violinist ever nominated for that award.

Langlois de Swarte and Le Consort appeared at the BBC Proms for the first time in 2025, performing pieces by Vivaldi, Bach and other composers.

He plays a 1665 Jacob Stainer violin owned by the Jumpstart Jr Foundation, a Dutch nonprofit that loans instruments to young artists.

== Recordings ==
- 2020: The Mad Lover; with Thomas Dunford (Harmonia Mundi)
- 2021: A concert at the time of Proust; with Tanguy de Williencourt (Harmonia Mundi)
- 2021: "Générations" Senaillé; Leclair: Sonates pour violon and clavecin with William Christie (Harmonia Mundi)
- 2022: Vivaldi, Leclair & Locatelli: Violin Concertos - Ensemble Les Ombres (Harmonia Mundi) Diapason d'Or 2022
- 2023: Une invitation chez les Schumann. Musique de chambre, œuvres pour piano et lieder - Trio Dichter (with Hanna Salzenstein, Fiona Mato), Samuel Hasselhorn (Harmonia Mundi)
- 2023: Joseph Haydn Symphonies "parisiennes" n° 84, 85, 86 & 87 - Concerto pour violon n° 1 - Les Arts Florissants, with William Christie (Harmonia Mundi)
