= Chiuri =

Chiuri is an Italian surname. Notable people with the surname include:

- Anna Maria Chiuri (born 1968), Italian mezzo-soprano
- Maria Grazia Chiuri (born 1964), Italian fashion designer

== See also ==
- Diploknema butyracea
