= Polish Sinfonia Iuventus Orchestra =

National youth orchestra of Poland

Jerzy Semkow Polish Sinfonia Iuventus Orchestra
- Youth orchestra
- Founded: 2007
- Location: Warsaw, Poland
- Principal conductor: Piotr Baron
- Website: sinfoniaiuventus.pl

The Jerzy Semkow Polish Sinfonia Iuventus Orchestra (Polish: Polska Orkiestra Sinfonia Iuventus im. Jerzego Semkowa) is the national youth orchestra of Poland. It was established in 2007 on the initiative of Jerzy Semkow by the Ministry of Culture and National Heritage. It is composed of young musicians under 30 years of age.

It has worked with conductors including Jerzy Semkow, Kazimierz Kord, Jan Krenz, Krzysztof Penderecki, Antoni Wit, John Axelrod, Charles Dutoit, Agnieszka Duczmal, Juozas Domarkas, Grzegorz Nowak, Jerzy Maksymiuk, Michail Jurowski, Andrey Boreyko, Gerd Schaller, Eugene Tzigane, and soloists including Konstanty Andrzej Kulka, Piotr Paleczny, Ivan Monighetti, Zakhar Bron, Aleksandra Kurzak, Roberto Alagna, Janusz Olejniczak, Jonathan Plowright, Abdel Rahman El Bacha, Eugen Indjic, Krzysztof Jabłoński, Jadwiga Rappé, Vadim Repin, Jan Stanienda, Alena Baeva, Leszek Możdżer, Yulianna Avdeeva, Agata Szymczewska and Łukasz Kuropaczewski.

The orchestra is a member of the European Federation of National Youth Orchestras.
