= Gorkhi =

Coordinates: 29°04′N 81°31′E

Gorkhi गोर्खी पीपलकोट is a village of Pipalkot VDC. Gorkhi is the ward NO.8 village. The population of the village is 630, in 103 households.

Gorkhi is a remote village of the Dailekh District.

== See also ==
- Pipalkot VDC
- Dailekh District
