= Karola Theill =

German classical woman pianist

Karola Theill is a German pianist and Lied accompanist.

== Early life an career ==
Born in Cologne, she grew up in a musical family. Her father, Gustav Adolf Theill was a part-time musicologist. She studied at the Hochschule für Musik und Theater Hamburg, with Shoshana Cohen in Jerusalem, at the Universität der Künste Berlin and at Indiana University, School of Music in Bloomington. She attended Lied courses with Aribert Reimann and was invited for several years to accompany Dietrich Fischer-Dieskau in his lessons.

Theill gives concerts in Germany, e.g. at the Berliner Festwochen, the Schleswig-Holstein Musik Festival, the Internationale Maifestspiele, the Moselfestwochen, the Kasseler Musiktage, as well as in other European countries (e.g. Musikverein Vienna, Opéra Bastille, Paris), in Israel and the USA. Her Lied partners include Dietrich Fischer-Dieskau, Benjamin Bruns, Angela Denoke, Matthias Goerne, Bettina Jensen, Carola Höhn, Klaus Häger, Thomas Mohr, Silvia Weiss. She is also a member of the ensemble "liedtrio".

Theill teaches as honorary professor at the Hochschule für Musik "Hanns Eisler" and supervises a Lied class at the Rostock University of Music and Theatre. She also gives regular master classes in Berlin, Hamburg, at the Akademii Muzycznej in Poznań, the Conservatorio di Musica in Alessandria, the Jerusalem Academy of Music and Dance and the University of California.
