= Gustav Adolf Theill =

German composer and musicologist (b. 1924, d. 1997)

Gustav Adolf Theill (7 February 1924 – 29 November 1997) was a German composer and musicologist.

== Life ==
Theill was born in Remscheid as son of the factory owner Gustav Theill and his wife Auguste. In his pietist parents' house, which was very much influenced by and committed to the Confessing Church, he came into contact with Protestant church music at an early age. The Evangelical Church enabled him to train as a part-time Church musician. In the early 1960s, he held a post as church musician at a church in Cologne-Ostheim. His special love was the music of Johann Sebastian Bach. He later dealt with Bach's works in his musicological writings, and the tonal language of his compositions was based on the harmonies of Felix Mendelssohn Bartholdy and Max Reger. He attracted particular attention with the reconstruction of works by Johann Sebastian Bach that were lost or only preserved as fragments. His most important work in this respect has become the reconstruction and completion of Bach's St Mark Passion. Theill earned his living as an alternative practitioner in Cologne, where he ran a practice and from 1971 to 1980 also, the Cologne spa. Among his six children are his daughter Karola Theill, who lives as a pianist in Berlin, and his son, the musicologist Hans-Joachim Theill.

Theill died in Cologne at the age of 73.

== Publications ==
- Die Markuspassion von Joh. Seb. Bach (BWV 247)
- Die Symbolik der Singstimmen
- Beiträge zur Symbolsprache Johann Sebastian Bachs''.

== Recording ==
- Markuspassion (Johanneskantorei Köln-Klettenberg, Ltg. Gerda Schaarwächter)

== Compositions ==
- Die Seligpreisungen (1947)
- Mitten wir im Leben sind
- Gründonnerstags-Kyrie
- diverse Choralbearbeitungen für Orgel
- Der Maler
- Markuspassion (Rekonstruktion und Ergänzung)
