= Lea Desandre =

French-Italian opera singer (born 1993)

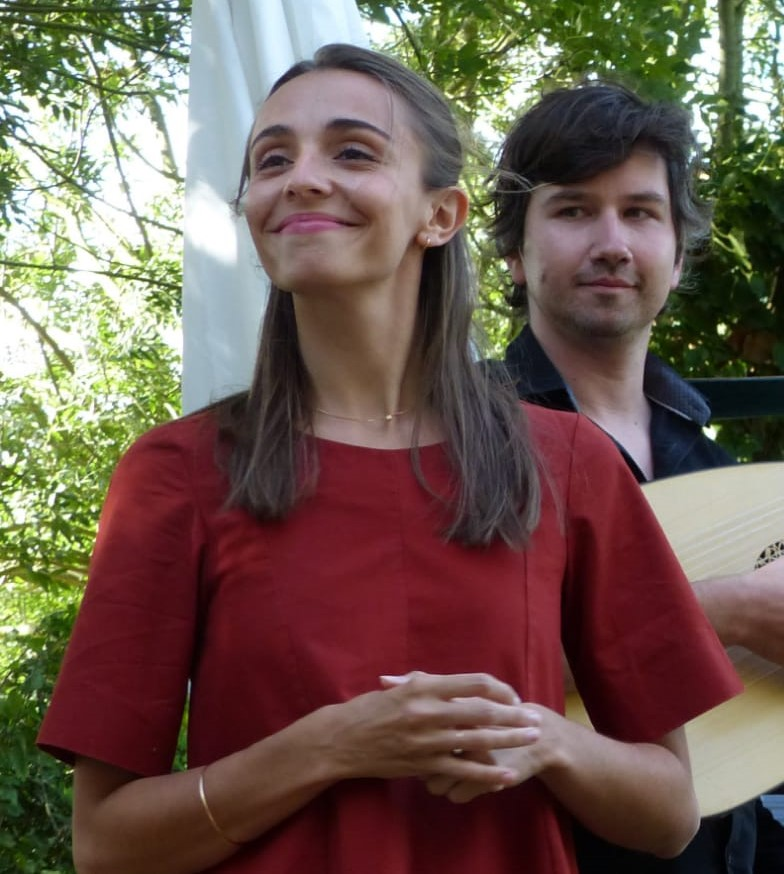
- Desandre in 2020 with lutenist Thomas Dunford
- Born: 1993 (age 32–33)
- Occupation: Opera singer
- Website: www.leadesandre.com

Lea Desandre (born 1993) is a French-Italian operatic mezzo-soprano.

== Biography ==
Lea Desandre performs Henry Purcell's Dido and Aeneas with Les Arts Florissants in 2020

Desandre was born in 1993 to a French father and an Italian mother. Desandre trained in dance as a child, and she joined the children's choir of the Opéra national de Paris at the age of twelve. She later moved to Venice to train under Sara Mingardo. Desandre joined William Christie's Jardin des Voix in 2015. She performed at the Aix-en-Provence Festival in 2016, and she made her debut at the Salzburg Festival in 2018.

Desandre is noted for her performances of Baroque music, with The New York Times writing in 2022 that she "has established herself as one of today’s most exciting voices in early-music performance". Since 2015, Desandre's roles have included Urbain in Les Huguenots, Rosina in The Barber of Seville, Annio in La clemenza di Tito, Sesto in Giulio Cesare, Dido in Dido and Aeneas, La Messaggera in L'Orfeo, and Flerida in Erismena. Desandre also performs chamber music, including regular appearances with lutenist Thomas Dunford and his Jupiter Ensemble.

== Awards ==
- Chevalier of the Ordre des Arts et des Lettres (2020)
