= Andrea Bacchetti (musician) =

Italian pianist (born 1977)

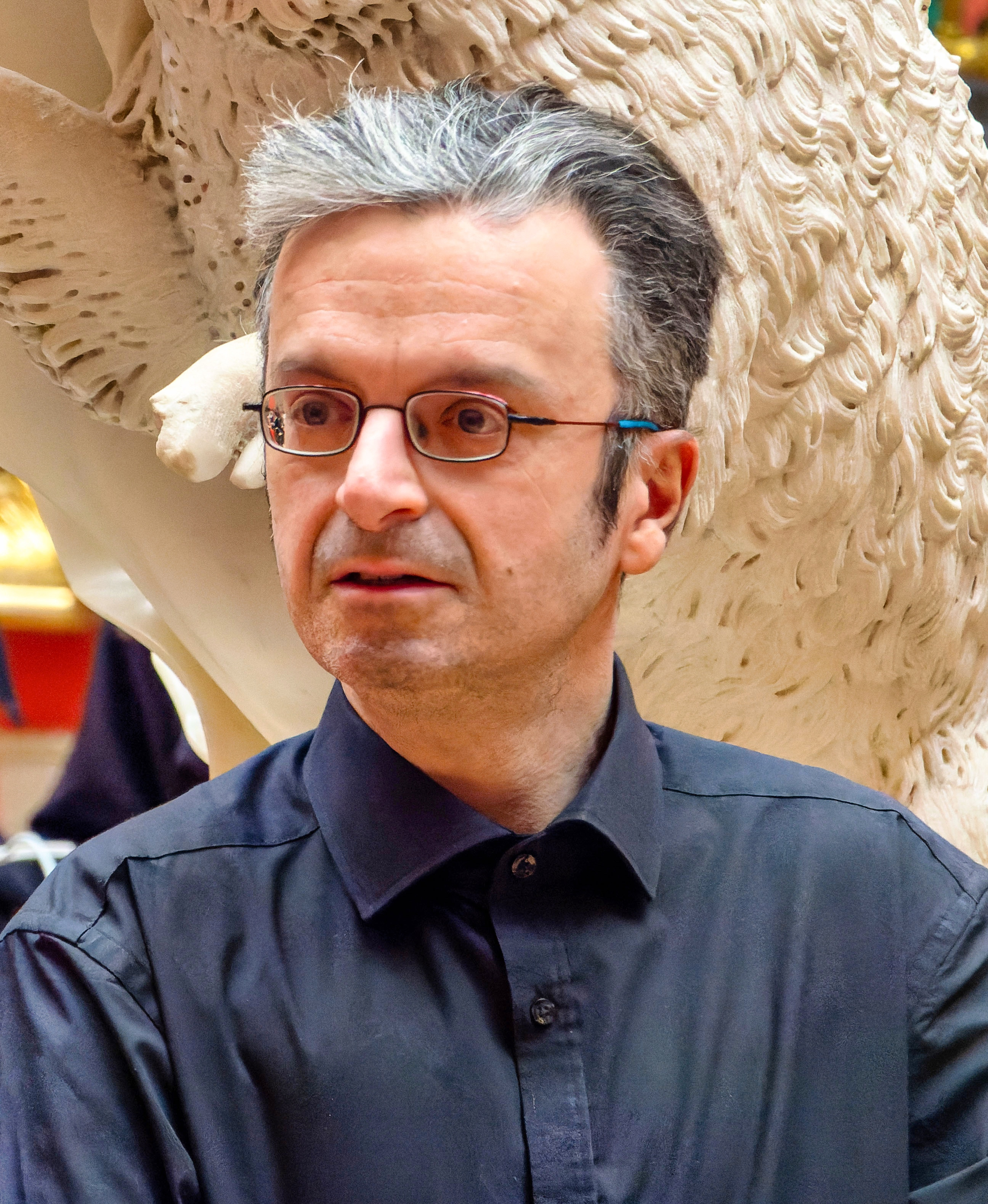

Andrea Bacchetti (born 1977) is an Italian pianist.

At 11 years old he debuted with I Solisti Veneti, conducted by Claudio Scimone.

He is a member of music festival in Lucerne, Salisbury etc.

In his discography, there are RCA Red Seal CDs with works by Johann Sebastian Bach, Johann Adolph Hasse, Luigi Cherubini, Wolfgang Amadeus Mozart. Prize International Classical Music Awards as Baroque Instrumental for CD with the works by Domenico Scarlatti and Antonio Soler. Andrea Bacchetti recorded CD with the works by Luciano Berio for Decca.
