= Jerzy Semkow =

Polish conductor (1928–2014)

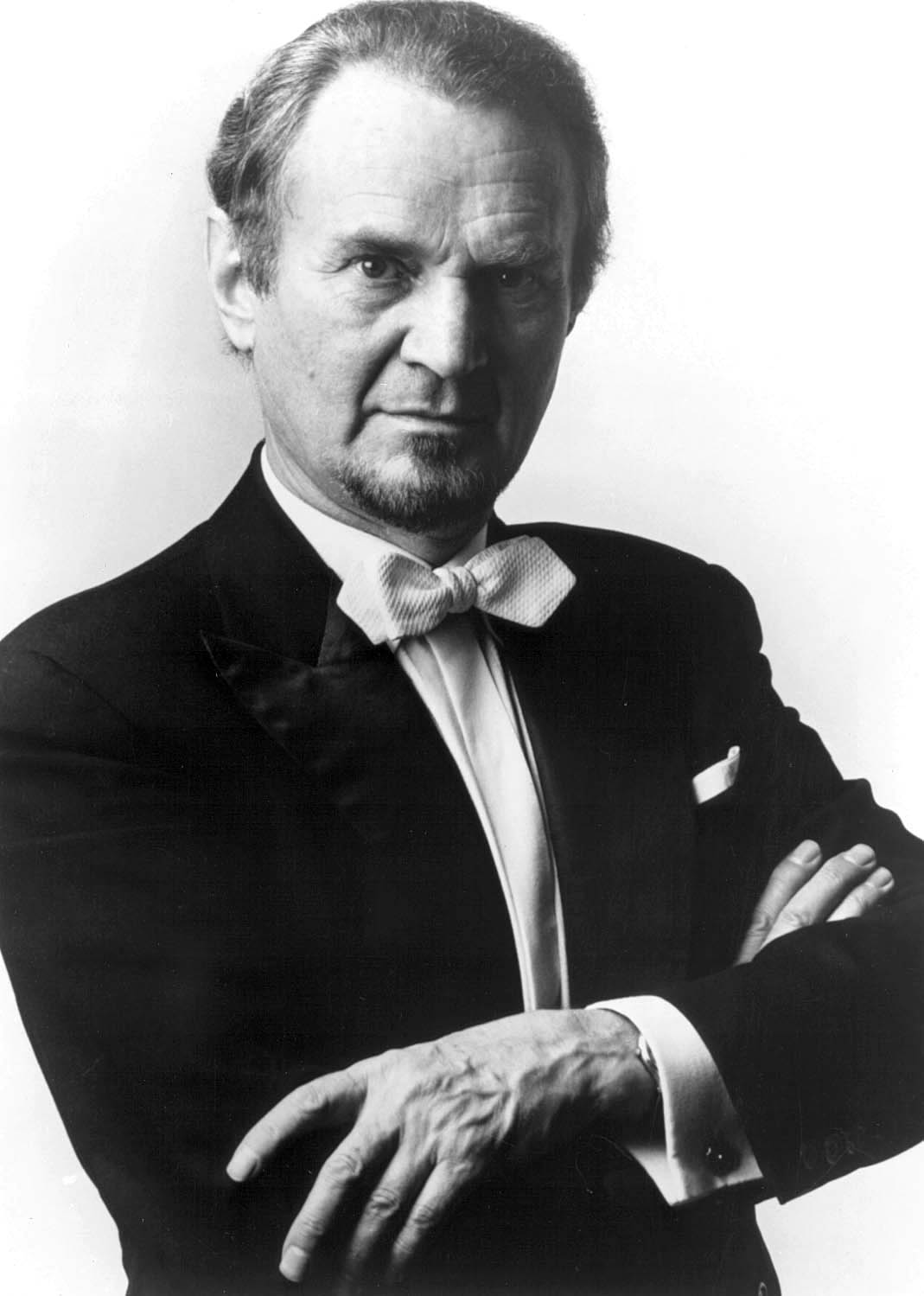
- Born: 12 October 1928; Radomsko, Łódź Voivodeship, Poland
- Died: 23 December 2014 (aged 86); Lausanne, Vaud, Switzerland
- Occupations: Conductor; music educator
- Years active: 1950s–2000s
- Employer: See list of orchestras: Leningrad Philharmonic Orchestra; Warsaw National Opera; Royal Danish Opera; Royal Danish Orchestra; RAI National Symphony Orchestra; St. Louis Symphony Orchestra; Rochester Philharmonic Orchestra; Detroit Symphony Orchestra; University of Colorado; Yale University; Manhattan School of Music
- Style: Classical
- Awards: Ordre des Arts et des Lettres

Jerzy Semkow (12 October 1928 – 23 December 2014) was a Polish conductor.

== Biography ==
Semkow, c. 1962

Semkow was born in Radomsko, Poland, but later took French citizenship and resided in Paris. He studied in Kraków and Leningrad. His conducting mentors included Erich Kleiber, Bruno Walter and Tullio Serafin. He was an assistant conductor with Yevgeny Mravinsky with the Leningrad Philharmonic Orchestra.

Semkow held posts as artistic director (1958–59) and principal conductor (1959–62) of the National Opera in Warsaw, principal conductor of the Royal Danish Opera and the Royal Danish Orchestra in Copenhagen (1966–76), as well as music director of the Orchestra of Radio-Televisione Italiana (RAI) in Rome. In the US, Semkow served as music director of the St. Louis Symphony Orchestra (1975–79), and as music advisor and principal conductor of the Rochester Philharmonic (1985–89). He was a regular guest conductor of the National Philharmonic in Warsaw and of the Detroit Symphony Orchestra over a 40-year period, including guest appearances over 24 consecutive seasons from 1986 to 2009.

Semkow lectured on music at the University of Colorado and conducted master classes at Yale University and New York's Manhattan School of Music. He recorded commercially with the St. Louis Symphony Orchestra for the Vox/Turnabout label.

He was awarded the French Ordre des Arts et des Lettres (2000) and received honorary doctorates from the Chopin University of Music (2005) and the Łódź Music Academy (2013).

Semkow died near Lausanne, Switzerland, on 23 December 2014, aged 86. His biography was published the same year, authored by Małgorzata Komorowska.
