= Sugarkhal =

Sugarkhal सुगरखाल
- Village development committee
- Location in Nepal
- Coordinates: 28.79°N 81.13°E
- Country: Nepal
- Zone: Seti Zone
- District: Kailali District

Population (1991)
  - Total: 9,599
- Time zone: UTC+5:45 (Nepal Time)

Sugarkhal is a village development committee in Kailali District in the Seti Zone of western Nepal. At the time of the 1991 Nepal census it had a population of 9599 living in 1634 individual households.
