= Benjamin Bruns =

German operatic tenor

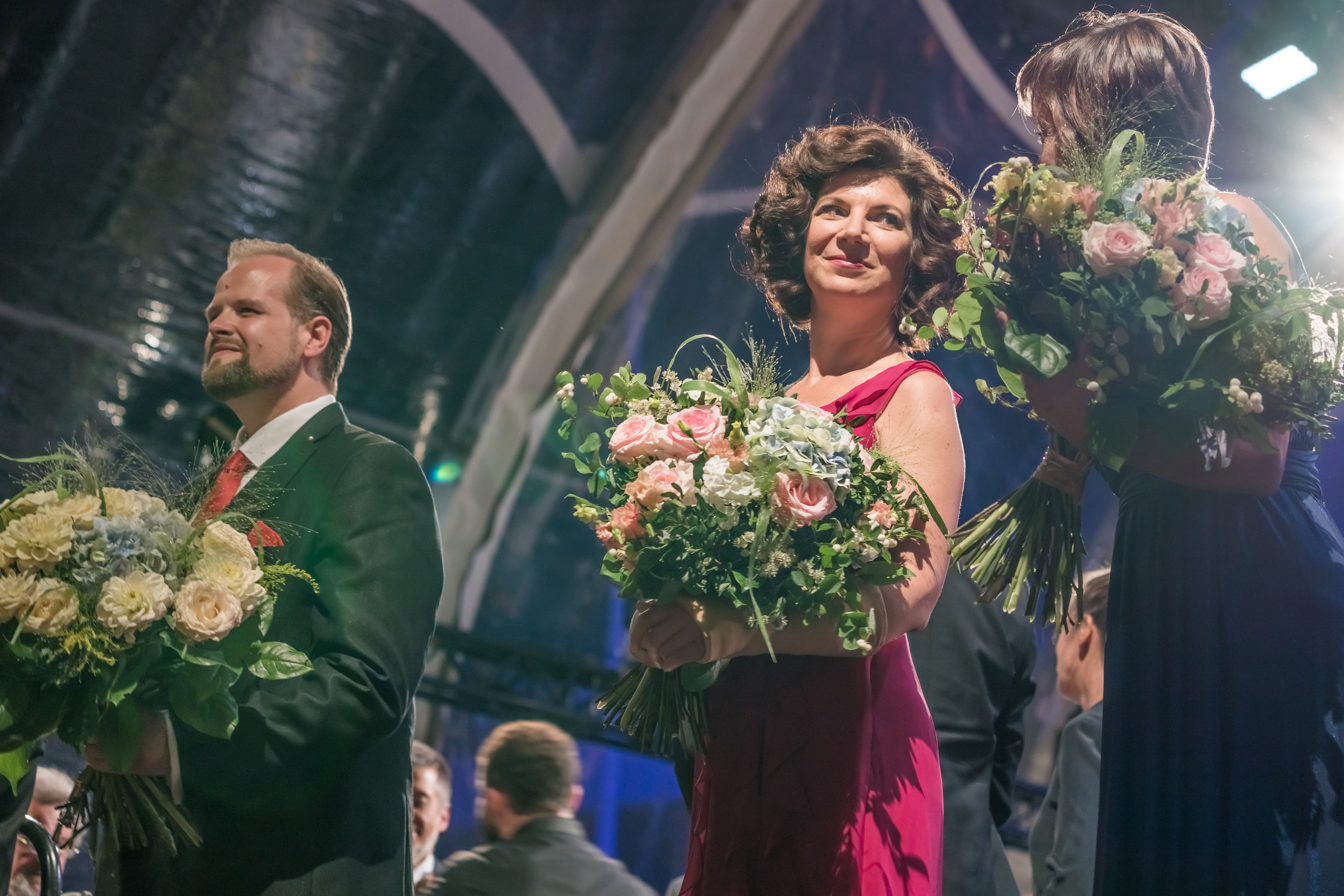
Benjamin Bruns (left with Elisabeth Kulman and Marlis Petersen) 2019 – Beethoven's Ninth under Kiril Petrenko at the Brandenburg Gate with the Berlin Philharmonic.

Benjamin-Helge Bruns (born 1980) is a German operatic tenor.

== Life ==
Born in Hanover, Bruns began his singing career as alto soloist in the boys' choir of his home town of Hanover. After four years of private vocal training with Peter Sefcik, he studied at the Hamburg University of Music and Theatre with Kammersängerin Renate Behle. While still a student, he was offered his first permanent engagement by the Theater Bremen, which enabled him to build up a wide-ranging repertoire at an early stage and was soon followed by an ensemble contract at the Cologne Opera. Via the Sächsische Staatsoper Dresden, his way led him directly to the Wiener Staatsoper, to which he is still bound by a residence contract.

His musical range includes roles like Belmonte (The Abduction from the Seraglio), Tamino (The Magic Flute), Don Ottavio (Don Giovanni), Fenton (Falstaff), Camille de Rosillon (The Merry Widow), Lysander (Britten: A Midsummer Night's Dream), Don Ramiro (La Cenerentola), Boris Grigorievič (Janáček: Káťa Kabanová), Max (Der Freischütz), Erik (The Flying Dutchman), Loge (Das Rheingold), Lohengrin (Lohengrin), Matteo (Arabella), Leukippos (Daphne) and the Italian tenor in Capriccio and Der Rosenkavalier. Guest appearances have taken him, inter alia, to the Staatsoper Unter den Linden, the Bayerische Staatsoper, the Deutsche Oper Berlin, the Staatstheater Nürnberg, the Teatro Real in Madrid, the Opernhaus Zürich, the Teatro Municipal de Santiago in Chile and the Teatro Colón in Buenos Aires. In summer 2010, he made his debut at the Bayreuth Festival as helmsman in The Flying Dutchman.

For Bruns, oratorios and lieder form an important counterpart to his stage work. At the core of his extensive concert repertoire are the great sacred works of Bach, Handel, Haydn, Mozart, Schubert and Mendelssohn. He has performed with renowned ensembles such as the Berliner Philharmoniker, the Sächsische Staatskapelle Dresden, the Bayerisches Staatsorchester, the Symphonieorchester des Bayerischen Rundfunks, the Deutsche Kammerphilharmonie Bremen, the Czech Philharmonic, the MDR Leipzig Radio Symphony Orchestra, the Münchner Philharmoniker, the Bamberger Symphoniker, the WDR Symphony Orchestra Cologne, the Choir and Orchestra of the Netherlands Radio, the Tölzer Knabenchor, the Bremer Philharmoniker, the London Symphony Chorus as well as the Orchestra of the Bachakademie Stuttgart and the Gächinger Kantorei conducted by Helmuth Rilling.

Bruns is a prize winner of the Bundeswettbewerbs Gesang Berlin, the Hamburg Mozart-Wettbewerbs and the international Gesangswettbewerbs der Kammeroper Schloss Rheinsberg. Special awards he received were the Kurt Hübner Prize of the Theater Bremen in 2008 and the Young Talent Award of the Schleswig-Holstein Musik Festival in 2009.

His Lied CD Dichterliebe, with Schumann's Dichterliebe and Der arme Peter, Beethoven's An die ferne Geliebte and Wolf's Liederstrauß with Karola Theill as pianist, was highly praised by the press and nominated for both the International Classical Music Awards and the Deutscher Schallplattenpreis in the category "Vocal Recital".

== Awards ==
- 2002 Bundeswettbewerb Gesang Berlin
- Hamburger Mozart-Wettbewerb
- Internationaler Gesangswettbewerb der Kammeroper Schloss Rheinsberg
- 2008 Kurt-Hübner-Preis
- 2009 Nachwuchsförderpreis des Schleswig-Holstein Musik Festivals
