= Kristian Bezuidenhout =

Australian pianist

- Born: 1979 (age 46–47); South Africa
- Education: Eastman School of Music
- Occupation: Pianist

Kristian Bezuidenhout is an Australian pianist, who specializes in performances on early keyboard instruments.

He was born in South Africa in 1979 and grew up in King William's Town in Eastern South Africa. In 1988 his family decided to leave South Africa and move to Australia. There Bezuidenhout began his studies and completed them later at the Eastman School of Music. He studied fortepiano with Malcolm Bilson and harpsichord with Arthur Haas. At the age of 21 he gained international recognition after winning the first prize in the Bruges Fortepiano Competition.

As a guest pianist Bezuidenhout collaborated with the Freiburg Baroque Orchestra, Concerto Köln, the Collegium Vocale Gent and Les Arts Florissants. He performed with conductors John Eliot Gardiner, Philippe Herreweghe, Trevor Pinnock, Frans Brüggen, and Giovanni Antonini. As a lied pianist, Bezuidenhout recorded songs by Haydn, Mozart, Beethoven and Schumann.

Kristian Bezuidenhout resides in London.

== Recordings ==
- Kristian Bezuidenhout, Freiburger Barockorchester, Pablo Heras-Casado. Felix Mendelssohn. Piano Concerto No.2 & Symphony No.1. Played on Erard 1837 fortepiano. Label: Harmonia Mundi
- Daniel Hope (violin), Kristian Bezuidenhout (harpsichord and organ), Anne Sofie von Otter (mezzo-soprano), Chamber Orchestra of Europe. Vivaldi. Label: Deutsche Grammophon
- Kristian Bezuidenhout with Jan Kobow. Franz Schubert. Die schöne Mullerin. Played on a replica of original Graf piano made by Paul McNulty. Label: Atma
- Kristian Bezuidenhout. Wolfgang Amadeus Mozart. Complete Keyboard Sonatas Played on a replica of the original Walter (Paul McNulty). Label: Harmonia Mundi
- Kristian Bezuidenhout. Ludwig van Beethoven. Piano Concertos Nos. 2&5. Played on a replica of a Graf 1824 made by R.Regier. Label: Harmonia Mundi.
- Kristian Bezuidenhout, Isabelle Faust. Johann Sebastian Bach. Sonatas for Violin & Harpsichord. Label: Harmonia Mundi
