= Astrig Siranossian =

French cellist (born 1988)

- Born: 19 December 1988 (age 37); Lyon, France
- Genres: classical
- Instrument: cello
- Website: www.astrigsiranossian.com

Astrig Siranossian (born 19 December 1988) is a French cellist.

== Biography ==
In 2015, she was invited to spend three years as an artist in residence at the Chapelle Musicale Reine Elisabeth in Waterloo, as well as for the Singer-Polignac Foundation.

She has performed at the Philharmonie de Paris, Musikverein in Vienna, KKL Luzern, Basel Casino, Dijon Opera, Flagey in Brussels, Teatro Colón Buenos Aires, Kennedy Center Washington.

Here recordings have been mentioned in mainstream media. Recordings made in 2018 for the Claves Records label include concertos from A. Khachaturyan and K. Penderecki and received 5 diapasons, 5 Classica stars as well as the Clef du mois ResMusica Award.

In 2016, she released an album dedicated to F. Poulenc, G. Faure and Komitas accompanied by pianist Theo Fouchenneret.

She plays a Ruggieri cello from 1676, loaned by the Boubo Music Foundation from Switzerland.

== Awards ==
- 1998: Royaume de la Musique First Prize
- 2012: Winner of the Antonio Janigros Music Contest
- 2013: Winner of the Banque Populaire Foundation Contest
- 2013: 1st Prize and special prizes at the K. Penderecki Contest
- 2014: Kiefer Hablitzel Prize
- 2016: Musica Prize
- 2017: Coup de cœur by the Belgian Television

== Discography ==
- 2012: Celli Monighetti/ LCMS 1202
- 2016: Poulenc, Fauré, Komitas; Théo Fouchenneret/Claves Records 1604
- 2018: F. Schubert/Evidence
- 2018: Cello Concerto Khachaturyan, Penderecki; Sinfonia Varsovia, Adam Klocek/Claves Records 1802
