= Julian Prégardien =

German tenor (born 1984)

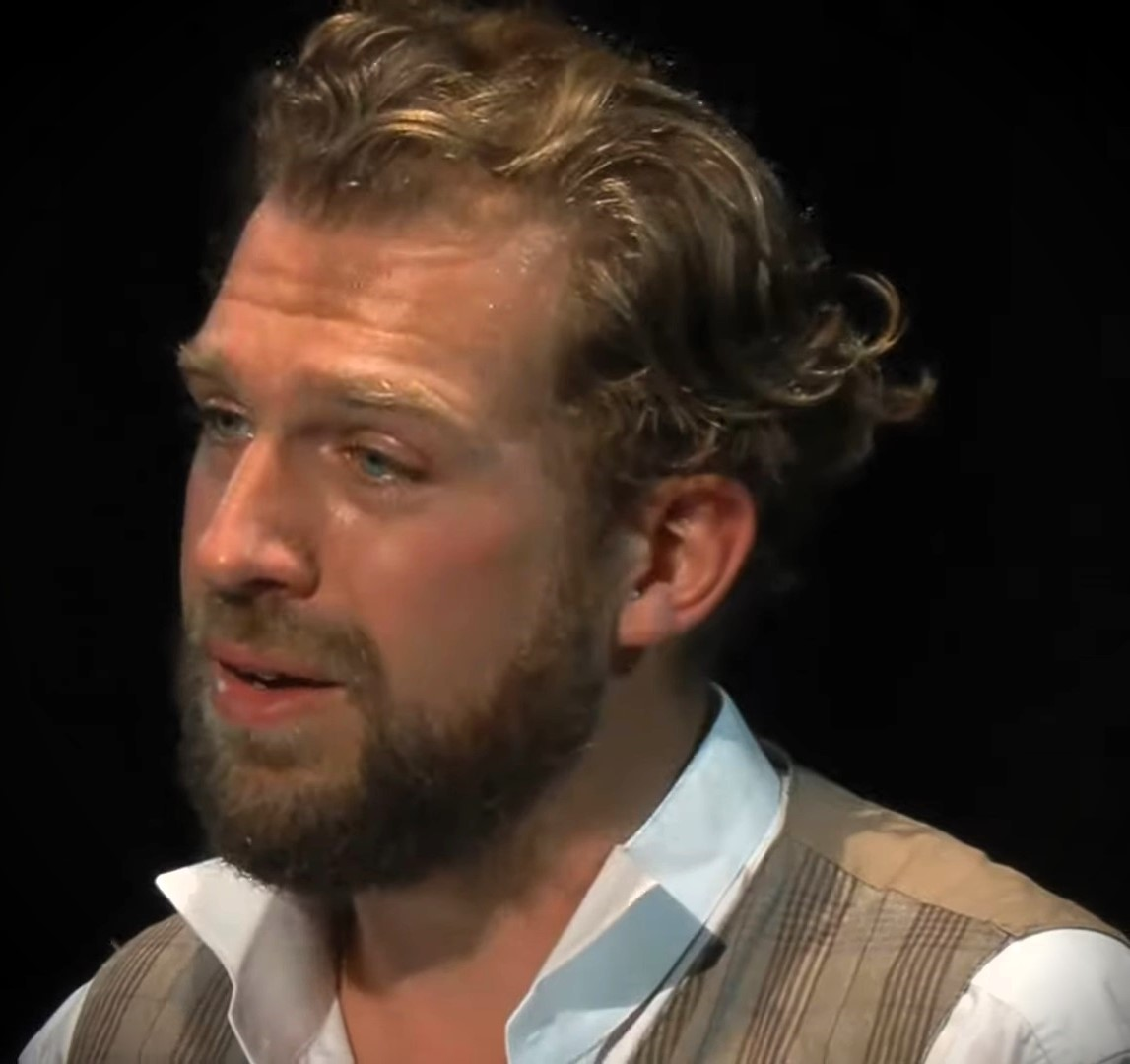
- Prégardien sings in 2021
- Born: 12 July 1984 (age 42); Frankfurt, Hesse, West Germany
- Education: Musikhochschule Freiburg
- Occupation: Operatic tenor
- Website: www.julianpregardien.de

Julian Prégardien (born 12 July 1984) is a German lyric tenor in opera and concert. He is regarded as a leading interpreter of the role of the Evangelist in Bach's Passions.

== Life and career ==
Julian Prégardien was born on 12 July 1984 in Frankfurt into a musical family: his grandfather and his father, tenor Christoph Prégardien, were founding members of the Limburger Domsingknaben, and the soprano Julia Kleiter is his cousin.

=== Education ===
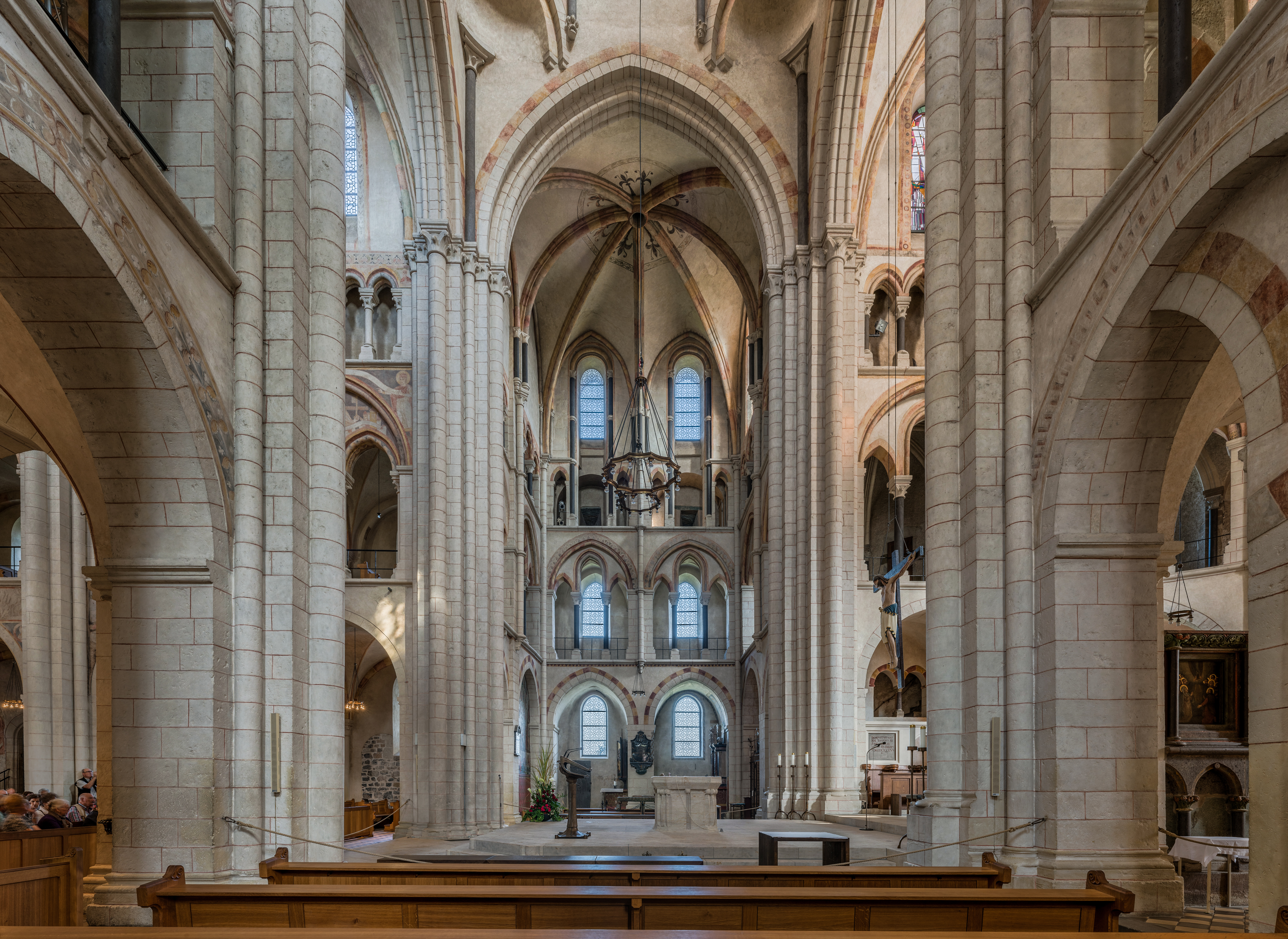
Interior of the Limburg Cathedral

Prégardien grew up in Limburg and began his musical training as a member of the Limburger Domsingknaben, the Limburg Cathedral boys' choir. He sang in several vocal ensembles including the Collegium Vocale Gent and the Kammerchor Stuttgart already before studying at the Musikhochschule Freiburg from 2005 to 2009 with Reginaldo Pinheiro. Prégardien performed the role of Hermenegild in a scenic production of Keiser's opera Fredegund at the Bayerische Theaterakademie August Everding in 2007.

=== Opera ===
In 2008 Prégardien appeared as Nencio in Haydn's L'infedeltà delusa in a touring production of the Aix-en-Provence Festival, travelling to the Opéra de Monte-Carlo, the Teatro Arriaga in Bilbao and to the Musikfest Bremen. He performed the role of Varo in Gluck's Ezio im November 2008 at the Theater an der Wien, with the ensemble Il Complesso Barocco conducted by Alan Curtis in a production that was recorded.

Prégardien was a member of the Oper Frankfurt from the 2009/10 season, where he performed roles such as Tamino in Mozart's Die Zauberflöte, Jason in Charpentier's Médée and Nathanael/Spalanzani/Franz/Pitichinaccio in Offenbach's Hoffmanns Erzählungen. He portrayed the title role of Weber's Oberon at the Bavarian State Opera as part of the Münchner Opernfestspiele in 2017, played at the Prinzregententheater.

=== Concert ===
Prégardien's repertoire in concert is focused on the role of the Evangelist in Bach's Passions. He has worked with leading ensembles and conductors of historically informed performance. In 2023 he was the Evangelist in Bach's St Matthew Passion at the Konzerthaus in Vienna, with the Arnold Schoenberg Chor, the children's choir of the Vienna State Opera and the Vienna Philharmonic conducted by Franz Welser-Möst. A reviewer from Der Standard named him possibly the best Evangelist of his period and wrote specifically:

Not only does the tenor strike the ideal balance between singing and narrating. With his emphatic and penetrating performance, he lends Bach's spiritual drama something profoundly human.

=== Teaching ===
Prégardien lectured at the Hochschule für Musik und Theater München from April 2013 to September 2015. He was appointed professor of voice there in 2017.
