= Wolfgang Koch =

German bass-baritone (born 1966)

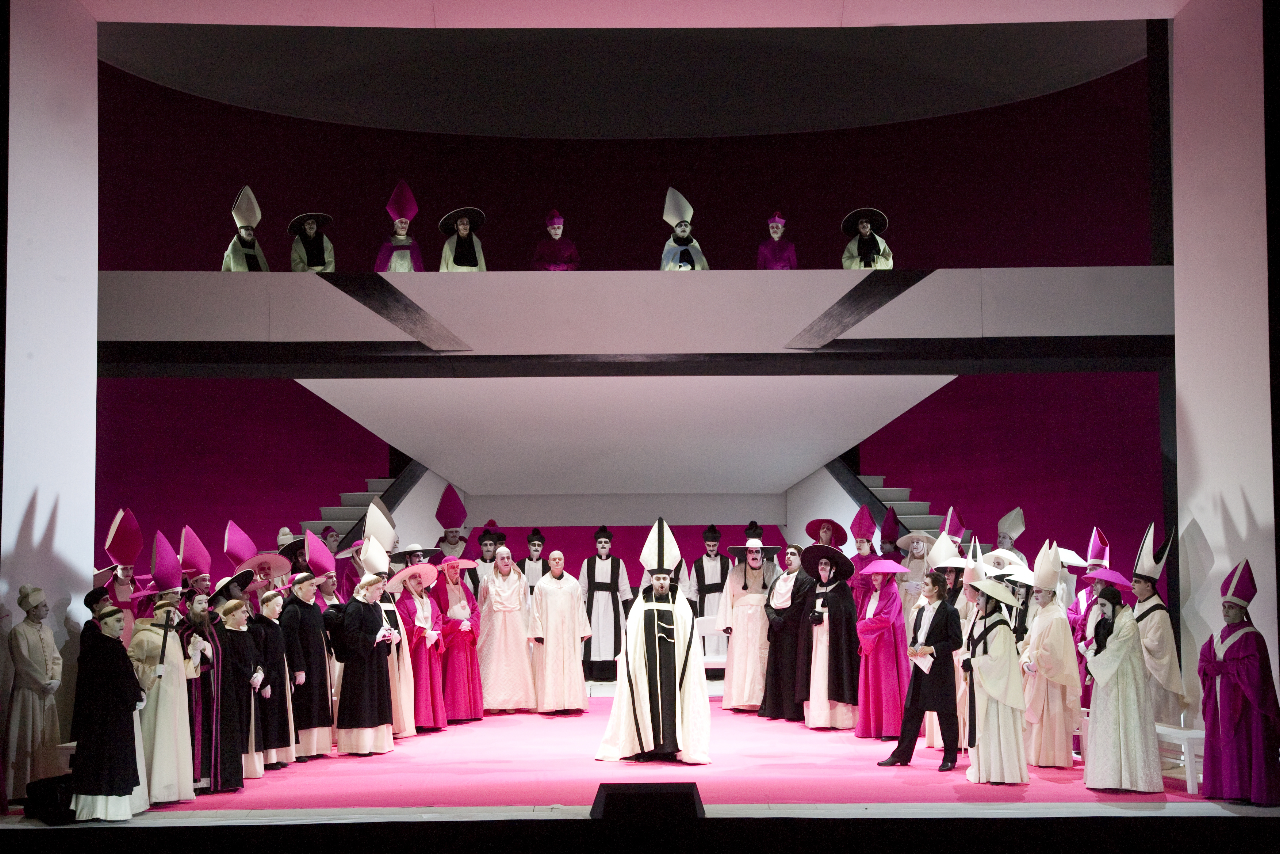
- Koch (centre) as Cardinal Giovanni Morone in Palestrina at the Hamburg State Opera
- Born: 1966 (age 59–60); Burghausen, Bavaria, West Germany

Wolfgang Koch (born 1966) is a German operatic bass-baritone. He is best known for his performances in leading roles in the operas of Richard Wagner.

== Early life ==
Koch studied at University of Music and Performing Arts Munich and went on to study under Josef Metternich in Feldafing and then Gianni Raimondi in Milan.

He was first engaged in a permanent role at the Stadttheater Bern in 1991. In 1993 he moved to the Stuttgart State Opera, where he stayed until 1996. He then pursued a freelance career and is now based in Vienna.

== Career ==
=== Wagnerian roles ===
Koch has frequently appeared as Hans Sachs in Wagner's Die Meistersinger von Nürnberg. He made his debut in this role in 2004 in Bielefeld, and has since appeared in the role in Frankfurt, at the Vienna State Opera, and at the Royal Opera House. In Tristan und Isolde he has taken the role of Kurwenal at the Hamburg State Opera and the Salzburg Festival. In Wagner's cycle Der Ring des Nibelungen, Koch notably appeared as Wotan at the Bayreuth Festival in 2013. He appeared in the same cycle as Alberich at Hamburg in 2008. At the Vienna State Opera, Koch sang in addition to Hans Sachs also Kothner in Die Meistersinger von Nürnberg and Telramund in Lohengrin.

=== Other repertoire ===
Wolfgang Koch has also found success with leading roles from other composers, such as the title role in Busoni's Doctor Faust (Munich 2008) and the cardinal legate Morone and the cardinal Borromeo in Pfitzner's Palestrina (Munich 2009 / Hamburg 2011 / Frankfurt 2010 under Kirill Petrenko). At the Theater an der Wien he appeared as Jochanaan in Salome and in the title role in Hindemith's Mathis der Maler in 2012. Furthermore, he has appeared as Georg Danton in Dantons Tod and as Barak in Die Frau ohne Schatten at the Vienna State Opera in 2018 and 2019 respectively.

== Reception ==
In 2014 he was awarded the prestigious title of Kammersänger by the Bavarian Ministry of Culture. Following this award, the Bavarian State Opera commissioned artist Christoph Brech to create a video in which Koch appears in seven operatic roles: Wotan, Don Pizarro, Sir John Falstaff, Alberich, Jochanaan, Carlo Borromeo and finally Don Giovanni. He has performed all of these roles, except Falstaff. In a review of this art exhibition for Main Post, Katharina Winterhalter described Koch as appearing vulnerable under masks of drama and masculinity.
