= Thomas Dunford =

French lutenist

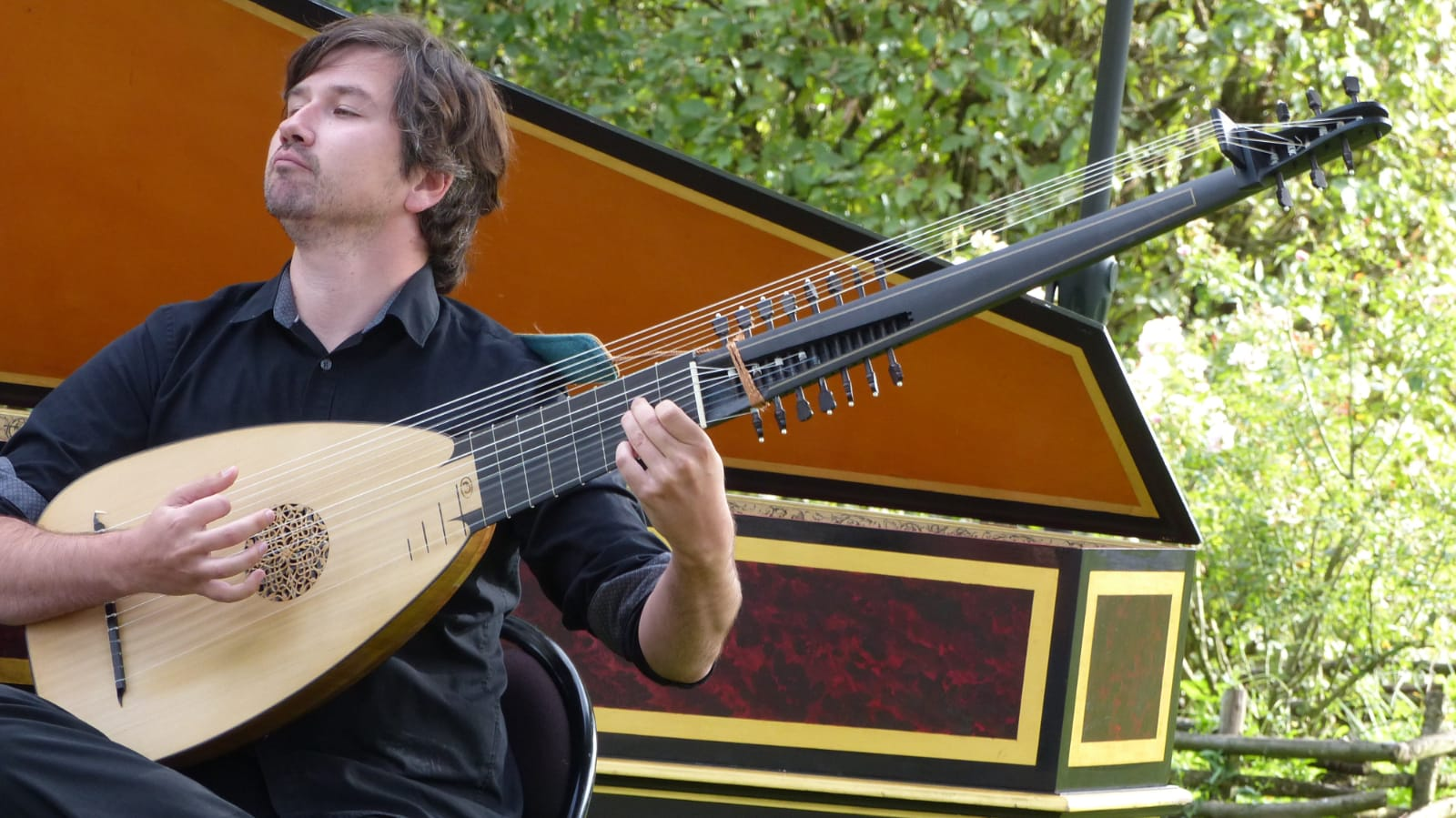
- Dunford playing the theorbo
- Born: 6 March 1988 (age 38); France
- Occupation: Lutenist
- Family: Jonathan Dunford (father); Sylvia Abramowicz (mother)
- Awards: Caecilia prize Classica magazine's "Choc de l'année"

Thomas Dunford (born 1988) is a French lutenist.

== Life and career ==
Dunford is the son of American viola da gambist Jonathan Dunford and viola da gambist Sylvia Abramowicz.

Dunford completed his musical studies in 2006 at the Conservatoire de Paris, and earned his bachelor's degree in 2009. He began his performing career as the lutenist in Shakespeare's Twelfth Night on stage at the Comédie Française in 2005>

Dunford's first solo CD Lachrimae, recorded for the Alpha label in 2012, was awarded the Caecilia prize in 2013. BBC Music Magazine called him the “Eric Clapton of the lute”. Dunford's second CD Labirinto d’Amore was awarded the «Choc» by Classica magazine. Dunford plays with a number of ensembles including Les Arts Florissants, the Centre de Musique Baroque de Versailles, Le Concert Spirituel, and Le Concert d'Astrée as well as performing solo and with other leading artists.

Thomas Dunford is the artistic director of the Jupiter Ensemble.
