= John Daszak =

British operatic tenor

John Daszak is a British operatic tenor, who made his debut with The Royal Opera in 1996 and performed across Europe. His father was Ukrainian and his mother British. He trained at the Guildhall School of Music and Drama, the Royal Northern College of Music and the Accademia d'Arte Lirica in Osimo, Italy.
