= Anna Maria Chiuri =

Italian mezzo-soprano (born 1968)

Anna Maria Chiuri (born October 3, 1968) is an Italian mezzo-soprano. She has performed at leading opera houses and collaborated with many conductors and directors.

== Early life and education ==
Chiuri was born in San Candido, Bolzano, on October 3, 1968. She studied at the Conservatorio Arrigo Boito in Parma under soprano Jenny Anvelt and refined her technique with tenor Franco Corelli.

== Operatic career ==
Chiuri has appeared in major opera productions. At the Teatro alla Scala (Milan), she performed in Don Carlos and Il Trittico under Riccardo Chailly. Performing at the Arena di Verona, she appeared as Amneris in Aida. At the Salzburger Festspiele, she performed the role of Herodias in Salome under Franz Welser-Möst. At the Teatro Regio di Torino, she performed the role of Eboli in Don Carlos under Gianandrea Noseda.

Her repertoire also includes roles as Fricka in Wagner's Das Rheingold and Die Walküre at Teatro Massimo in Palermo, Azucena in Il Trovatore at Teatro La Fenice in Venice, Klytemnestra in Elektra by Strauss, and Ulrica in Un Ballo in Maschera at Opéra Royal de Wallonie and NCPA in Beijing.

Chiuri has also performed in contemporary works, such as Luigi Nono's Intolleranza 1960 at the Salzburger Festspiele and Il Prigioniero by Luigi Dallapiccola.

== The Verdi Sessions Vol.1 ==
In 2024, Chiuri contributed to The Verdi Sessions Vol.1, a project reinterpreting Giuseppe Verdi's works by blending classical music with jazz influences. She performed "Oh, dischiuso è il firmamento" from Nabucco, collaborating with Alessandro Bertozzi (alto saxophone), Francesco Chebat (piano), Riccardo Fioravanti (double bass), and Ettore Fioravanti (drums).

== Concert performances ==
Chiuri has participated in numerous concert performances and oratorios, including Beethoven's Ninth Symphony at Lincoln Center, New York. Verdi's Messa da Requiem in Prague and Washington, and Mozart's Requiem in Florence.

== Discography ==
Chiuri's recordings include Pasqua Fiorentina by I. Capitanio (Bongiovanni label), Bellini's Messa in Sol, and Puccini's Il Trittico (DVD), live from La Scala.

== Awards and recognition ==
Chiuri received the Premio Abbiati in 2012 for her portrayal of Herodias in Strauss's Salome.
