= Jurowski =

Jurowski is a Polish-language surname which appears in various forms among the neighboring peoples.

Language	Masculine	Feminine
Polish	Jurowski	Jurowska
Belarusian (Romanization)	Юроўскі (Juroŭski, Yurouski, Iurouski)	Юроўская (Juroŭskaja, Yurouskaya, Iurouskaia) It may refer to
Czech, Slovak	Jurovský	Jurovská
Lithuanian	Jurauskas	Jurauskienė (married); Jurauskaitė (unmarried)
Russian (Romanization)	Юровский (Yurovsky, Yurovskiy, Iurovskii, Jurovskij)	Юровская (Yurovskaya, Yurovskaia, Iurovskaia, Jurovskaja)
Ukrainian (Romanization)	Юровський (Yurovskyi, Yurovskyy, Iurovskyi, Jurovskyj)	Юровська (Yurovska, Iurovska, Jurovska)

Notable people with the surnames include:

- Dmitri Jurowski (born 1979), German conductor, son of Michail and grandson of Vladimir Michailovich
- Michail Jurowski (1945–2022), Russian conductor, son of Vladimir Michailovich
- Vladimir Jurowski (born 1972), Russian conductor, son of Michail and grandson of Vladimir Michailovich; brother of Dmitri

== See also ==
- Jurkowski
