= Hermine Bland =

Austrian stage actor (1850-1919)

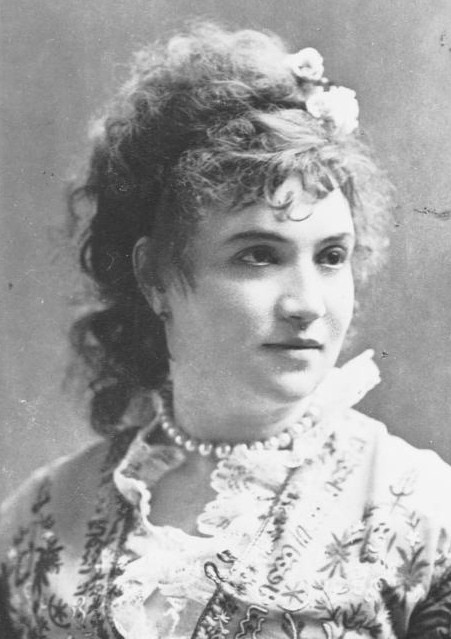
- Born: 24 December 1850; Vienna, Austrian Empire
- Died: 19 November 1919 (aged 68); Munich
- Occupation: stage actor

Hermine Bland, born Hermine Steiner (24 December 1850 in Vienna, Austrian Empire – died 19 November 1919, in Munich), was an Austrian actress who specialized in the roles of heroines and lovers in tragedies.

== Life ==
Hermine Bland initially trained as an actress with Julius Conradi in Vienna, then in Schwerin with Baron Alfred von Wolzogen, the director of the court theater there, and later with Bernays in England. Bland performed at theaters in Cologne, Schwerin (1868–1871), at the Altes Theater (1871–1873), in Lübeck, Stuttgart, and Breslau, as well as at the Ronacher. She also performed at the Konzerthaus Berlin and, from 1875 until her retirement from the stage in 1898, at the Munich Court Theater.

She played the female lead in all private performances for the Ludwig II of Bavaria, as she conformed to the king's ideal image of femininity. The king also corresponded with her and gave her valuable gifts such as jewelry and valuables.

== Roles (selection) ==
- Portia – The Merchant of Venice (William Shakespeare)
- Gittah – Nathan the Wise (Gotthold Ephraim Lessing)
- Adelheid – Götz von Berlichingen (Johann Wolfgang von Goethe)
- Kunigunde – Hans Sachs (Albert Lortzing)
- Urvasi – Urvasi (Wilhelm Kienzl)
- Antigone – Antigone (Sophocles)
- Hermione – Andromaque (Jean Racine)
- Emilia – Emilia Galotti (Gotthold Ephraim Lessing)
- Esther – Esther (Karl von Perfall)
- Anna – Der Sonnwendhof (Salomon Hermann Mosenthal)
