= Bavarian State Opera =

Opera company in Munich, Bavaria, Germany

Bayerische Staatsoper Bavarian State Opera
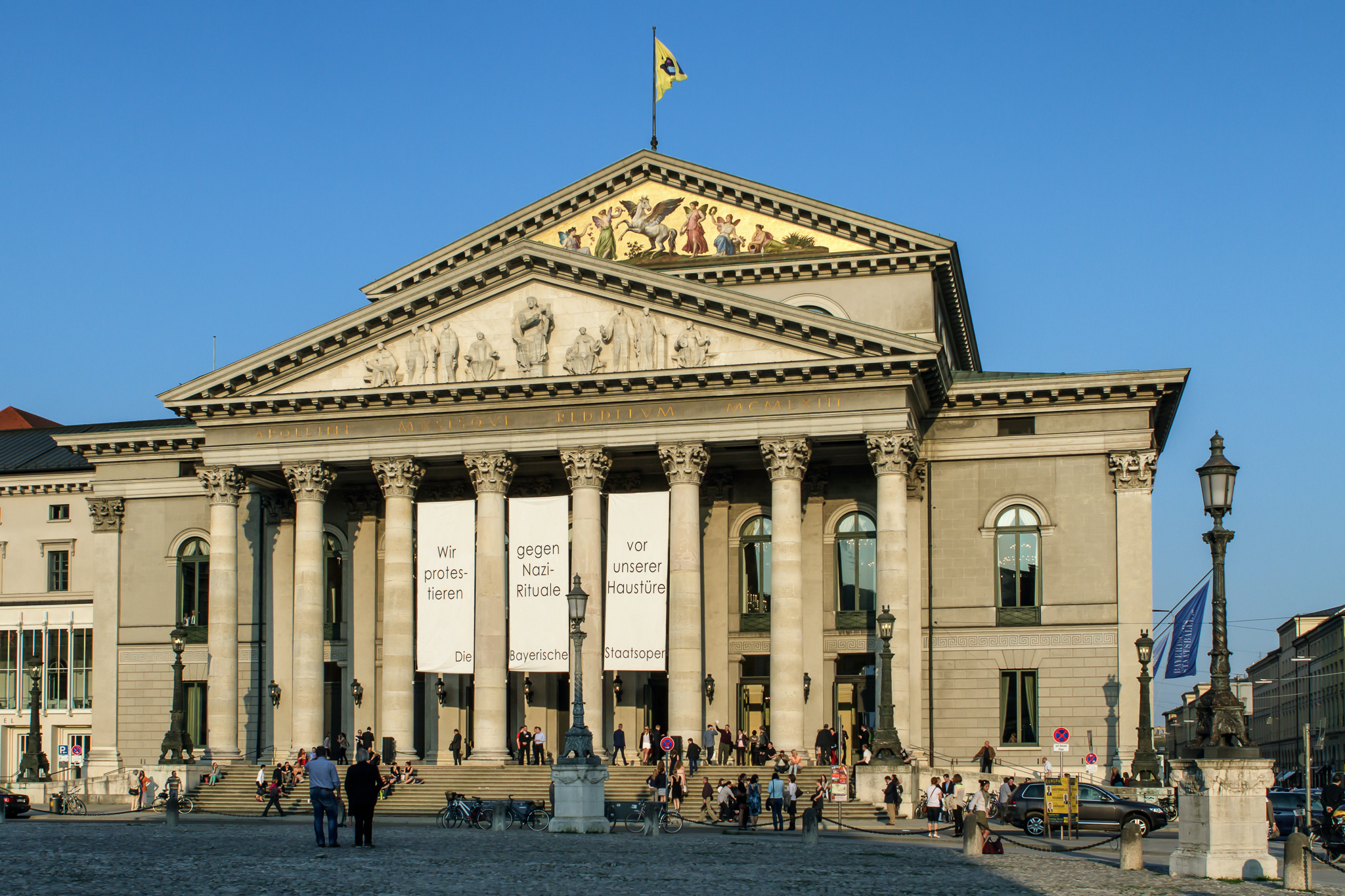
- Nationaltheater München
- Formation: 1653
- Location: Munich, Bavaria, Germany
- Intendant: Serge Dorny
- Music director: Vladimir Jurowski
- Website: www.staatsoper.de

The Bavarian State Opera (German: Bayerische Staatsoper) is a German opera company based in Munich. Its main venue is the Nationaltheater München, and its orchestra the Bavarian State Orchestra.

== History ==
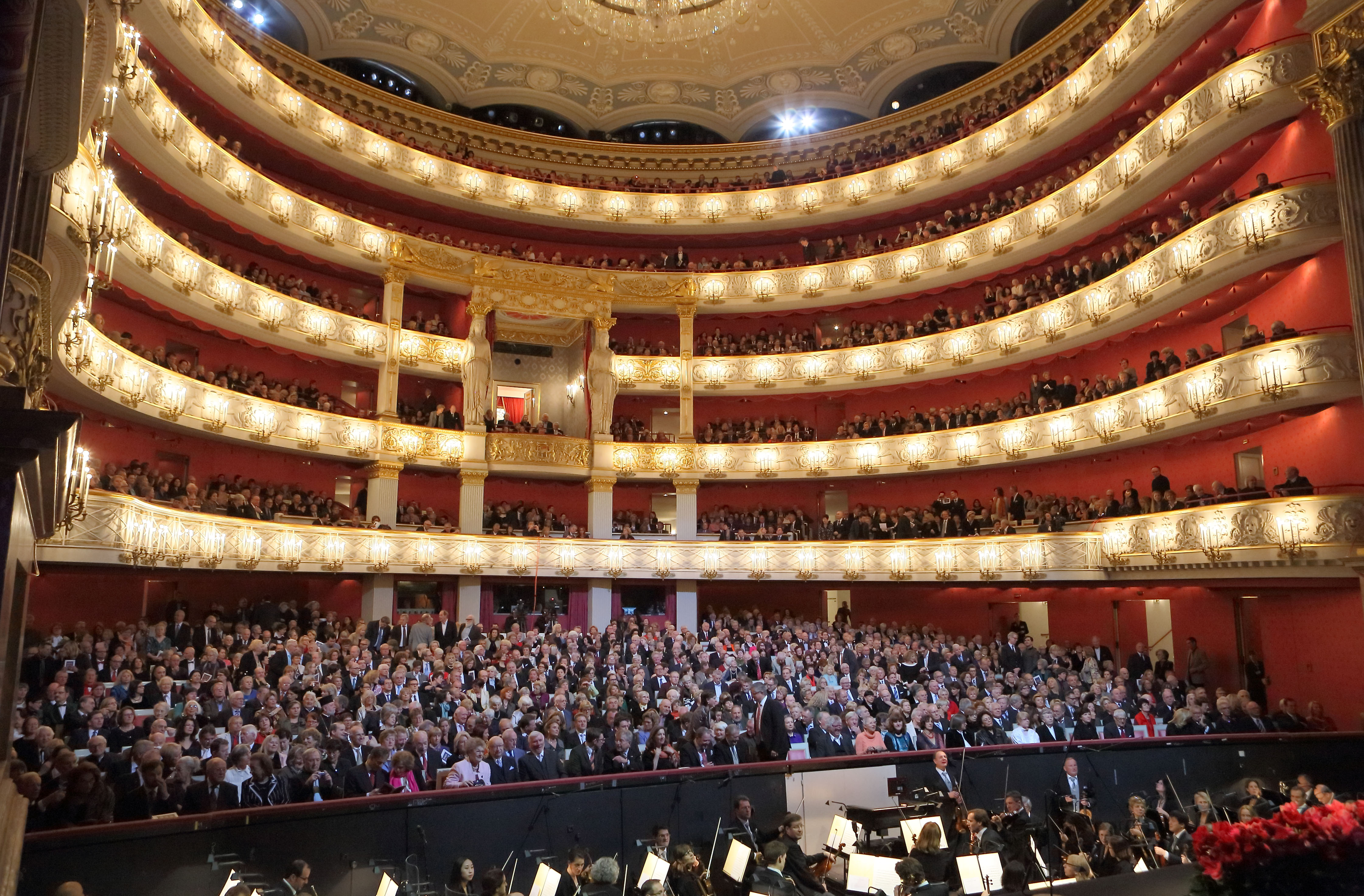
Nationaltheater München, interior

=== Court opera under the Wittelsbach electors ===
The parent ensemble of the company was founded in 1653, under Electress consort Princess Henriette Adelaide of Savoy, when Giovanni Battista Maccioni's L'arpa festante was performed in the court theatre. The performance is regarded as the beginning of opera in Munich and presumably of the genre in the German-speaking lands altogether. In 1657 the court inaugurated a purpose-built opera house on the Salvatorplatz, described as the first free-standing theatre building north of the Alps, with an opera by the Hofkapellmeister Johann Caspar Kerll. The company's orchestra is older still: the Bavarian State Orchestra traces its origins to 1523, when the composer Ludwig Senfl became head of the Munich court choir, and its public concert series, the Musikalische Akademie, has existed since 1811.

In 1753, the Residence Theatre (Cuvillies Theatre) was opened as a major stage. Wolfgang Amadeus Mozart sought a permanent position at the Munich court in 1777 and was turned away for want of a vacancy, but the Cuvillies Theatre nevertheless enjoyed perhaps its greatest moment in music history when his Idomeneo received its world premiere there during the Carnival season of 1781. Munich's operatic taste later shifted from the Italian repertoire favoured under King Max I Joseph towards the cultivation of a German art form under Ludwig I, and the court opera moved from the by then cramped Cuvillies Theatre into the far more spacious Nationaltheater.

=== The Nationaltheater and the Wagner premieres ===
The foundation stone of the Nationaltheater on Max-Joseph-Platz was laid in October 1811 to a design by Karl von Fischer inspired by the Paris Odéon; delayed by financing difficulties, the house opened on 12 October 1818. On 14 January 1823 the theatre burned to its foundation walls after the stage decoration caught fire during a performance of a comic opera by Étienne Méhul; the blaze could not be fought because the extinguishing water had frozen in one of the coldest winters of the century. Rebuilt to Fischer's plans under Leo von Klenze, who added the pillared portico, and financed in part by a special levy on beer known as the Bierpfennig, the Nationaltheater reopened on 2 January 1825. Franz Lachner, who led the house from 1836 to 1867, was the first of its musical directors to bear the title Generalmusikdirektor.

The accession of the eighteen-year-old king Ludwig II in 1864 made Munich the centre of activity of his favourite composer, Richard Wagner, and brought the Hof- und Nationaltheater four world premieres of the permanent international repertoire. On 10 June 1865 Hans von Bülow conducted the first performance of Tristan und Isolde, previously considered unperformable after abandoned attempts in Vienna, Karlsruhe and elsewhere, and Die Meistersinger von Nürnberg followed under Bülow on 21 June 1868. Das Rheingold (22 September 1869) and Die Walküre (26 June 1870) were then premiered on the king's explicit orders and against the composer's wishes, conducted by Franz Wüllner, as Wagner wished to withhold the works until the complete Ring could be staged. Wagner's early opera Die Feen also received its posthumous world premiere in Munich, in 1888. Hermann Levi, the conductor of the Bayreuth premiere of Parsifal, served as Generalmusikdirektor from 1872 to 1896.

In 1875, the Munich Opera Festival took place for the first time. Richard Strauss, born in Munich as the son of the court orchestra's principal horn player Franz Strauss, joined the company as third conductor in 1886 and returned as Hofkapellmeister from 1894 to 1896; his exclusion from conducting the Feen premiere had prompted his earlier departure for Weimar. Alongside Mozart and Wagner, Strauss became the third pillar of the Munich repertoire, and the first festival days devoted to his music were celebrated in the city in 1910.

=== Prinzregententheater and the early twentieth century ===
While opera performances were also held in the Prinzregententheater (completed in 1901), the company's home base is the Nationaltheater München on Max-Joseph-Platz. Conceived as a festival theatre on the model of Wagner's Bayreuth Festspielhaus, the Prinzregententheater opened, fittingly, with Die Meistersinger von Nürnberg. Felix Mottl, Hofkapellmeister from 1904 and director of the court opera from 1907, suffered a heart attack while conducting his hundredth performance of Tristan und Isolde on 21 June 1911 and died shortly afterwards; the passage in the second act at which he collapsed is marked to this day in the orchestra's performance material.

With the end of the First World War the court opera became the Bavarian State Opera. Bruno Walter, a celebrated champion of Mozart and Mahler, led the company until 1923; his tenure included the world premiere of Hans Pfitzner's Palestrina at the Prinzregententheater on 12 June 1917, one of the outstanding events of his Munich years, and he also brought operas by Franz Schreker, Walter Braunfels and the young Erich Wolfgang Korngold to the house. His successor Hans Knappertsbusch was driven from office in 1935 by the National Socialist authorities, whom he had dared to criticise publicly; Knappertsbusch had himself been the prominent initiator of the 1933 "Protest of the Richard Wagner City of Munich" against Thomas Mann's Munich lecture on his essay Leiden und Größe Richard Wagners, a journalistic attack that contributed to Mann's decision to go into exile.

=== National Socialism, destruction and reconstruction ===
Clemens Krauss subsequently led the house as conducting general manager, dealing adroitly with the authorities of the Hitler regime while cementing the Mozart–Wagner–Strauss tradition and opening the house to ambitious stage direction. Under Krauss, Strauss's Friedenstag (1938) and Capriccio (1942) received their world premieres, the latter the last major premiere in the old Nationaltheater. In the night of 3 October 1943 the building on Max-Joseph-Platz was struck by incendiary bombs and largely destroyed.

Performances resumed immediately after the war in the Prinzregententheater. The general managers Georg Hartmann and, subsequently, Rudolf Hartmann guided the ensemble through the postwar years, the latter organising the second reconstruction of the Nationaltheater, a project driven substantially by the civic engagement of the Friends of the Nationaltheater society (founded in 1951) and supported by a succession of important conductors: the young Georg Solti, Rudolf Kempe, Ferenc Fricsay and Joseph Keilberth, who died in the Munich orchestra pit in 1968 during a festival performance of Tristan und Isolde. Reconstruction, carried out largely to Fischer's original design, began in 1958, the ensemble having remained at the Prinzregententheater in the interim. On 21 November 1963, almost twenty years after the end of the war, the Nationaltheater was ceremonially reopened with a new production of Strauss's Die Frau ohne Schatten staged by Rudolf Hartmann and conducted by Keilberth, with a cast including Ingrid Bjoner, Inge Borkh, Jess Thomas, Dietrich Fischer-Dieskau and Martha Mödl; a new production of Die Meistersinger von Nürnberg, premiered in the house in 1868, formed part of the opening festivities.

=== Late twentieth century ===
The director Günther Rennert became general manager in 1967, opening the house to stage directors such as Jean-Pierre Ponnelle, August Everding and Otto Schenk, while Wolfgang Sawallisch began a two-decade tenure as Generalmusikdirektor in 1971 that consolidated the orchestra's international reputation in Wagner and Strauss; Everding (1977–1982) and then Sawallisch himself (1982–1993) subsequently served as general managers. From the 1970s the house also maintained a close association with Carlos Kleiber, reflected in opera performances, concerts, tours and celebrated recordings. On 9 July 1978 the company gave the world premiere of Aribert Reimann's Lear, commissioned by the Bavarian State Opera, in a production by Ponnelle conducted by Gerd Albrecht; Dietrich Fischer-Dieskau, at whose suggestion the opera had been composed, sang the title role.

Sir Peter Jonas became the general manager in 1993, the first British general manager of any major German-speaking opera house. Jonas introduced a sustained cultivation of the Baroque repertoire and of distinctive directorial signatures; the giant dinosaur that fell in his second new production, Handel's Giulio Cesare, booed and cheered in equal measure, became an icon of a new operatic era, and his "Opera for All" open-air format was continued by his successors. After Sawallisch's departure in 1992, Peter Schneider stood at the head of the orchestra as chief conductor until Jonas engaged Zubin Mehta as Generalmusikdirektor from the 1998–99 season; Mehta held the post until 2006.

=== Twenty-first century ===
Following Jonas's departure in 2006, the house was led for two years by a directorate consisting of the new Generalmusikdirektor Kent Nagano, Ulrike Heßler and Roland Schwab. In 2008, Nikolaus Bachler, previously director of the Vienna Burgtheater, became Intendant (general manager) of the opera company, and Kirill Petrenko became Generalmusikdirektor (GMD) in 2013. In 2014, the Bavarian State Opera received the Opernhaus des Jahres (opera house of the year) award from Opernwelt magazine. In October 2015, the company announced the extensions of the contracts of Bachler and of Petrenko through August 2021. The Bachler years combined splendour and innovation, marked by Petrenko's musical excellence and the star power of singers such as Anja Harteros and Jonas Kaufmann; the company also continued to commission new works, among them two operas by the Munich-born Jörg Widmann, Das Gesicht im Spiegel (2003) and Babylon (2012), and several world premieres by Miroslav Srnka. Both Bachler and Petrenko stood down from their respective posts at the close of the 2020–2021 season.

In March 2018, the company announced the appointments of Serge Dorny as its next general manager, and of Vladimir Jurowski as its next GMD, both effective with the 2021–2022 season. Dorny's first seasons brought new festival formats, including the contemporary festival Ja, Mai and the deliberately accessible September Festival. In the 2022–23 season the Bavarian State Orchestra celebrated the 500th anniversary of its founding; the orchestra has repeatedly been named Orchester des Jahres (orchestra of the year) by Opernwelt, in the anniversary season for the eighth consecutive time. In October 2024 the company began its first new production of Der Ring des Nibelungen since 2012, staged by Tobias Kratzer and conducted by Jurowski; the cycle opened with Das Rheingold on 27 October 2024 and is planned for completion in 2027.

In June 2024, the company announced the extension of Dorny's contract as Intendant through 2031, and of Jurowski's contract as GMD through the close of the 2027–2028 season. At the time of this announcement, Jurowski had been expected to stand down as GMD at the close of the 2027–2028 season. In July 2025, the Bavarian Ministry of Science, Research and Art announced a one-year extension of Jurowski's contract as GMD, through the 2028–2029 season, with Jurowski expected to close his tenure as GMD at the end of the 2028–2029 season.

In 2025, Petr Popelka first guest-conducted with the company in a production of Kata Kabanova. In June 2026, the Bavarian Ministry of Science, Research and Art announced the appointment of Popelka as its next GMD, effective with the 2029–2030 season, with an initial contract of five years.

The company received the "Opera Company of the Year" award at the 2018 and 2023 International Opera Awards.

== Intendanten (General Managers) ==
- Johann Nepomuk von Poißl (1824–1848)
- Karl Theodor von Küstner (1848–1851)
- Franz von Dingelstedt (1851–1858)
- Karl von Perfall (1868–1893)
- Ernst von Possart (1895–1906)
- Albert von Speidel (1907–1912)
- Clemens von Franckenstein (1912–1918)
- Karl Zeiss (1918–1924)
- Clemens von Franckenstein (1924–1934)
- Hans Knappertsbusch (1934–1935)
- Oskar Walleck (1935–1937)
- Clemens Krauss (1937–1940)
- Georg Hartmann (1945–1952)
- Rudolf Hartmann (1952–1967)
- Günther Rennert (1967–1976)
- August Everding (1977–1982)
- Wolfgang Sawallisch (1982–1993)
- Peter Jonas (1993–2006)
- Kent Nagano (2006–2008)
- Nikolaus Bachler (2008–2021)
- Serge Dorny (2021–present)

== Generalmusikdirektoren (General Music Directors) ==
- Franz Lachner (1836–1867)
- Hans von Bülow (1864–1869)
- Franz Wüllner (1870–1877)
- Hermann Levi (1872–1896)
- Richard Strauss (1894–1896)
- Max Erdmannsdörfer (1896–1898)
- Bernhard Stavenhagen (1898–1902)
- Hermann Zumpe (1901–1903)
- Felix Mottl (1904–1911)
- Bruno Walter (1913–1922)
- Hans Knappertsbusch (1922–1935)
- Clemens Krauss (1937–1944)
- Hans Knappertsbusch (1945)
- Georg Solti (1946–1952)
- Rudolf Kempe (1952–1954)
- Ferenc Fricsay (1956–1958)
- Joseph Keilberth (1959–1968)
- Wolfgang Sawallisch (1971–1992)
- Peter Schneider (interim, 1992–1998)
- Zubin Mehta (1998–2006)
- Kent Nagano (2006–2013)
- Kirill Petrenko (2013–2021)
- Vladimir Jurowski (2021–present)
- Petr Popelka (designate, effective 2029)

== World premieres ==
Date	Opera	Composer	Libretto	Location
2 October 1753	Catone in Utica	Ferrandini	Metastasio	Residence Theatre
13 January 1775	La finta giardiniera	Mozart	Giuseppe Petrosellini(?)	Salvator Theatre
29 January 1781	Idomeneo	Mozart	Giambattista Varesco	Residence Theatre
1 February 1782	Semiramide	Salieri	Metastasio	Residence Theatre
27 January 1807	Iphigenie in Aulis	Franz Danzi	Karl Reger	Residence Theatre
4 June 1811	Abu Hassan	Weber	Franz Carl Hiemer	Residence Theatre
23 December 1812	Jephtas Gelübde	Meyerbeer	Aloys Schreiber	Residence Theatre
10 June 1865	Tristan und Isolde	Wagner	Wagner	National Theatre
21 June 1868	Die Meistersinger von Nürnberg	Wagner	Wagner	National Theatre
22 September 1869	Das Rheingold	Wagner	Wagner	National Theatre
26 June 1870	Die Walküre	Wagner	Wagner	National Theatre
29 June 1888	Die Feen	Wagner	Wagner	National Theatre
23 January 1897	Königskinder (Melodrama)	Humperdinck	Elsa Bernstein	National Theatre
10 October 1897	Sarema	Alexander von Zemlinsky	Alexander and Adolf von Zemlinsky, Arnold Schoenberg	National Theatre
22 January 1899	Der Bärenhäuter	Siegfried Wagner	Siegfried Wagner	National Theatre
27 November 1903	Le donne curiose	Wolf-Ferrari	Luigi Sugana (German by Hermann Teibler)	Residence Theatre
19 March 1906	I quatro rusteghi	Wolf-Ferrari	Giuseppe Pizzolato (German by Hermann Teibler)	National Theatre
11 December 1906	Das Christ-Elflein	Hans Pfitzner	Pfitzner and Ilse von Stach	National Theatre
4 December 1909	Il segreto di Susanna	Wolf-Ferrari	Enrico Golisciani (German by Max Kalbeck)	National Theatre
28 March 1916	Der Ring des Polykrates / Violanta	Korngold	Leo Feld and Julius Korngold / Hans Müller-Einigen	National Theatre
12 June 1917	Palestrina	Hans Pfitzner	Pfitzner	Prinzregententheater
30 November 1920	Die Vögel	Walter Braunfels	Braunfels (play by Aristophanes)	National Theatre
24 July 1938	Friedenstag	Richard Strauss	Joseph Gregor and Stefan Zweig	National Theatre
5 February 1939	Der Mond	Carl Orff	Orff	National Theatre
28 October 1942	Capriccio	Richard Strauss	Strauss and Clemens Krauss	National Theatre
11 August 1957	Die Harmonie der Welt	Paul Hindemith	Hindemith	Prinzregententheater
9 July 1978	Lear	Aribert Reimann	Claus H. Henneberg	National Theatre
6 July 1991	Ubu Rex	Penderecki	Penderecki and Jerzy Jarocki (play by Alfred Jarry)	National Theatre
17 July 2003	Das Gesicht im Spiegel	Jörg Widmann	Roland Schimmelpfennig	Cuvilliés Theatre
30 June 2007	Alice in Wonderland	Unsuk Chin	David Henry Hwang	National Theatre
22 February 2010	Die Tragödie des Teufels	Peter Eötvös	Albert Ostermaier	National Theatre
27 October 2012	Babylon	Jörg Widmann	Peter Sloterdijk	National Theatre

== Recordings ==
Bavarian State Opera has issued numerous recordings under record labels such as Deutsche Grammophon. In May 2021, it launched its own recording label, Bayerische Staatsoper Recordings (BSOrec).

Among the company's noted recordings are the 1989 video recording of Wagners' Der Ring des Nibelungen conducted by Wolfgang Sawallisch, which won Best Video in the 1993 Gramophone Classical Music Awards. The 1973 recording of Richard Strauss's Der Rosenkavalier, conducted by Carlos Kleiber and released in 2008, was highly acclaimed and selected as Editor's Choice in the April 2009 issue of Gramophone Magazine.

At the International Opera Awards, the Bayerische Staatsoper won the 2018 the Opera Company Award. Their recording of Handel's Agrippina, directed by Barrie Kosky from the Royal Opera House, has been shortlisted for the 2018 Opera Awards.

In 1977, a recording by the Bavarian State Opera was selected by NASA to be included on the Voyager Golden Record, a gold-plated copper record that was sent into space on the Voyager space craft. The record contained sounds and images which had been selected as examples of the diversity of life and culture on Earth. In the recording, soprano Edda Moser sings "Der Hölle Rache kocht in meinem Herzen" from Mozart's opera, The Magic Flute, conducted by Sawallisch.
