= Tatiana Andrianova (organist) =

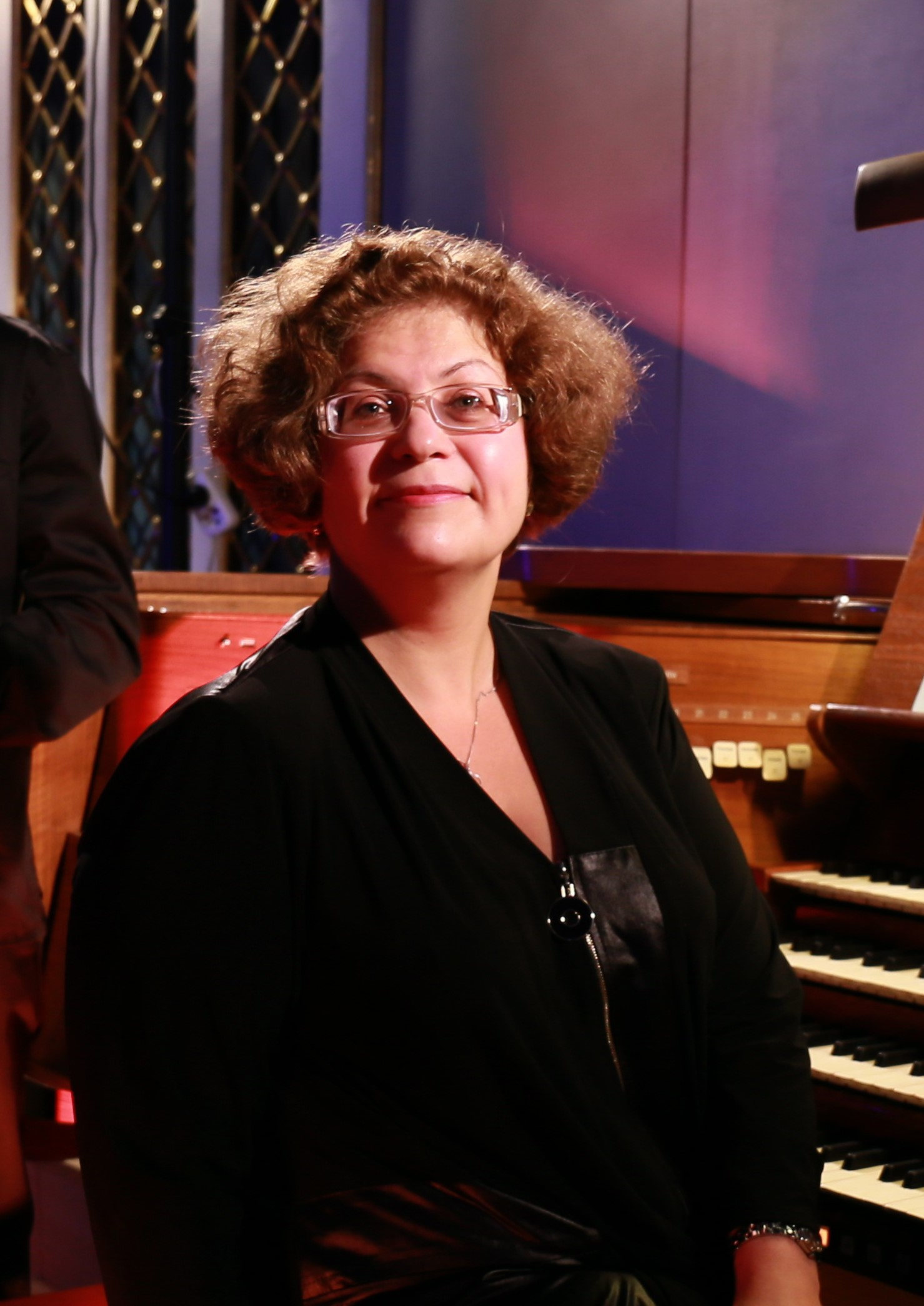

Background information
- Born: Tatiana Andrianova; September 7, 1972 (age 53)
- Origin: Moscow, Russia
- Genres: Academic music
- Occupation: musician
- Instruments: organ, piano

Tatiana Mikhailovna Andrianova (Russian: Татьяна Андрианова; born September 7, 1972) is a Russian concert organist. Member of the ancient music ensemble of the Moscow State University Chamber Orchestra. Artist of the Charity Foundation "Artbene" and a member of the organ community "Prinsipal".

== Biography ==
Born on September 7, 1972, in Moscow. In 1988, she entered the Academic Music School at the Moscow Conservatory, where she graduated with honors in 1991 with a degree in music theory. 1989–1991, she took a course in concertmaster (teacher A. M. Amintayev) and chamber ensemble (teacher A. A. Tyurin). In 1991, Tatiana Andrianova entered the Moscow Conservatory, where she graduated with honors in 1998, majoring in the History of Russian Music (teacher E. M. Levashev) and Organ (teacher S. L. Dizhur). She studied harpsichord under the guidance of T. Zenaishvili. There, in 2000, she completed a postgraduate course (assistant-internship) in the specialty "organ", then trained with L. Shishkhanova.

She took part in master classes of Professors: M. Chapuis, L. Tagliavini, E. Izuar, J. Oortmersen, H. Meister, E. Lisitsina, and also studied at the Summer Organ Academy in Haarlem (Netherlands, 2002, 2004) in master classes of masters: Hans Fagius, Ewald Kooiman, Lorenzo Ghielmi, Joris Verdin.

== Career ==
J.Brahms Prelude and Fugue in g-minor Tatiana Andrianova

In 1987–1990, she studied at the theoretical department of the Music School at the Moscow Conservatory. Among his classmates at the school: Vladimir Jurowski – Russian and British conductor., artistic director of the State Academic Symphony Orchestra of the Russian Federation, chief conductor of the London Philharmonic Orchestra; Anton Yevgenyevich Safronov-Russian and German composer and musicologist, who wrote in the 2010 several annotations to concert programs at the State Academic Symphony Orchestra of the Russian Federation; Andrey Valeryevich Semenov – Russian composer, conductor and actor, member of the Union of Composers of Russia, member of the Union of Theatrical Figures of Russia; Sergey Pavlovich Nevsky-member of the Guild of Composers, Russian and German composer. Since 2000 (since the beginning of her independent concert activity), she has been actively involved in educational and charitable projects. So, with her direct participation and organization, a series of educational concerts was held at the Glinka Museum of Musical Culture, dedicated to the music of the Baroque era. The project lasted for several years (2000–2008), was held in the format of concerts-lectures, both solo and ensemble (together with musicians of the Moscow State University Chamber Orchestra). In the future, she took part in similar educational charity programs of the Moscow State University Chamber Orchestra, held in the halls of the Bogolyubov Art Library, the Museum of Land Studies of Moscow State University, the Russian-German House, in other museums and concert halls, for example, in the Ostankino museum-estate, in the museum complex of the New Jerusalem Monastery, in the House of Scientists of the city of Pushchino, etc. She took part in the international festival of composers "Moscow Autumn" as a performer of works by contemporary composers. In 2007–2009, she participated in educational concerts of the Academy of Church of St. Louis of the French (Moscow). Since 2002, she has been an artist of the "Artbene" Charity Foundation, which supports concerts in various Catholic churches in Russia. She has performed musical works in charity concerts of the "Belcanto" Charitable Foundation. The artist still practices the format of lectures and concerts at the venues where it is supported.

Since 2001, she has been working as an accompanist and organist in the Large Academic Choir of the Russian State Music Television and Radio Center (since November 2005-the Large Academic Choir – "Masters of Choral Singing", artistic director – People's Artist of Russia, Professor L. Z. Kontorovich), taking part in concerts and festivals with the participation of the collective, for example, "Transfiguration" in the city of Yaroslavl, "Moscow Autumn", foreign tours (in particular, in Italy). She was also invited to collaborate with such conductors as V. K. Polyansky (in particular, for a tour in Italy in 2003), Gennady Rozhdestvensky, Teodor Currentzis (festival "Territory", 2007), Michail Jurowski (2018). Conducts concert activities in the cities: Kursk, Vladimir, Orenburg, St. Petersburg, Tula, Kaliningrad, Yuzhno-Sakhalinsk, etc. Artist is a guest organist at the State Academic Symphony Orchestra of the Russian Federation.

Awarded the Certificate of Honor of the Ministry of Communications and Mass Media of the Russian Federation "For Services to the promotion of Russian musical culture and high professional skills.", September 16, 2013.

== Collaboration with creative teams ==
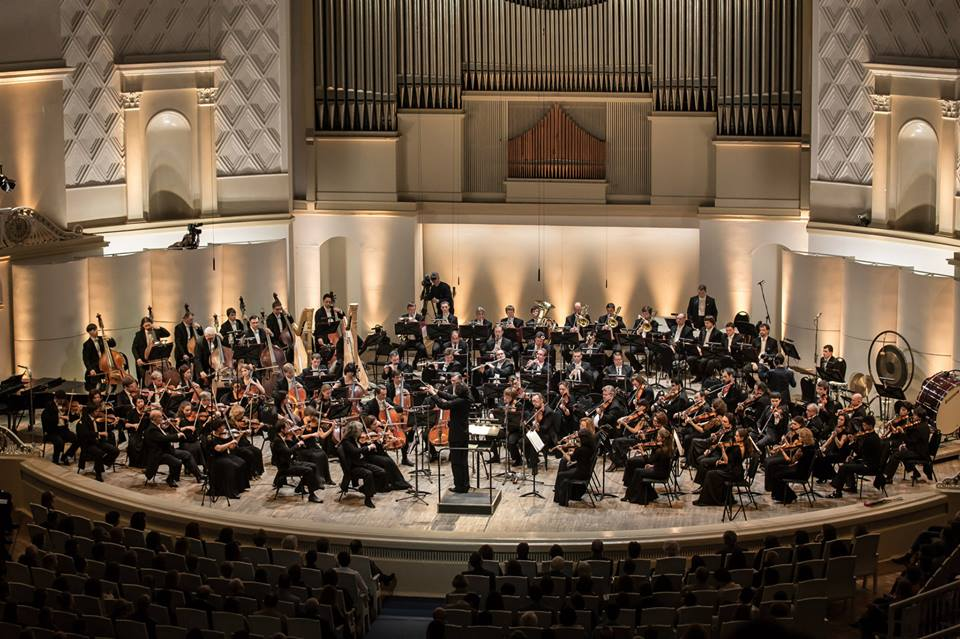
State Academic Symphony Orchestra of the Russian Federation

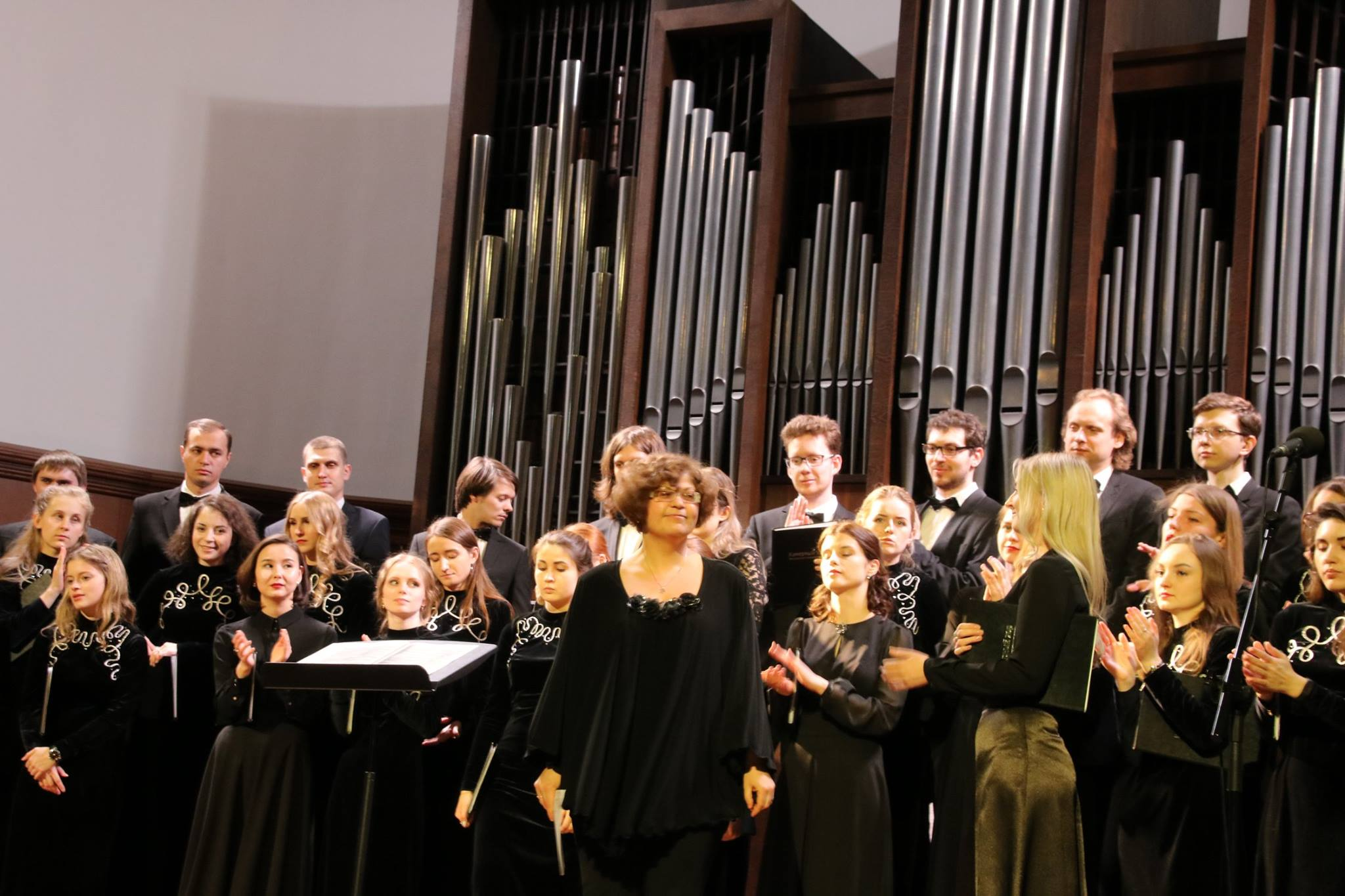
Сoncert in the small hall of the Moscow Conservatory

- State Academic Symphony Orchestra of the Russian Federation
- Chamber Choir of the Moscow Conservatory
- Moscow State University Chamber Orchestra

== Discography ==
- 2008 – "Music is a joy"
- 2010 – "Night at the Conservatory"
- 2023 – "Johannes Brahms. Complete Organ Works"
