= Yurovsky =

Yurovsky, feminine: Yurovsraya, is a Russian surname, a variant of the Polish surname Jurowski. Notable people with the surname include:

- Vladimir Yurovsky
- Yakov Yurovsky (1878–1938), Soviet revolutionary, murderer of the Romanov family
- Yuri Yurovsky

== See also ==
- Yuryevsky
- Gary Yourofsky
- Jurovský
