= Tatiana Andrianova =

Tatiana Andrianova may refer to:

- Tatyana Andrianova (born 1979), Russian middle-distance runner
- Tatiana Andrianova (organist) (born 1972), Russian concert organist
