= Linz State Theatre =

Theatre in Linz, Austria

- Landestheater Linz
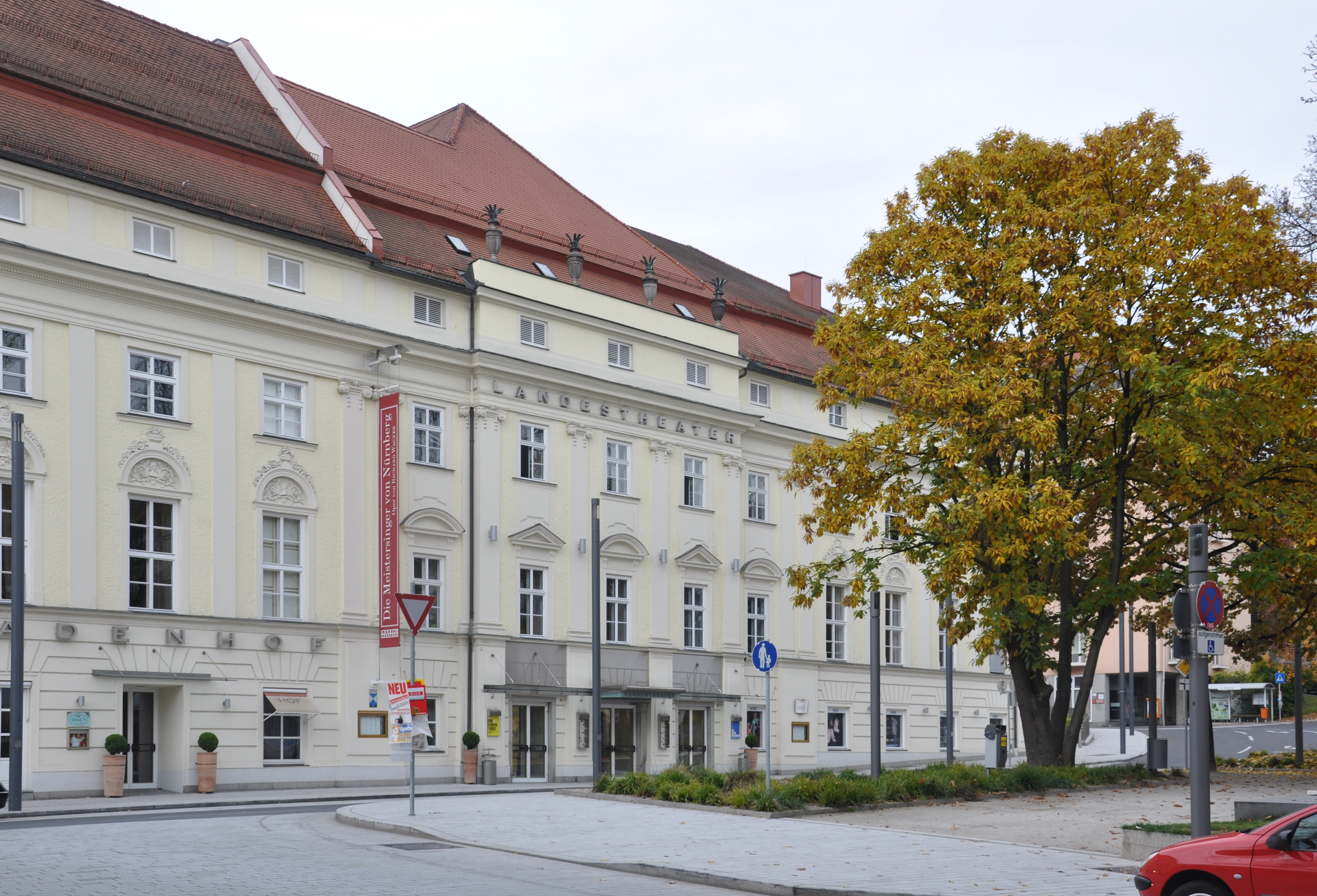
- Schauspielhaus

- Location within Austria
- Location: Linz, Austria
- Coordinates: 48°18′13″N 14°17′00″E
- Type: State Theatre

Website
- Landestheater Linz web site

The Linz State Theatre (Landestheater Linz) is a theatre in Linz, Austria. The largest theater in Upper Austria (OÖ), it consists of three venues: the Musiktheater am Volksgarten, the Schauspielhaus (formerly Großes Haus) and the Kammerspiele on the Promenade in Linz. The theater is managed by OÖ. Theater und Orchester, which also operates the Bruckner Orchester Linz and is wholly owned by the province of Upper Austria via the OÖ Landesholding.

== History ==
Touring troupes performed in the Estates Riding School and in the ballroom on the Promenade. In 1751, the Linz master builder Johann Matthias Krinner made a proposal to the estates to erect their own theater building. The actual initiator of the theater was the provincial attorney (deputy governor) Johann Franz Achaz von Stiebar. From 1752 to 1786, the location at Promenade 39, a converted warehouse, was only a temporary solution for the frequent times when the municipal water theater on the Donaulände in the area of today's Zollamtstraße was unusable due to flooding. The Redoutensaal was converted into a theater hall in 1788 and used for performances during the construction of the new theater.

Between 1801 and 1803, the Landständisches Theater was added to the Redoutensäle at the foot of the Schlossberg and the façade of the entire building was renovated in the Empire style. Emperor Francis II approved the plan for a new theater building, and on his name day, 4 October 1803, the newly built Landständisches Theater was opened. Initially unheated for cost reasons, the theater had to remain closed during harsh winters.

The theater was run by the provincial estates until 1848. As early as 1824, however, this provincial stage was already flourishing in its heyday, although at that time every play had to be submitted to the censors for approval before being performed. Censorship was abolished with the revolution of 1848 and Emperor Ferdinand promised complete freedom from censorship. In the following years, the repertoire included not only operas and plays, but also artistic interludes, which pushed classical music into the background.

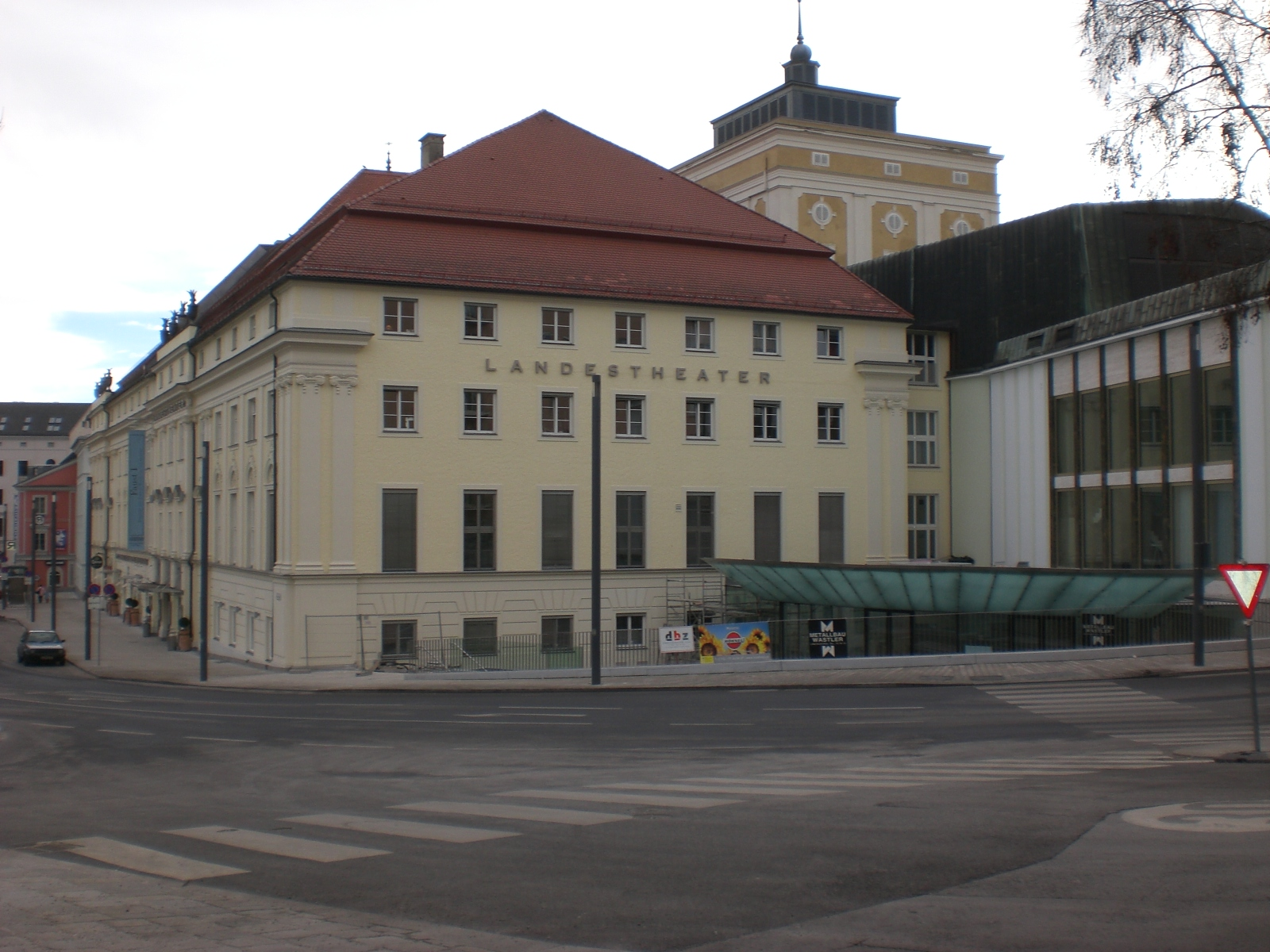
Landestheater Linz, Schauspielhaus Kammerspiele

In the 1920s, opera increasingly came to the fore and became more popular with audiences. A play by Bertolt Brecht was performed here for the first time in Austria in 1923. In the 1930s and 1940s, however, a crisis broke out for the theater due to the impoverishment of the former theater audience, the middle class; younger people preferred the newly fashionable cinema. The city of Linz and the province of Upper Austria took over the sponsorship of the theater in the early 1950s.

Based on designs by architect Clemens Holzmeister, the Kammerspiele was built between 1956 and 1958 with 421 seats and the Grosses Haus was rebuilt in 1957 with 756 seats. In 1973, the Theaterkeller with 100 seats was added which served until the 2016/2017 season, followed in 1998 by the Eisenhand venue with a maximum of 170 seats, which was taken over by Tribüne Linz - Theater am Südbahnhofmarkt in 2013.

In summer 2008, the listed façade of the Linz Landestheater was given back the shade of yellow that the building had in 1803 according to the analysis of the monument conservationists. In 2008/2009, a separate entrance was built from the Landestheater to the Promenaden underground car park, so that visitors to the Kammerspiele and the Grosses Haus can enter the theater with dry feet and without barriers (elevator from the underground car park directly into the theater). To this end, the forecourt of the Kammerspiele was given a full basement and a glass vestibule was built as a new entrance to the Kammerspiele with a direct link to the foyers of the Grosses Haus. The forecourt was redesigned with seating steps as a meeting zone.

In 2016, the Schauspielhaus was renovated, in particular the auditorium and foyers. During this time, the Great Hall of the old building of the Anton Bruckner Private University was used as an alternative venue for the drama production Franz Grillparzer's The Golden Fleece. The reopening premiere of Shakespeare's The Tempest took place on 1 April 2017. In the 2017/18 season, the former orchestra rehearsal hall on the Promenade was opened as a new studio stage for drama and young theater, replacing the previous venue.

On April 11, 2013, the Musiktheater Linz am Volksgarten was opened in the centre of Linz. For two seasons (2014/2015 and 2015/2016), an arena stage was built over the first floor as a temporary stage for plays. The tin roof of the Kammerspiele was crumpled by a storm in March 2023 and the roof was subsequently demolished.

== World premieres ==
- 1942 – Heimkehr nach Mittenwald, operetta by Ludwig Schmidseder
- 1944 – Linzer Torte, operetta by Schmidseder
- 1951 – G’schichten aus dem Salzkammergut, operetta by August Pepöck
- 1952 – Mädel aus der Wachau, operetta by Schmidseder
- 1964 – Roulette der Herzen, operetta by Igo Hofstetter
- 1968 – Alles spricht von Charpillon, operetta by Hofstetter
- 1989 – Die goldenen Zwanziger, musical by Fridolin Dallinger
- 2009 – Kepler, opera by Philip Glass
- 2009 – Picknick im Felde, opera in one act by Constantinos Stylianou
- 2013 – Spuren der Verirrten, opera by Glass
- 2016 – Terra Nova oder das weiße Leben, opera by Moritz Eggert
- 2016 – In 80 Tagen um die Welt, musical by Gisle Kverndokk and Øystein Wiik
- 2019 – Der Hase mit den Bernsteinaugen, musical by Thomas Zaufke and Henry Mason

== Theatre directors ==
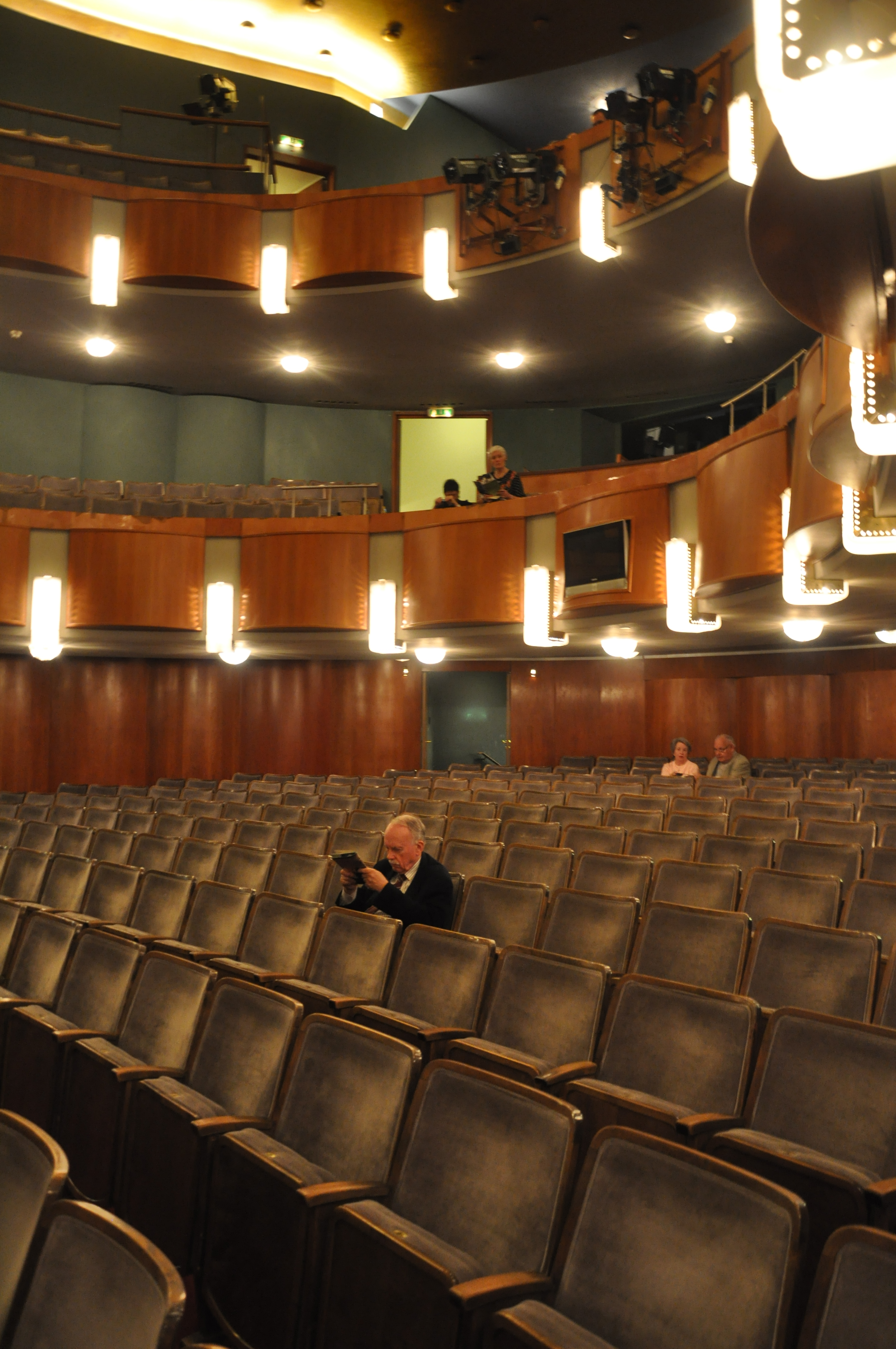
Interior of the Schauspielhaus

Theatre directors and intendants are as follows:

- Johann Georg Dengler (1798/1803–1804)
- Franz Xaver Glöggl (May–October 1804
- Franz Graf Füger (1804–1811 and 1814–1818)
- Josef Miré (1811–1814)
- Karl August Schütz (1818–1819)
- Nikolaus Alois Hölzel (1819–1824)
- Josef Pellet (1824–1833 and 1839–1843)
- Eduard Neufeld (1833–1835, 1843–1849 and 1852)
- Heinrich Börnstein (1833/35–1839)
- Franz Stöckl (1849–1852)
- Maria Rosner (1852)
- Andreas August Pütz (1852–1855)
- Ida Schuselka-Brüning (1855–1857)
- Eduard Kreibig (1857–1863)
- Carl Clement (1863–1864)
- Carl Pichler-Bodog (1864–1865)
- Hermann Sallmayer (1866–1867)
- Franz Thomé (1867–1870)
- Betty Weiß (1870–1873)
- Heinrich Hirsch (1873–1875)
- Joseph Kotzian (1875–1881)
- Julius Laska (1884–1891)
- Alfred Cavar (1897–1903)
- Hans Claar (1906–1918)
- Max Höller (1918–1920 and 1922–1924)
- Paul Wrede (1920–1922)
- Heinrich Hagin (1924)
- Albert Hugelmann (1925–1930)
- Ignaz Brantner (1932–1945 and 1948–1953)
- Viktor Pruscha (1945–1948)
- Oskar Walleck (1953–1956)
- Fred Schroer (1957–1964)
- Kurt Wöss, Alfred Stögmüller and Adolf Holschan (1964–1969)
- Alfred Stögmüller (1969–1986)
- Roman Zeilinger (1986–1998)
- Michael Klügl (1998–2006)
- Rainer Mennicken (2006–2016)
- Hermann Schneider (since 2016)

== Bibliography ==
- Wimmer, Heinrich: Das Linzer Landestheater 1945–1951. In: Land Oberösterreich (Hrsg.): Oberösterreichische Heimatblätter. Linz, 1952, ISSN 0029-7550. Accessed via PDF at Ooegeschichte.at. (In German)
