= The Gamblers (Gogol) =

The Gamblers (Russian: «Игроки») is an 1840 play by Nikolai Gogol. Dmitri Shostakovich tried to compose an opera of the same title based upon the play.

== History ==
The play was first published in a publication called "The Works of Nikolai Gogol" in 1842. This publication was the fourth section of "Dramatic Excerpts and Other Scenes". The whole section was dated by Gogol himself from 1832 to 1837. The final version of "The Gamblers" was released in 1842 but the play had been in the works before then.

When he sent the play from Germany to Nikolai Prokopovich on August 29, 1842, Gogol wrote

"I am now sending the play "The Gamblers" which I forcefully collected. The draft was written so long ago and it was so incomprehensible that it was terrible to work with."

== Plot ==
Ikharev, a gambler who had just won 80 thousand rubles checks into an inn in a small Russian town. Three gamblers staying there meet him over a game of cards and quickly identify him as a fellow card sharp. They propose to join forces: Mr. Glov, a rich landowner is in town waiting to collect 200,000 rubles from a bank. He has to go back to his estate leaving his hotheaded son in charge. Glov Jr. quickly loses the 200,000 rubles to the gamblers. Since he doesn't have the money, yet he gives them a promissory note. An official informs them that cashing the note would take 2 weeks. The 3 gamblers need cash immediately so they offer Ikharev a deal: he would give them his 80,000 cash winnings and he can keep the 200,000 note. Ikharev boasts that he just made as much money in a day as others make in a lifetime. Once the trio leaves town with his money Ikharev is told "the Glovs" and the official were their accomplices in an elaborate plot to part him with his winnings. He realizes he cannot go to the police as he was complicit in an illegal card game.

== Characters ==
- Ikharev
- Peter Petrovich Shvohnev
- Colonel Krugel
- Stepan Ivanovich the Consoling
- Mikhail Alexandrovich Glov, Bogus Landlord
- Alexander Mikhaily Glov, Son of Glov
- Psoy Stakhich Zamukhryshkin, an official
- Gavryushka, Servant of Ikharev
- Alexei, Tavern Servant
