= Das goldene Kreuz =

German-language opera by Ignaz Brüll in two acts

- Opera by Ignaz Brüll
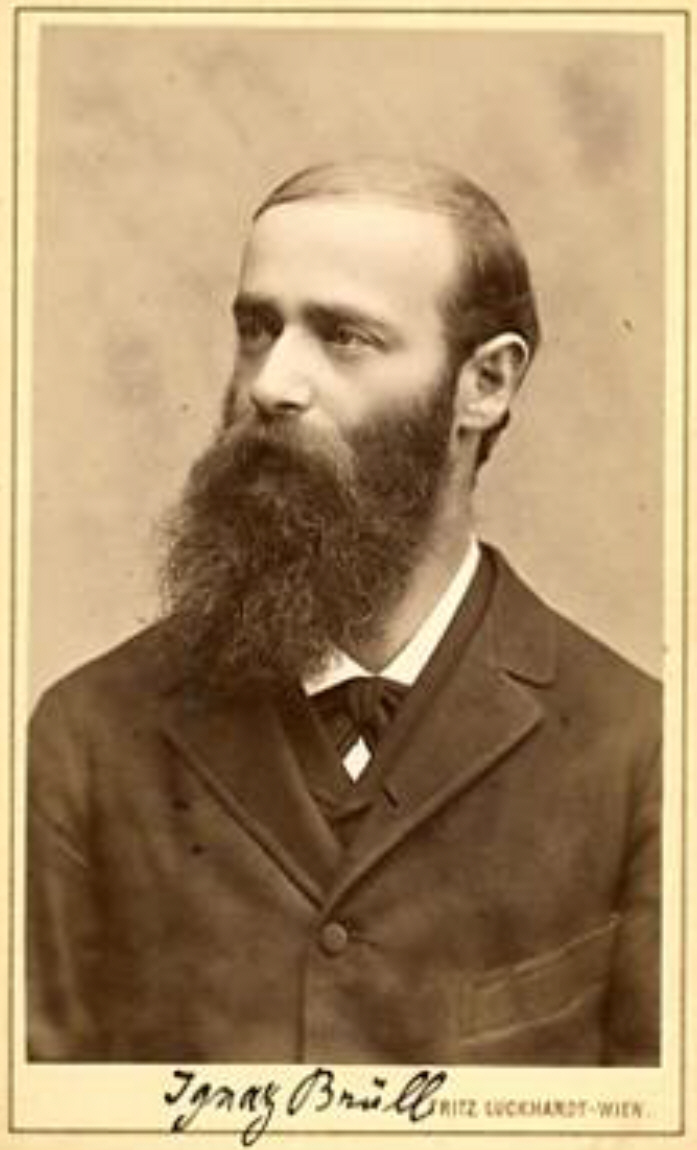
- The composer
- Translation: The Golden Cross
- Librettist: Salomon Hermann Mosenthal
- Language: German
- Based on: story by Mélesville
- Premiere: 22 December 1875; Berlin Court Opera

Das goldene Kreuz (The Golden Cross) is a German-language opera by Ignaz Brüll in two acts, with a libretto by Salomon Hermann Mosenthal. It premiered in Berlin in 1875 and was a huge success, later playing on many stages around the world including London and New York City, where it was equally well-received.

== History ==
Ignaz Brüll was an Austrian pianist and composer who became associated with the circle around Johannes Brahms in Vienna. He taught at the Horáksche Klavierschulen in Berlin. He composed Das goldene Kreuz as his second opera. The libretto of the comic opera in the singspiel tradition was written in German by Salomon Hermann Mosenthal who had also written the libretto for Otto Nicolai's The Merry Wives of Windsor. Das goldene Kreuz is based on a story by Mélesville which involves an emotional drama of mistaken identities during the Napoleonic Wars.

Das goldene Kreuz premiered in Berlin at the court opera on 22 December 1875 with huge success. Lilli Lehmann appeared as Christine. Brüll received personal compliments from the emperor, Wilhelm I. More than 180 stages showed the opera, including London (translated into English) in 1878 by the Carl Rosa Opera Company, and the Metropolitan Opera in New York City where it was presented in 1886. In 19th-century reviews, the opera was ranked along with Bizet's Carmen, Goldmark's Die Königin von Saba, Hermann Goetz's Der Widerspänstigen Zähmung and Nessler's Der Rattenfänger von Hameln. The opera was described in an opera guide of 1907. It was performed often in Germany until it was banned by the Nazi regime due to the composer's Jewish origins.

== Roles ==
Roles, voice types, premiere cast
| Role | Voice type | Premiere cast |
|---|---|---|
| Gontran de l'Ancre, a young nobleman | lyric tenor | |
| Nicolas Pariset, innkeeper | baritone | |
| Christine, his sister | lyric soprano | Lilli Lehmann |
| Therese, his cousin and fiancée | mezzo-soprano | Louise Horina |
| Bombardon, sergeant | bass buffo | |
| Soldiers, farmers | | |
