= Vladimir Urbanovich =

Russian opera singer (1938–2023)

- Born: Vladimir Nikolayevich Urbanovich; 8 July 1938; Usolye-Sibirskoye, Irkutsk Oblast, Russian SFSR, USSR
- Died: 1 November 2023 (aged 85); Novosibirsk, Russia
- Occupations: Opera singer, pedagogue
- Years active: 1964–2016
- Awards: People’s Artist of the RSFSR

Vladimir Nikolayevich Urbanovich (Russian: Владимир Николаевич Урбанович; 8 July 1938 – 1 November 2023) was a Soviet and Russian baritone and musical pedagogue. People's Artist of the RSFSR (1983).

== Biography ==
From 1965 onwards, Urbanovich was a soloist at the Novosibirsk Opera and Ballet Theater. He performed more than 60 parts of the baritone repertoire in opera classics and modern works. He toured in Poland (1986), Egypt (1993), Portugal (1996), participated in the production of Boris Godunov at the Baden Theater (Germany, 1994). He starred in several television film operas, including Yuri Butsko's Diary of a Madman.

Urbanovich also performed as a concert singer, and taught at the Novosibirsk Conservatory.

Urbanovich died in Novosibirsk on 1 November 2023, at the age of 85.
