= The Gamblers (Shostakovich) =

1942 unfinished opera by Dmitri Shostakovich

- Unfinished opera by Dmitri Shostakovich
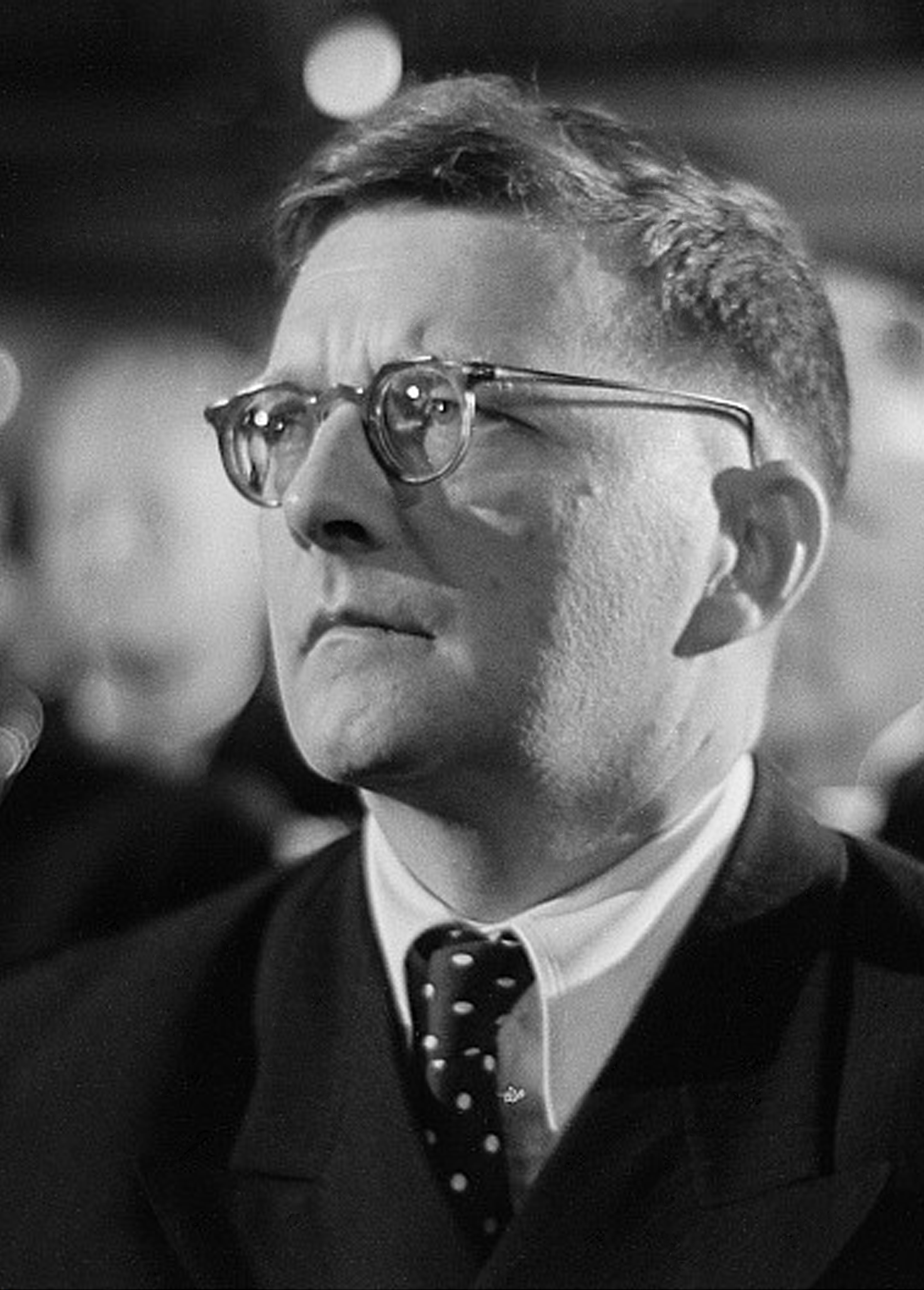
- Dmitri Shostakovich in 1950
- Native title: Russian: Игроки, romanized: Igroki
- Librettist: Shostakovich
- Language: Russian
- Based on: The Gamblers by Nikolai Gogol
- Premiere: 18 September 1978 (concert performance); Leningrad Conservatory

The Gamblers (Russian: Игроки, romanized: Igroki), Op. 63, is an unfinished opera, composed by Dmitri Shostakovich in 1941/42 to his own libretto based on Nikolai Gogol's comedy The Gamblers (1842). The surviving first act lasts around 47 minutes. Krzysztof Meyer realised a completion in German, Die Spieler, in 1981. Both versions were performed on stage and recorded.

== History ==
Shostakovich based his first opera, The Nose, on a satirical short story by Nikolai Gogol. For The Gamblers, he turned again to the same author, this time to the play The Gamblers. Shostakovich tried to set Gogol's play word for word. He realised when arriving at the end of the first act that the opera would become too long and unwieldy, and also that its mocking text and the bitter irony of the music would not be performed under the repressive regime at the time. He abandoned the project. He reused material from the opera in the scherzo of his final composition, the Viola Sonata.

The world premiere was a concert performance at the hall of the Leningrad Conservatory on 18 September 1978, sung by members of the Moscow Chamber Theatre with the Leningrad Philharmonic Orchestra conducted by Gennady Rozhdestvensky. A new staged performance was played at the New Opera Moscow in 2016, conducted by Andrey Lebedev.

== Meyer completion ==
The opera was completed in 1981 by the Polish composer Krzysztof Meyer as Die Spieler, arriving at a duration of about two hours. It was first staged in German at the Opernhaus Wuppertal on 12 June 1983, conducted by Tristan Schick. This version was first recorded in 1995 by the Nordwestdeutsche Philharmonie, conducted by Michail Jurowski, with an all-Russian cast from the Bolshoi Theatre, singing in Russian led by tenor Vladimir Bogachov.

== Roles ==
In the completed opera, nine characters appear, all men. The first act by Shostakovich has the first six roles.

Roles, voice types
Role	Voice type
Icharjev, estate owner	tenor
Uteshitelny, decent nobleman	baritone
Shvochnjev, nobleman	bass
Krugel, colonel	tenor
Michail Glov, decent head of a family	bass
Alexander Glov, student	tenor
Gavrjushka, Icharjev's servant	bass
Alexej, waiter	bass
Samuchryshkin, civil servant	baritone

== Plot ==
The scene is in an inn in a Russian provincial town. Icharjev, a card sharp, arrives and inquires about other guests, learning from the waiter that three other gamblers, Uteshitelnyj, Shvochnjev and Krugel, a German-born colonel, are among the guests. Weeks before, Icharjev had deceived a military officer in gambling, and won 80,000 rubles.

Icharjev is friendly with the other three, and introduces his game called Adelaida Ivanovna. He impresses the others by knowing their hands. They decide to deceive someone else, and find a victim in Michail Glov, an elderly estate owner. Glov mortgaged his property for 200,000 rubles, but is waiting for the money. He does not gamble, but empowered his son Alexander, 22 years old, to conduct business for him.

The four gamblers win 200,000 rubles from Alexander, but as he has no cash, he makes out a bill. Uteshitelnyj bribes a civil servant. With the two others, he leaves for "urgent business", passing the bill to Icharjev, who pays 80,000 rubles in cash. After they have left, Alexander Glov informs him that they all are members of a gang of card sharps who outwitted Icharjev.

== Recordings ==
- Shostakovich The Gamblers, Bolshoi Theatre Orchestra, cond. Andrei Chistyakov (1995) OCLC 46339426
- Shostakovich The Gamblers, with the same composer's The Nose, cond. Gennady Rozhdestvensky OCLC 182779514
- Shostakovich The Gamblers; with Veniamin Fleishman's Rothschild's Violin. Royal Liverpool Philharmonic, Vasily Petrenko 2008 OCLC 705325347
- Shostakovich/Meyer Die Spieler (completion) cond. Michail Jurowski, Nordwestdeutsche Philharmonie, Capriccio Records (1995) OCLC 695892714
