= Novosibirsk Conservatory =

- Новосибирская консерватория
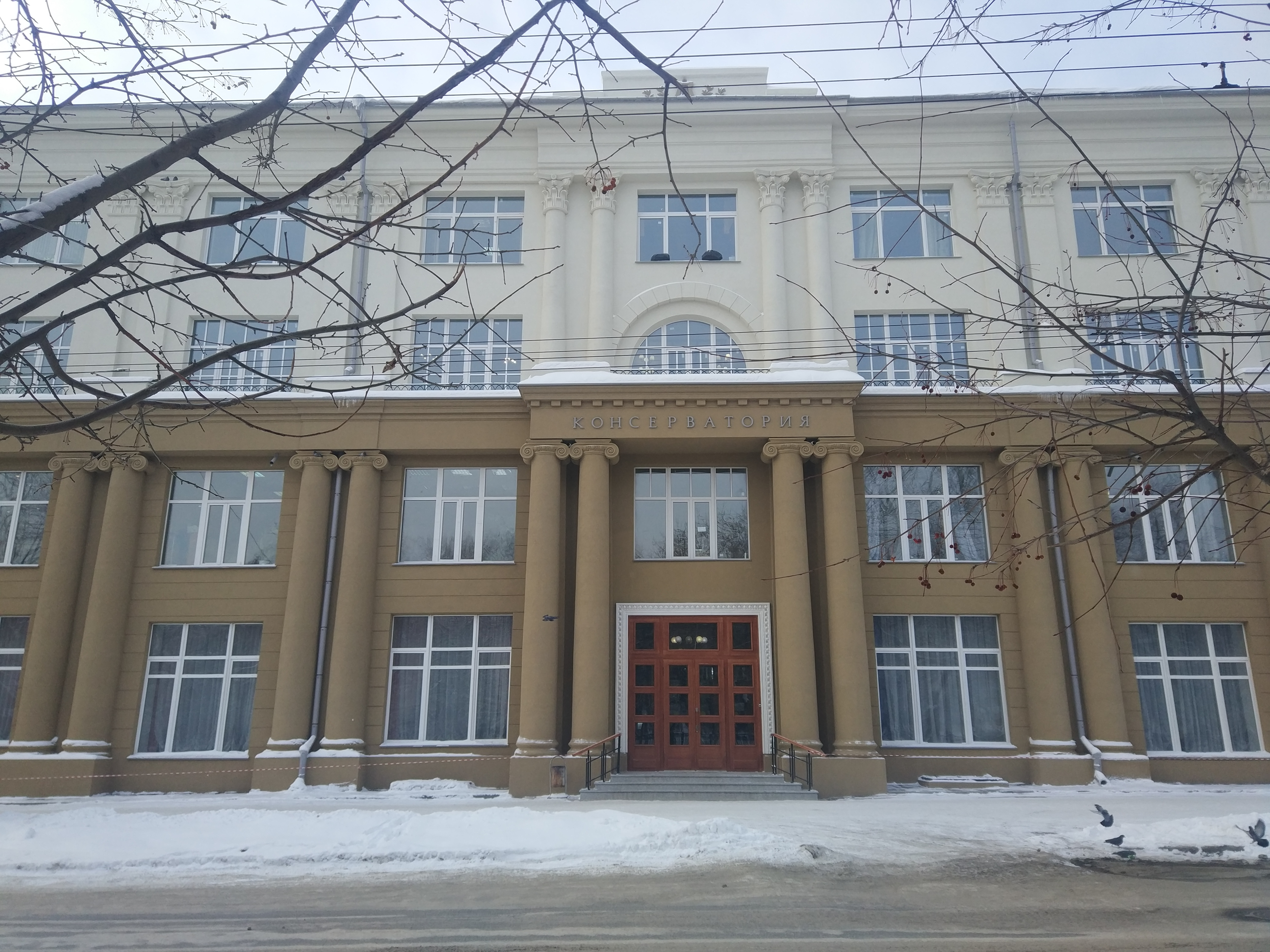
- Type: conservatoire
- Established: 1956
- Rector: Zhanna Lavelina
- Location: (Russia) Novosibirsk, Novosibirsk Oblast, Russia; 55.0283°N 82.9166°E

Novosibirsk State Conservatory named after M. I. Glinka is an educational music institution in Novosibirsk, Russia. It was founded in 1956.

== History ==
The conservatory was opened in 1956. In 1981, the museum opened in the conservatory.

== Notable teachers ==
- Teofils Biķis (1975–1989), pianist
- Zakhar Bron (1974–?), violinist
- Vladimir Urbanovich (1970–1979), opera singer
- Yuri Yukechev (since 1970), composer

== Notable students ==
- Vladimir Galouzine, opera singer
- Galina Gorchakova, opera singer
- Mark Gorenstein, conductor
- Vadim Repin, violinist

Lev isaacovich Gurevich, violinist

== Bibliography ==
- Ламин В. А. (2003). Энциклопедия. Новосибирск. Новосибирск: Новосибирское книжное издательство. p. 596. ISBN 5-7620-0968-8.
