= Teofils Biķis =

Latvian pianist

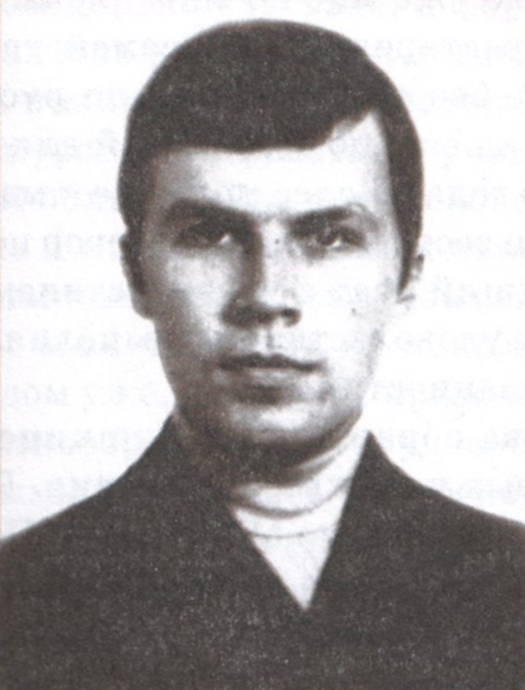

Background information
- Born: 30 August 1952; Rucava, Latvian SSR, Soviet Union
- Died: 2 November 2000 (aged 48) Riga, Latvia
- Genres: Classical
- Occupation: Pianist
- Instrument: Piano

Teofils Biķis (Note: Latvian: Teofils Biķis; Russian: Теофил Карлович Бикис, romanized: Teofil Karlovich Bikis) (30 August 1952 – 2 November 2000) was a Latvian pianist.

He born in Rucava and was trained at the Moscow Conservatory under Lev Vlassenko, graduating in 1975. That same year he won the Vianna da Motta International Music Competition and was appointed a teacher at the Novosibirsk Conservatory. In 1989 he was promoted to the Latvian Academy of Music, where he held a professorship and led the piano department. He served subsequently as the president of the European Piano Teachers Association's Latvian branch.

Competition record
1968	(Soviet Union) II Ciurlionis iRPC	3rd Prize	ex aequo with (Moldavian Soviet Socialist Republic) Raimonda Šeinfeld
1975	(Portugal) VI Vianna da Motta IMC	1st Prize	ex aequo with (United States) William de Van
