= Jurkowski =

Jurkowski (Polish pronunciation: [jurˈkɔfski]; feminine: Jurkowska; plural: Jurkowscy) is a Polish-language surname which appears in different forms in other countries.

| Language | Masculine | Feminine |
|---|---|---|
| Polish | Jurkowski | Jurkowska |
| Belarusian (Romanization) | Юркоўскі (Jurkoŭski, Yurkouski, Iurkouski) | Юркоўская (Jurkoŭskaja, Yurkouskaya, Iurkouskaia) |
| Czech, Slovak | Jurkovský | Jurkovská |
| Lithuanian | Jurkauskas | Jurkauskienė (married); Jurkauskaitė (unmarried) |
| Russian (Romanization) | Юрковский (Yurkovsky, Yurkovskiy, Iurkovskii, Jurkovskij) | Юрковская (Yurkovskaya, Yurkovskaia, Iurkovskaia, Jurkovskaja) |
| Ukrainian (Romanization) | Юрковський (Yurkovskyi, Yurkovskyy, Iurkovskyi, Jurkovskyj) | Юрковська (Yurkovska, Iurkovska, Jurkovska) |

== People ==
- Jan Jurkowski (born 1989), Polish actor, filmmaker, and YouTuber
- Katarzyna Jurkowska-Kowalska (born 1992), Polish artistic gymnast
- Kenneth Jurkowski (born 1981), American rower
- Ryszard Jurkowski (born 1945), Polish architect and urban planner
- Maria Fyodorovna Andreyeva, stage name of Maria Fyodorovna Yurkovskaya (1868–1953), Russian actress and Bolshevik administrator

== See also ==
- Jurowski
