= Vladimir Galouzine =

Russian opera singer

Vladimir Vasilyevich Galouzine (Russian: Владимир Васильевич Галузин, Vladimir Galuzin, pronounced [vlɐˈdʲimʲɪr ɡɐˈluzʲɪn]), born June 11, 1956, is a Russian tenor. He has performed in such Russian operas as The Queen of Spades, Boris Godunov and Khovanshchina and has performed the lead tenor roles in Italian operas including Madama Butterfly, Otello, Tosca, Aida, and Manon Lescaut.

== Career ==
Galouzine was born in Rubtsovsk, Soviet Union, a town near Novosibirsk. In 1981, after graduating from the Novosibirsk Conservatory, he joined the Novosibirsk Opera.

From 1990 to 2012 he worked regularly with the Mariinsky Opera under Valery Gergiev. His first leading role with the company was the title role in Verdi’s Otello in 1991. In 1993, he debuted as Hermann in Tchaikovsky's The Queen of Spades, a role which he has reprised several times in both Russian and French. He has also performed the title roles in Verdi’s Don Carlo and Rimsky-Korsakov’s Sadko, Radames in Verdi's Aïda, Calaf in Puccini’s Turandot, Des Grieux in Puccini's Manon Lescaut, Cavaradossi in Puccini's Tosca, Alexey in Prokofiev’s The Gambler, Sergey in Shostakovich’s Lady Macbeth of Mtsensk, Khovansky in Mussorgsky's Khovanschina, Canio in Leoncavallo’s I Pagliacci.

He has also performed internationally in many locations.

In 2007, Galouzine was awarded with the honorary title of People's Artist of Russia.

== Personal life ==
Vladimir married soprano Nataliya Timchenko.
