= Mark Gorenstein =

Russian conductor

Mark Borisovich Gorenstein
- Марк Борисович Горенштейн
- Born: September 16, 1946 (age 79)
- Education: Novosibirsk Conservatory, Conservatory in Chișinău
- Occupation: Conductor

Mark Borisovich Gorenstein (Russian: Марк Борисович Горенштейн; born 16 September 1946) is a Russian conductor. He grew up in Odesa and studied at the conservatory in Chișinău. He later played violin in the Bolshoi Theatre Orchestra and the State Academic Symphony Orchestra of the then USSR.

Gorenstein studied conducting in the Novosibirsk Conservatory. He was principal conductor of the MÁV Symphony Orchestra in Budapest from 1985 to 1988, of the Busan Philharmonic Orchestra from 1989 to 1992 (the first non-Korean conductor to hold the post), and the Molodaya Rossia Orchestra (ru:Государственный симфонический оркестр «Новая Россия»). He received a People's Artist of Russia award in 2002 and the Order of Merit for the Fatherland in 2006.

Gorenstein became music director of the State Academic Symphony Orchestra of the Russian Federation in 2002. In 2011, controversy arose after Gorenstein made disparaging remarks about cellist Narek Hakhnazaryan at the Tchaikovsky International Competition in June 2011, which led to his removal as conductor for the competition. The orchestra then demanded Gorenstein's dismissal from the orchestra, with accusations of abusive behaviour. Gorenstein was subsequently dismissed from the orchestra in September 2011. He is currently principal guest conductor of the Novosibirsk State Academic Symphony Orchestra.

Gorenstein has conducted commercial recordings of works of Shostakovich and Schnittke.

Cultural offices
Preceded by Jong-Hyeok Park	Principal Conductor, Busan Philharmonic Orchestra; 1985-1988	Succeeded by Vladimir Kin
Preceded by Vassily Sinaisky	Music Director, State Academic Symphony Orchestra of the Russian Federation; 2002-2011	Succeeded by Vladimir Jurowski
