= Vladimir Jurowski =

Russian and British conductor (born 1972)

- Владимир Михайлович Юровский
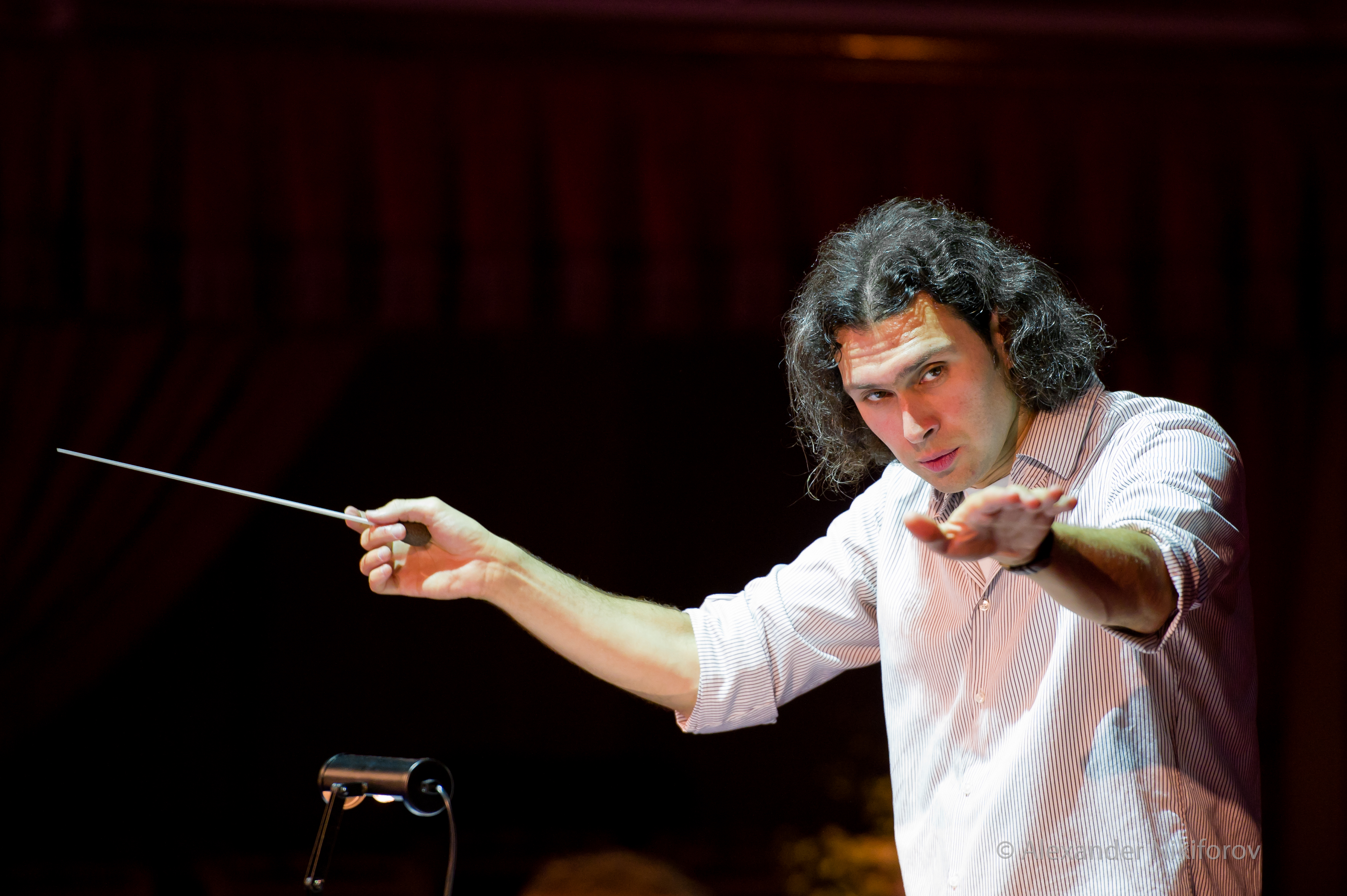
- Born: 4 April 1972 (age 54); Moscow, Russia
- Citizenship: Russia • Germany
- Education: Tchaikovsky Academic Music College at the Moscow State Conservatory
- Occupation: conductor
- Spouse: Patricia Jurowski
- Children: 2
- Father: Michail Jurowski
- Relatives: Dmitri Jurowski (brother); Vladimir Mikhailovich Yurovsky (grandfather)

Vladimir Mikhailovich Jurowski (Russian: Владимир Михайлович Юровский; born 4 April 1972) is a Russian conductor resident in Germany. He is the son of conductor Michail Jurowski, and grandson of Soviet film music composer Vladimir Mikhailovich Yurovsky.

== Early life ==
Born in Moscow, Jurowski began his musical studies at the Tchaikovsky Academic Music College at the Moscow State Conservatory. In 1990, he moved with his family, including his brother Dmitri (conductor) and his sister Maria (pianist) to Germany, where he completed his education at the music schools at the Hochschule für Musik Carl Maria von Weber Dresden and the Hochschule für Musik Hanns Eisler. He studied conducting with Rolf Reuter and vocal coaching with Semion Skigin. He participated in a conducting master class with Sir Colin Davis on Sibelius' Symphony No. 7 in 1991.

== Career ==
Jurowski first appeared on the international scene in 1995 at the Wexford Festival, where he conducted Nikolai Rimsky-Korsakov's opera May Night, and he returned the following year for Giacomo Meyerbeer's L'étoile du nord, which was recorded by Naxos Records. In April 1996, he made his debut at the Royal Opera House, Covent Garden, conducting Nabucco.

He joined the ensemble of the Komische Oper Berlin, for the 1996/1997 season, as an assistant to Yakov Kreizberg and second Kapellmeister. He received the title first Kapellmeister a year later, and continued to work there full-time until 2001. He was the principal guest conductor of the Teatro Comunale di Bologna between 2000 and 2003.

In August 2000, Jurowski was named the Music Director of the Glyndebourne Festival Opera, and he took on the post in January 2001. His conducting debut with the London Philharmonic Orchestra (LPO) was in December 2001. In 2003, he was appointed the LPO's Principal Guest Conductor. Jurowski was reported to have been offered the music directorship of Welsh National Opera upon the 2004 departure of Carlo Rizzi, but he declined the position. His tenure with Glyndebourne was highly acclaimed, and Jurowski has spoken of the favourable working conditions at Glyndebourne. Jurowski concluded his Glyndebourne tenure after the 2013 season.

Jurowski has described his preparation process for his opera performances; firstly reading the libretto or the book on which it is based, composing his own sounds in his head while doing so:

"I try to identify with the composer and understand their various decisions... I then interact with the composer by learning the score", first singing at the piano then by studying the orchestral score. He added that "[i]n an ideal world, the theatrical and the musical aspects of the production should be inseparable. The should be completely fused... If you can tell them apart [...] something went amiss, was miscalculated or not taken care of".

In May 2006, Jurowski was announced as the 11th Principal Conductor of the LPO, effective with the 2007/2008 season, with an initial contract of 5 years. Several CD recordings of Jurowski conducting the LPO have been released. In April 2007, Jurowski was one of eight conductors of British orchestras to endorse the 10-year classical music outreach manifesto, "Building on Excellence: Orchestras for the 21st Century", to increase the presence of classical music in the UK, including giving free entry to all British schoolchildren to a classical music concert. In May 2007, Jurowski received the 2007 Royal Philharmonic Society Music Award for Conductor of the Year. In May 2010, the LPO announced the extension of his principal conductorship through the 2014–15 season. In September 2014, the LPO announced the further extension of his contract as principal conductor through 2018. Jurowski is also a Principal Artist of the Orchestra of the Age of Enlightenment. He stood down as principal conductor of the LPO at the close of the 2020–2021 season. In August 2021, the Royal Philharmonic Society announced Jurowski as the recipient of the Royal Philharmonic Society Gold Medal for 2021, on the occasion of his final concert as principal conductor of the LPO.

Jurowski has served as a member of the Russian National Orchestra Conductor Collegium. In October 2011, the State Academic Symphony Orchestra of the Russian Federation announced the appointment of Jurowski as its principal conductor, with immediate effect, for an initial contract of 3 years. Jurowski concluded his principal conductorship of the State Academic Symphony Orchestra of the Russian Federation in 2021.

In September 2015, the Berlin Radio Symphony Orchestra announced the appointment of Jurowski as its next chief conductor, effective with the 2017–2018 season. In April 2019, the Berlin Radio Symphony Orchestra announced the extension of Jurowski's contract as chief conductor through the 2022–2023 season. In June 2021, the orchestra announced a further extension of Jurowski's contract through 31 August 2027. In September 2025, the orchestra announced a two-year extension of Jurowski's contract through 2029.

Jurowski became Generalmusikdirektor of the Bavarian State Opera for its 2021–2022 season, with an initial contract to run through to 2026. In June 2024, the company announced the extension of Jurowski's contract as GMD through the close of the 2027–2028 season, with the expectation at the time that Jurowski was to stand down as GMD at the close of the 2027-2028 season.In July 2025, the Bavarian Ministry of Science, Research and Art announced a one-year extension of Jurowski's contract as GMD, through the 2028-2029 season, with Jurowski expected to close his tenure as GMD at the end of the 2028-2029 season.

In the United States, Jurowski first conducted at the Metropolitan Opera in December 1999. He made an acclaimed conducting debut with the Philadelphia Orchestra in October 2005. He returned in February 2007 to Philadelphia for a second guest conducting engagement which also received critical praise. Jurowski returned to Philadelphia Orchestra for guest-conducting appearances in March 2009, October 2009, March 2010, November 2011, February 2014, and October 2014.

== Personal life ==
Jurowski and his wife Patricia have two children, Martha and Juri. The family resides in Berlin. In February 2024, Jurowski was appointed as an Honorary Knight Commander of the Order of the British Empire (KBE). The honour was conferred by King Charles III on the advice of the Foreign Secretary, David Cameron, in recognition of his services to music and the arts.

== Selected discography ==
- Rachmaninov – The Isle of the Dead, Symphonic Dances. London Philharmonic Orchestra. LPO–0004 (2005).
- Tchaikovsky – Suite No.3 in G, Op. 55, and Stravinsky – Divertimento. Russian National Orchestra. PENTATONE PTC 5186061 (2005).
- Tchaikovsky – Manfred Symphony. London Philharmonic Orchestra. LPO–0009 (2006).
- Shostakovich – Symphonies Nos. 1 and 6. Russian National Orchestra. PENTATONE PTC 5186068 (2006).
- Prokofiev – Symphony No. 5 and Ode to the End of the War. Russian National Orchestra. PENTATONE PTC 5186083 (2007).
- Tchaikovsky – Hamlet and Romeo and Juliet. Russian National Orchestra. PENTATONE PTC 5186330 (2008).
- Britten – Double Concerto for Violin and Viola (edited by Colin Matthews), Variations on a Theme of Frank Bridge, Les Illuminations. Sally Matthews (soprano), Pieter Schoeman (violin), Alexander Zemtsov (viola); London Philharmonic Orchestra. LPO–0037 (2009).
- Tchaikovsky – Symphonies Nos 1 and 6. London Philharmonic Orchestra. LPO–0039 (2009).
- Brahms – Symphonies Nos 1 and 2. London Philharmonic Orchestra. LPO–0043 (2010).
- Holst – The Planets. London Philharmonic Orchestra and Choir. LPO 0047 (2010).
- Vaughan Williams – The First Nowell, J S Bach – Cantata No. 63 (Christen, ätzet diesen Tag), Mendelssohn – Vom Himmel hoch. Lisa Milne (soprano), Ruxandra Donose (mezzo-soprano), Andrew Staples (tenor), Christopher Maltman (baritone); London Philharmonic Orchestra and Choir. LPO 0050 (2010).
- Haydn – Seven Last Words of our Saviour on the Cross. Lisa Milne (soprano), Ruxandra Donose (mezzo-soprano), Andrew Kennedy (tenor), Christopher Maltman (baritone); London Philharmonic Orchestra and Choir. LPO 0051 (2011).
- Mahler – Symphony No 2. Adriana Kučerová (soprano), Christianne Stotijn (mezzo-soprano); London Philharmonic Orchestra and Choir. LPO 0054 (2011).
- Honegger – Pastorale d'été, Symphony No. 4 ('Deliciæ Basiliensis'), Une cantate de Noël. London Philharmonic Orchestra. LPO–0058 (2011).
- Tchaikovsky – Symphonies Nos 4 & 5. London Philharmonic Orchestra. LPO–0064 (2012).
- Mahler – Symphony No 1, with 'Blumine' movement. London Philharmonic Orchestra. LPO–0070 (2013).
- Brahms – Symphonies Nos 3 & 4. London Philharmonic Orchestra. LPO–0075 (2014).
- Shostakovich – Symphonies Nos 6 and 14. Tatiana Monogarova, Sergei Leiferkus; London Philharmonic Orchestra. LPO–00805 (2014).
- Zemlinsky – A Florentine Tragedy, Six Maeterlinck Songs. Heike Wessels (Bianca), Sergey Skorokhodov (Guido Bardi), Albert Dohmen (Simone); Petra Lang (Maeterlinck Songs); London Philharmonic Orchestra. LPO–0078 (2014).
- Batagov – I FEAR NO MORE. Anton Batagov (Piano), Alexander Korenkov (Vocals), Asya Sorshneva (Violin), Sergei Kalachev (Bass guitar), Vladimir Zharko (Drums), State Academic Symphony Orchestra of the Russian Federation. FANCYMUSIC FANCY062
- Schnittke – Symphony No 3. Rundfunk-Sinfonieorchester Berlin. PENTATONE PTC 5186485 (2015).
- Julian Anderson – In lieblicher Bläue, Alleluia, The Stations of the Sun. Carolin Widmann (violin), London Philharmonic Choir, London Philharmonic Orchestra. LPO–0085 (2016).
- Rachmaninov – Symphony No. 3, 10 Songs (arr. V.M. Jurowski). Vsevolod Grivnov (tenor), London Philharmonic Orchestra. LPO–0088 (2016).
- Stravinsky – Petrushka (1911 version), Symphonies of Wind Instruments (original 1920 version), Orpheus. London Philharmonic Orchestra. LPO–0091 (2016).
- Richard Strauss – Also sprach Zarathustra / Gustav Mahler – Totenfeier. Rundfunk-Sinfonieorchester Berlin. PENTATONE PTC 5186597 (2017).
- Britten and Hindemith – Violin Concertos. Arabella Steinbacher, Berlin Radio Symphony Orchestra. PENTATONE PTC 5186625 (2017).
- Prokofiev – Symphonies Nos. 2 and 3. State Academic Symphony Orchestra of Russia ''Evgeny Svetlanov”. PENTATONE PTC 5186624 (2017).
- Tchaikovsky – The Sleeping Beauty. Vladimir Jurowski, State Academic Symphony Orchestra of Russia. ICA Classics (2013, released 2017).
- Tchaikovsky – Swan Lake. Vladimir Jurowski, State Academic Symphony Orchestra of Russia. PENTATONE PTC 5186640 (2018).
- Tchaikovsky – The Nutcracker. Vladimir Jurowski, State Academic Symphony Orchestra of Russia ''Evgeny Svetlanov”. PENTATONE PTC 5186761 (2019)
- Mahler – Das Lied von der Erde. Vladimir Jurowski, Sarah Connolly, Robert Dean Smith, Rundfunk-Sinfonieorchester Berlin. PENTATONE PTC 5186760.
- Beethoven – Symphonies No. 4 and 7, Coriolan Overture, Orchestra of the Age of Enlightenment, IdealeAudience DVD 3079298 (2010).

Cultural offices
Preceded by Andrew Davis	Music Director, Glyndebourne Opera; 2001–2013	Succeeded by Robin Ticciati
Preceded by Mark Gorenstein	Principal Conductor, State Academic Symphony Orchestra of the Russian Federation; 2011–2021	Succeeded by Vasily Petrenko
Preceded by Kirill Petrenko	Generalmusikdirektor, Bavarian State Opera; 2021–present	Succeeded by incumbent
