= Salomon Hermann Mosenthal =

Writer and dramatist known for opera libretti

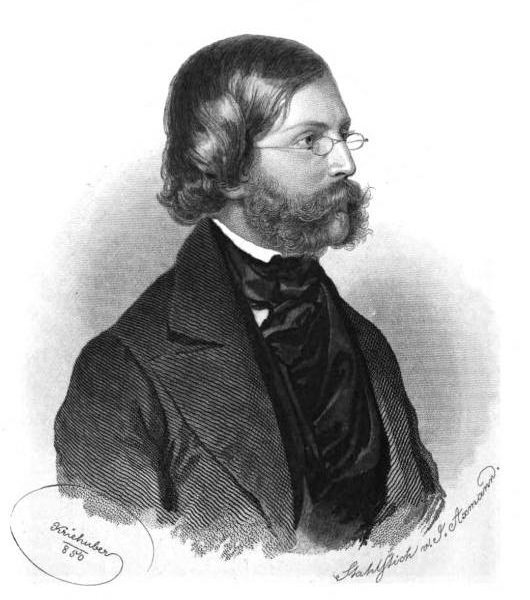
Salomon Hermann Mosenthal (1850)

Salomon Hermann Mosenthal (14 January 1821 in Kassel – 17 February 1877 in Vienna) was a writer, dramatist, and poet of German-Jewish descent who spent much of his life in Austria. He was also known for his opera libretti. His name is also sometimes written as Hermann Salomon von Mosenthal, Solomon Hermann Mosenthal, or Solomon Hermann von Mosenthal.

== Life ==
Mosenthal attended the gymnasium in Kassel and the polytechnic school in Karlsruhe. In 1841 he went to Vienna as a private teacher. In 1846 his dramatized folk-story Der Hollander Michel was produced as in 1847 was succeeded his three-act drama Die Sklavin. Neither of these had any enduring success.

In 1849 his poetic drama Cäcilia von Albano was warmly received by both the public and critics; after this he had opportunities at the Burgtheater, and Cäcilia was published in Budapest in 1851. His next production, Deborah (Budapest, 1849; Presburg, 1875, 6th ed. 1890), was translated into several languages. In English it became famous under the title of Leah, the Forsaken. It was first produced at the royal theater in Berlin in 1850.

Mosenthal also wrote opera librettos:

- Die lustigen Weiber von Windsor (Otto Nicolai, Vienna, 1871)
- Die Folkunger (Edmund Kretschmer, Dresden, 1874)
- Das goldene Kreuz (Ignaz Brüll, Berlin, 1875)
- Die Königin von Saba (Carl Goldmark, Vienna, 1888)
- Die Kinder der Heide, (Anton Rubinstein)
- Die Maccabäer, (Anton Rubinstein)
- Moses (Rubinstein)

A volume of Mosenthal's poems was published at Vienna in 1847, and a complete edition in 1866. He also wrote a novel, Jephtha's Tochter, which was included in the Neuer Deutscher Novellenschatz, No. 2, Munich, 1884. A collected edition of his writings, for the arrangement of which he had left instructions, was published in six volumes in Stuttgart in 1878; with a portrait.
