= State Academic Symphony Orchestra of the Russian Federation =

Russian symphonic orchestra based in Moscow

The State Academic Symphony Orchestra "Evgeny Svetlanov" (Государственный академический симфонический оркестр России имени Е. Ф. Светланова) is a Russian orchestra based in Moscow. Sometimes known in English as the Russian State Symphony Orchestra, the orchestra gives concerts in Moscow at the Great Hall of the Moscow Conservatory and at the Tchaikovsky Concert Hall.

== History ==
The orchestra was founded in 1936 as the USSR State Symphony Orchestra, with Alexander Gauk as its first music director. The orchestra changed its name after the dissolution of the Soviet Union. The orchestra's longest serving music director was Evgeny Svetlanov, from 1965 to 2000. Svetlanov's tenure ended with his controversial dismissal by Russia's minister of culture, Mikhail Shvydkoi, who had accused Svetlanov of spending excessive time conducting outside of Russia. In 2005, the orchestra officially acquired the additional name of Svetlanov Symphony Orchestra. The orchestra now has the formal name, in English, of the 'State Academic Symphony Orchestra "Evgeny Svetlanov"'.

Mark Gorenstein succeeded Svetlanov as music director from 2002 to 2011. In 2011, Gorenstein caused controversy with his remarks about Armenian cellist Narek Hakhnazaryan during the 2011 International Tchaikovsky Competition, which led to his removal as conductor for the competition. The orchestra then demanded Gorenstein's dismissal from the orchestra, with accusations of abusive behaviour. Gorenstein was subsequently dismissed from the orchestra in September 2011.

In October 2011, the orchestra announced the appointment of Vladimir Jurowski as its principal conductor, with immediate effect, for an initial contract of 3 years. Jurowski concluded his principal conductorship of the orchestra in 2021.

Vasily Petrenko became principal guest conductor of the orchestra in 2016. In January 2021, the orchestra announced the appointment of Petrenko as its next principal conductor, effective 1 September 2021. On 1 March 2022, Petrenko announced a suspension of his work with the orchestra, in the wake of the 2022 Russian invasion of Ukraine. Later in 2022, under duress from the Russian Ministry of Culture, Petrenko submitted a letter of resignation from the orchestra.

== Music Directors/Principal Conductors ==
- Alexander Gauk (1936–1941)
- Natan Rakhlin (1941–1945)
- Konstantin Ivanov (1946–1965)
- Evgeny Svetlanov (1965–2000)
- Vassily Sinaisky (2000–2002)
- Mark Gorenstein (2002–2011)
- Vladimir Jurowski (2011–2021)
- Vasily Petrenko (2021–2022)
