= Jurovský =

Jurovský, feminine: Jurovská is a Slovak surname equivalent to the Polish Jurowski. Notable people with the surnames include:

- Anton Jurovský (1940–2022), Slovak psychologist
- Marcela Plítková-Jurovská(1908–1985), Slovak filmmaker
- Šimon Jurovský (1912–1963), Slovak composer
