= Die Maccabäer =

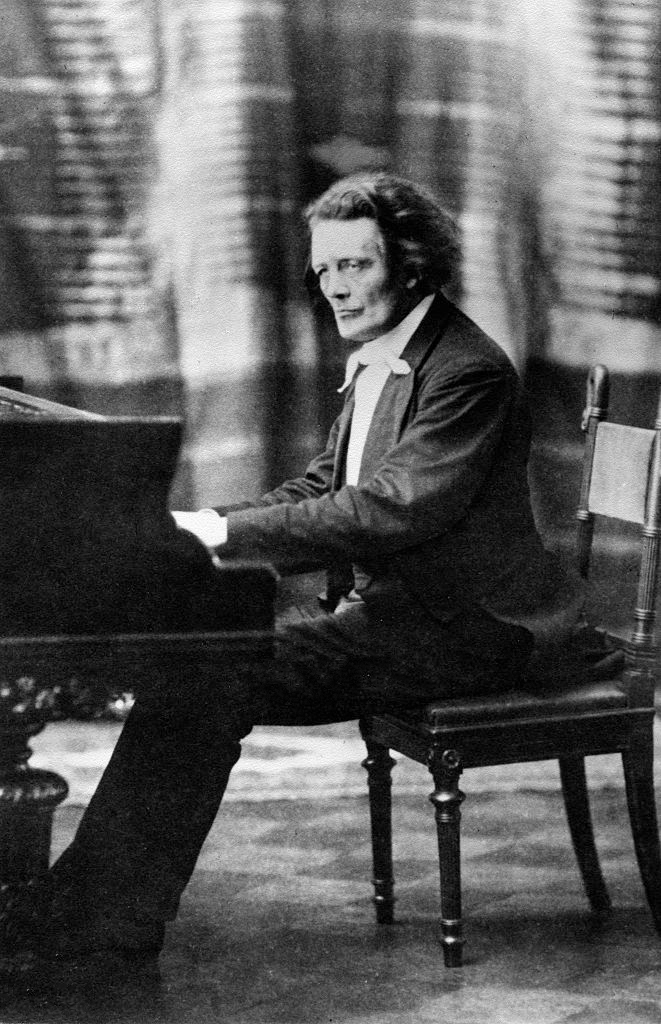
Rubinstein at the piano

Die Maccabäer (German, The Maccabees) (sometimes spelt 'Die Makkabäer') is an opera in three acts by Anton Rubinstein to a libretto by Salomon Hermann Mosenthal. The opera is based on a play by Otto Ludwig, which is itself based loosely on the biblical story of the Maccabees. Written in 1872–74, it was first performed on 17 April 1875 at the Hofoper, Berlin. Censorship problems prevented its performance in Russia until January 1877 (in St.Petersburg).

== Background ==
Die Maccabäer was Rubinstein's most successful opera, holding the German and Russian stages throughout his lifetime. The Berlin reviews of its premiere compared its success to that of Meyerbeer's L'Africaine, and after its Vienna premiere in 1878, the critic Eduard Hanslick believed it showed an alternative model for operatic development to the works of Richard Wagner. Rarely performed since the 19th century, there was a production in Hebrew in Jerusalem in 1925.

The rumour that the opera was to be premiered in Russia in the 1876/7 season aggravated the breach between the composer and Peter Tchaikovsky, who feared that it would displace his own opera Vakula the Smith (which however was performed there in December 1876). Tchaikovsky wrote to his brother Modest Tchaikovsky:

[..]Tell Anton Rubinstein "My brother has instructed me to tell you that you are a son of a bitch, and you can go and stuff your mother". No one has wounded my self-esteem as much as this Peterhof resident. And now he comes creeping with his mangy operas[..] If it weren't for the penal code, I would go to Peterhof and happily burn his wretched villa to the ground[...]

.

== Roles ==
Role	Voice type	Premiere Cast, 17 April 1875 (Conductor: )
Antiochus, king of Syria	bass	
Cleopatra, his daughter	soprano	
Gorgias a military captain	baritone	
Lea, mother of the Maccabees	contralto	
Juda a Maccabee	baritone	
Eleazar a Maccabee	tenor	
Joarim a Maccabee	mezzo-soprano	
Benjamin a Maccabee	soprano	
Noemi wife of Juda	soprano	
Boas Noemi's father	bass	
Joachim, a priest	bass	
Chorus: courtiers, Syrian and Hebrew soldiers, priests etc.

== Synopsis ==
Judaea: Modin and Jerusalem, 160 BC. The Jews resist the army of Syria under the leadership of the Maccabees, but Eleazar betrays the insurrection after falling in love with the Syrian king's daughter, Cleopatra. Juda is defeated and flees. After pleas from Lea, Antiochus agrees to spare the two younger brothers only if they renounce their religion - otherwise they will be burnt alive. Eleazar repents and joins them for their execution. At this point Juda, who has reignited the revolt, invades the palace. Antiochus is killed, but Lea also dies after witnessing her son's victory.

== Sources ==
- Richard Taruskin.Maccabäer, Die in Oxford Music Online, accessed 17 April 2010
- Philip S.Taylor, Anton Rubinstein, A Life in Music, Indianapolis, 2007
