= Michail Jurowski =

Russian conductor (1945–2022)

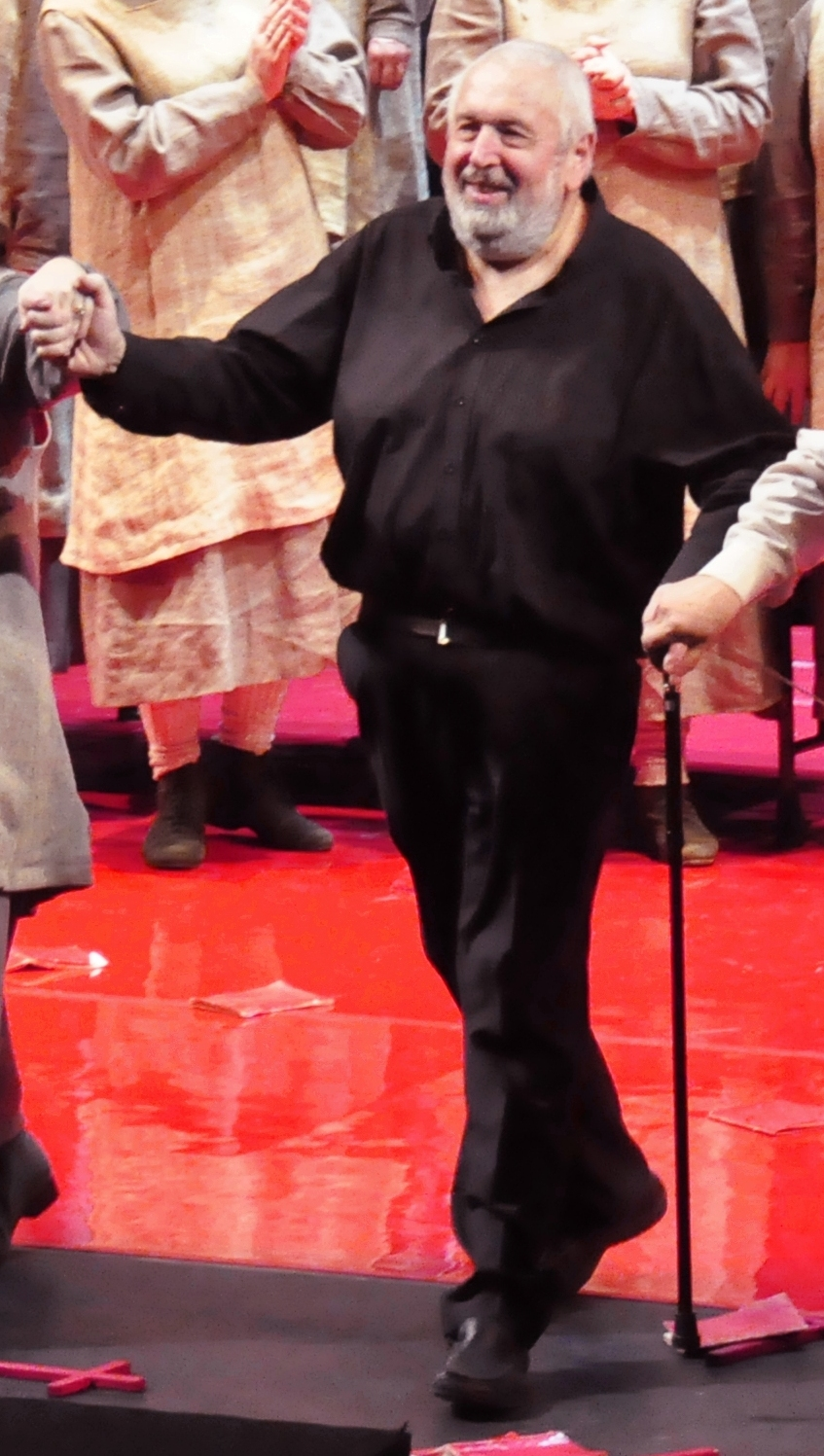
- Jurowski in 2014 after conducting Prokofiev's The Fiery Angel
- Born: Michail Vladimirovich Jurowski; 25 December 1945; Moscow, Russian SFSR, Soviet Union
- Died: 19 March 2022 (aged 76); Berlin, Germany
- Occupation: Conductor
- Organizations: Nordwestdeutsche Philharmonie; Norddeutsche Philharmonie Rostock; Berlin Radio Symphony Orchestra; WDR Rundfunkorchester Köln
- Spouse: Eleonora Dmitrievna Taratuta
- Children: 3, including Vladimir and Dmitri
- Father: Vladimir Mikhailovich Yurovsky
- Awards: International Shostakovich Prize

Michail Vladimirovich Jurowski (Russian: Михаил Владимирович Юровский, romanized: Mikhail Vladimirovich Yurovskiy; 25 December 1945 – 19 March 2022) was a Russian conductor who worked internationally, based in Germany for most of his career. He was particularly interested in the works of Dmitri Shostakovich, in concerts and recordings.

Jurowski grew up in a musical family, where his father Vladimir Mikhailovich Yurovsky was a composer, and many prominent Russian musicians were family friends. He first worked in Moscow, but was from 1978 a regular guest conductor at the Komische Oper Berlin, then in East Berlin. With a 1989 contract for the Staatsoper Dresden, he moved to Germany with his family. He was music director of the Nordwestdeutsche Philharmonie from 1992, and the Norddeutsche Philharmonie Rostock from 1999, followed by positions with the Berlin Radio Symphony Orchestra and the WDR Rundfunkorchester Köln. He worked as a guest worldwide, including Scandinavia and Argentina.

His recordings include the first recordings of Dmitri Shostakovich's unfinished opera The Gamblers after Nikolai Gogol, completed by Krzysztof Meyer in 1981, and of Anton Rubinstein's Moses. He was instrumental in founding the International Shostakovich Days in Gohrisch. His sons Vladimir and Dmitri are also conductors.

== Life and career ==
=== Moscow ===
Jurowski was born in Moscow, the son of composer Vladimir Michailovich Jurowski. Shostakovitch was a friend of the family, and as a boy, he played four-hand piano music with him. Other friends of the Jewish family were Aram Khachaturian, Mikhail Romm, David Oistrach, Mstislav Rostropovich, Emil Gilels and Leonid Kogan. Jurowski studied at the Moscow Conservatory with Leo Ginzburg and Alexey Kandinsky. He felt antisemitic tendencies already when studying. He later worked at the Stanislavski Theatre and the Bolshoi Theatre in Moscow. Jurowski was assistant to Gennady Rozhdestvensky at the Moscow Radio Symphony Orchestra. His positions were not adequate to his talent, due to the antisemitism of the time.

=== East Germany ===
From 1978, he was a regular guest conductor at the Komische Oper Berlin, then in East Berlin, and from 1988 also at the Staatsoper Dresden. He received increasing commissions from European countries. In 1989, he was offered a permanent position in Dresden, and moved to Germany in 1990. From 1992 to 1998, Jurowski was music director and principal conductor of the Nordwestdeutsche Philharmonie based in Herford. He conducted in 1995 the premiere recording of Dmitri Shostakovich's unfinished opera The Gamblers after Nikolai Gogol, completed by Krzysztof Meyer in 1981, sung in Russian by soloists of the Bolshoi Theatre, with the Nordwestdeutsche Philharmonie. From 1997, he served as Intendant of the Volkstheater Rostock as well as the Norddeutsche Philharmonie Rostock. In the 1990s, he worked in Berlin, where he settled, at all three opera houses, with the Deutsches Symphonie-Orchester Berlin and Rundfunk-Sinfonieorchester Berlin, as regular conductor from 1998 to 2006. He was first guest conductor for the Tonkünstler Orchestra in Lower Austria.

=== International ===
Jurowski was active in Europe, including Moscow again and La Scala in Milan, and beyond, such as with the Buenos Aires Philharmonic in the Teatro Colón. In Scandinavia, he was close with the Norrköping Symphony Orchestra, and conducted the Bergen Philharmonic, and in Malmö, Odense and Copenhagen. He conducted at the Oper Frankfurt, at the Paris Opéra, and the London Philharmonic Orchestra and Saint Petersburg Philharmonic Orchestra, among other. From 1999 to 2001, he was principal conductor of the Leipzig Opera, and from 2006 to 2008 principal director of the WDR Rundfunkorchester Köln. He conducted Prokofiev's The Fiery Angel at the Bavarian State Opera in 2017. He conducted the first performance and recording of Anton Rubinstein's opera Moses with the Polish Sinfonia Iuventus Orchestra in Warsaw in 2017. Jurowski was instrumental in founding the International Shostakovich Days in Gohrisch in 2010.

== Personal life ==
Jurowski and his wife Eleonora Dmitrievna Taratuta had three children, Vladimir, a conductor, Generalmusikdirektor of the Bavarian State Opera, Maria, a pianist and music teacher, and Dmitri, also a conductor. In 2015, Jurowski published an autobiography, covering as a gifted storyteller his meetings with great musicians.

Jurowski died of organ failure at a Berlin hospital on 19 March 2022, aged 76.

== Recordings ==
Jurowski made several first recordings, some in series such as orchestral works by Berthold Goldschmidt, and symphonies by Ture Rangström and Wilhelm Peterson-Berger. He recorded rarely performed music such as Franz Lehár's opera Tatjana, Serge Prokofiev ballet Auf dem Dnjepr, Giacomo Meyerbeer's incidental music to Struensee, and works by Aram Khachaturian, Ottorino Respighi and Franz von Suppé. He conducted Shostakvich's film scores, orchestral songs, and his cantata Stenka Rasin.

- Svendsen, J : Symphonic Introduction to Bjornson's Sigurd Slembe, Naxos Digital Services Ltd., 2009, OCLC 704991366
- Michail Jurowski in Gohrisch : Internationale Schostakowitsch Tage Gohrisch, Hamburg Edel Germany GmbH, 2017, OCLC 1187975840
- Shostakovich: King Lear (Film Music and Incidental Music) (Berlin Radio Symphony, Michail Jurowski), Naxos Digital Services US Inc., OCLC 884883777
- Shostakovich, Meyer: Die Spieler = The Gamblers, Capriccio, 2009, OCLC 704924089
- Shostakovich: Goldene Berge = Golden Mountains; Trilogie zu Maxim = Trilogy about Maxim, Capriccio, 2009, OCLC 704920493
- Respighi: Marie Victoire [Opera] (Kizart, Bruck, Villar, Pauly, Bronk, Schumann, Deutsche Oper Berlin, Michail Jurowski), Naxos Digital Services US Inc., 2012, OCLC 885060875
- Wilhelm Peterson-Berger: Symphony No. 3 "Same ätnam"; Earina suite; Choral and fugue, cpo, 2000, OCLC 1057122860
- Rimsky-Korsakov: Orchesterwerke = Orchestra Works, Capriccio, 2009, OCLC 704921784
- Prokofiev: Chout : Complete Ballet, Op. 21, cpo, 2003, OCLC 1062363750
- Prokofiev: On the Dnieper, Op. 51, cpo, 2003, OCLC 873091528
- Rimsky-Korsakov: Opernsuiten = Opera Suites, Capriccio, 2009, OCLC 704921643
- Prokofiev: Cinderella, Op. 87, cpo, 2000, OCLC 1057122847
- Norwegian Heartland : The Romantic Orchestral Heritage (in Norwegian), Simax Classics, 2005, OCLC 811337092
- Otto Nicolai: Die lustigen Weiber von Windsor = The Merry Wives of Windsor; Der Tempelritter = The Templar; Die Heimkehr des Verbannten = The Return of the Exiled; Fantasie et Variations brillantes über ein Thema aus "Norma" = Fantasy and brillant variations on a theme of "Norma"; Trauermarsch = Funeral march; Kirchliche Festouvertüre = Church festival overture, Naxos Digital Services/Capriccio, 2009, OCLC 704920662
- Shostakovich: Die Hinrichtung des Stepan Rasin, Op. 119; Zwei Fabeln nach Krylow, Op. 4; Zwischenaktmusiken aus der Oper Katharina Ismailowa, Naxos Digital Services/Capriccio, 2009, OCLC 704921651
- Prokofiev: Eugen Onegin; Pique Dame, Naxos Digital Services/Capriccio, 2009, OCLC 704925051
- Prokofiev: Ballets I, cpo, 2003, OCLC 1062363511
- Hamlet; Boris Godunov, Naxos Digital Services/Capriccio, 2009, OCLC 704924835
- Kancheli: Symphonies 2 & 7, cpo, 1995, OCLC 1062350717
- Berthold Goldschmidt: Overture "The comedy of Errors" Greek Suite (in German), cpo, 1995, OCLC 886826832
- Khachaturian: Spartacus [Ballet] (Jurowski), Naxos Digital Services US Inc., OCLC 884198237
- Lehár: Tatjana (in German), cpo, 2002, OCLC 50879998
- Lehár: Overtures & waltzes, cpo, 2003, OCLC 873062231
- Meyerbeer: Orchestral Music (Music for Festive Occasions) (Hannover Radio Philharmonic, Jurowski), Naxos Digital Services US Inc., OCLC 885062942
- Meyerbeer: Struensee, Naxos Digital Services US Inc., OCLC 885064865
- Ture Rangström: Symphonies Nos. 3 and 4 (Norrköping Symphony, Jurowski), Naxos Digital Services US Inc., OCLC 885067325
- Ture Rangström: Complete symphonies, cpo, 2000, OCLC 48382996
- Suppé: Pique dame operetta in one act (in German), CPO, 2009, OCLC 730297223

== Writings ==
- Jurowski, Michail (2015). Michail Jurowski : Dirigent und Kosmopolit : Erinnerungen (in German). Leipzig: Hensche. ISBN 978-3-89487-781-1. OCLC 930078894.

== Awards ==
- 1992, 1996, 2017 Preis der deutschen Schallplattenkritik
- 2001 Grammy nominations for three CD productions of Orchestral Music by Rimsky-Korsakov with the Rundfunk-Sinfonieorchester Berlin
- 2012 International Shostakovich Prize by the Shostakovich Gohrisch Foundation

Cultural offices
Preceded by Helmuth Froschauer	Chief Conductor, Kölner Rundfunkorchester; 2006–2008	Succeeded by Niklas Willén
