= Vladimir Yurovsky =

Ukrainian Soviet composer (1915–1972)

Yurovsky in August 1971

Vladimir Mikhailovich Yurovsky (Russian: Владимир Михайлович Юровский; Tarashcha, 7 [20] March 1915 – 26 January 1972, in Moscow) was a Ukrainian Soviet film music composer. His son was the conductor Michail Jurowski, his grandsons are Vladimir Jurowski (born 4 April 1972) (also named Vladimir Michailovich Jurowski) and Dmitri Jurowski (born 1979), both conductors. He married the daughter of David S. Block (1888-1948), conductor, organizer, the first director of the National Orchestra of Cinematography of the USSR, and a member of the Jewish Anti-Fascist Committee.

== Works ==
- Opera Duma over Opanasa ("Дума про Опанаса") 1940 after Eduard Bagritskiy 1926
