= Karl von Perfall =

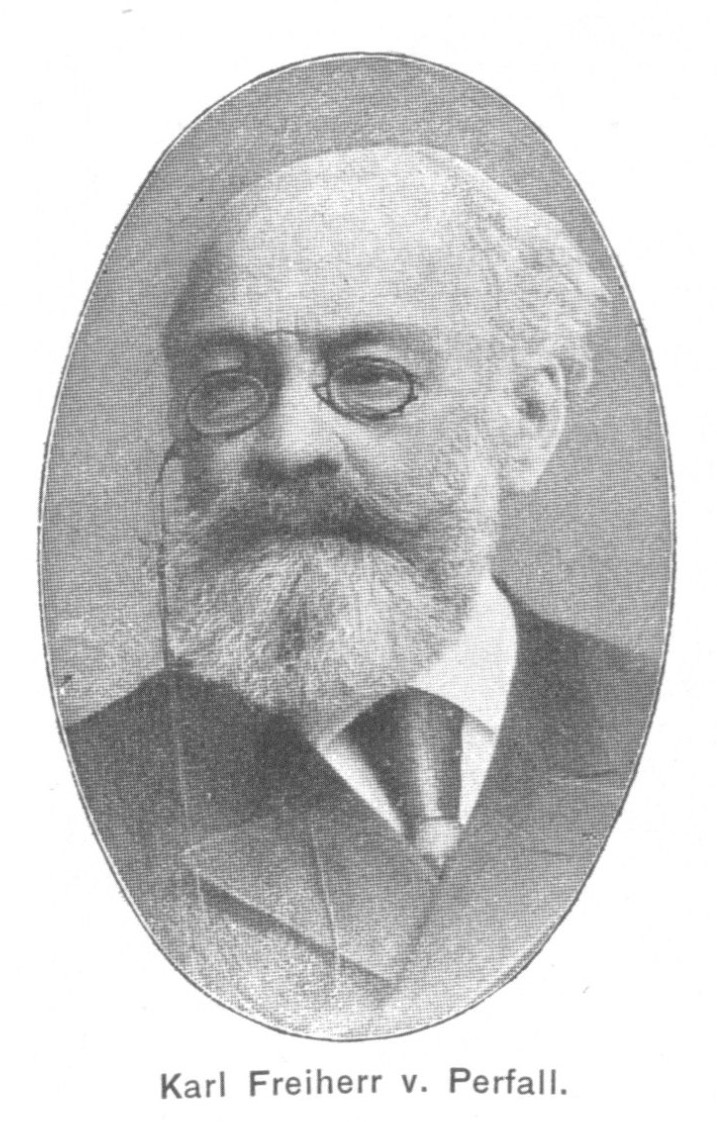
- 1901 portrait of Karl von Perfall
- Born: January 29, 1824; Munich, Germany
- Died: January 14, 1907 (aged 82)
- Occupation: Composer

Karl, Frieherr von Perfall (January 29, 1824 – January 14, 1907) was a German composer and conductor. A native of Munich, he studied in Leipzig, but spent the bulk of his career in the city of his birth, in which he died. Among his operas is Junker Heinz, to a libretto by Franz Grandour; his Raimondin, later revised as Melusine, was also successful. During his career he directed a variety of musical organizations in Munich.
