= Oskar Walleck =

Czech actor and director

Oskar Walleck (1890-) was a Czech actor and director from Brno.

The actor and director joined the NSDAP and the SS in 1932.

In 1934/35, he came to Munich, where he was appointed Generalintendant of the Bayerisches Staatstheater. As such, he also controlled all other Bavarian theaters.

In 1939, Walleck became Generalintendant in Prague.

To stage Rüdiger von Bechelaren, a play by Hans Baumann, Walleck traveled to Passau in 1940.
