= Bavarian Ministry of Science, Research and Art =

Bayerisches Staatsministerium für Wissenschaft und Kunst
- Abbreviation: StMWK
- Founded: 27 February 1847 (als Staatsministerium des Innern für Kirchen- und Schulangelegenheiten), 2018 in seiner jetzigen Bezeichnung
- Headquarters: München
- Members: 240 (2021)
- Staatsminister: Markus Blume
- Budget: 8,265 Mrd. EUR (2021)
- Website: www.stmwk.bayern.de

The Bavarian State Ministry for Science and the Arts (German: das Bayerische Staatsministerium für Wissenschaft und Kunst) is a ministry of the Free State of Bavaria with responsibility for science and the arts. It was officially created in March 2018, however it previously existed as the State Ministry for Science, Research and the Arts (German: das Staatsministerium für Wissenschaft, Forschung und Kunst) from 1986 to 1990 and from October 1998 to October 2013.

The current state minister is Markus Blume.
