= Dmitri Jurowski =

German conductor

Dmitri Mikhailovich Jurowski (Russian: Дми́трий Миха́йлович Юро́вский; born 6 November 1979) is a German conductor and the grandson of composer Vladimir Michailovich Jurowski.

== Early life and education ==
Jurowski was born in Moscow, into a Jewish family with several generations of musicians. At the age of six he began learning cello at the Moscow Conservatory and then moved with his family to Berlin, where he attended the Musikgymnasium Carl Philipp Emanuel Bach. He continued his cello studies at the Rostock University of Music and Theatre, and in April 2003 began attending conducting lessons at the Academy of Music Hanns Eisler Berlin. Soon afterwards, he became an assistant conductor for a production of Prokofiev's Boris Godunov which he conducted along with his father, Mikhail Jurowski, for the Berlin Radio Symphony Orchestra.

== Career ==
=== Assistant conductor ===
In September 2004, he was assistant conductor of Parsifal at the Genoan Teatro Carlo Felice under the guidance of Harry Kupfer and then conducted Prokofiev's The Love for Three Oranges with Associazione Lirica e Concertistica Italiana. The opera toured 23 theatres in Northern Italy; as a result of its success since after it he was invited to the Martina Franca Festival. In 2005 he performed and recorded, for the Dynamic label, Luigi Cherubini's Lo Sposo di tre e il Marito di Nessuna and Cherubini's Requiem. Later, with the Munich Radio Orchestra, he conducted Rimsky-Korsakov's operas Mozart and Salieri and The Golden Cockerel followed by Prokofiev's Peter and the Wolf and another production of Love for Three Oranges.

=== Conductor ===
As a conductor, Jurowski conducted both the Residentie Orchestra of The Hague, Sofia Philharmonic and the Orchestra Sinfonica del Lazio. He also played a gala concert in Parma and was a guest conductor at the Teatro Comunale di Bologna, where he performed Ludwig van Beethoven's Symphony No. 2 and Symphony No. 7. He subsequently conducted at La Fenice, Turin's Teatro Regio and Teatro Filarmonico. He also made a trip to China, where he conducted the Shanghai Philharmonic Orchestra.

In 2007 to 2008 he conducted Prokofiev's Betrothal in a Monastery at the Palau de les Arts Reina Sofia and made various appearances with Filarmonica Toscanini in Parma as well as giving a New Year's Day's performance in New York City. He participated at the Al Bustan Festival in Beirut, where he conducted Tchaikovsky's Piano Concerto No. 1 and Brahms' German Requiem.

In June 2007 he conducted Antonín Dvořák's Rusalka at the Wexford Opera Festival in Ireland and in fall 2008 was invited to perform Rimsky-Korsakov's The Snow Maiden. During the same year he also performed both Tchaikovsky's Eugene Onegin and Strauss's Die Fledermaus, with the Dresden Philharmonic and the Liege Opera of Belgium. He appeared with Lisbon's Orquestra Sinfonica Portuguesa, the New Israeli Opera and even the Mikhaylovsky Theatre of Saint Petersburg.

In 2009 he appeared at the Vlaamse Opera, where he conducted Tchaikovsky's opera, Mazeppa and conducted another Tchaikovsky opera, Queen of Spades at Opéra de Monte-Carlo. The same year he conducted Andrea Chénier at the Deutsche Oper Berlin and Lady Macbeth of the Mtsensk District at the Municipal Theatre of Santiago in Chile.

On 11 August 2010 he conducted a production of Eugene Onegin at the Royal Opera House. On 1 January 2011 he became a chief conductor of the Vlaamse Opera and will hold this post until 2016.

=== Career at the Novosibirsk Opera and Ballet Theatre ===
From 2015 to 2021 he was the musical director and principal conductor of the Novosibirsk Opera and Ballet Theatre, and since 2021 he has been the artistic director and principal conductor of this theatre.
