= Brauss =

Brauss or Brauß is a German surname. Notable people with the name include:

- Arthur Brauss (1936–2025), German actor
- Elisabeth Brauß (born 1995), German pianist, daughter of Martin
- Martin Brauß (born 1958), German pianist

== See also ==
- "BRAUSS" for Dr. B. R. Ambedkar University of Social Sciences), university in Madhya Pradesh, India
