= Yi Fan-Chiang =

Yi Fan-Chiang (范姜毅, pinyin: Fàn jiāng yì, born 1981 in Taiwan) is a Taiwanese classical pianist and piano professor.

From the age of three until eleven, Yi Fan-Chiang learned to play the piano at Yamaha Music School Taiwan, and in his final four years there also became interested in playing the clarinet and composing. During his childhood in Taiwan he earned numerous awards in those disciplines. In 1994 he emigrated to Germany where he attended secondary school in Emmendingen before studying piano with teachers such as Michael Uhde, Boris Lvov and Victor Merzhanov at the music academies Staatliche Hochschule für Musik Trossingen and Hochschule für Musik Karlsruhe. In 1998 he went on to study at Hochschule für Musik und Theater Hannover, first with Martin Dörrie and then Matti Raekallio.

Yi Fan-Chiang then became a piano instructor himself, teaching at the master and doctoral levels at Trossingen, substituting for Tomislav Baynov for three years. Since 2012 he is a professor at the Taipei National University of the Arts, and in 2016 he became the head of the piano department there. For two consecutive years, he has held the office of the councillor of the National Theater and Concert Hall, Taipei.

Yi Fan-Chiang won awards at more than 30 piano competitions, including the International Piano Competition of the Chopin-Gesellschaft Hannover, the Bruno-Frey-Musikpreis 2002, the Città di Minerbio International Piano Competition in 2003, the Premio Pianistico Internationale "Stefano Marizza" in 2007, the Ibiza International Piano Competition and the International Competition Città di Ovada, both in 2008. Later he often served as jury member at piano competitions himself, including the Ibiza International Piano Competition in 2010, the 37th Macao Young Musicians Competition in 2019 and the Elevato Piano Competition in 2022.

In 2021, Yi Fan-Chiang received a Golden Melody Award from Taiwan's Ministry of Culture in the "Best Instrumental Performance" category for his piano concerto album Four Seasons in Taoyuan.

Apart from the aforementioned teachers, Yi Fan-Chiang has studied under Paul Badura-Skoda, Peter Feuchtwanger, Pavel Gililov, Conrad Hansen, Klaus Hellwig, Yuri Rozum, Igor Zhukov, Einar Steen-Nøkleberg and Justus Zeyen, among others. He has collaborated with renowned musicians such as the German conductor and composer Klaus Arp, American violinist Joshua Bell and British-Hungarian conductor Gilbert Varga.
