= Vladimir Krainev =

Russian musician (1944–2011)

Vladimir Krainev (Russian: Влади́мир Все́володович Кра́йнев; 1 April 1944 – 29 April 2011) was a Russian pianist and professor of piano, People's Artist of the USSR.

== Biography ==
Krainev was born in Krasnoyarsk, the son of musician Vsevolod Krainev and pediatrician Rachil Gerschoig.

He studied at the Central School of the Moscow Conservatory in the class of Anaida Sumbatyan, and also studied at the Conservatory in the classes of Heinrich Neuhaus, and his son, Stanislav Neuhaus.

After winning second prize at the Leeds International Piano Competition and first prize at the Vianna da Motta International Music Competition (ex-aequo with Nelson Freire), and especially after his victory at the fourth International Tchaikovsky Competition in Moscow (first prize ex-aequo with John Lill), his career as a pianist began.

He performed with some of the world's leading orchestras and conductors, and collaborated with renowned artists throughout the world. Alfred Schnittke dedicated one of his piano concertos to him. International music festivals known as "The Invitation of Vladimir Krainev" were held each year in Ukraine, Kazakhstan, and Kyrgyzstan, and concerts called "Vladimir Krainev: his Friends and Pupils" were given annually at the Moscow Conservatory. Krainev was a jury member of many international piano competitions, for instance: Leeds, Lisbon, and Tokyo, as well as the Tchaikovsky Competition in Moscow.

Vladimir Krainev was a professor at the Hochschule für Musik und Theater in Hannover, Germany, where 29 young pianists from the People's Republic of China, France, Germany, Korea, Russia, Ukraine, and other countries studied with him. Among his students were Katia Skanavi, Vladimir Sverdlov, Igor Tchetuev, Aglika Genova and Liuben Dimitrov, Pascal Godart, Alexandre Moutouzkine, Irma Issakadze, Denys Proshayev, Hisako Kawamura, Dong-Min Lim, Ilya Rashkovsky, Mariya Kim, Ingmar Lazar, Gintaras Januševičius, Paul Kern, Lin Ye, Chun-Chieh Yen, Sun Ho Lee, and Sung Chang. In 1992, Krainev organized the first international competition of young pianists in Kharkiv, Ukraine.

He lived in Hannover, and was married to Tatiana Tarasova, a renowned figure skating coach, who trained the winners of nine Olympic gold medals.

On 29 April 2011 Krainev died in his house in Hannover, aged 67.
