= Kim Seong-hun =

- Hangul: 김성훈
- RR: Gim Seonghun
- MR: Kim Sŏnghun

Kim Seong-hun (Korean: 김성훈) is a Korean name consisting of the family name Kim and the given name Seong-hun, and may also refer to:

- Kim Sung-hoon (biologist) (born 1958), South Korean biologist
- Kim Seong-hun (filmmaker) (born 1971), South Korean filmmaker
- Kim Sung-hoon (director) (born 1974), South Korean film director
- Sung-hoon Kim (born 1978), South Korean pianist
- Kim Sung-hun (politician), a North Korean politician
- Kim Sung-hoon, birth name of the actor Ha Jung-woo
