= Deniola Kuraja =

Albanian conductor and pianist

Deniola Kuraja is an Albanian conductor, pianist and general music director at the National Opera and Ballet Theatre of Albania (Teatri Kombëtar i Operas dhe Baletit - TKOB) in Tirana.

== Life ==
Kuraja studied piano at the Jan Kukuzeli Music School in Durrës from 1983 to 1991 and with Anita Tartari at the University of Arts Tirana (Tirana) from 1994 to 1999. She also studied with Francesco Monopoli at the Conservatorio di Música N. Piccinni in Bari (Italy) and is a master student of Till Engel, Gerard Fremy, Anna Maria Stainczyk, Michele Campanella, and Manon-Liu Winter. From 2009 Kuraja studied conducting at the University of Music, Drama and Media Hannover with Eiji Oue and Martin Brauß. She is also a master student of Michael Dittrich.

She began her career as a piano accompanist for the violin and flute classes at the University of Arts Tirana. Kuraja has also been a répétiteur at the National Theatre of Opera and Ballet of Albania (Tirana), the Macedonian Opera and Ballet in Skopje (Macedonia), the Hanover State Opera, and a répétiteur for the opera and conducting classes at the University of Music, Drama and Media Hannover.

As a pianist, she appeared early on in concert with virtuoso works such as the Andante spianato et Grande Polonaise brillante in E-flat major Op. 22 by Frédéric Chopin, accompanied by the orchestra of the National Theatre of Opera and Ballet of Albania and the Symphony Orchestra of Albanian Radio Television. Her active repertoire includes works such as Sergei Rachmaninoff's Piano Concerto No. 3 in D minor (Op. 30) and the Variations on "La ci darem la mano," Op. 2 by Frédéric Chopin. Kuraja also appears as a vocal accompanist and in chamber music, here with the Albanian pianist Endri Nini, among others.

Kuraja is Artistic Director of the National Theatre of Opera and Ballet of Albania. She appears internationally, e.g. frequently in Germany with conductorships at the Hildesheim Municipal Theater and numerous opera conductorships at the Staatstheater Kassel.

== Awards and prizes ==
- 1994: First prize at the piano competition The Young Pianist in Tirana at the National Theatre of Opera and Ballet of Albania
- 1997: Award winner of the Cesk Zadeja and Toni Harapi Competition in Tirana
- 2006: Fellowship of the Istituto Italiano di Cultura for her studies the Conservatorio di Musica N. Piccinni in Bari
