= Watch What Happens =

Watch What Happens may refer to:

- "Watch What Happens", Norman Gimbel's English relyricization of Michel Legrand's song "Recit de Cassard" from 1964 film Umbrellas of Cherbourg
- Watch What Happens, a 1967 jazz album by Harold Vick
- Watch What Happens!, a 1968 jazz album by Steve Kuhn
- Watch What Happens (album), a 1968 live album by Chris Montez
- Watch What Happens, a 1978 jazz album by The L.A. Four
- The Jazz Album: Watch What Happens, a 2006 album by Thomas Quasthoff
- Watch What Happens Live with Andy Cohen, an American talk show
