= Seon-ho =

- Hangul: 선호
- RR: Seonho
- MR: Sŏnho

Seon-ho (Korean: 선호), also spelt Sun-ho, is a Korean given name. As of 2026, the name ranked 165th out of 36,179 male names and 2,097th out of 28,726 female names. A total of 3,517 people, consisting of 3,477 males and 40 females, were born with the name from 2008 to 2026.

Notable people with the name include:

- Kim Seon-ho, South Korean actor
- Yoo Seon-ho, South Korean actor, singer, and model
- Lee Seon-ho, South Korean actor
- Park Sun-ho, South Korean actor
- Park Seon-ho, South Korean track cyclist
- Sin Son-ho, North Korean diplomat
- Kim Seon-ho (general), South Korean politician and retired Republic of Korea Army lieutenant general
- Sun Ho Lee, South Korean pianist
- Lee Seon-ho, stage name Andy Lee, South Korean singer, rapper, actor and record producer
- Choi Sun-ho, South Korean judoka
- Hwang Sun-ho, former South Korean badminton player
- Baek Sun-ho, South Korean actor
- Song Sun-ho, South Korean former footballer

== See also ==
- List of Korean given names
