= Sung Chang =

- Born: Chang, Sung; 1986; Seoul, Korea
- Origin: Korea
- Genres: Classical Music
- Occupation: Concert pianist
- Website: sungchangpianist.com

Sung Chang (born 1986) is a South Korean concert pianist. He attracted international attention when he became the youngest ever to win the Nagoya International Piano Competition in Japan.

== Biography ==
Sung Chang was born in Seoul, Korea, Chang began music as a young child, inspired by his pianist mother. Sung Chang gave his debut concert at the age of five. At 16 he was accepted into the prestigious Korea National University of Arts, where he completed his undergraduate degree. Chang traveled to Hannover, Germany, to continue his studies under the tutelage of Vladimir Krainev and Ewa Kupiec, and completed the Master of Music “Künstlerische Ausbildung” and a postgraduate program “Soloklasse" at the Hochschule für Musik, Theater und Medien Hannover. After completing his studies in Germany, he came to the United States and finished further studies at the USC Thornton School of Music. On March 6, 2024, it was revealed that he was the popular YouTuber and piano content creator Traum Piano.

== Career ==
He has received critical acclaim for his “poetic imagination, superb technical skills, and, most importantly, a deep emotional connection to whatever music he plays” by Jeffrey Kahane. With over 20 concerti and many complete recital programs in his repertoire, Chang has been engaged as a soloist in Germany, Italy, The Netherlands, France, Czech Republic, Japan, Taiwan, China, Korea, and the United States. He has performed solo recitals at the Concertgebouw, Teatro Lirico di Cagliari, and Seoul Arts Center. Last season alone, Chang performed in more than fifteen major cities across the U.S., including Walt Disney Concert Hall in Los Angeles, where he performed Liszt's Concerto No.1. He also has appeared as a guest soloist with the Phoenix Symphony Orchestra, KBS Symphony Orchestra, Kyung-Ki Philharmonic Orchestra, HMTM Hannover Orchestra, Taejon Symphony Orchestra, Wonju Symphony Orchestra, and KNUA Symphony Orchestra. In March 2019 he performed the Grieg Piano Concerto with the Louisiana Philharmonic Orchestra under the baton of Maestro Carlos Prieto.

Chamber Music

As a founder of the LAE quartet (Los Angeles Ensembles quartet), he is an active chamber recitalist in the greater Los Angeles area. He garnered the first prize, audience prize, and the Schubert special prize in the International Schubert Competition for Piano Duo. In 2018, he and the violinist YuEun Kim received the 2nd prize at the Boulder International Chamber Music Competition: The Art of Duo. This duo performed the complete Beethoven Violin Sonatas, all within a span of three weeks, at the USC Thorton School of Music. He currently serves as a music director and conductor for the Beethoven Project Orchestra in Orange County, California. They performed Beethoven Piano Concertos No. 1 and 2, and the Triple Concerto in 2018.

== Awards ==
Chang has gone on to win more than ten international competitions around the world including in the United States, Germany, Italy, Korea, and Japan. His awards from the major international piano competitions includes- the first prize and the audience prize at the Chopin-Gesellschaft Hannover Internationaler Klavierwettbewerb, the first prize and the special award for the "Best Performance of a Virtuoso Piece" at the Bösendorfer USASU International Piano Competition, a silver medal with two special prizes in "Best Performance of a Work by a Classical Composer" and "Best Performance of a Work by a Spanish, Latin American or Impressionistic Composer" at the San Antonio International Piano Competition, and a silver medal at the New Orleans International Piano Competition.

== List of awards ==
| Year | Competition | Prize |
|---|---|---|
| 2018 | Boulder International Chamber Music Competition: Art of Duo | 2nd Prize Winner |
| 2018 | 27th New Orleans International Piano Competition | Silver Medal |
| 2016 | 12th San Antonio International Piano Competition | Silver MedalBest Performance of a Work by a Classical Composer Best Performance of a Work by Spanish, Latin American or Impressionistic Composer |
| 2015 | 7th Bösendorfer USASU International Piano Competition | 1st Prize WinnerVirtuoso Special Prize |
| 2011 | 17th International Schubert Competition for Piano Duo | 1st Prize Winner |
| 2011 | 13th International Chopin Competition (Hanover) | 1st Prize Winner Audience Prize |
| 2009 | 25th Valsesia Musica International Competition | 1st Prize Winner |
| 2006 | 17th KBS Music International Competition | 1st Prize Winner |
| 2005 | 30th JoongAng Music Competition | 1st Prize Winner - Piano |
| 2003 | 2nd Nagoya International Competition | 1st Prize Winner Chamber Music Award Japan EXPO Special Prize |
| 2002 | 34th Nanpa Competition | 1st Prize Winner |

== Discography ==
In November 2018, Sung released his first CD Aleph.
