= Kang Sung-hoon =

- Hangul: 강성훈
- RR: Gang Seonghun
- MR: Kang Sŏnghun

Kang Sung-hoon (Korean: 강성훈) is a Korean name consisting of the family name Kang and the given name Sung-hoon, and may also refer to:

- Kang Sung-hoon (singer) (born 1980), South Korean singer
- Kang Sung-hoon (golfer) (born 1987), South Korean golfer
