= Sung Hoon =

Sung Hoon or Sunghoon (Korean: 성훈) is an alternative romanization of Seong-hoon, a Korean given name.

It may also refer to:

- Sung Hoon (actor) (born 1983), South Korean actor
- Sung Hoon (singer, born 1980), South Korean singer, former member of R&B band Brown Eyed Soul
- Sunghoon (singer, born 2002), South Korean singer and former figure skater, member of boy band Enhypen
