= Zeyen =

Zeyen is a surname. Notable people with the surname include:

- Annika Zeyen (born 1985), German wheelchair basketball player
- Justus Zeyen (1963–2025), German classical pianist
