= Jonas Stark (pianist) =

German pianist (born 1998)

Jonas Stark (born 8 July 1998 in Saarlouis, Germany) is a German classical pianist. He has performed in numerous countries across Europe, as well as in Asia and Australia, and has appeared as a soloist with renowned orchestras.

== Biography ==
Jonas Stark began his musical training at the age of five with Jelena Semenenko. In 2018, he completed his Bachelor’s degree at the University of Music Saar under Professor Thomas Duis. He then pursued a Master’s degree and the Professional Diploma with Professor Ian Fountain at the Royal Academy of Music in London. In 2025 he completed his Konzertexamen with Professor Roland Krüger at the Hanover University of Music, Drama and Media, where he is also holding a teaching position for piano since 2023.

Stark has participated in masterclasses with renowned pianists and musicians, including Dmitri Alexeev, Dmitri Bashkirov, Adrian Brendel, Imogen Cooper, Pascal Devoyon, Konrad Elser, Christopher Elton, Janina Fialkowska, Peter Frankl, Bernd Goetzke, Grigory Gruzman, Martin Helmchen, Leslie Howard, Paul Lewis, Geoffrey Madge, Anna Malikova, Robert McDonald, Midori, Kent Nagano, Steven Osborne, John Perry, Arie Vardi, and Jörg Widmann.

== Career ==
Jonas Stark has appeared as a soloist with numerous renowned orchestras, including the Beethoven Orchestra Bonn, the Deutsche Radio Philharmonie, the Duisburg Philharmonic, the Haydn Philharmonic, the Heidelberg Philharmonic Orchestra, the Munich Chamber Orchestra, the Norddeutsche Philharmonie, and the Vienna Symphony.

He has collaborated with distinguished conductors such as Marin Alsop, Marcus Bosch, Martin Fratz, Dietger Holm, Axel Kober, Oksana Lyniv, Petr Popelka, and Kahchun Wong. His performances have taken him to Germany, France, the Netherlands, the United Kingdom, Ireland, Poland, Slovakia, Austria, Switzerland, Italy, Russia, China, the Philippines, and Australia.

Recordings of his live performances and studio sessions have been broadcast by various national and international radio stations, including ABC Classic, BR-Klassik, BBC Radio 3, Deutschlandfunk (DLF Kultur), Hessischer Rundfunk (HR 2), Mitteldeutscher Rundfunk (MDR Kultur), Norddeutscher Rundfunk (NDR Kultur), Österreichischer Rundfunk (Ö1), Radio Canada, Saarländischer Rundfunk (SR Kultur), Swiss Radio (SRF Kultur), Südwestrundfunk (SWR Kultur), and WDR 3.

== Awards and honours ==
Jonas Stark has received numerous prizes at national and international competitions, including:

- 3rd Prize and Special Prize for the best Interpretation of a 21st century work at the International Telekom Beethoven Competition Bonn (2025)
- 2nd Prize (ex aequo) at the International Beethoven Competition Vienna (2025)
- Special Prize at the Deutscher Musikwettbewerb in Leipzig (2025)
- 1st Prize at the 6th Hong Kong International Piano Competition (2022)
- Special Prize at the 71st ARD International Music Competition in Munich (2022)
- 3rd Prize at the 14th International Schubert Competition in Dortmund (2021)
- 1st Prize at the 19th Walter Gieseking Competition in Saarbrücken (2017)
- 1st Prize at the International Piano Competition FLAME in Paris (2017)
- 1st Prize and two Special Prizes at the 51st national “Jugend musiziert” competition in Braunschweig/Wolfenbüttel (2014)
- Encouragement Award at the 13th International Piano Competition Ettlingen (2012)
- 2nd Prize at the International Rachmaninov Competition in Frankfurt (2010)
- 1st Prize at the Concours Musical de France in Paris (2009)

He has also twice been awarded the Saarland Special Prize for Outstanding Solo Performances.

== Scholarships ==
Jonas Stark is an alumnus of the following foundations:

- Casino Society Saarbrücken
- Countess of Munster Musical Trust
- DAAD (German Academic Exchange Service)
- Deutsche Stiftung Musikleben
- Studienstiftung (German Academic Scholarship Foundation)
- Hans und Ruth Giessen Foundation
- Imogen Cooper Music Trust
- Jürgen Ponto Foundation
- Konzertförderung Deutscher Musikwettbewerb
- Richard Wagner Society
