= Sibylla Rubens =

German soprano (born 1967)

- Born: 1967 (age 58–59)
- Education: Musikhochschule Frankfurt
- Occupation: Classical soprano

Sibylla Rubens (born 1967) is a German classical soprano, performing internationally, mostly in concerts and recitals.

== Career ==
Sibylla Rubens studied voice (concert and opera) at the Staatliche Musikhochschule in Trossingen and at the Hochschule für Musik in Frankfurt and in master classes with Edith Mathis.

She appeared on the stage of the Staatsoper Stuttgart in 1994 as Pamina in Mozart's Die Zauberflöte. In 1995 she sang the soprano part in Mozart's Great Mass in C minor on a Japan tour of the Bachakademie Stuttgart conducted by Helmuth Rilling. She performed Fauré's Requiem with the Royal Concertgebouw Orchestra under Philippe Herreweghe. Sibylla Rubens took part in the project of Ton Koopman and the Amsterdam Baroque Orchestra & Choir to record the complete vocal works of Johann Sebastian Bach. She has also interpreted Lieder, a first recital with Irwin Gage in 1999 at the Ludwigsburg Schlossfestspiele of Hugo Wolf's Italienisches Liederbuch with Thomas Quasthoff and Justus Zeyen. At the Rheingau Musik Festival 2009 she performed the soprano part of Bach's St John Passion with the Windsbacher Knabenchor, conducted by Karl-Friedrich Beringer.
