= Seong-hoon =

- Hangul: 성훈
- RR: Seonghun
- MR: Sŏnghun

Seong-hoon, also spelled Sung-hoon, is a Korean given name. It was the fifth-most popular name for baby boys in South Korea in 1970, falling to sixth place in 1980.

People with this name include:

== Entertainers ==
- Sung Hoon (actor) (born Bang Sung-hoon, 1983), South Korean actor
- Kang Sung-hoon (singer) (born 1980), South Korean singer
- Kim Seong-hun (filmmaker) (born 1971), South Korean director
- Kim Sung-hoon (director) (born 1974), South Korean director
- Sung-hoon Kim (born 1978), South Korean pianist
- Ha Jung-woo (born Kim Sung-hoon, 1979), South Korean actor
- Park Sung-hoon (born 1985), South Korean actor
- Sunghoon (singer, born 2002) (born Park Sung-hoon, 2002), South Korean singer, member of boy band Enhypen

== Sportspeople ==
- An Sung-hun (born 1982), South Korean football player
- Cheon Seong-hoon (born 2000), South Korean football player
- Cho Sung-hoon (skier) (born 1964), South Korean football player
- Cho Sung-hoon (footballer) (born 1998), South Korean football player
- Choi Sung-hoon (born 1989), South Korean baseball player
- Yoshihiro Akiyama (born Choo Sung-hoon, 1975), Japanese mixed martial artist
- Jeong Seong-hoon (born 1980), South Korean baseball player
- Jeong Shung-hoon (born 1979), South Korean football player
- Jung Sung-hoon (born 1968), South Korean football player
- Kang Sung-hoon (golfer) (born 1987), South Korean golfer
- Lee Sung-hun, South Korean judo athlete
- Yoon Sung-hoon (born 1983), South Korean field hockey player

== Other ==
- Kim Sung-hoon (biologist) (born 1958), South Korean biologist

== See also ==
- List of Korean given names
