= Paul Baumgartner =

Swiss pianist (1903–1976)

Paul Baumgartner (21 July 1903 – 19 October 1976) was a Swiss pianist.

Baumgartner was born in Altstätten, Switzerland, to Johann Viktor Baumgartner, a church organist, and Hedwig Julia Baumgartner (née Eberle). At the age of 12, Paul Baumgartner wrote The Seven Searchers and other poems. After completing the Gymnasium of St. Gallen, he studied piano and composition under Walter Braunfels in the Hochschule für Musik und Theater München and under Eduard Erdmann in Köln.

Between 1927 and 1935, Baumgartner taught at the Rheinische Musikschule in Cologne. Fleeing from the rise of the Nazis, he took up residence in Basel in Switzerland again, where he taught in the conservatory between 1960 and 1971.

A pianist, he was one of the musicians who rallied around the cellist Casals and played in the first Casals festival. He recorded the Bach sonatas for viola da gamba with Casals.

In 1962, he was awarded the Kunstpreis der Stadt St. Gallen.

He died in 1976 in Locarno, Switzerland at the age of 74. Nowadays, he is mainly remembered as a teacher, numbering among his pupils are Alfred Brendel, Karl Engel, Arie Vardi, Peter Efler, and the conductor Günter Wand.

The Swiss painter Urban Zacharias Wick painted his lifesize portrait which is now exhibited and owned by the Kunstmuseum Rheintal.
