= Rainer Seegers =

- Born: August 6, 1952 (age 72); Dessau, East Germany
- Occupation: Percussionist
- Instrument: Timpani
- Member of: Berlin Philharmonic

Rainer Seegers (born 6 August 1952 in Dessau) is a German percussionist, former principal timpanist of the Berlin Philharmonic, tutor of the European Union Youth Orchestra and guest professor at the Hochschule für Musik "Hanns Eisler". Seegers is also a timpani soloist who has championed the unusual repertoire for timpani and orchestra.

== Biography ==
Seegers first musical influence was his grandfather, who was a trumpetist with the Gewandhaus Orchestra in Leipzig. After his family moved to Hanover, he studied percussion at the local Musikhochschule, although he had been performing professionally with the Hanover Staatsoper. Soon after he got his first principal position as timpanist of the Braunschweig Staatstheater, he left this position to join the Cologne Radio Symphony Orchestra. From 1977 to 1982 he performed with the Bayreuth Festival Orchestra. In 1982, Seegers joined the Berlin Philharmonic orchestra and was their principal timpanist until the summer of 2019.

Seegers is also a timpani soloist who has appeared as soloist with orchestras such as the Berlin Philharmonic and the Berliner Symphoniker.

Rainer Seegers served as faculty member of the Musikhochschule Hannover, the Berliner Philharmoniker’s Orchestra Academy and as a visiting professor at the Hochschule für Musik "Hanns Eisler" in Berlin.
