= Hong Kong International Piano Competition =

The Hong Kong International Piano Competition was first held in 2005. It is organized by the Chopin Society of Hong Kong. Its Honorary President, Vladimir Ashkenazy, serving as the jury's chairman.

The Hong Kong International Piano Competition is a triennial music event which brings some of the world's foremost pianists, musicians and master teachers to entertain and educate music students and music lovers in Hong Kong.

== The 4th Hong Kong International Piano Competition and Joy of Music Festival ==
The Competition logo for the 2014 edition

The 4th edition of the competition will be held from 10–27 October 2014 at Hong Kong City Hall, parallel with the Joy of Music Festival which is also organized by the Chopin Society of Hong Kong.

The piano competition consists of four rounds. The first round takes place from 10 to 14 October, the second round (quarter finals) from 16 to 18 October, the third round (semi finals) on 20 and 21 October and the fourth and final round on 22, 23 and 24 October.

After the last performance, the jury will deliberate and announce the first, second, third, fourth, fifth and sixth prize winners of the 4th Hong Kong International Piano Competition.

The Jury members for the 2014 competition are : Vladimir Ashkenazy (chairman), Li Ming Qiang (Deputy Chairman), Tigran Alikhanov, Thorunn Ashkenazy, Peter Frankl, Gary Graffman, Gabriel Kwok, Pascal Roge, Jeremy Siepmann, Mikhail Voskresensky and Eleanor Wong.

== Joy of Music Festival 2014 ==
The Joy of Music Festival consists of workshops, master classes and gala performances. Andrew Walter, Abbey Road studios mastering engineer, will present an illustrated talk titled "Back to the Future - A Journey of Sound" on the history of recording music and sound from 1898 to the modern day. The composer Henry Lai Wan-man will provide insights into what it takes to compose music for films. Producer and director of music documentaries Christopher Nupen will present an illustrated talk on what films can do for music.

The gala performances feature the winning contestants for 2014, past winners of the competition, and performances by the members of the jury.

== Postponement of The 4th Hong Kong International Piano Competition and Joy of Music Festival 2014 ==
Due to the continuing civil disobedience campaign and protests in Hong Kong, the decision was made by the Chopin Society to postpone the piano competition until November 2016 and the Joy of Music Festival to October 2015.

However, the Chopin Society of Hong Kong as a "Thank You" to its friends and audience is organizing three piano recitals by the past three first prize winners of the Hong Kong International Piano Competition. These will take place at the Hong Kong City Hall on Friday 24 October (Ilya Rashkovsky 2005 winner), Saturday 25 October (Jin Sang Lee 2008 winner) and Sunday 26 October (Giuseppe Andaloro 2011 winner). The 3 past winners will also lead master classes at the same venue on the morning of 25, 26 and 27 October.

== Palmares ==
Year
2005	1st Prize	2nd Prize	3rd Prize	Finalists
	(Russia) Ilya Rashkovsky	(China) Wen-Yu Shen	(South Korea) Sung-Hoon Kim	(Hong Kong) Ka-Ling Colleen Lee
				(Malaysia) Mei Yi Foo
				(Belarus) Andrey Ponochevny
2008	1st Prize	2nd Prize	3rd Prize	4th Prize
	(South Korea) Jin Sang Lee	(South Korea) Jong-Hai Park	(Germany) Miao Huang	(South Korea) Hye Jin Kim
				5th prize
				(France) Hélène Tysman
2011	1st Prize	2nd Prize	3rd Prize	4th Prize
	(Italy) Giuseppe Andaloro	(Japan) Keina Sato	(China) (Chinese Taipei) Min Hao Tsai	(South Korea) (Austria) Soo Jung Ann
2019	1st Prize	2nd Prize	3rd Prize
	(South Korea) Kim Hong Gi	(China) Shi Wen Ting	(Poland) Andrzej Wierciński
