= Sun Ho Lee =

South Korean pianist

- Born: 1988 (age 37–38); Seoul, South Korea
- Occupation: Pianist

- Sun Ho Lee
- Hangul: 이선호
- RR: I Seonho
- MR: I Sŏnho

Sun Ho Lee (born in Seoul, 1988) is a South Korean pianist.

== Early life ==
He began his musical career at the age of five, when he learned to play the violin.

At eight years old, he took up the piano. He previously studied with Chong Pil Lim at the Korean National University of Arts in South Korea. In 2004, he went to the Hochschule für Musik, Theater und Medien Hannover to further his studies with Vladimir Krainev. Sun Ho Lee has been refining his virtuoso skills since 2004.

== Career ==
In 2002 he won third prize at the 9th Missouri Southern International Piano Competition in Joplin, Missouri and in 2006, the sixth prize at the Shenzhen International Piano Concerto Competition in China. In 2008, he became the youngest semifinalist at the 37th Maria Callas Grand Prix in Athens, Greece and the 2nd prize and special prize as the youngest finalist at the 25th International Piano Competition in Porto, Portugal. He won the 5th prize at the 57th Ferruccio Busoni International Piano Competition in 2009 in Bolzano, Italy.

In 2010, he won a special prize for Prokofiev's Best Interpretation in Piano Campus International Piano Competition and was awarded e.V Young Korean Promising Pianist in Germany in 2012 and won the 2nd prize in PIANALE with 4 special prizes in Fulda and semifinalist in 16th Robert Schumann International Piano Competition in Zwickau.

In 2013, He won the 2nd prize Chopin International Piano Duo Competition Roma in Rome, Italy. In 2015 they won the Grand Prix of the First Korea piano duo competition in Seoul, Korea, and 2 Special Prizes at the 6th Bialystok International Piano Duo Competition in Bialystok, Poland and 1 prize with 3 special prizes in 10th Schubert International Piano Duo Competition in Ruse, Bulgaria and In 2016 Prize Winner prestigious Chicago International Duo Piano Competition in Chicago.

=== Concert career ===
He has performed in many venues including the Seoul Arts Center, Kumho Art Hall, Bechstein Hall, Young San Art Hall in Seoul, Shenzhen Grand Theatre in China, Megaron Concert Hall in Athens, Casa Da Musica in Porto, Gasteing in Munich, Uni Aula in Bonn.

Lee appeared as a concerto soloist: with groups including Shenzhen String Quartet, Shenzhen Symphony Orchestra, the Orquestra Nacional do Porto, Jessay Symphony Orchestra, Bolzano String Quartet, Jenaer Philharmonie Orchester, Bad Reichenhaller Philharmonie Orchestrer, Russe Philharmoniic Orchestra and Düsseldorfer Symphoniker Quartett.

He is a keen chamber musician: his chamber performance highlights include several concerts with violinist Hyuk Joo Kwun, Cellist Joon Ho Shim,

He participated in master classes with Vladimir Krainev, Karl-Heinz Kämmerling, Joaquin Soriano, Michel Dalberto, Eliso Virsaladze, Arie Vardi, Elisabeth Leonskaya, Lilya Zilberstein, Bernd Goetzke, Dina Yoffe, Genova & Dimitrov, Olivier Gardon.
