= Soo Jung Ann =

South Korean pianist from Seoul

Soo Jung Ann 안수정
- Born: Soo Jung Ann; 15 September 1987 (age 38); Seoul, South Korea
- Genres: Classical music
- Occupations: Musician, pianist
- Instrument: Piano
- Website: soojungann.com

Soo Jung Ann (Korean: 안수정; born 15 September 1987) is a South Korean pianist from Seoul. Ann was born to a musical family and started playing the piano at the age of six.

Ann received her bachelor's degree from the Korean National University of Arts in Seoul. She completed John O'Conor's postgraduate course at the Royal Irish Academy of Music and is pursuing a doctoral degree there, while also studying under Pavel Gililov at the Mozarteum University of Salzburg.

Ann has won several awards in international competitions. She received seventh place in the International Piano Competition in Hamamatsu and third prize in the AXA Dublin International Piano Competition in 2009. Ann attended the 15th, 16th, and 17th International Chopin Piano Competitions in 2005, 2010, and 2015, respectively, and attained the second stage in 2005 and 2015. In 2012, she won the 58th Maria Canals International Music Competition in Barcelona, and a year later, Ann became the first woman to win the International Telekom Beethoven Competition Bonn. Norwegian pianist Henning Høholt in a comment on Ann's performance of Beethovens 4th Piano Concerto in the finale in Bonn, praised her "tenderness, power and big virtuosity".

Ann has appeared as a soloist with orchestras in Asia as well as in Ireland and Poland. She has also performed at the Aspen Music Festival and School in the United States.

== Prizes and awards ==
- International Piano Competition in Hamamatsu, 6th prize
- AXA Dublin International Piano Competition, third prize
- 2011 Hong Kong International Piano Competition, fourth prize
- 58th International Music Competition Maria Canals of Barcelona, 2012, first prize
- 2013 International Telekom Beethoven Competition Bonn, first prize
