= Raphael Thoene =

German composer and musicologist

Raphael Dominique Thoene (born 17 March 1980) is a German composer and musicologist.

== Biography ==
Raphael D. Thoene obtained a degree in Composition (Robert Schumann Hochschule in Düsseldorf, Germany) and Music Theory (Folkwang Hochschule in Essen, Germany). A scholarship recipient, he studied Film Scoring and Composition at the Berklee College of Music, Boston (USA). He also received a PhD in Musicology at the University of Music and Performing Arts and the University of Vienna, Austria, writing his PhD thesis on Malcolm Arnold’s symphonic music. As a composer, orchestrator and pianist, Thoene received commissions for the Orchesterakademie NRW, the International Contemporary Music Festival Ensemblia in 2005 and the Niederrheinischer Musikherbst in 2006. He orchestrates film and theatre music, and is the author of the musical "Culture", and co-author of the chamber-opera "Der Herr Gevatter" (staged in Saarbrücken, Düsseldorf and Munich).

He is currently on faculty as a Lecturer in Music Theory at the Hochschule für Musik, Theater und Medien Hannover (Germany).

== Works (a selection) ==
- Brass Symphony No. I for Brass Band, opus 49
- Poèmes dramatique for chamber ensemble, opus 99, based upon the chamber-opera "Der Herr Gevatter"
- Concerto for Violin and Orchestra, opus 108
- Concertino for Trumpet and Orchestra, opus 109
- Sinfonia Concertante for String Orchestra, opus 121

== Publications ==
- Thoene, Raphael D. (2008-08-01). Malcolm Arnold: Symphonisches Schaffen, Stil und Ästhetik (in German). DE: Entercom Saurus Records/Edition Wissenschaft. ISBN 978-3-937748-08-5.
- Thoene, Raphael D. (2007-08-20). Malcolm Arnold - A Composer of Real Music: Symphonic Writing, Style and Aesthetics. US/DE/UK: Entercom Saurus Records/Edition Wissenschaft. ISBN 978-3-937748-06-1.
- Thoene, Raphael D. (2006-01-01). Das Instrumental-Rezitativ in den Clavierwerken Carl Ph. E. Bachs und Wilhelm F. Bach (in German). DE: GRIN. ISBN 3-638-47867-X.
- Thoene, Raphael (2005-01-01). Verwirklichung der Ideen Pestalozzis im Zeitalter von Pisa? (in German). DE: GRIN. ISBN 3-638-47868-8.
