= Wenyu Shen =

Chinese pianist

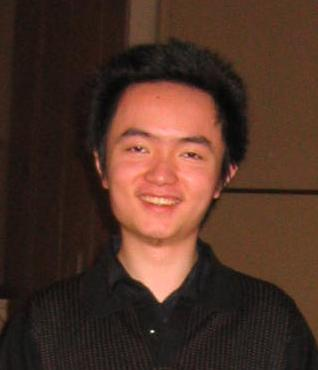
Shen Wenyu

Wenyu Shen (Chinese: 沈文裕; pinyin: shěn wényù; born 13 October 1986, in Chongqing) is a Chinese pianist.

Record of prizes
Year	Competition	Prize	Ex-aequo with...	1st prize winner	References
1998	(Germany) Ettlingen IPC(y)	5th Prize		(Japan) Rina Sudo	Ettlingen IPC(y)
1999	(Germany) Seiler IPC(y), Kitzingen	1st Prize			Cypres Records
2000	(United Kingdom) London WPC	Encouragement Prize		(Finland) Antti Siirala	The Independent
2003	(Belgium) Queen Elisabeth IMC, Brussels	2nd prize		(Germany) Severin von Eckardstein	Q. Elisabeth IMC
2005	(United States) Rachmaninov IPC, Los Angeles	1st Prize			Experience L.A.
2005	Hong Kong IPC	2nd prize		(Russia) Ilya Rashkovsky	Hong Kong IPC
