= Gintaras Januševičius =

Lithuanian musician

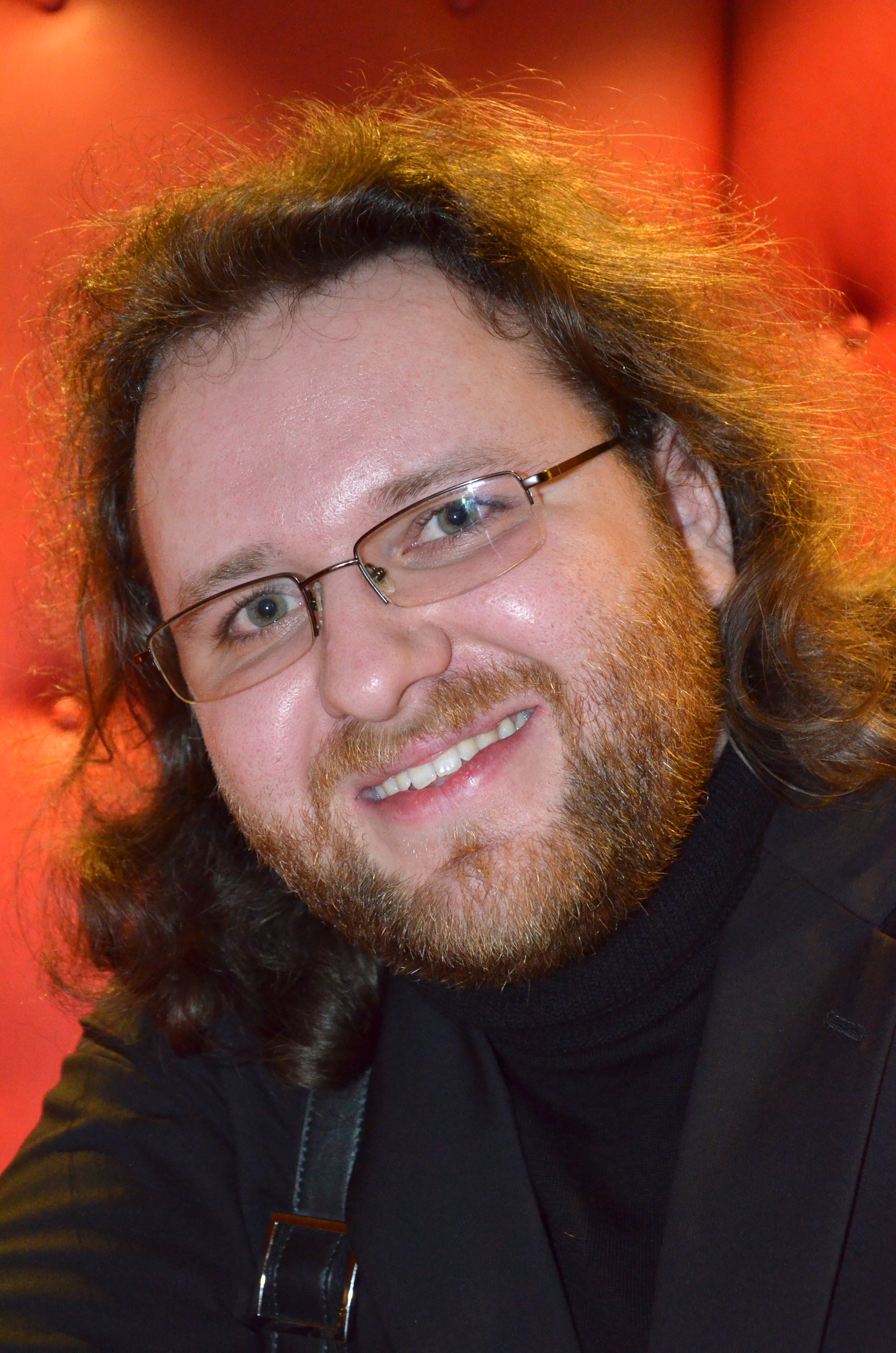
- Gintaras Januševičius in 2014
- Born: 16 January 1985 (age 41); Moscow, Soviet Union
- Citizenship: Lithuanian
- Years active: 1999–present

Gintaras Januševičius (born 16 January 1985) is a Lithuanian pianist, music educator, event producer and radio presenter. He performs narrative recitals and original interpretations; particularly that of Rachmaninoff, Chopin, Beethoven, and Shostakovich. His repertoire also includes work by Lithuanian composers.

== Biography ==
=== Education ===
Gintaras Januševičius was born in Moscow into the family of Lithuanian trumpeter Algirdas Januševičius and Tatar–Jewish composer Nailia Galiamova. The family left Moscow in 1987 and moved to Klaipėda. Gintaras began his musical training at the age of 4 at the Eduardas Balsys School of Arts of Klaipėda. In 1993 family decided to move to the capital, Vilnius, where his father was appointed the principal trumpeter at the Lithuanian State Symphony Orchestra, conducted by Gintaras Rinkevičius. Januševičius then entered the National M. K. Čiurlionis School of Art.

He took his first piano lessons with Valentina Potejenko in Klaipėda. Later he was taught by Valė Kulikauskienė (1993–1998) and Jurgis Bialobžeskis (1998–2003) at the National M.K. Čiurlionis School or Arts in Vilnius. After graduating in 2003, Januševičius entered the Lithuanian Academy of Music and Drama to study with Bialobžeskis. In 2004 he moved to Hanover, Germany where his professor was Vladimir Krainev. After his death in 2011 Januševičius joined the piano class of professor Bernd Goetzke at the Hochschule für Musik, Theater und Medien Hannover.

Since 2001 he has had lessons with Lazar Berman and his wife Valentina, Naum Shtarkman, Malcolm Bilson, Jurgis Karnavičius, among others.

=== Notable recitals ===
Gintaras Januševičius made his orchestra debut at the age of 15, performing Capriccio by Felix Mendelssohn-Bartholdy with the Lithuanian State Symphony Orchestra under the direction of Vytautas Lukočius. In the same month, he entered a Great Hall of Moscow Conservatoire to perform Piano Concerto No. 23, K. 488 of Wolfgang Amadeus Mozart.

Januševičius rose to fame in May 2004, after the performance at the semi-finals of the Montreal International Musical Competition. His interpretation of Études-Tableaux, Op. 39 by Rachmaninoff was publicly praised by pianists Jean-Philippe Collard, Akiko Ebi, Michel Dalberto and Lee Kum-Sing. Christophe Huss of Classics Today wrote:

Gintaras Januševičius glides, like an albatross. His semi-final and final performances were rare revelations for me; they fall outside the scope of competition ... because they are neither rankable nor quantifiable. All eyes were on Januševičius after the semi-finals, on which he had left his imprint as a kind of apparition from another place, notably with his performance of Rachmaninoff's Études-tableaux Opus 39. ... We saw him shake up the rhythms, moving forward, straight as a pin, with the simplicity of the master and the vitality of the young man he is. Never is it used for effect, never does the left hand try to gain the upper hand.

Januševičius has performed with orchestras, including the Montreal Symphony Orchestra, Lithuanian Chamber Orchestra, Lithuanian National Philharmonic Orchestra, Lithuanian State Symphony Orchestra, Shenzhen Symphony Orchestra, Estonian National Symphony Orchestra, Ural Philharmonic Orchestra, etc. and visiting famous halls, like Palau de la Música Catalana in Barcelona, Auditorio Nacional de Música in Madrid, Residenz Würzburg, Shenzhen Concert Hall, Salle Cortot in Paris etc. His solo recitals were organized across Germany and Lithuania, as well as New York City, Rio de Janeiro, London, Paris, Zürich, Warsaw, and others. He has participated in festivals, including the International Chopin Piano Festival in Duszniki-Zdrój, Besançon International Music Festival, Braunschweig Classix, Mozart Festival Würzburg, Dresdner Musikfestspiele etc. He performed Lithuanian premieres of piano concertos by Aram Khachaturian and Leroy Anderson, in addition to solo and chamber music premieres.

Since 2013 Januševičius's focus has shifted to narrative piano solo recitals. He started combining music, narration, programming, and theater elements in his performances. His most notable programmes up to date were "Dreamcatcher" (2014), "Complete Waltzes by Chopin" (2015), and "The New Colossus" (2019).

== Repertoire ==
Gintaras Januševičius is a Rachmaninoff scholar, having performed his complete works for piano solo. Other of his most performed solo works include Pictures at an Exhibition by Mussorgsky, Six Pieces for Piano, Op. 118 by Brahms, Dante Sonata by Liszt, "Waldstein" and "Moonlight" sonatas by Beethoven, Preludes, Op.34 by Shostakovich, complete Scherzi, Ballades, and Waltzes by Chopin, his own arrangement of the Rhapsody in Blue by Gershwin etc. He performed piano concertos by Mozart, Beethoven, Liszt, Tchaikovsky, Gershwin, Shostakovich, Khachaturian, Ravel, Martinu etc. As a performer of contemporary music he collaborates with composers like Jörg Widmann, Victoria Poleva, Ladislav Kupkovič, Nailia Galiamova, Derek Woods, and others.

== Recordings ==
Januševičius's solo performances are never found on audio CDs, as he believes that without his narration and timing, performances lose a great deal of their artistic uniqueness.

His sole recorded CD up to date was "Window to Lithuania" alongside the violinist Dalia Dėdinskaitė and the cellist Gleb Pyšniak for the "Ars Lituanica" label. The recording consists of rarely-performed works for piano trio by Lithuanian composers Čiurlionis, Dvarionas, Šenderovas, among others. His performance of the Piano Concerto No. 1 by Tchaikovsky also appears on the Double CD "V Tarptautinio M. K. Čiurlionio konkurso laureatai" (2007) on the "LMIC" label.

== Teaching ==
Since 2009 Januševičius has taught open master classes in Japan, China, Brazil, Switzerland, Germany, and United Kingdom, among other countries. Since 2017 he has been the artistic director and professor of piano at both "Feuerwerk" piano academy in Einbeck and "Klaipėda Piano Masters" summer festival in Klaipėda. In 2020 he joined the teaching staff of the Hochschule für Musik, Theater und Medien Hannover.

== Personal life ==
Januševičius lives in Hanover with his wife Brigita, whom he married in 2015. They have two children.

Since September 2021 Januševičius has co-hosted the radio show "Bazinis Akordas" on the Lithuanian National Radio and Television classical channel LRT Klasika.

== External links and references ==
- Official Website
- Gintaras Januševičius on Facebook
- Gintaras Januševičius on Instagram
- Klaipėda Piano Masters
