= Daniel Gortler =

Israeli musical artist

Daniel Gortler דניאל גורטלר
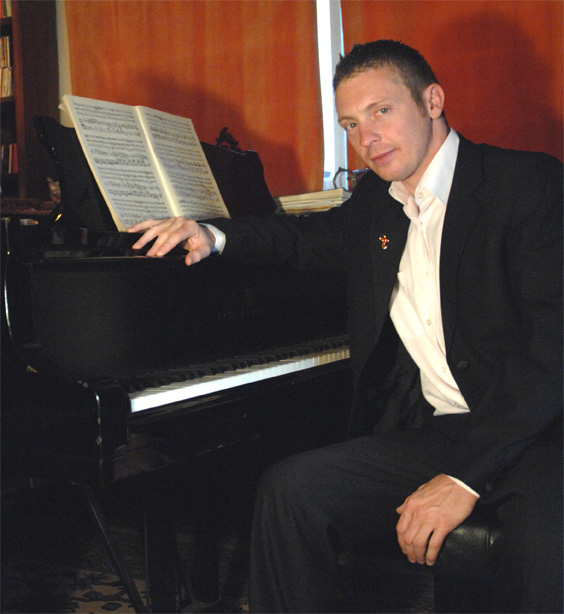

Background information
- Born: Tel Aviv, Israel
- Genre: Classical
- Occupation: Pianist

Daniel Gortler (Hebrew: דניאל גורטלר; born April 12, 1965) is an Israeli-American concert pianist.

== Education and early life ==
Born and raised in Israel, Gortler began studying classical music and piano with Ms. Naomi Hachohen. He graduated from the Rubin Music Academy at Tel-Aviv University and the Musikhochschule Hannover, studying with Prof. Arie Vardi.

Gortler was faculty member of the Buchmann-Mehta School of Music at Tel-Aviv University until 2011. From 2011 to 2013, he was a guest artist in piano studies in the Department of Music and Performing Arts Professions at New York University's Steinhardt School.

== Personal life ==
Daniel Gortler's partner is the architect Charles Renfro of Diller Scofidio + Renfro.

== Recordings ==
Gortler has recorded several albums with Romeo Records:

- Songs without Words
- Schubert Lieder with Sharon-Rostorf Zamir
- Schumann: Symphonic Etudes & Faschingsschwank aus Wien

In 2023, Gortler released his debut album with Prospero Classical, featuring a selection of Edvard Grieg's Lyric Pieces. The album, titled "Daniel Gortler plays Edvard Grieg - Lyric Pieces," includes 21 of Gortler's personal favorites from Grieg's collection of 66 short character pieces.
