= Nailia Galiamova =

Lithuanian composer

Nailia Galiamova (born 26 March 1961 in Tashkent, Soviet Union) is a composer, living and working in Vilnius, Lithuania.

== Biography ==
Galiamova studied piano and composition at the Vladislav Uspensky Secondary Music School by the Tashkent State Conservatoire from 1968 until 1979. From 1979 to 1984 she studied composition under the tutelage of Prof. Albert Leman at the Piotr Tchaikovsky State Conservatoire in Moscow, which she graduated with distinction. She furthered composition studies in postgraduate program from 1984 until 1989.

In 1984 she married Lithuanian trumpeter Algirdas Januševičius and in 1985 gave birth to her son Gintaras. In 1987 the family moved to Klaipėda, Lithuania. There Galiamova was a faculty member of the choral conducting department of Klaipėda Branch of the Lithuanian State Conservatoire. In 1993 the family, already including their 1-year-old daughter Donata, moved to Vilnius. Since 1994 she has served as a supervisor of the record library at the Mikalojus Konstantinas Čiurlionis School of Arts, and has taught music analysis, orchestration, polyphony and composition.

== Performances ==
Galiamova's works were performed in various concerts, competitions and festivals in Tashkent, Moscow, St.Petersburg, Vilnius and other cities. In 1985 and 1987 All-Union students' and postgraduates' competitions her Piano Concerto was awarded first and Cello Sonata second prize.

In addition to large-scale instrumental compositions Nailia Galiamova has written pieces for piano and strings, songs and romances for soloists and choirs, and music for children. She chooses traditional genres, moderate stylistics (displaying features of neo-classicism and minimalism) and tonal harmonic language. The composer has made orchestral arrangements of a number of works by various composers for the Lithuanian State Symphony Orchestra, Lithuanian Chamber Orchestra, and St.Christopher Chamber Orchestra among others.

== List of works ==
=== Orchestra ===
- 1984 "Concerto" for piano and orchestra
- 1988 "Symphonic Dances" for bassoon and orchestra

=== Choir ===
- 1983 "Svirel zapela" on the verses by Alexander Blok for mixed choir a cappella
- 2009 "Forest Bells" on the text by Ramutė Skučaitė for children's choir and piano

=== Chamber ensemble ===
- 1984 "Sonata" for cello and piano
- 1985 "Chorales" for two pianos
- 2007 "Spell" for two pianos
- 2012 "Skomorokh" for flute and tambourine
- 2012 "City Hall Fanfares" for two trumpets and trombone
- 2013-2014 "Les rêves parisiens" for soprano, oboe, bassoon and piano

=== Voice and piano (another instrument) ===
- 1979 "Lullaby" on the verses by Afanasy Fet for soprano and flute
- 1979 "Three Romances" on the verses by Maximilian Voloshin for voice and piano
- 1981 "Four Romances" on the verses by Vahan Terian for mezzo-soprano and piano
- 1983 "In the Kingdom of Pale Moon" on the verses by Konstantin Balmont for soprano and piano
- 1986 Four Sketches for the short story of Takahasi "Season of Butterflies" on the text by Mitsuko Takahasi for soprano and chamber ensemble
- 2011 "Fairy's Tales" on the verses by Konstantin Balmont for soprano and piano

=== Instrument solo ===
- 1982 "Musical Moment" for piano
- 1990 "Sonata in C" for piano
- 1999 "Prelude and Toccata" for piano
- 2003 "Snowflakes Behind the Window" for piano
- 2003 "Your Turn to Catch" for piano
- 2003 "Two Cyborgs Angry at Each Other" for piano
- 2003 "Three Japanese Dolls Greet Each Other" for piano
- 2003 "How Do Honey Cakes Disappear" for piano
- 2003 "Lullaby" for piano
- 2003 "Polyphonic Notebook" for piano
- 2006 "Allusio" for trumpet
- 2009 "A Tale of a White Ox" for piano
