= Fumiko Shiraga =

- Born: July 5, 1967; Tokyo, Japan
- Died: January 13, 2017 (aged 49); Hamburg, Germany
- Genres: Classical
- Occupation: Pianist
- Instrument: Piano
- Years active: 1989-2017

Fumiko Shiraga (白神 典子, Shiraga Fumiko, July 5, 1967 – January 13, 2017) was a Japanese-German pianist, a revelation in her country in the late 1990s. She was well known in classical music through both CD recordings and public performances, particularly for her interpretations of piano concertos in disguise and transcriptions of well-known masterpieces for chamber ensemble.

== Biography ==
She began studying piano in her native Tokyo before the age of four, and when she was six, her family moved to Germany. She studied in Essen, Detmold and Hannover. Although born Japanese and well-versed in Japanese culture, she described herself as European and considered Germany her homeland.

In her training, she studied piano with Detlef Kraus (Folkwang Hochschule), Friedrich Wilhelm Schnurr (Hochschule für Musik Detmold) and Vladimir Krainev (Hochschule für Musik und Theater Hannover) graduating in 1995 with the highest honors. She achieved the highest distinction in her soloist examinations. Additional training came from international masterclasses with Nikita Magaloff, Yara Bernette, Jeremy Menuhin, Paul Badura-Skoda and Edith Picht-Axenfeld and from the Polish pedagogue Malgorzata Botor-Schreiber.

Fumiko Shiraga performed as a solo artist and with orchestras, as well as with chamber music ensembles. She was instrumental in reviving transcriptions (for flute, violin, violoncello and piano), by Johann Nepomuk Hummel, of some Mozart piano concertos. She recorded the two Piano Concertos by Chopin in a piano and string quintet transcription (1997) and then, in 2001 and in a similar arrangement, she recorded Beethoven's First and Second piano concertos, as well as piano music by Bruckner, including a piano arrangement of his seventh symphony.

For the last twenty years, she lived in Hamburg, where she died of breast cancer after a long battle with the disease in January 2017, just about four weeks after her last concert.

== Awards and distinctions ==
Several first prizes at the Young Musician’s Competition, the special prize at the International Schubert Competition in Dortmund in 1989; a scholarship from the Stendal Music Foundation In 1992, a prize (1993) at the International Chopin Competition in Göttingen, a new scholarship (1995) from Deutscher Musikrat (German Music Council, a member of the International Music Council) in Bonn and acceptance into the 40th National Selection of "Concerts by Young Artists" (1996).

Her CD featuring Mozart's Piano Concertos 22 and 26 was selected as Editor's Choice in January 2006. In the same year, her final CD in the Mozart-Hummel series, which included Piano Concerto No. 18 and the 40th Symphony was selected as CD of the Month by Piano News.

== Discography ==
- Beethoven: Piano Concertos Nos. 1 & 2 (Chamber version)
  Fumiko Shiraga - piano
  Orchestra/Ensemble: The Bremen String Soloists
- Bruckner: Piano Works
  Fumiko Shiraga - piano
- Chopin: Piano Concertos Nos. 1 and 2, Chamber version
  Fumiko Shiraga - piano
  Jan-Inge Haukås - double bass
  Orchestra/Ensemble: Yggdrasil Quartet
- Mendelssohn: Piano Concertos Op.25 & Op.40, Six songs without words (Chamber version)
  Fumiko Shiraga - piano
  Orchestra/Ensemble: Nathan Quartett
- Mozart: Piano Concertos Nos. 10 and 24 (arr. Hummel for chamber ensemble)
  Fumiko Shiraga - piano
  Henrik Wiese - flute
  Peter Clemente - violin
  Tibor Bényi - cello
- Mozart: Piano Concertos Nos. 20 and 25 (arr. Hummel for chamber ensemble)
  Fumiko Shiraga - piano
  Henrik Wiese - flute
  Peter Clemente - violin
  Tibor Bényi - cello
- Mozart: Piano Concerto No. 18 / Symphony No. 40 (arr. Hummel for chamber ensemble)
  Fumiko Shiraga - piano
  Henrik Wiese - flute
  Peter Clemente - violin
  Tibor Bényi - cello
- Mozart: Piano Concertos Nos. 26 and 22 (arr. Hummel for chamber ensemble)
  Fumiko Shiraga - piano
  Henrik Wiese - flute
  Peter Clemente - violin
  Tibor Bényi - cello
