= Derek Woods =

Canadian composer

Derek Woods (born August 10, 1982, in Winnipeg, Manitoba) is a Canadian composer, living and working in Berlin, Germany.

== Biography ==
Woods was taking private clarinet and piano lessons in his home city before entering the McGill University in Montreal. He graduated in 2004, being awarded Bachelor of Arts diploma in composition with highest honors. In 2004 he moved to Hanover, Germany, where he was studying at the Hochschule für Musik, Theater und Medien Hannover under Johannes Schöllhorn. He graduated in 2008 and now resides in Berlin.

== Performances ==
Up to date, Woods' works were performed in various concerts, competitions and festivals in Canada, US, Germany, Belgium, Slovakia, Estonia and other countries. His works were commissioned by Bratislava International Festival, Zydeco Festival, Royal Opera of Wallonia, among others.

In addition to large-scale instrumental compositions Woods has written pieces for clarinet, tuba and piano solo, songs for high and low voices, and music for children. He chooses traditional genres, moderate stylistics and tonal harmonic language.

== List of works ==
=== Stage works ===
- 2009 "Gibsland Love Story", Op.38, commissioned by Zydeco Festival, Opelousas
- 2013 "The Hoax", Op.42, commissioned by Royal Opera of Wallonia
- 2017 "Mac the Knife", Op.47, commissioned by the Madhatters Ballet Company

=== Orchestra ===
- 2002 "Symphony No.1", dedicated to Sergei Prokofiev, for chamber orchestra
- 2003 "Scherzo", Op.11 for chamber orchestra
- 2003 "Concertino", Op.14 for clarinet and chamber orchestra
- 2004 "Night in the Zoo", Op.16 for symphony orchestra
- 2005 "Clarinet Concerto", Op.25 for clarinet and symphony orchestra
- 2006 "Hanover Symphony", Op.26 for symphony orchestra
- 2006 "Konzertstück", Op.27 for bass clarinet and symphony orchestra
- 2006–2007 "Songs of Chippewa", Op.31 for symphony orchestra. 3rd Prize at the International Composers Competition in Sion, Switzerland, 2008
- 2018 "Concerto Gross'o", Op.48 for symphony orchestra

=== Chamber Ensemble ===
- 1997 "Variations on the Theme from the Motion Picture "Forrest Gump" for clarinet and piano
- 1997 "Clowns" for clarinet and piano
- 1998 "Andante" for Violin, Clarinet and Piano, later used as 2nd movement for Trio Op.5
- 1999 "Variations on the Theme of Paganini", Op.1 for clarinet and piano. Winning piece of the "Young Composers Competition", Montreal, Quebec, 2000
- 2000 "Sonata", Op.2 for clarinet and piano
- 2000 "Into the Woods!", Op.3 for clarinet, oboe, horn and piano
- 2001 "Canadian Suite", Op.4 for violin and piano
- 1999–2001 "Trio", Op.5 for violin, clarinet and piano
- 2002 "Whazaan", Op.9 for clarinet, bassoon and tuba
- 2003 "Tubee or not Tubee", Op.15 for two tubas
- 2004 "Rusty", Op.18 for trombone and tuba
- 2004–2005 "Suite", Op.20 for brass quintet
- 2005 "Variations on a German National Anthem", Op.23 for cello and piano
- 2006 "Fairy Tale", Op.28 for mandolin and piano
- 2007 "Homeland Fantasy", Op.29 for violin, clarinet and piano. 3rd Prize winner at the Bratislava International Festival, Slovakia, 2009
- 2008 "Schützenfest-Suite", Op.33 for brass quintet
- 2008 "D.O.P.E.", Op.34 for clarinet and piano
- 2008 "Farewell to Friends", Op.36 for clarinet, cello and piano
- 2009 "Motzstraße Sketches", Op.37 for flute and piano
- 2010 "On Death of the Beloved Mother", Op.41 for clarinet and piano
- 2011 "Two Pomo Dances", Op.43 for clarinet quartet, commissioned by Lagniappe Dulcimer Fete, Port Allen, Louisiana
- 2011 "To the Fallen", Op.44 for clarinet and piano, commissioned by Macdara O Seireadain and Gintaras Janusevicius
- 2013 "Cafe Kröpke", for bayan and chamber ensemble, commissioned by Plathner's Eleven Festival, Hanover

=== Voice and piano or another instrument ===
- 2002 "No More Britney", Op.10 for soprano and piano
- 2003 "Body and Soul", Op.12 for soprano, clarinet and piano
- 2004 "Monday", Op.19 for low voice and piano
- 2005 "I Hate Pink Carpets", Op.22 for voice, clarinet and piano
- 2005 "Three Sonnets", Op.24 on sonnets by William Shakespeare for soprano and piano
- 2010 "Where is Maddie?", Op.40 for high soprano, piccolo flute and toy piano
- 2013 "Anna Blume", for soprano and bayan, commissioned by Plathner's Eleven Festival, Hanover

=== Instrument Solo ===
- 1996 "Variations" for piano
- 1997 "Serenade" for piano
- 1998–1999 "Piano Sonata No.1" for piano
- 2001 "Piano Sonata No.2", Op.6 for piano
- 2001 "Numb Fingers", Op.7 for piano
- 2002–2003 "Etudes for Clarinet Solo", Op.13 for clarinet
- 2004 "Piano Sonata No.3", Op.17 for piano
- 2005 "Lullaby to the Moon", Op.21 for piano
- 2007 "Elegy for Bill Masterton", Op.30 for tuba
- 2007 "I is Black", Op.32 for piano left hand
- 2010 "Madis' Exam Piece", Op.39 for tuba, commissioned by Madis Vilgats
- 2013 "To the Fallen", Op.44b for piano solo, commissioned by Gintaras Janusevicius
- 2014 "Dreamcatcher", Op.45 for piano, commissioned by Gintaras Janusevicius
- 2015 "Piano Sonata No.4", Op.46 for piano
