= Thea Soti =

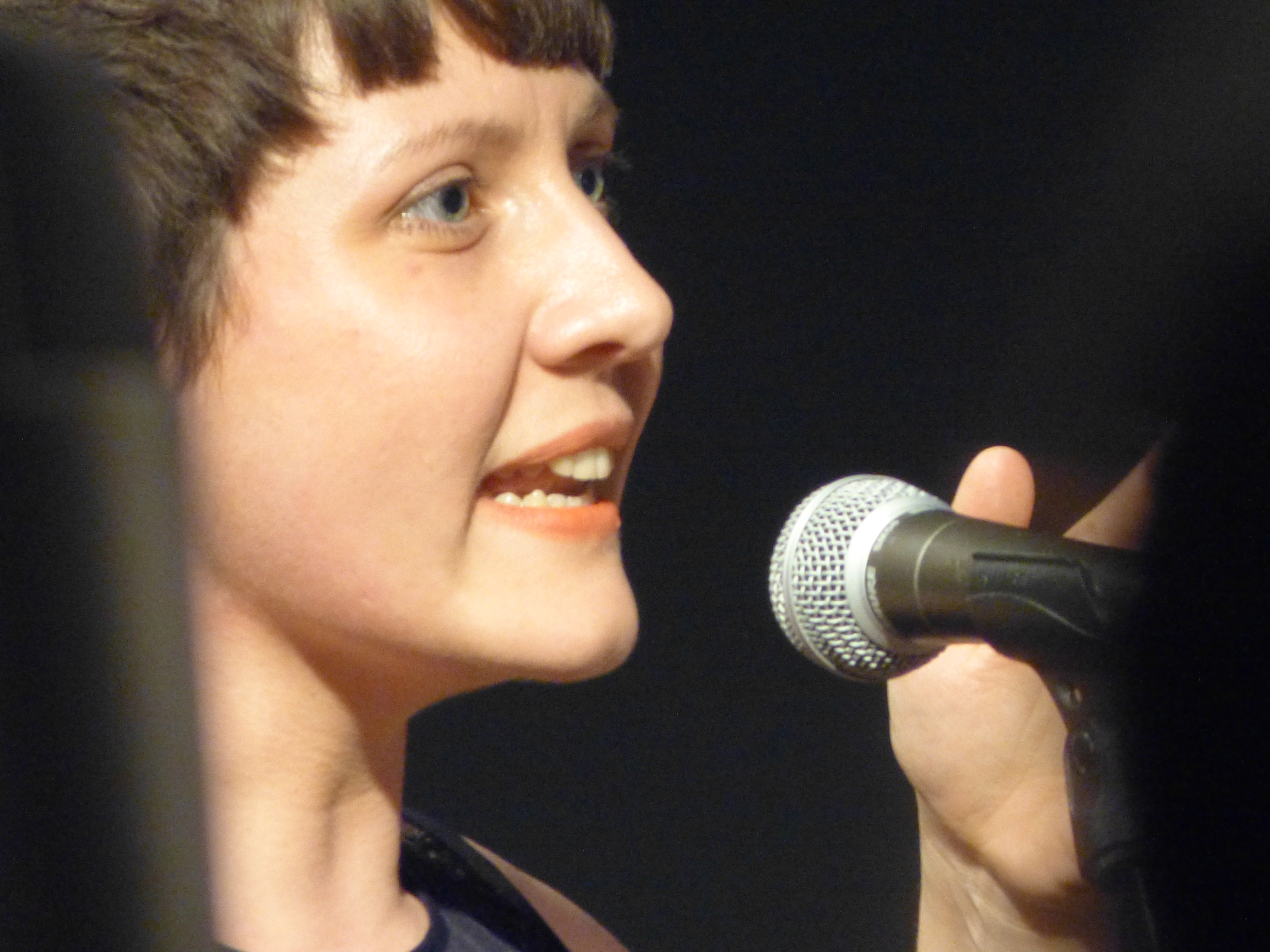
- Thea Soti (2015 an Loft (Cologne), Germany) (Photo by Annamarie Ursula)

Background information
- Born: 3 September 1989 (age 36); Subotica, Vojvodina
- Origin: Serbia
- Genres: Jazz, free improvisation, experimental
- Occupations: Musician, composer
- Instruments: Vocals, live electronics, percussion, piano
- Website: www.theasoti.com

Thea Soti (born 3 September 1989) is a vocalist, experimental sound artist, and composer.

== Biography ==
Soti was raised in a Hungarian family in Serbia, where she received classical musical training since her age six. As a classical pianist, she participated successfully in several international competitions. Later she engaged herself with jazz and popular musical styles in Budapest and Berlin. She studied jazz vocals and composition at the Hochschule für Musik, Theater und Medien Hannover, University of Lucerne and Hochschule für Musik und Tanz Köln. Her main focus is working with the human voice as an instrument and combining structures of free improvisation with open compositions, either for solo, small or large ensembles.

In 2010, she founded her world-music project "Nanaya" with Daniel S. Scholz (Oud), Johannes Keller (Double-Bass) and Jonas Pirzer (Drums), where she sings mostly in Hungarian. She has toured in Germany, Austria, Switzerland, Spain, Portugal, Hungary, Serbia, Czech Republic and Slovakia with different bands, among others with "Manivolanti", "Viktor Bürkland Trio" and "Thea Soti Quartet".,

She is part of the jazz trio "RYMM" with Salim Javaid (Saxophone) and Anthony Greminger (Drums).

She is a founding member of the Sung Sound composer´s collective, which initiates cooperation between young and up-coming vocalist-composers and European big bands. She is also known as a composer working with large ensembles (Modern Art Orchestra, DDSSBB, Subway Jazz Orchestra, Fette Hupe, Cherry Tree Orchestra, Tonhallen Orchestra, etc.).

In 2014, Soti won the 2nd prize of the international big band composing competition JazzComp Graz.

== Discography ==
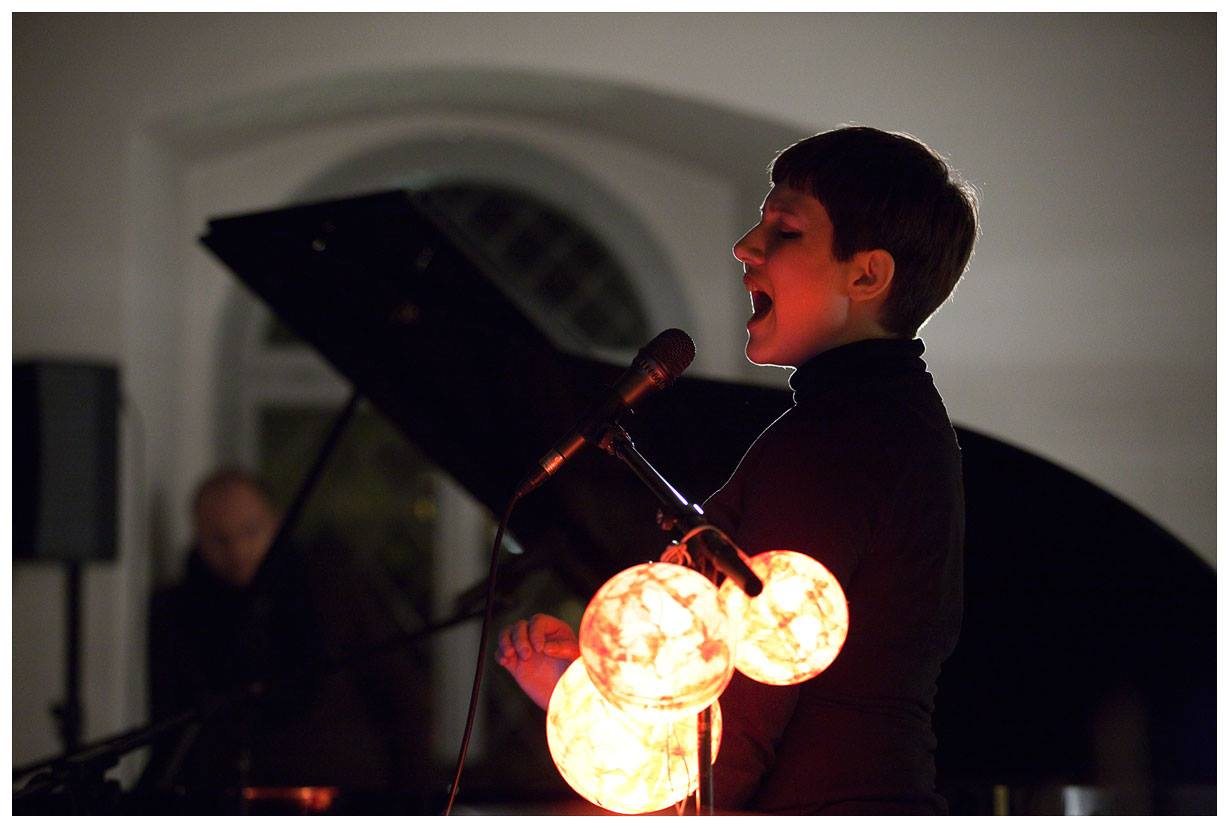
Live in Osnabrück, 2014 (Photo by Stephan Schute)

with Stijn Demuynck, Leonhard Huhn, Raphael Malfliet

- Pouancé (2016)

with NaNaya

- far.home.east (2016, quadratisch rekords)

with Mascha Corman & Salim Javaid

- Monsters For Breakfast (2016, Creative Sources Recordings)

with Die Daniel Sebastian Scholz Big Band

- DDSSBB (2015, quadratisch rekords)

with Adam Gallina, Tivadar Nemesi, Paul Schwingenschlögl

- Hang Caravan (2012, Morgenland)
