= Justus Zeyen =

German classical pianist and teacher (1963–2025)

- Zeyen in c. 2020
- Born: 9 June 1963; Kiel, Schleswig-Holstein, West Germany
- Died: 21 December 2025 (aged 62); Hanover, Lower Saxony, Germany
- Education: Musikhochschule Hannover
- Occupations: Classical pianist; Academic teacher
- Organizations: Musikhochschule Hannover; University of Music and Performing Arts Vienna
- Awards: Cannes Classical Award

Justus Zeyen (9 June 1963 – 21 December 2025) was a German pianist, especially an accompanist of lieder, and academic teacher. He was a regular pianist with Thomas Quasthoff, including acclaimed recordings. He was first professor at the Musikhochschule Hannover and then from 2020 at the University of Music and Performing Arts Vienna.

== Life and career ==
Born in Kiel on 9 June 1963, Zeyen first received violin and piano lessons, with Cord Garben among others. He received a scholarship of the Richard Wagner Foundation in 1987. Zeyen studied at the Hochschule für Musik und Theater Hannover with Martin Dörrie, Karl Engel and Bernhard Ebert. In addition, he took courses with Erik Werba and Hartmut Höll.

Zeyen focused on chamber music, especially on accompaniment of lieder singers. He gave concerts worldwide as a soloist, but above all as a lieder pianist, accompanying Juliane Banse, Florian Boesch, Measha Brueggergosman, Christiane Iven, Christiane Karg, Sibylla Rubens, Doris Soffel, Siegfried Lorenz, Dorothee Röschmann, and Bernd Weikl. Since their first joint concerts at the Kremerata Musica in Lockenhaus in Burgenland in 1994, Zeyen has worked regularly with Thomas Quasthoff. From 1998 to 2017, he performed at the Schubertiade in Schwarzenberg and Hohenems. He performed a recital with Michael Schade at the Vienna Konzerthaus in 2014. A reviewer noted that he employed "a consistently mellow, beautiful sound", capable of passage work and beautiful colours, mastering the challenges of lieder by Hugo Wolf. A reviewer from The Guardian noted about his recording with Quasthoff of Schubert's Schwanengesang and Vier ernste Gesänge by Brahms that he matched the singer in expressiveness, and that he regarded their recording of the Brahms was the finest version he knew.

Zeyen worked with radio choirs, including the choir of Bayerischer Rundfunk from 2002 and the choir of South German Radio. He made many recordings and broadcasts, such as a recording entitled Schubertiade with the choir of Bayerischer Rundfunk in 2022, playing a period Érard piano.

Zeyen taught correpetition at the Musikhochschule Hannover. He gave master classes in Tanglewood, Boston, New York City, in London and at the Schubertiade. From 2020 he was professor of lied and oratorio at the University of Music and Performing Arts Vienna.

Zeyen died unexpectedly on 21 December 2025 in Hanover, at the age of 62.

== Awards ==
- Cannes Classical Award 2001
- Echo Klassik 2001

== Recordings ==
- Lieder von Brahms und Liszt (with Thomas Quasthoff) DGG 477 7433 (2000) OCLC 950991456
- Franz Schubert: Schwanengesang, Johannes Brahms: Vier ernste Gesänge (with Quasthoff) DGG 471 0302 (2001) OCLC 965380338
- A Romantic Songbook (with Quasthoff) DGG 474 5012 (2004) OCLC 982250040
- Franz Schubert: Die schöne Müllerin (with Quasthoff) DGG 474 2182 (2005) OCLC 1034646612
- Schubertiade (2022)
