= Jinsang Lee =

South Korean pianist (born 1981)

- Hangul: 이진상
- RR: I Jinsang
- MR: I Chinsang

Jinsang Lee (Korean: 이진상; born 14 September 1981) is a South Korean classical pianist and a professor at Korea National University of Arts.

He came to international recognition by winning the Concours Géza Anda in Zurich in 2009 where he also became the first participant in the history of the competition winning all special prizes; the Audience Prize, the Mozart Prize and the Schumann Prize.

== Early life ==
Born in Seoul, Lee began piano playing at the age of 7, and started his musical education at Korea National University of Arts with Professor Daejin Kim at the age of 12. During his early life in Korea, he won top prizes at various piano competitions in Korea. After graduating in 2003, he journeyed to Europe to pursue further studies: from 2003 to 2006 at the Hochschule für Musik Nürnberg as a pupil of Professors Wolfgang Manz and Julia Goldstein, and at the Hochschule für Musik und Tanz Köln and Universität Mozarteum in Salzburg under the guidance of Professor Pavel Gililov.

== Career ==
Jinsang Lee has performed concerts with conductors such as Vladimir Ashkenazy, Michael Boder, Christopher Warren-Green, David Effron, Heiko Mathias Förster, Peter Gülke, Theodor Guschlbauer, Heinz Holliger, Eivind Gullberg-Jensen, Michail Jurowski, Roman Kofman, Jonathan Nott, Ola Rudner, Muhai Tang, Umeda Toshiaki, Mario Venzago, Christopher Warren-Green and Nikolaj Znaider. He has performed with orchestras, such as the Konzerthausorchester Berlin, Bamberg Symphony Orchestra, Neue Philharmonie Westfalen, Nuremberg Symphony Orchestra, Orchestra della Svizzera Italiana, Sendai Philharmonic Orchestra, Shanghai Philharmonic Orchestra, Tonhalle Orchester Zurich, WDR Symphony Orchestra Cologne, Vienna Chamber Orchestra and Zurich Chamber Orchestra.

He has performed at international music festivals including Busoni Festival, International Chamber Music Festival of Cervo, Musikdorf Ernen, Lucerne Festival, Menuhin Festival, Menton Festival, Montreux Festival, Piano Festival Ruhr, Seoul Arts Center Orchestra Festival, Hong Kong Joy of Music Festival and Wuhan International Piano Festival. Numerous invitations led him on the international concert stages, e.g. Konzerthaus Berlin, Louvre Museum, KKL Lucerne, Meistersingerhalle Nuremberg, Tonhalle Zurich and Konzerthaus Vienna.

A chamber musician, he is a member of the piano trio Beethoven Trio Bonn with violinist Mikhail Ovrutsky and cellist Grigory Alumyan and performs in various chamber music concerts.

== International awards ==
- 2001: 2nd Prize, Audience Prize, Sendai International Music Competition
- 2005: 1st Prize, Scarlatti Prize and Orchestra Prize, International Pianoforte Competition Cologne
- 2008: 1st Prize, Hong Kong International Piano Competition
- 2009: 1st Prize, Audience Prize, Schumann Prize, Mozart Prize, Concours Géza Anda

== Discography ==
- 2009: Live recording from the Concours Géza Anda 2009
- 2011: Hiller-Mendelssohn-Chopin Making Music Among Friends, recorded with both antique and modern Steinway pianos, The Alpha Omega Sound
- 2015: Schumann: Piano Sonatas for the Young, Op. 118 / 5 Gesänge der Frühe, Naxos
- 2017: Georgy Sviridov, recorded with the Beethoven Trio Bonn, Avi-Service for Music
- 2020: 3 Volumes of CD of Beethoven's piano trio works with Beethoven Trio Bonn, Avi-Service for Music
- 2021: Complete Beethoven Violin Sonatas with violinist Ju-Young Baek, Sony Classical

== Other career ==
=== Piano technique and manufacturing ===
In addition to his concert career, Jinsang worked for Steinway Austria and Steinway Hamburg to learn piano techniques and the manufacturing process. He worked at Steinway Austria for 2 years under the guidance of piano technician Stefan Knüpfer (featured in the docu-movie "Pianomania") while conducting his concert career at the same time. Subsequently, he moved to Steinway Hamburg to learn the piano manufacturing process to better understand the mechanism that makes the delicate sound of the piano.

=== Writing ===
From 2015 to 2016, Jinsang wrote monthly columns titled "Pianomania!" for Korean music magazine "The Piano" about his insights on piano techniques through the eyes of a concert pianist.

Since 2018, he has been writing monthly columns for the Seoul Shinmun newspaper in Korea.
