= Gergely Bogányi =

Hungarian musician

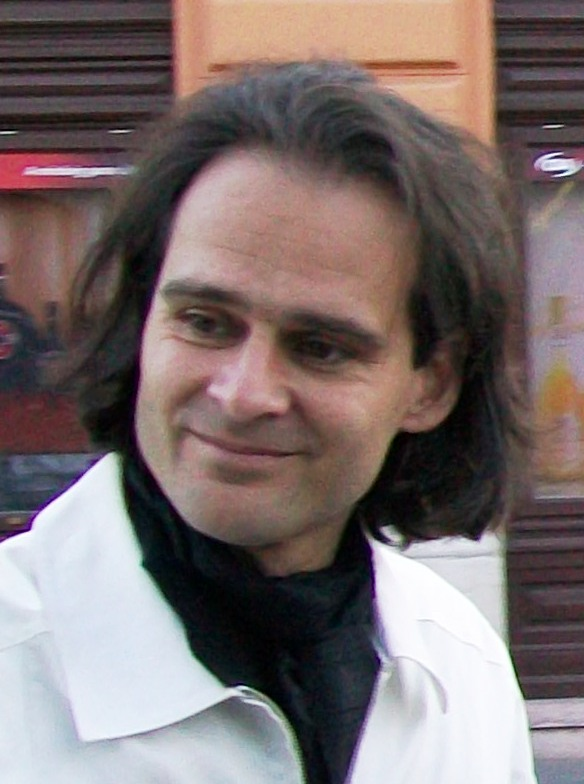
Gergely Bogányi

Gergely Bogányi (born 4 January 1974) is a Hungarian pianist. Coming from a musical family, Bogányi is one of the youngest pianists to have won the Kossuth Prize, becoming one of the leading pianists of his generation.

== Education ==
Bogányi was born in 1974 in Vác, Hungary (his brother is conductor Tibor Bogányi), and started playing the piano at the age of four. He continued his studies at the Liszt Academy in Budapest, the Sibelius Academy in Helsinki and at Indiana University in Bloomington with professors László Baranyay, György Sebök, Matti Raekallio.

== Piano Design ==
Bogányi, alongside his virtuoso piano playing, is known for his revolutionary piano designs including the Prestige B-262 and the larger Grand Prestige B-292, both of which are primarily constructed of carbon composites. “There have been no major developments in piano construction in over 100 years,” says Bogányi. The estimated cost of the project was just under €1 million (£750,000).

== Awards ==
Gergely Bogányi has had success in several national and international competitions.

- In 1996 he won the International Franz Liszt Competition in Budapest. The name of other competition winners may be seen on the official "Filharmonia Budapest" webpage.
- Gergely Bogányi was appointed a citizen of honour in his native town Vác at the age of 22.
- In 2000 he was awarded the Liszt Prize by the Ministry of Cultural Heritage.
- In 2000 the Cross Merit of the White Rose of Finland by the President of the Finnish Republic.
- In 2001 his series of "Chopin's complete piano works" received the Hungarian Gramofon Prize in the category of "Best concert event and performing artist in Hungary".
- On March 15, 2004 he received the highest artistic award of Hungary, the Kossuth Prize.
- In 2018 – Stockholm Culture Awards medal for classical piano, Stockholm

Bogányi has performed worldwide, and performs as a soloist with leading orchestras, for example the London Philharmonic in 2004.

On November 27–28, 2010 he performed all the compositions of Frédéric Chopin at Palace of Arts (Művészetek Palotája in Hungarian) in Budapest.

== Repertoire ==
Pieces for piano solo

- Mozart: Sonatas
- Beethoven: 10 Sonatas
- Schubert
  - Sonatas
  - Impromptus
- Schumann
  - Sonatas: F sharp minor, G minor
  - Fantasie C major
  - Papillons op.2.
  - Karneval op.9.
  - Kreisleriana op.16.
- Chopin: Complete
- Liszt
  - Sonata B minor
  - 12 Etudes d'execution transcendente
  - Zwei Konzertetüden
  - Annees de pelerinage
  - 6 Consolations
  - Rapsodies hongroises
  - Rapsodie espagnole
- Brahms
  - Variation and Fuge on a Theme by Handel op.24.
  - Zwei Rapsodies op.79
- Bartók
  - Study for Left Hand
  - 3 Burlesque op.8.c
  - Allegro barbaro
  - Sonatine
  - Suite op 14.
  - Etudes op18.
  - Improvisations op.20
  - Piano Sonata
  - Out of Doors

Concertos

- Haydn:G major
- Mozart
  - C major K. 467.
  - C major K. 246
  - C minor K. 491.
  - D major K. 451
  - D major K. 537. "Krönungskonzert"
  - D minor K. 466
  - G major K. 453
  - A major K. 414
  - A major K. 488
  - B flat major K. 595
  - Konzert-Rondo
    - D major K. 382.
    - A major K. 386
- Beethoven Nr.4. G major
- Mendelssohn: G minor
- Schumann: A minor
- Chopin:
  - Nr.2. F minor
  - Andante spianato & Grande Polonaise brillante
- Liszt:
  - Malediction
  - Nr.1. E flat major
  - Nr.2. A major
  - Dance of Death (Totentanz)
  - Hungarian Phantasy
- Brahms:
  - Nr.1. D minor
  - Nr.2. B flat major
- Tchaikovsky: B flat minor
- Grieg: A minor
- Rachmaninov:
  - Nr.2. C minor
  - Nr.3. D minor
- Furtwängler:
  - Symphonic concerto for piano and orchestra B minor
- Petrovics: Piano Concerto
