= Elisabeth Brauss =

German pianist

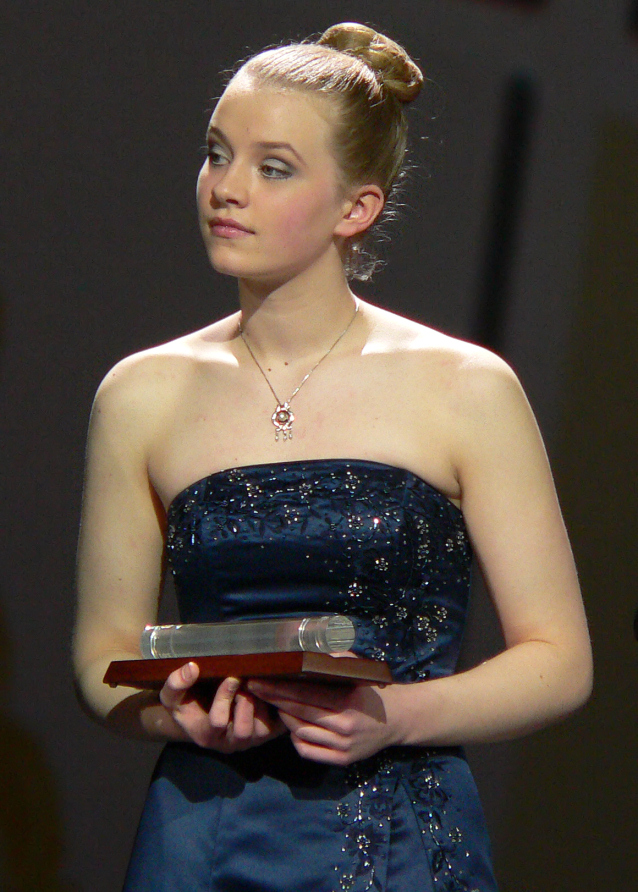
Elisabeth Brauß receiving the Praetorius Musikpreis in 2012

Elisabeth Brauss (German: Elisabeth Brauß, born 1995 in Hannover) is a German pianist.

Elisabeth is the daughter of the German pianist Martin Brauß. She began playing piano at the age of four. At the age of six, she got her first lessons from Jelena Levit. Later she studied at the Hochschule für Musik, Theater und Medien Hannover with Jelena Levit, Matti Raekallio and Bernd Goetzke.

In 2013 she won the Tonali Grand Prix in Hamburg, was awarded the first prize at the Kissinger Klavierolymp in 2016, and is a BBC Radio 3 New Generation Artist from 2018 to 2020. She debuted at the BBC Proms in 2021 and collaborates with the Wigmore Hall, London regularly.
