= Thomas Quasthoff =

German classical bass-baritone (born 1959)

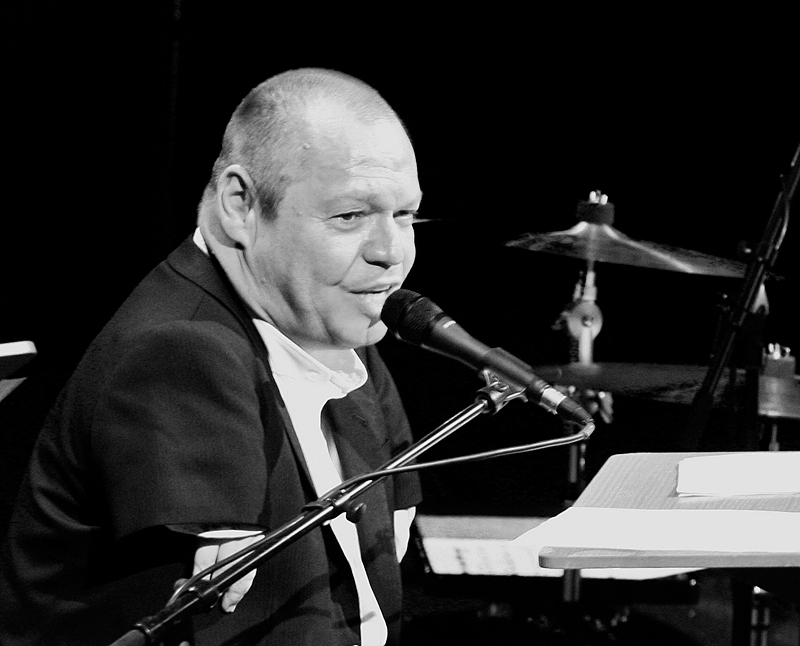
- Quasthoff, 2010
- Born: 9 November 1959 (age 66); Hildesheim, West Germany
- Occupation: Bass-baritone
- Website: www.thomas-quasthoff.com

Thomas Quasthoff (German: ['toːmas 'kvasthɔff], born 9 November 1959) is a German bass-baritone. Quasthoff has a range of musical interest from Bach cantatas, to lieder, and solo jazz improvisations. Born with severe birth defects caused by thalidomide, Quasthoff is 1.34 m (4 ft 4 3/4 in), and has phocomelia.

== Early life and career ==
Quasthoff was born in Hildesheim with serious birth defects caused by his mother's exposure during pregnancy to the drug thalidomide, which was prescribed as an antiemetic to combat her morning sickness.

Quasthoff was denied admission to the Hochschule für Musik, Theater und Medien Hannover, owing to his physical inability to play the piano, rather than a lack of skill required for entry to the conservatory. In the early stages of his education as a singer, Quasthoff was promoted by Sebastian Peschko. Thus, he chose to study voice privately. He also studied law for three years. Prior to his music career, he worked for six years as a radio announcer for NDR. He also did voice-over work for television.

== Music career ==
Quasthoff's music career was launched in 1988 when he won the ARD International Music Competition in Munich, earning praise from the baritone Dietrich Fischer-Dieskau. His performance of lieder was appreciated for its detail, directness and his vocal range and colour. In 1995, he made his American debut at the Oregon Bach Festival at the invitation of artistic director Helmuth Rilling; in 1998, he was one of the soloists for the festival's world premiere of Penderecki's Credo, the recording of which won a Grammy Award for best choral recording. In 2003, he made his staged operatic debut as Don Fernando in Beethoven's Fidelio at the Salzburg Festival, conducted by Simon Rattle. In 2004 he performed Amfortas in Parsifal with the Vienna State Opera.

Quasthoff recorded for Deutsche Grammophon (DG). In addition to recordings of classical repertoire, he released his first jazz album for DG in 2007, The Jazz Album: Watch What Happens, with Till Brönner, Alan Broadbent, Peter Erskine, Dieter Ilg, and Chuck Loeb.

For the 2006/2007 concert season, Quasthoff was one of Carnegie Hall's "Perspectives" artists. However, illness forced him to cancel his first two appearances in that capacity.

As artist-in-residence at the Barbican Hall, London, Quasthoff invited some of his favourite fellow artists in a series under the title Die Stimme (The Voice, also the name of his autobiography) which marked his 50th birthday. Quasthoff was a guest of BBC Radio 4's Desert Island Discs in February 2009.

In January 2012, Quasthoff announced his retirement from public performance. He cited various reasons such as illness, the strains of touring, and the death of his brother Michael from lung cancer.

He later returned to performance. This included appearing in concert in 2016, notably as the speaker in Schoenberg's Gurre-Lieder. He performed as Feste in the play Twelfth Night. He also performed with his jazz quartet and with a spoken role in a semi-staged opera at the Edinburgh International Festival in 2021.

Quasthoff is also a voice professor. He previously taught at the Hochschule für Musik Detmold, Germany. He is currently a professor at the Hanns Eisler School of Music in Berlin.

He led development of Das Lied, a biennial international song competition that started in 2009.

== Awards ==
Quasthoff has received three Grammy awards during his career to 2021. He won the Grammy Award for Best Classical Vocal Performance in 2000, for his recording with Anne Sofie von Otter of Mahler's Des Knaben Wunderhorn, along with the Berlin Philharmonic conducted by Claudio Abbado. His recordings of the songs of Brahms, Liszt and Schubert accompanied by pianist Justus Zeyen were nominated for the Grammy in 2000 and 2001. He won the Grammy Award for Best Classical Vocal Performance for the second time in 2004. It was for Schubert: Lieder with Orchestra which Quasthoff performed with von Otter and the Chamber Orchestra of Europe conducted by Abbado. Quasthoff won the Grammy Award for Best Classical Vocal Performance for the third time in 2006 with Rainer Kussmaul, the Berlin Baroque Soloists and the RIAS Chamber Choir in their recording of J. S. Bach: Cantatas. In 2008, he was a soloist on the Grammy-winning recording of Brahms's Ein Deutsches Requiem (Simon Rattle, conductor; Simon Halsey, chorus master) on EMI Classics.

He also received a Grammy in 2006 in the category Classical Vocal Performance.

In 2005, Quasthoff received Germany's Great Cross of Merit.

In 2009, he was awarded the Herbert von Karajan Music Prize. That same year he was awarded the gold medal for outstanding musicianship by the Royal Philharmonic Society.

== Personal life ==
In 2006, Quasthoff married Claudia Stelzig, a German TV journalist.

In a 2003 interview, Quasthoff revealed that he is an active political thinker, is a socialist, and was opposed to the Iraq War. He also expressed regret that the Israeli–Palestinian conflict could not be resolved via compromise.
