= Tok Tok Tok =

German acoustic soul band

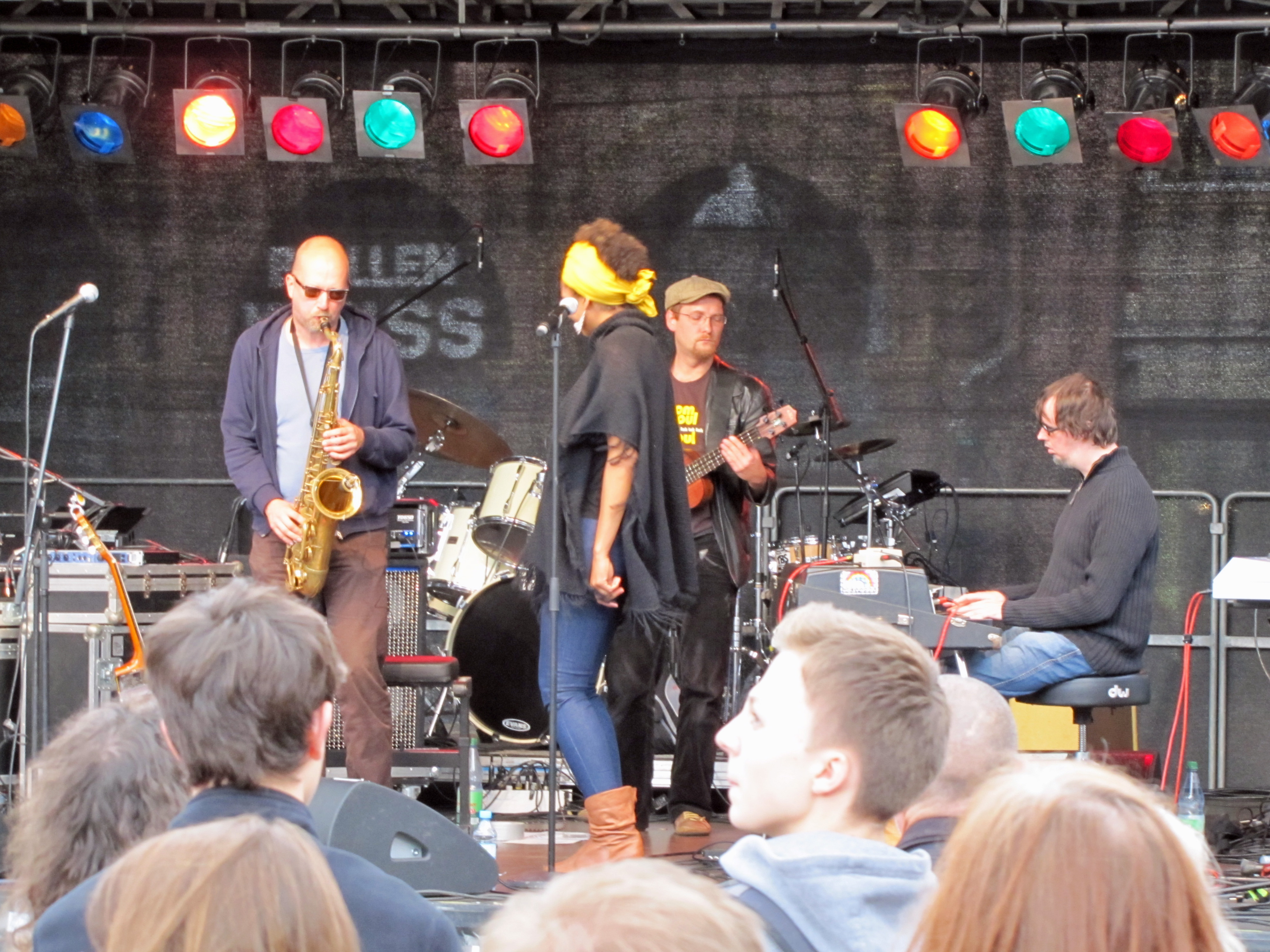
Tok Tok Tok in 2012

Tok Tok Tok was a German acoustic soul band, active between 1998 and 2013.

== History ==
Before founding Tok Tok Tok in 1998, Tokunbo Akinro (lyrics) and Morten Klein (composition and arrangement), the creative and organizing heart of the band, worked together in various other projects. Their musical search for melodic beauty associated with groove and soul led them to find their completing parts in each other. They played concerts all over the world from Paris, Berlin, Madrid and The Hague to Kyiv, Tel Aviv and São Paulo. In 2013, after 15 years of working together, Morten Klein and Tokunbo Akinro decided to have a break and to concentrate on solo projects.

== Members ==
- Tokunbo Akinro - vocals.
- Morten Klein- tenor saxophone, guitar, drums and mouth percussion.
- Christian Flohr - double and electric bass
- Jens Gebel - Fender Rhodes and other keys
- Matthias Meusel - drums (2006-2009)

== Discography ==
- 1998: This Can't Be Love (CD)
- 1999: 50 Ways to Leave Your Lover (CD)
- 2000: Love Again (CD)
- 2002: Ruby Soul (CD)
- 2003: It Took So Long (CD)
- 2005: About... (CD/LP)
- 2005: Live In Bratislava (DVD)
- 2005: I Wish (Best Off 99/00) (CD/LP)
- 2006: From Soul To Soul (CD/LP)
- 2007: Reach Out...And Sway Your Booty (live CD)
- 2008: She And He (CD)
- 2010: Revolution 69 (CD/LP)
- 2011: Live & Intimate (live CD)
- 2011: Was Heisst Das Denn? (CD/LP)
- 2012: Gershwin With Strings (CD)

== Awards ==
- German Jazz Award for "It Took So Long" (2003)
- French Grand Prix SACEM (Singing and Composition) for "About" (2005)
- German Jazz Award for "About" (2005)
- German Jazz Award for "I Wish" best of 99/00 (2005)
- DVD "live in Bratislava" (2005) nominated for "Award Of German Record Industrie"
- German Jazz Award for "From Soul to Soul" (2006)
- Spain "Reach Out and Sway Your Booty" (2007) nominated for the best Live Album 2007
- German Jazz Award for "50 ways to Leave Your Lover" (1999)
