= Choi Sung-hoon =

South Korean baseball player

LG Twins
- Relief pitcher / Coach
- Born: October 11, 1989 (age 37)
- Batted: Left Threw: Left

KBO debut
- April 28, 2012, for the LG Twins

Last KBO appearance
- August 6, 2025, for the Samsung Lions

KBO statistics
- Win–loss record: 8–9
- Earned run average: 4.14
- Strikeouts: 155
- Stats at Baseball Reference

Teams
- As player: LG Twins (2012–2023); Samsung Lions (2024–2025); As coach: LG Twins (2027–present)

Choi Sung-hoon (Korean: 최성훈; born October 11, 1989 in Seoul, South Korea) is a South Korean former pitcher for the Samsung Lions in the Korea Baseball Organization. He bats and throws left-handed. Choi was selected 16th overall by the LG Twins in the 2012 KBO Draft.

== Amateur career ==
Choi attended Kyunggi High School in Seoul. Choi gained national attention in 2007 when he threw a 16-strikeout no-hitter in the sixteenth round of the 37th Phoenix Flag National High School Baseball Championship against Busan High School.

Upon graduation from Kyunggi High School, Choi went on to enroll at Kyung Hee University in 2008. He had mediocre freshman and sophomore seasons, and missed the entire 2010 season after undergoing Tommy John surgery at the end of 2009.

As a senior in 2011, Choi enjoyed a standout career in which he went 4-2 with a 1.36 ERA in 8 starter appearances, striking out 45 batters in 53 innings pitched. After the 2011 collegiate season, Choi was first called up to the South Korean national baseball team for the 2011 Baseball World Cup held in Panama.

=== Notable international careers ===
Year	Venue	Competition	Team	Individual note
2011	Panama	Baseball World Cup	6th	2-0; 1.50 ERA (4 G, 12.0 IP, 2 ER, 9 K)

== Pitching style ==
Choi's best pitch is his power curveball as a left-hander, which is highly regarded. He also has a high 80s MPH fastball.
