= Sung-hoon Kim =

South Korean pianist (born 1978)

- Hangul: 김성훈
- RR: Gim Seonghun
- MR: Kim Sŏnghun

Sung-Hoon Kim (born 1978) is a South Korean pianist.

Record of prizes
Year	Competition	Prize	Ex-aequo with...	1st prize winner	References
2003	(France) Épinal IPC	1st Prize			Épinal IPC
2005	Hong Kong IPC	3rd Prize		(Russia) Ilya Rashkovsky	Hong Kong IPC
2006	(United Kingdom) Leeds IPC	5th Prize		(South Korea) Sunwook Kim	Leeds IPC
