= Karl Engel =

Swiss musician (1923–2006)

Karl (Rudolf) Engel (Birsfelden, 1 June 1923 – Chernex, 2 September 2006) was a Swiss pianist.

In 1952 Engel was awarded the second prize at the Queen Elisabeth competition. Throughout his concert career, he cultivated the art song repertory and worked extensively on works of Wolfgang Amadeus Mozart, Ludwig van Beethoven and Robert Schumann. He also held a professorship at Musikhochschule Hannover for three decades.

Engel was a student of Paul Baumgartner (1903–1976) at the Basel Conservatory from 1942 to 1945. After World War II, he studied with Alfred Cortot at the École Normale de Musique de Paris in 1947–1948.

Karl Engel toured internationally as a soloist with orchestras, a recitalist and a chamber music performer. He became particularly known for his complete cycles of Mozart piano concertos 1974–1976, Mozarteum Orchestra Salzburg, Leopold Hager (Till Engel & L. Hager playing the two double concertos KV 242 & 365) and sonatas, and the Beethoven Piano Sonatas. His performances of complete piano works of Robert Schumann during the 1970s were highly esteemed. He also distinguished himself as an accompanist, often appearing in Lieder recitals with Dietrich Fischer-Dieskau, Hermann Prey, Peter Schreier and Brigitte Fassbaender. Among his chamber music partners were the cellist Pablo Casals, the violinist Yehudi Menuhin and the Melos Quartet.

From 1958 to 1986 Karl Engel was professor of piano at the Hochschule für Musik und Theater Hannover, Germany. He led famous master-classes in France, Canada and Portugal. From 1989 he led master-classes in his homeland and abroad.

His son Till Engel (born 1951), is a pianist, and professor at Folkwang Hochschule Essen, Germany.

Karl Engel recorded the complete piano music of Mozart and of Robert Schumann and made numerous recordings with the singers Dietrich Fischer-Dieskau, Hermann Prey, Brigitte Fassbaender, Peter Schreier et al. He also recorded a remarkable account of Stravinsky's Piano Concerto.
