= The Jazz Album: Watch What Happens =

Studio album by Thomas Quasthoff
- Released: February 13, 2007
- Recorded: September–October, 2006
- Genre: Vocal jazz
- Length: 49:26
- Label: Deutsche Grammophon
- Producer: Hartmut Bender, Pino Brönner, Michael Schöbel, Michael Scholl

Thomas Quasthoff chronology
The Voice (2006)	The Jazz Album: Watch What Happens (2007)	Bach: Dialogue Cantatas (2007)

The Jazz Album: Watch What Happens is a 2006 studio album by the German baritone Thomas Quasthoff. The album was arranged by Alan Broadbent, Steve Gray, and Nan Schwartz.

Quasthoff was traditionally a singer of opera and lieder and this was his first album of jazz vocal music. The Jazz Album peaked at 19 on Billboard magazine's Top Classical Crossover Chart and was included on their European Top 100 Albums list.

In an interview with John Lewis in The Guardian, Quasthoff said that jazz standards and show tunes could be compared favourably with his usual repertoire of German lieder saying that "Of course I love Schubert lieder, but technically they are often simple folk songs. American show tunes are also folk songs in a way, but they are of a very high intellectual level. If you look at the quality of these compositions – harmonically, emotionally, lyrically – it is pure heaven".

== Reception ==
Professional ratings
Review scores
Source	Rating
AllMusic	4/5 stars

AllMusic gave the album four stars out of five. In its review, James Mannheim wrote that "Quasthoff has the great virtue of approaching standards as songs that have new and personal meaning for him. ... there's a certain wide-eyed quality of discovery in Quasthoff's jazz singing that's immensely appealing. ... Quasthoff croons, slides, caresses the microphone, whispers, and bends tones with the best of them." Manheim described Quasthoff's performances on "Ac-cent-tchu-ate the Positive" and "They All Laughed" as possessing a "solid, chunky rhythmic quality" and said of his performance on "You and I" that " ... one realizes most fully that one is hearing a rare vocal virtuoso, and that one enjoys a rare vocal delight to its fullest".

John Lewis, writing in The Guardian said that The Jazz Album had " ...none of the grim rigidity associated with the classical singer – instead, Quastoff glides through a selection of showtunes and standards with a relaxed sense of swing, and a soft American accent that recalls, variously, Lou Rawls, Bing Crosby and Nat King Cole." The album was also positively received by Christoph Loudon in The Jazz Times.

== Track listing ==
1. "There's a Boat That's Leavin' Soon for New York" (George Gershwin, Ira Gershwin, DuBose Heyward) – 2:56
2. "Watch What Happens" (Norman Gimbel, Michel Legrand, Jacques Demy) – 3:02
3. "Secret Love" (Sammy Fain) – 4:08
4. "You and I" (Stevie Wonder) – 4:52
5. "Ac-Cent-Tchu-Ate the Positive" (Harold Arlen, Johnny Mercer) – 3:54
6. "I've Grown Accustomed to Her Face" (Alan Jay Lerner, Frederick Loewe) – 4:53
7. "Can't We Be Friends?" (Paul James, Kay Swift) – 2:46
8. "Smile" (Charlie Chaplin, John Turner, Geoffrey Parsons) – 4:26
9. "They All Laughed" (G. Gershwin, I. Gershwin) – 2:18
10. "My Funny Valentine" (Lorenz Hart, Richard Rodgers) – 5:57
11. "What Are You Doing the Rest of Your Life?" (Alan and Marilyn Bergman, Michel Legrand) – 5:44
12. "(In My) Solitude" (Eddie DeLange, Duke Ellington, Irving Mills) – 4:30

== Personnel ==
- Thomas Quasthoff – vocals
- Till Brönner – flugelhorn, trumpet, vocal engineer, producer
- Axel Schlosser – trumpet
- Ruud Breuls – flugelhorn, trumpet
- Günter Bollmann – trombone
- Richard Todd – French horn
- Fiete Felsch – flute, alto saxophone
- Gary Foster – alto saxophone
- Andreas Maile – clarinet, tenor saxophone, flute
- Marcus Bartelt – bass clarinet, baritone saxophone
- Frank Chastenier – Rhodes piano
- Alan Broadbent – piano, arranger
- Chuck Loeb – guitar
- Karl Schloz – guitar
- Dieter Ilg – double bass
- Peter Erskine – drums, percussion
- Annemarie Moorcroft – viola
- Clemens Linder – violin
- Members of the Deutsches Symphonie–Orchester Berlin

Production

- Hartmut Bender – producer
- Alan Broadbent – producer
- Till Brönner – producer
- Steve Gray – arranger
- Nan Schwartz – arranger, conductor
- Tobias Lehmann – engineer
- Patrick Kirsammer – assistant engineer
- Bernie Grundman – mastering
- Anne Schumann – mixing
- Wolf Kampmann – liner notes
