= An Sung-hun =

South Korean footballer (born 1982)

Personal information
- Date of birth: 11 September 1982 (age 44)
- Place of birth: Incheon, South Korea
- Height: 1.76 m (5 ft 9 1/2 in)
- Position: Midfielder

Team information
- Current team: Daejeon Korail FC
- Number: 34

Youth career
- 1998–2000: Bupyeong High School
- 2001: Hanlyo University

Senior career*
Years	Team	Apps	(Gls)
2002–2003	Anyang LG Cheetahs	21	(0)
2004–2007	Incheon United	20	(0)
2008–2013	Gangneung City		
2014–	Daejeon Korail		
- * Club domestic league appearances and goals as of 4 December 2013

- An Sung-hun
- Hangul: 안성훈
- Hanja: 安成勳
- RR: An Seonghun
- MR: An Sŏnghun

An Sung-hun (Korean: 안성훈; born 11 September 1982) is a South Korean footballer who played as a midfielder for FC Seoul (then known as Anyang LG Cheetahs) and Incheon United in the K League. When he was in FC Seoul, He appeared on friendly match with France national football team during 2002 FIFA World Cup in GS Champions Park (France team training camp). He was played as temporary France national team player for Patrick Vieira.
