= Genova & Dimitrov =

Bulgarian piano duo

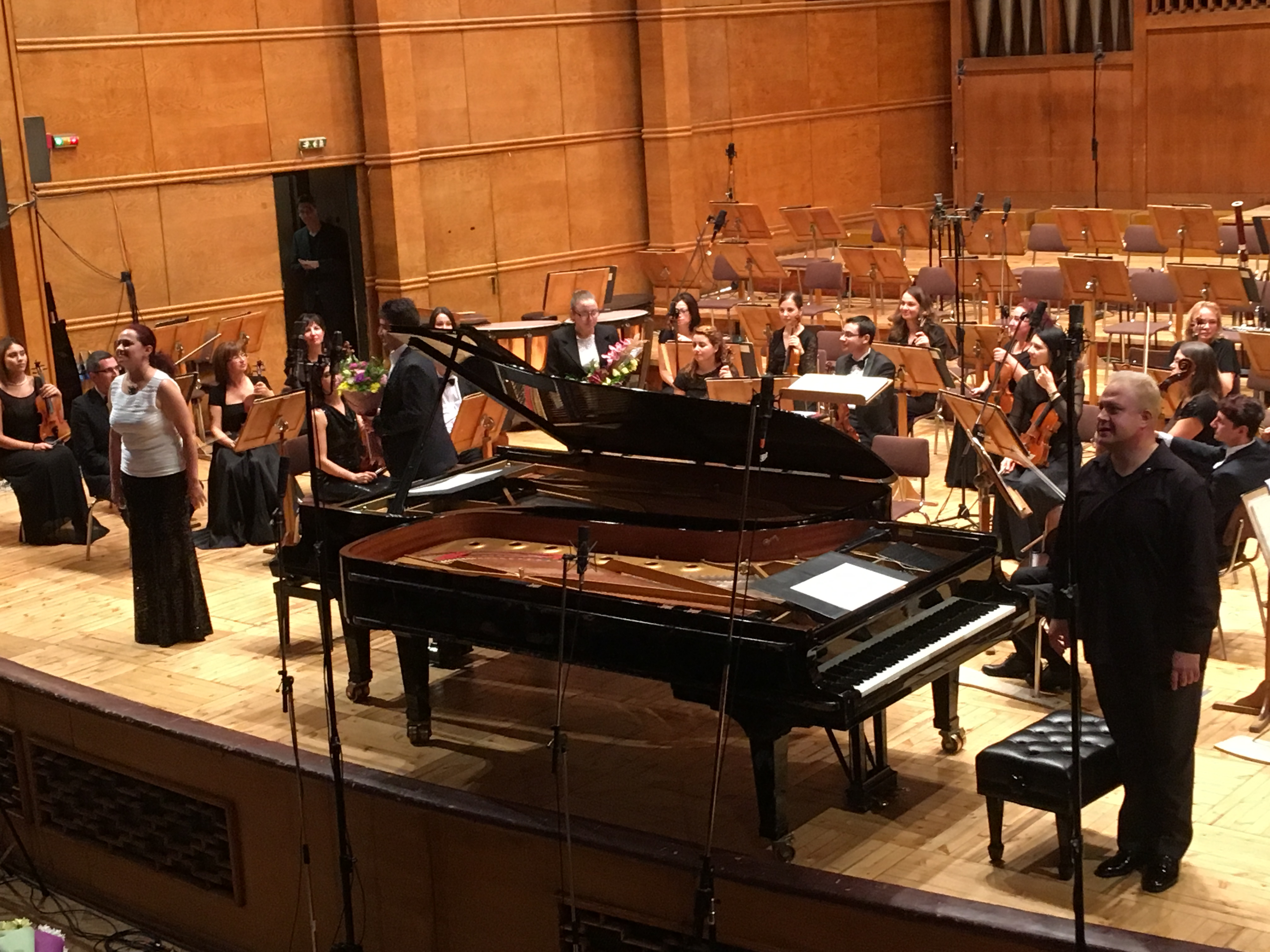
Genova & Dimitrov in Bulgaria Hall, 09.10.2017

Genova & Dimitrov (Bulgarian: Генова и Димитров) is a Bulgarian piano duo. The duo consists of Aglika Genova (Bulgarian: Аглика Генова) (born 29 June 1971) and Liuben Dimitrov (Bulgarian: Любен Димитров) (born 12 October 1969). They appear at two pianos and at one piano four-handed with recital programmes, as well as with orchestras.

== Competition career ==
Formed in the city of Hannover in 1995, the international concert career of the Genova and Dimitrov duo began with winning all the major piano duo competitions, including the 1996 ARD Music Competition in Munich, the 1997 Murray Dranoff Piano Duo Competition in Miami, the 1996 Tokyo Piano Duo Competition and the 1995 Bellini Music Competition in Italy.

== Concert career ==
Since then the duo has performed at the major concert halls of Europe, North and South America, Asia and Africa.

Festival appearances include the Schleswig-Holstein Musik Festival, Rheingau Musik Festival, Ludwigsburg, Schwetzingen, Gstaad, MDR Music Summer, the piano La Roque-d'Anthéron and Ravello festivals, the Music Festival of the Hamptons, the Chopin Piano Festival in Duszniki and the Lower Saxony Music Festival. In 2002 Genova & Dimitrov played at the opening of the Winter Olympics in Salt Lake City and performed for the EXPO 2000 world exhibition in Hannover.

In addition, the artists have appeared with, among others, the orchestras of the Bavarian, NDR Hanover, SWR Kaiserslautern, Bulgarian and Bucharest National radio stations, the Stuttgart Philharmonic, the New World and Savannah symphonies, the NDR Chor in Hamburg, Sofia Philharmonic, Beijing Symphony, Moscow Symphony Orchestra, Ukrainian National Philharmonic, the Cape Town and the Durban Philharmonics, Musica Viva Moscow, the Minsk Orchestra and the Polish Chamber Philharmonic, under conductors such as Eiji Oue, Ari Rasilainen, Alun Francis, Toshiyuki Kamioka, Leos Svarovsky, Robin Gritton and Alexander Rudin.

== Radio and TV appearances, master classes, associate professors ==
The Genova & Dimitrov duo has appeared on radio and TV broadcasts on all continents. They served as the youngest jurors of the ARD Competition in Munich and of the Almaty International Piano Competition of Kazakhstan. The artists have given master classes and workshops worldwide.

Since the fall of 2008, Genova and Dimitrov became associate professors of the Hannover State Academy of Music and Theatre and lead the special class for piano duo performance.

Among their students are duo Ping & Ting Chau, duo Kim & Lee (Hae An Kim & Sun Ho Lee) and many others.

== Family background, solo education ==
Both artists were born in Bulgaria of Greek origin, have been playing piano since the age of five, and made their orchestra debuts at the age of nine.

They studied solo piano with Ganev at the Music Academy in Sofia and since 1993 with Prof. Vladimir Krainev at the Hannover Music Academy. During their soloist training, they won many international solo piano competitions.

In 2005, the duo gained German citizenship.

== Discography ==
Named "Artists of the Year 2001", Genova & Dimitrov have released CDs on cpo including:

- Dimitri Shostakovich - Complete Works for Piano Duo: World Premiere Recording
- Johann Christian Bach - Complete Works for Piano Four Hands: World Premiere Recording
- Muzio Clementi - Piano Sonatas for Two
- Pantcho Vladigerov - Bulgarian Impressions, Complete Works for Piano Duo: World Premiere Recording
- Schnittke & Martinu - Concertos for Piano Duo: with the NDR Hannover Radio Orchestra, led by Eiji Oue; Concerto for piano duo by Alfred Shnittke and Bohuslav Martinu
- French Concertos - with the SWR Radio Orchestra, led by Alun Francis; Concertos for Two Pianos by Francis Poulenc, Darius Milhaud and Robert Casadesus
- America for Two - featuring works for two pianos by Gershwin, Copland and Bernstein
- Favourite Flavors - featuring the most significant works by Maurice Ravel
- Felix Mendelssohn Bartholdy - Concertos for Two Pianos 1 & 2
- Anton Arensky - Five Suites for Two Pianos

All these releases have won critical acclaim from major international music magazines and radio stations.

== Web Sources ==
- Library of Congress Sound Reference Center
- Hannover State University of Music and Drama
- http://www.classical.net/music/recs/reviews/c/cpo77283a.php
- http://www.klassik-heute.de/kh/3cds/20050809_16513.shtml
- http://www.compactdiscoveries.com/CompactDiscoveriesScripts/86LatinJewishAmerican.html
- http://www.morgenpost.de/printarchiv/kultur/article445313/CD_Tipp_Piano_Duo_Genova_amp_Dimitrov_cpo.html
- http://www.musicweb-international.com/classrev/2008/Apr08/Ravel_flavours_7772832.htm
- http://www.musicweb-international.com/classrev/2004/mar04/Clementi_two.htm
- https://web.archive.org/web/20090208204216/http://www.webconcerthall.com/interview/genova_dimitrov.htm
