= Martin Brauß =

German pianist, conductor and academic

Martin Brauß (born 1958) is a German pianist, conductor and music theorist and university professor at the Hochschule für Musik, Theater und Medien Hannover.

== Biography ==
Brauß was born in Mannheim. He studied music education, philosophy and Germanic studies, first in Heidelberg and Mannheim, in Hanover and then conducting in Berlin. He was an artistic assistant of Heinz Hennig with the Knabenchor Hannover while he was still a student, From 1985 to 1991 he was conductor of the Youth Symphony Orchestra in Hanover. In addition, he worked from 1987 to 1992 as concert artistic director at the Staatsoper Hannover and from 1989 to 1998 and led the Hanover oratorio choir. In 1992 he was appointed professor of music theory at the Hochschule für Musik, Theater und Medien Hannover. Since 2002 he has taught conducting and opera rather than theory. Brauss has worked as an accompanist and played a series of radio and recordings.

He is the father of the pianist Elisabeth Brauß.
