= Ilya Rashkovskiy =

Russian pianist

- Born: 17 November 1984 (age 41); Irkutsk, Russia
- Awards: Long-Thibaud Competition; 2001 2nd place Premio Jaén; 2005 1st place Hong Kong International Piano Competition; 2005 1st place Queen Elisabeth Music Competition; 2007 4th place Vianna da Motta International Music Competition; 2010 2nd place Arthur Rubinstein International Piano Master Competition; 2011 3rd place Hamamatsu International Piano Competition; 2012 1st place George Enescu International Piano Competition; 2014 2nd place
- Website: IlyaRashkovskiy.com

Ilya Rashkovskiy (Russian: Илья́ Григорьевич Рашко́вский; born 17 November 1984, in Irkutsk) is a Russian pianist.

== Education ==
Ilya Rashkovskiy debuted with the Irkutsk Chamber Orchestra at the age of eight. He studied from 1993 to 2000 at the Novosibirsk Special School of Music with Prof. M. Lebenzon, from 2000 to 2009 at the Musikhochschule Hannover with Prof. V. Krainev, and finally at the Ecole Normale Supérieure A. Cortot in Paris with Prof. M. Rybicki.

== Competitions ==
In 2009 he shared second prize at the Campillos International Piano Competition. He was among the top prize-winners at international piano competitions such as M. Long-J. Thibaud in Paris, Queen Elisabeth in Brussels, A. Rubinstein in Tel Aviv, and the 1st Hong Kong International Piano Competition. He won 1st Prize at the 8th Hamamatsu International Piano Competition in 2012. In 2015 he received the Jury Discretionary Award at the XV International Tchaikovsky Competition.

== Performances ==
Ilya Rashkovskiy has performed in important concert venues throughout the world, as well as in festivals such as La Roque d’Anthéron and Les Nuits du Piano d'Erbalunga in France, the Duszniki Zdroj Chopin Festival in Poland, and the "Joy of Music" Festival in Hong Kong. He has collaborated with the Russian State Symphony, the Kyiv National Philharmonic, the Gulbenkian Orchestra, the Czech National Symphony and the New Japan Symphony. He is also active as a chamber musician and accompanist.

== Recordings ==
He recorded the Seasons and the Sonata in c-sharp minor by Tchaikovsky on the Naxos label in 2008, Fantasies by Mozart, Chopin, Liszt, and Scriabin on Alpha Omega Hong Kong in 2009, Chopin Complete Etudes on Victor Japan in 2013, Stravinsky, Giuseppe Andaloro, Ravel, Lutoslawski, Giovanni Sollima and Monika Leskovar on Alpha Omega in 2014, violin sonatas by Reynaldo Hahn, Shinuh Lee, and Gabriel Faure, with Ji-Yoon Park on DUX in 2014, the complete Scriabin piano sonatas on NAR in 2015, and works of Mussorgsky, Rachmaninov, and Tchaikovsky in 2016 for La Musica, France.
