= Matti Raekallio =

Finnish pianist

Matti Juhani Raekallio (born 14 October 1954 in Helsinki) is a Finnish pianist.

Raekallio studied in Helsinki, in Vienna with Dieter Weber, in London with Maria Curcio, and in Saint Petersburg. In 1996, his doctoral thesis at the Sibelius Academy was Sormituksen strategiat (history of piano fingering). He debuted at Carnegie Hall in 1981. A professor at the Swedish Royal College of Music (1994–1995), Hochschule für Musik, Theater und Medien Hannover (2005–2010, 2014–) and the Sibelius Academy (1998–2008), Raekallio trained Antti Siirala and Gergely Boganyi at the latter. He is a scholar on piano playing technique and a former member of the Research Committee on Culture and Society of the Finnish Academy of Science and Letters. He taught at the Juilliard School from 2007 to 2014 while giving master classes in many countries. In 2014, he decided to leave the Juilliard School and started to teach at the Hochschule für Musik, Theater und Medien Hannover again. His most famous student is Igor Levit, who credits Raekallio as a major influence.

Since 2015, he has been back in New York City, teaching at the Juilliard School. Since the 2020–2021 season, Raekallio has been again Professor of Piano at the Sibelius Academy.

Raekallio was a jury member of the Arthur Rubinstein International Piano Master Competition in Tel Aviv and also in Shanghai, Vienna, Budapest and Tokyo.

Raekallio has recorded about 20 CDs, including Sergei Prokofiev's complete Piano Sonatas and Aarre Merikanto's, Anton Rubinstein's and Einar Englund's Piano Concertos for Ondine.

== Awards ==
- 2009 honorary doctorate Estonian Academy of Music
