= Giuseppe Andaloro =

Italian pianist

- Born: January 21, 1982 (age 44); Palermo, Italy
- Genres: Classical
- Occupation: Pianist
- Instrument: Piano
- Years active: 2002–present

Giuseppe Andaloro (born 21 January 1982) is an Italian pianist.

Andaloro was born in Palermo, and studied at the "Giuseppe Verdi" State Conservatory of Music in Milan. He also attended the Academy Mozarteum in Austria. Andaloro won the London World Piano Competition in 2002 and the Bolzano Ferruccio Busoni Competition in 2005, the Hong Kong International Piano Competition in 2008, among others. He has appeared in concert halls around the world, including performances with the London Philharmonic Orchestra, the NHK Symphony Tokyo, and Philharmonische Camerata Berlin.

He was presented with the Italian Ministry of Culture's Award of Artistic Merit in 2005.

During the Academic Year 2013-2014 he got his first teaching assignment to the "Giuseppe Nicolini" Conservatory of Music, in Piacenza.
