= Hochschule für Musik, Theater und Medien Hannover =

University in Hanover, Germany

Hanover University of Music, Drama and Media
- Hochschule für Musik, Theater und Medien Hannover
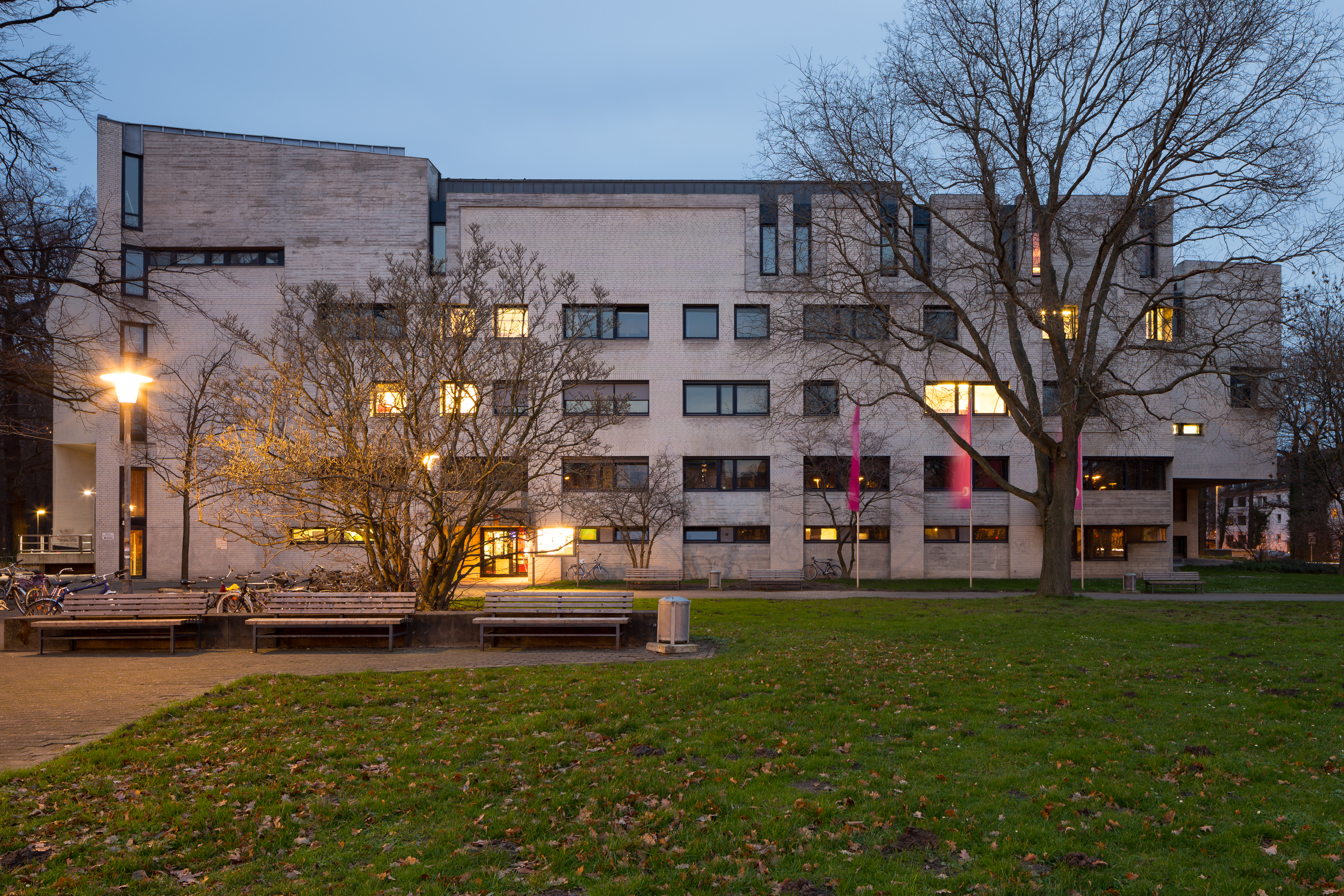
- Main building seen from across New House plaza (Neues Haus), main entrance near left
- Other name: HMTMH
- Former names: Conservatorium für Musik (1897–1911); Städtisches Konservatorium (1911–1943); Landesmusikschule (1943–1950); Akademie für Musik und Theater (1950–1958); Niedersächsische Hochschule für Musik und Theater and Niedersächsische Musikschule Hannover (1958–1962); Staatliche Hochschule für Musik und Theater Hannover (HMTH) (1962–2010)
- Type: Public
- Established: 1897: Private; 1911: Public; 1957: College; 1981: University
- President: Jörg Abbing
- Total staff: 469 (2024)
- Students: 1,427 (2024)
- Location: Hanover, Lower Saxony, 30175, Germany; 52°22′39″N 9°45′14″E
- Website: www.hmtm-hannover.de/en/home/

Hanover University of Music, Drama and Media (German: Hochschule für Musik, Theater und Medien Hannover; abbreviated to HMTMH) is a university of performing arts and media in Hanover, the capital of Lower Saxony, Germany. Dating to 1897, it has reorganised and changed names as it developed over the years, most recently in 2010 when it changed from State College of Music and Drama Hanover (Staatliche Hochschule für Musik und Theater Hannover, or simply Musikhochschule Hannover). From 2010 until March 2024, its president was Susanne Rode-Breymann. In 2026, Jörg Abbing was appointed president. As of 2024, the university has 1,427 students, and as of 2024 a total of 469 staff.

== History ==
The origins of the university date back to 1897 with the establishment of the private Conservatory of Music (Conservatorium für Musik). However, just over a decade later, in 1911, it became the conservatory for the city and changed name to Hanover Conservatory (Städtisches Konservatorium, also called Hannoversche Konservatorium). In 1943, during the Second World War, it became State Music School (Landesmusikschule). After the war, in 1950, it merged with the private Hanover Drama School (Hannoversche Schauspielschule) becoming the Academy of Music and Theatre (Akademie für Musik und Theater), before attaining college status (Hochschule) a few years later in 1958 (although back-dated to 1 April 1957) and being separated into the Lower Saxon College of Music and Theatre (Niedersächsische Hochschule für Musik und Theater) and the Lower Saxon School for Music Hanover (Niedersächsische Musikschule Hannover). However, on 1 October 1962 these two were recombined into the State College of Music and Drama Hanover (Staatliche Hochschule für Musik und Theater Hannover, abbreviated to HMTH and simply called Musikhochschule Hannover).

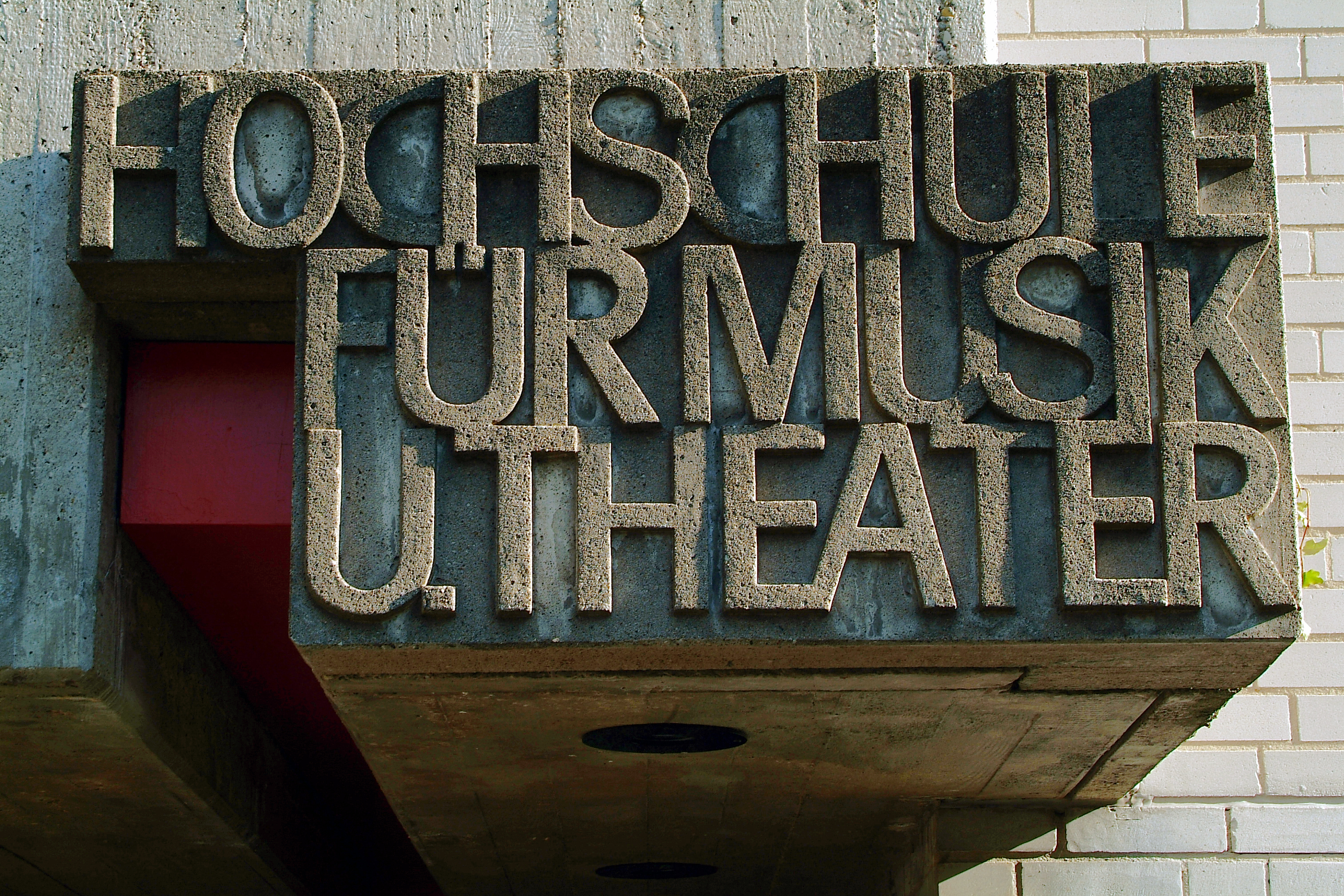
Old name fragment shown above the entrance of the main building constructed in 1970–73

Between 1970 and 1973 a new dedicated main building was constructed at the very edge of the Eilenriede city forest. In 1992 the European Centre for Jewish Music, established in Augsburg in 1988 by Andor Izsák and dealing with the documentation and reconstruction of Jewish liturgical music, was relocated to the Villa Seligmann, and which has since been an institute of the university. Since 2001 the university has had the Institute for Early Advancement of Highly Gifted Musicians (Institut zur Früh-Förderung Hochbegabter, abbreviated to IFF), and in 2010 the Institute of Chamber Music and the Institute for Early Music was founded.

== Facilities ==
From above, the main building of the university has the shape of an ear, which is also reflected in the university's logo. At the time of its construction it was one of the most modern buildings designed specifically for an artistic institution. In addition to the main building, the university has sites throughout Hanover:

- Hindenburgstraße 2–4 (Note: The house number follows the name of the street.) – Administration
- Villa Seligmann at Hohenzollernstraße 39 – formerly the home of a director of Continental, acquired in 2006 for the European Centre for Jewish Music and opened in 2012 after restoration
- Schiffgraben 48 – Institute for Music Psychology and Musician Medicine (Institut für Musikphysiologie und Musiker-Medizin)
- Seelhorststraße 3 – Research Centre for Music and Gender (Forschungszentrum Musik und Gender, Institute for Music Education Research (Institut für musikpädagogische Forschung and Institute for Music Sciences (Musikwissenschaftliches Institut)
- Expo Plaza 12 – Acting (Schauspiel) and Institute of Journalism and Communication Research (Institut für Journalistik und Kommunikationsforschung)
- Plathnerstraße 35 – Institute for Old Music (Institut für alte Musik)
- Uhlemeyerstraße 21
- Weidendamm 8 – Institute for Jazz, Rock and Pop (Institut für Jazz/Rock/Pop)
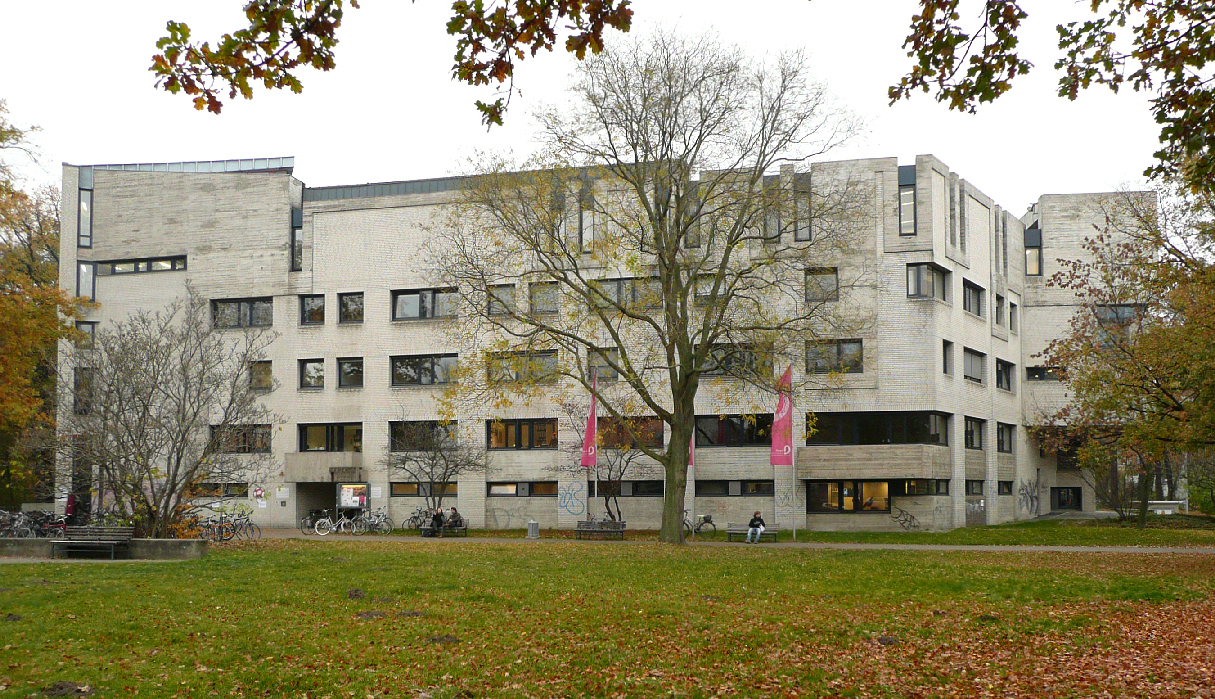
Main building, viewed from south-west

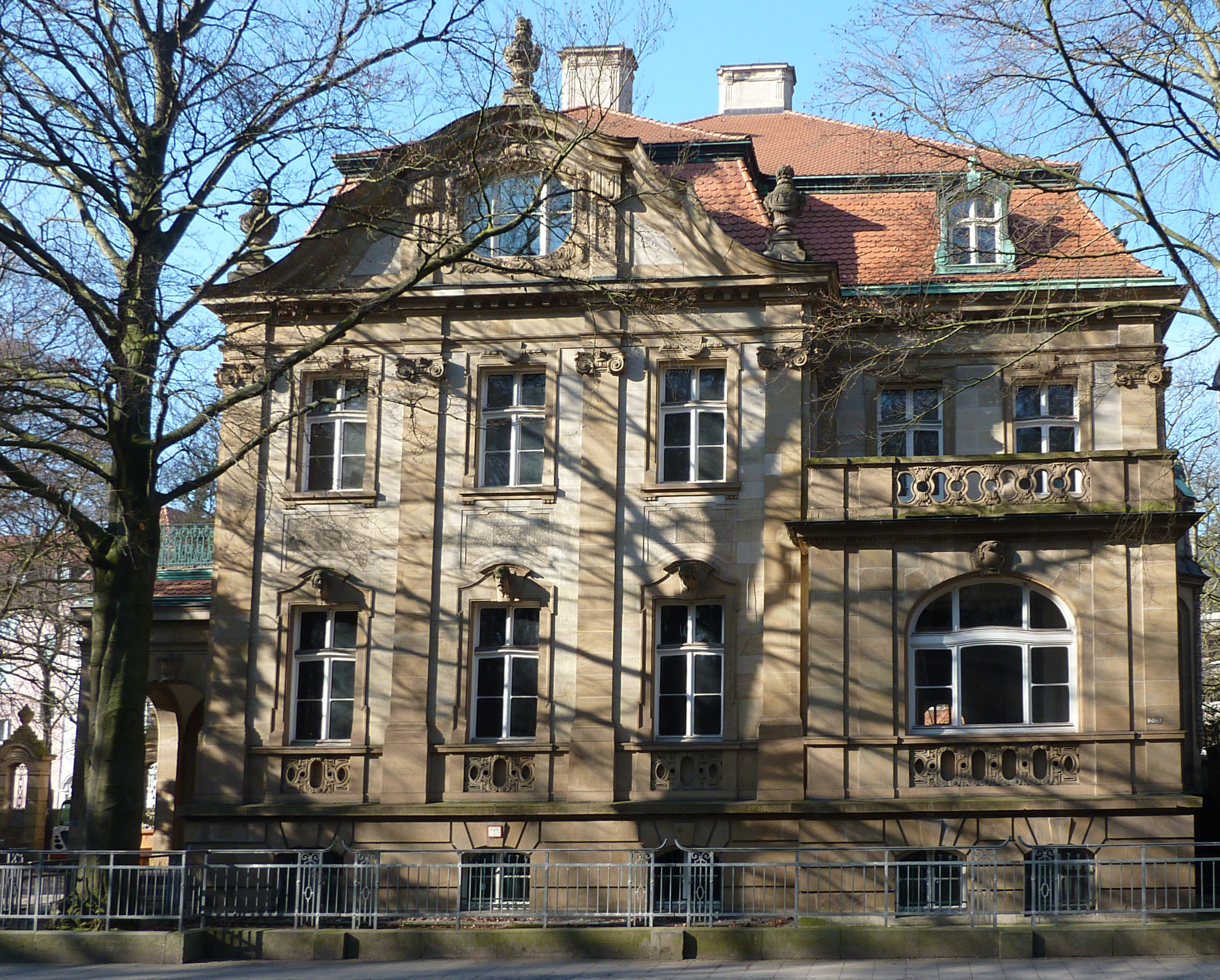
Villa Seligmann (Note: Built in 1903–1906, Villa Seligmann was almost unscathed by the aerial bombings of Hanover during World War II. Situated about 750 metres (2,460 ft) north of the main building, the villa has been used by the university for concerts and exhibitions since 2012.)

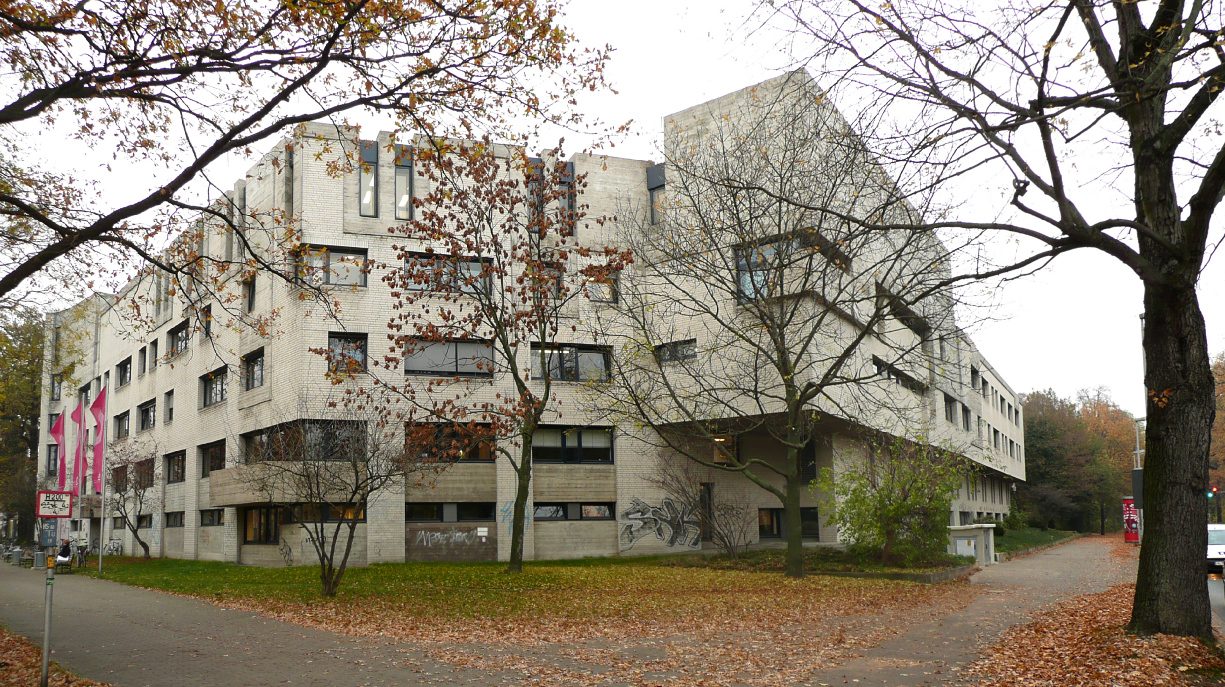
Main building, viewed from south along Fritz-Behrens-Allee in autumn 2011

== Courses ==
The emphasis at HMTMH is music education, artistic education, solo training, and theatre training. Also taught are jazz, rock, pop as part of a popular music program, with an emphasis on jazz. The study programs in the areas of piano, orchestra and chamber music are particularly pronounced, especially in artistic education and music education.

The drama and opera departments are in close cooperation with Hanover State Opera, Hanover Drama and the radio orchestra of the northern German broadcaster NDR. The university stages about two annual opera productions, including premieres, and about three orchestral concerts. The university also maintains artistic and scientific relations with several national and international music colleges and universities, including in Switzerland, Eastern Europe and East Asia.

== Organ ==
HMTMH owns an organ in the New Town Church, situated about 1.9 kilometres (1.2 mi) west-southwest of the main building, that is used for teaching and concerts. Called the Spanish organ, it was installed on the north balcony in 1998–2001 and reflects principles of Spanish Baroque organ building without copying a specific instrument.

== Notable people ==
The university has had the following recent presidents:

- 1979–1993: Richard Jakoby (since 1968 as director of the predecessor institution)
- 1993–1997: Peter Becker
- 1997–2003: Klaus-Ernst Behne
- 2003–2005: Katja Schaefer
- 2006–2009: Rolf-Burkhard Klieme
- 2010–2024: Susanne Rode-Breymann
- 2024–2026: Hans Jürgen Prömel
- 2026–present: Jörg Abbing

=== Lecturers ===
- Jonas Bylund, Trombone
- Theo Altmeyer, voice
- Markus Becker, piano
- Hans Christoph Becker-Foss, organ and early music studies
- Martin Brauß, piano
- Frank Bungarten, guitar
- Liuben Dimitrov (Genova & Dimitrov), piano duo
- Karl Engel, pianist
- Reinhard Febel, composition
- Aglika Genova (Genova & Dimitrov), piano duo
- Jean-Claude Gérard, flute
- André Gertler, violin
- Carla Henius, voice
- Heinz Hennig, choral conducting
- Karl-Heinz Kämmerling, piano
- Alfred Koerppen, composition
- Ladislav Kupkovič, music theory
- Helmut Lachenmann, composition
- Diether de la Motte, music theory
- Nigel Osborne, composition
- Eiji Oue, conducting
- Sebastian Peschko, pianist, teacher of lied-accompaniment
- Felix Prohaska, conducting
- Matti Raekallio, piano
- Gudrun Schröfel, choral conducting
- Jonas Stark, piano
- Klaus Storck, cello
- Siegfried Strohbach, composition
- Raphael Thoene, composition
- Yi Fan-Chiang, piano

=== Students ===
==== Music ====
- Tokunbo Akinro, singer
- Lera Auerbach, pianist and composer
- Markus Becker, pianist
- Klaus Bernbacher conductor, event and broadcasting manager
- Elisabeth Brauß, Pianist
- Francis Buchholz, bassist
- Ronald Cavaye, pianist
- Sa Chen, pianist
- Liuben Dimitrov (Genova & Dimitrov), piano duo
- Dantes Diwiak, singer
- Jörg Duda, composer
- Monika Frimmer, singer
- Aglika Genova (Genova & Dimitrov), piano duo
- Daniel Gortler, pianist, composer
- Claire Huangci, pianist
- Kei Itoh, pianist
- Gintaras Januševičius, pianist
- Nicola Jürgensen, clarinet
- Morten Klein, saxophonist, composer
- Jan Kobow, tenor
- Giorgi Latsabidze, pianist
- Ingmar Lazar, pianist
- Georges Lentz, composer
- Igor Levit, pianist
- Li Yundi, pianist
- Michail Lifits, pianist
- Dong-Min Lim, pianist
- Colette Lorand, soprano
- Jun Märkl, conductor
- Cornelius Meister, conductor
- Kristin Merscher, pianist
- Wolfgang Meyer, clarinetist
- Nils Mönkemeyer, violist
- Sarah Nemtsov, oboist, composer
- Miku Nishimoto-Neubert, pianist
- Gustavo Núñez, bassoonist
- Gülsin Onay, pianist
- Francesco Piemontesi, pianist
- Ilya Rashkovsky, pianist
- Martin Schmeding organ
- Thomas Schmidt-Kowalski, composer
- Wolfgang Schöne, baritone
- Gudrun Schröfel choral conductor
- Hanna Schwarz, singer
- Rainer Seegers, percussionist
- Wenyu Shen, pianist
- Fumiko Shiraga, pianist
- Thea Soti, singer
- Jonas Stark, pianist
- Friedrich-Wilhelm Tebbe, conductor
- Lars Vogt, pianist
- Bernd Weikl, baritone
- Derek Woods, composer
- Ka Ling Colleen Lee, pianist
- Ching-Yun Hu, pianist

==== Acting ====
- Dietrich Adam
- Ulrike Folkerts
- Thomas Limpinsel
- Katja Riemann
- Katharina Schüttler
- Hans Werner Meyer

==== Journalism ====
- Bettina Wulff, media manager
