= List of classical pianists (recorded) =

This is a list of pianists of whom recordings survive who play (or played) classical music.

For a more inclusive list not limited to recorded pianists, see also List of classical pianists (solo pianists) and List of classical piano duos (performers) (piano duos, trios, etc.).

== A ==
- Behzod Abduraimov
- Jacques Abram
- Dag Achatz
- Joaquín Achúcarro
- Adolovni Acosta
- Daniel Adni
- Adrian Aeschbacher
- Valery Afanassiev
- Guido Agosti
- Pierre-Laurent Aimard
- Webster Aitken
- Nelly Akopian-Tamarina
- Giuseppe Albanese
- Isaac Albéniz
- Eugen d'Albert
- Charlie Albright
- Dimitri Alexeev
- Victor Aller
- Ilse von Alpenheim
- Louis Demetrius Alvanis
- Donna Amato
- Géza Anda
- Piotr Anderszewski
- Leif Ove Andsnes
- Nicholas Angelich
- Agustin Anievas
- Eteri Andjaparidze
- Conrad Ansorge
- Anton Arensky
- Martha Argerich
- Nareh Arghamanyan
- Kit Armstrong
- Yvonne Arnaud
- Claudio Arrau
- Lydia Artymiw
- Şahan Arzruni
- Stefan Askenase
- Vladimir Ashkenazy
- Winifred Atwell
- Lera Auerbach
- Håkon Austbø
- Myriam Avalos
- Yulianna Avdeeva
- Emanuel Ax

== B ==
- Sergei Babayan
- Stanley Babin
- Victor Babin
- Gina Bachauer
- Fridtjof Backer-Grøndahl
- Wilhelm Backhaus
- Paul Badura-Skoda
- Ryszard Bakst
- Dalton Baldwin
- Ernő Balogh
- Artur Balsam
- Volker Banfield
- Joseph Banowetz
- Pierre Barbizet
- Daniel Barenboim
- Simon Barere
- David Bar-Illan
- Trevor Barnard
- Rami Bar-Niv
- Béla Bartók
- Dimitri Bashkirov
- Elena Bashkirova
- Edmund Battersby
- Harold Bauer
- Paul Baumgartner
- Jean-Efflam Bavouzet
- Alessio Bax
- Mark Bebbington
- Betty Humby Beecham (Lady Beecham)
- Jozef De Beenhouwer
- Jeanne Behrend
- Elena Beckman-Shcherbina
- Giovanni Bellucci
- Nelly Ben-Or (Clynes)
- Arturo Benedetti Michelangeli
- Richard Rodney Bennett
- Boris Berezovsky
- Martin Berkofsky
- Bart Berman
- Boris Berman
- Lazar Berman
- Leonard Bernstein
- Michel Béroff
- Stephen Beus
- Sondra Bianca
- Philippe Bianconi
- Fabio Bidini
- Malcolm Bilson
- Malcolm Binns
- İdil Biret
- Tessa Birnie
- Sari Biro
- Hans Bischoff
- Stephen Bishop (see Kovacevich)
- William Black
- Easley Blackwood
- Rafał Blechacz
- Michel Block
- Fannie Bloomfield Zeisler
- Daniel Blumenthal
- Felicja Blumental
- Mary Louise Boehm
- Gergely Bogányi
- Moissaye Boguslawski
- Jorge Bolet
- Stefano Bollani
- Coenraad V. Bos
- Hélène Boschi
- Nadia Boulanger
- Hendrik Bouman
- Andreas Boyde
- Emma Boynet
- Evgeni Bozhanov
- Johannes Brahms
- Alexander Brailowsky
- Natan Brand
- Ronald Brautigam
- Alfred Brendel
- Benjamin Britten
- Yefim Bronfman
- The 5 Browns
  - Deondra
  - Desirae
  - Gregory
  - Melody
  - Ryan
- Ian Brown
- John Browning
- Bruce Brubaker
- Rudolf Buchbinder
- Sara Davis Buechner
- Richard Buhlig
- Josef Bulva
- Khatia Buniatishvili
- Stanislav Bunin
- Geoffrey Burleson
- Ammiel Bushakevitz
- Ferruccio Busoni

== C ==
- Sarah Cahill
- Matthew Cameron
- Michele Campanella
- Bruno Canino
- Claire and Antoinette Cann
- Boris Cepeda
- John Carmichael
- Roberto Carnevale
- Teresa Carreño (piano rolls only)
- Gaby Casadesus
- Jean Casadesus
- Robert Casadesus
- Gianluca Cascioli
- Ricardo Castro
- Bertrand Chamayou
- Cécile Chaminade
- Alton Chung Ming Chan
- Angelin Chang
- Abram Chasins
- Chen Pi-hsien
- Sa Chen
- Angela Cheng
- Shura Cherkassky
- Rachel Cheung
- Jan Chiapusso
- Gian Paolo Chiti
- Zlata Chochieva
- Daniel Chorzempa
- Winifred Christie
- Myung-whun Chung
- Marcel Ciampi
- Dino Ciani
- Aldo Ciccolini
- Tamara Anna Cislowska
- Richard Clayderman
- Van Cliburn
- France Clidat
- Julian Cochran
- Arnaldo Cohen
- Harriet Cohen
- Maurice Cole
- Naida Cole
- Catherine Collard
- Jean-Philippe Collard
- Finghin Collins
- Graziella Concas
- Sylvia Constantinidis
- John Contiguglia
- Richard Contiguglia
- Stephen Coombs
- Gary Cooper
- Imogen Cooper
- Joseph Cooper
- George Copeland
- Aaron Copland
- Chick Corea
- Alfred Cortot
- Romola Costantino
- Henry Cowell
- Patrick Crommelynck
- Tan Crone
- Christine Croshaw
- Jill Crossland
- Paul Crossley
- Lamar Crowson
- José Cubiles
- Clifford Curzon
- Halina Czerny-Stefańska
- Georges Cziffra

== D ==
- Michel Dalberto
- Dang Thai Son
- Jeanne-Marie Darré
- Fanny Davies
- Bella Davidovich
- Ivan Davis
- Claude Debussy
- Sylviane Deferne
- Arthur De Greef
- Cor de Groot
- Steven De Groote
- Eduardo Delgado
- Nikolai Demidenko
- Jörg Demus
- Jeremy Denk
- Anthony di Bonaventura
- Misha Dichter
- Louis Diémer
- Andrei Diev
- Shani Diluka
- Liuben Dimitrov
- Simone Dinnerstein
- Paul Doguereau
- Ernő Dohnányi
- Joanna Domańska
- Peter Donohoe
- Sergei Dorensky
- Ania Dorfmann
- Marylene Dosse
- Barry Douglas
- Danny Driver
- Zbigniew Drzewiecki
- Florence Kirsch Du Brul
- François-René Duchâble
- François Dumont
- Duo Tal & Groethuysen

== E ==
- Akiko Ebi
- Severin von Eckardstein
- Nicolas Economou
- Bracha Eden
- Richard Egarr
- Pavel Egorov
- Youri Egorov
- Severin Eisenberger
- Detlev Eisinger
- Jan Ekier
- Abdel Rahman El Bacha
- Edson Elias
- Emre Elivar
- Michael Endres
- Per Enflo
- Karl Engel
- Brigitte Engerer
- Philippe Entremont
- Richard Epstein
- Christoph Eschenbach
- Morton Estrin
- Róża Etkin-Moszkowska
- Lindley Evans

== F ==
- Mikhaïl Faerman
- Joel Fan
- Edith Farnadi
- Richard Farrell
- José Feghali
- Alan Feinberg
- Samuil Feinberg
- Till Fellner
- Vladimir Feltsman
- Gordon Fergus-Thompson
- Arthur Ferrante
- Jacques Février
- Janina Fialkowska
- Margaret Fingerhut
- Sergio Fiorentino
- Rudolf Firkušný
- Annie Fischer
- Caroline Fischer
- Edwin Fischer
- Norma Fisher
- Philip Edward Fisher
- Leon Fleisher
- Yakov Flier
- Ingrid Fliter
- Andor Földes
- Bengt Forsberg
- Lukas Foss
- Philip Fowke
- Fou Ts'ong
- Malcolm Frager
- Homero Francesch
- Samson François
- Claude Frank
- Peter Frankl
- Justus Frantz
- David Fray
- Nelson Freire
- Etelka Freund
- Carl Friedberg
- Arthur Friedheim
- Ignaz Friedman
- Benjamin Frith
- Herbert Fryer
- Kotaro Fukuma
- David Fung
- Margarita Fyodorova

== G ==
- Gábor Gabos
- Ossip Gabrilowitsch
- Irwin Gage
- Neil Galanter
- Rudolph Ganz
- Mark Gasser
- Ivana Gavrić
- Andrei Gavrilov
- Alexander Gavrylyuk
- Bruno Leonardo Gelber
- Kemal Gekić
- Aglika Genova
- Valentin Gheorghiu
- Lorenzo Ghielmi
- Alexander Ghindin
- Jack Gibbons
- Walter Gieseking
- Emil Gilels
- Rhondda Gillespie
- Boris Giltburg
- Jakob Gimpel
- Håvard Gimse
- Stéphane Ginsburgh
- Grigory Ginzburg
- Katrine Gislinge
- Frank Glazer
- Bernd Glemser
- Leopold Godowsky
- Aleksandr Goldenweiser
- Robert Goldsand
- Alexis Golovin
- David Golub
- Richard Goode
- Isador Goodman
- Judith Gordon
- Vera Gornostayeva
- Sascha Gorodnitzki
- Daniel Gortler
- Ralf Gothóni
- Glenn Gould
- Anna Gourari
- Enrique Graf
- Gary Graffman
- Percy Grainger
- Carlo Grante
- Arthur Greene
- David Greilsammer
- Antony Grey
- Jeffrey Grice
- Edvard Grieg
- Dan Grigore
- Hélène Grimaud
- Maria Grinberg
- Bonnie Gritton
- Andreas Groethuysen
- Benjamin Grosvenor
- Alfred Grünfeld
- Friedrich Gulda
- Youra Guller
- Horacio Gutiérrez
- László Gyimesi
- Ádám György

== H ==
- Monique Haas
- Werner Haas
- Ingrid Haebler
- Andreas Haefliger
- Reynaldo Hahn
- Adolph Hallis
- Mark Hambourg
- Leonid Hambro
- Marc-André Hamelin
- Ambre Hammond
- Yoonjung Han
- Adam Harasiewicz
- Wolf Harden
- Michael Kieran Harvey
- Clara Haskil
- Joyce Hatto
- Walter Hautzig
- Endre Hegedűs
- Inna Heifetz
- Eero Heinonen
- Claude Helffer
- David Helfgott
- Gerard Hengeveld
- Dennis Hennig
- Myra Hess
- Barbara Hesse-Bukowska
- Angela Hewitt
- Peter Hill
- Robert Hill
- Eric Himy
- Christopher Hinterhuber
- Ian Hobson
- Josef Hofmann
- Leonard Hokanson
- Vladimir Horowitz
- Mieczysław Horszowski
- Andrej Hoteev
- Stephen Hough
- Michael Houstoun
- Alan Hovhaness
- Leslie Howard
- Philip Howard
- Roy Howat
- Fei-Ping Hsu
- Helen Huang
- Jean Hubeau
- Engelbert Humperdinck
- Bruce Hungerford
- Frank Hutchens

== I ==
- Stanislav Igolinsky
- Valentina Igoshina
- Konstantin Igumnov
- Ivan Ilić
- Jos Van Immerseel
- Eugen Indjic
- Stanislav Ioudenitch
- Clelia Iruzun
- Yoram Ish-Hurwitz
- Eugene Istomin
- Amparo Iturbi
- José Iturbi
- Christian Ivaldi
- Andrei Ivanovitch

== J ==
- Peter Jablonski
- Paul Jacobs
- Ahmad Jamal
- Jenő Jandó
- Byron Janis
- Tasso Janopoulo
- Rudolf Jansen
- Gintaras Januševičius
- Dina Joffe
- Jovianney Emmanuel Cruz
- Grant Johannesen
- Gunnar Johansen
- Graham Johnson
- Henry Jolles
- Maryla Jonas
- Martin Jones
- Bradley Joseph
- Geneviève Joy-Dutilleux
- Eileen Joyce
- Terence Judd

== K ==
- Ilona Kabos
- Jeffrey Kahane
- Percy Kahn
- Joseph Kalichstein
- Gilbert Kalish
- Valentina Kameníková
- Hans Kann
- Isata Kanneh-Mason
- William Kapell
- Richard Kapp
- Danae Kara
- Natalia Karp
- Yakov Kasman
- Andrey Kasparov
- Julius Katchen
- Peter Katin
- Cyprien Katsaris
- Amir Katz
- Martin Katz
- Mindru Katz
- Klaus Kaufmann
- Constance Keene
- Rudolf Kehrer
- Freddy Kempf
- Wilhelm Kempff
- Kevin Kenner
- Louis Kentner
- Olga Kern
- Rina Kharrasova
- Stanislav Khegai
- Frederick B. Kiddle
- Edward Kilenyi
- Angela Jia Kim
- Benjamin Kim
- Paul Kim
- Izumi Kimura
- Gary Kirkpatrick
- John Kirkpatrick
- Evgeny Kissin
- Anatole Kitain
- Margaret Kitchin
- Ivan Klánský
- Dmitri Klebanov
- Elisabeth Klein
- Jacques Klein
- Walter Klien
- Eva Knardahl
- Alexander Kobrin
- Tobias Koch
- Zoltán Kocsis
- Raoul Koczalski
- Mari Kodama
- Alan Kogosowski
- Pavel Kolesnikov
- Lubka Kolessa
- Alfons Kontarsky
- Aloys Kontarsky
- Yu Kosuge
- Giorgio Koukl
- Stephen Kovacevich
- Denis Kozhukhin
- Vladimir Krainev
- Boris Krajný
- Lili Kraus
- Anna Kravtchenko
- Leonid Kreutzer
- Vladimir Krpan
- Antonín Kubálek
- Anton Kuerti
- Elena Kuschnerova
- Taeko Kuwata
- Leonid Kuzmin
- Radoslav Kvapil
- Rena Kyriakou

== L ==
- Katia Labèque
- Marielle Labèque
- Monique de La Bruchollerie
- Frank La Forge
- Juhani Lagerspetz
- Frederic Lamond
- Geoffrey Lancaster
- Walter Landauer
- Wanda Landowska
- Piers Lane
- Lang Lang
- Milan Langer
- Cosimo Damiano Lanza
- André Laplante
- Adelina de Lara
- Ruth Laredo
- Alicia de Larrocha
- Ervin László
- Jacob Lateiner
- Risto Lauriala
- George-Emmanuel Lazaridis
- Dejan Lazić
- Igor Lazko
- Philip Ledger
- Colleen Lee
- Lee Kum-Sing
- Amy Lee
- Noël Lee
- Yvonne Lefébure
- Claire-Marie Le Guay
- Kurt Leimer
- Ralph Leopold
- Christian Leotta
- Simon Lepper
- Theodor Leschetizky
- Ray Lev
- Eric Le Van
- Oscar Levant
- Beth Levin
- Robert Levin Norwegian pianist
- Robert Levin American pianist
- James Levine
- Igor Levit
- Mischa Levitzki
- Daniel Levy
- Ernst Levy
- Raymond Lewenthal
- Paul Lewis
- Josef Lhévinne
- Rosina Lhévinne
- George Li
- Ming-Qiang Li
- Yundi Li
- Liberace
- Francesco Libetta
- Cecile Licad
- John Lill
- Dong-Hyek Lim
- Dong-Min Lim
- Yunchan Lim
- Arthur Moreira Lima
- Jenny Lin
- Dinu Lipatti
- Jan Lisiecki
- Valentina Lisitsa
- James Lisney
- Eugene List
- Andrew Litton
- Peter Lockwood
- Arthur Loesser
- Nicolai Lomov
- Kathleen Long
- Marguerite Long
- Thomas Lorango
- Roger Lord
- Wolfram Lorenzen
- Yvonne Loriod
- Louis Lortie
- Iris Loveridge
- Jerome Lowenthal
- Alexei Lubimov
- Nikolai Lugansky
- Jean-Marc Luisada
- Radu Lupu
- Moura Lympany
- Charles Lynch
- Clive Lythgoe

== M ==
- Marcel Maas
- Frederik Magle
- Richard Markham
- Alan Marks
- Edwin McArthur
- Stephanie McCallum
- Leon McCawley
- Joanna MacGregor
- Murray McLachlan
- Geoffrey Douglas Madge
- Aleksandar Madžar
- Nikita Magaloff
- Gustav Mahler (piano rolls only; see discussion page)
- Petronel Malan
- Yevgeny Malinin
- Witold Małcużyński
- Plamena Mangova
- Wolfgang Manz
- Rosario Marciano
- Adele Marcus
- Israela Margalit
- Iren Marik
- Ozan Marsh
- Oleg Marshev
- Jean Martin
- Philip Martin
- Malcolm Martineau
- João Carlos Martins
- Jean-Pierre Marty
- Draga Matkovic
- Denis Matsuev
- Yuki Matsuzawa
- František Maxián
- Lincoln Mayorga
- Nikolai Medtner
- Alexander Melnikov
- Hephzibah Menuhin
- Yaltah Menuhin
- Yolanda Mero
- Frank Merrick
- Janne Mertanen
- Victor Merzhanov
- Noel Mewton-Wood
- Marcelle Meyer
- Stefano Miceli
- Aleksander Michałowski
- Arturo Benedetti Michelangeli
- Miloš Mihajlović
- Hamish Milne
- Vladimir Mischouk
- Yoko Misumi
- Gertrude Lightstone Mittelmann
- Evgeny Mogilevsky
- Benno Moiseiwitsch
- Gabriela Montero
- Sergio Monteiro
- Gerald Moore
- Ivan Moravec
- Leszek Możdżer
- Ian Munro
- Mieczysław Munz
- Roger Muraro
- William Murdoch
- Olli Mustonen

== N ==
- William Grant Naboré
- Marina Nadiradze
- Jon Nakamatsu
- Hiroko Nakamura
- Alexei Nasedkin
- Soheil Nasseri
- Martha Naset
- Yves Nat
- Lev Natochenny
- Eldar Nebolsin
- Anton Nel
- Pascal Nemirovski
- Heinrich Neuhaus
- Stanislav Neuhaus
- Anthony Newman
- Elly Ney
- Reid N. Nibley
- Francesco Nicolosi
- Stanislas Niedzielski
- Mitja Nikisch
- Tatiana Nikolayeva
- Andrei Nikolsky
- Minoru Nojima
- David Owen Norris
- Eunice Norton
- Guiomar Novaes
- Marie Novello
- Theodosia Ntokou
- Ruth Nye
- Ervin Nyiregyházi

== O ==
- Lev Oborin
- John O'Conor
- Noriko Ogawa
- John Ogdon
- Garrick Ohlsson
- Max Olding
- Janusz Olejniczak
- Gülsin Onay
- Ferhan Önder
- Ferzan Önder
- Bart van Oort
- Ursula Oppens
- Gerhard Oppitz
- Christopher O'Riley
- Míceál O'Rourke
- Lambert Orkis
- Leo Ornstein
- Rafael Orozco
- Cristina Ortiz
- Steven Osborne
- Alexander Osminin
- Alice Sara Ott
- Cécile Ousset
- Vladimir Ovchinnikov

== P ==
- Ian Pace
- Vladimir de Pachmann
- Ignacy Jan Paderewski
- Pamela Page
- Kun-Woo Paik
- Piotr Paleczny
- Josef Páleníček
- Jon Kimura Parker
- Geoffrey Parsons
- Natalya Pasichnyk
- Güher Pekinel
- Süher Pekinel
- Leonard Pennario
- Murray Perahia
- Neal Peres Da Costa
- Alfredo Perl
- Vlado Perlemuter
- Vincent Persichetti
- Egon Petri
- Nikolai Petrov
- Christina Petrowska-Quilico
- Isidor Philipp
- Edith Picht-Axenfeld
- Andrzej Pikul
- Cecilia Pillado
- Maria João Pires
- Artur Pizarro
- Francis Planté
- Mikhail Pletnev
- Jonathan Plowright
- Ivo Pogorelić
- Daniel Pollack
- Maurizio Pollini
- Jean-Bernard Pommier
- Antonio Pompa-Baldi
- Michael Ponti
- Roland Pöntinen
- Paul Posnak
- Viktoria Postnikova
- Harrison Potter
- Leff Pouishnoff
- Francis Poulenc
- Jonathan Powell
- Awadagin Pratt
- Menahem Pressler
- André Previn
- Vassily Primakov
- Paul Procopolis - a pseudonym
- Sergei Prokofiev
- Roland Pröll
- Roberto Prosseda
- Svetla Protich
- Dana Protopopescu
- Raoul Pugno

== Q ==
- Anne Queffélec

== R ==
- Alexander Raab
- Sergei Rachmaninoff
- Karol Radziwonowicz
- Matti Raekallio
- Thomas Rajna
- Beatrice Rana
- Dezső Ránki
- Rein Rannap
- Ilya Rashkovsky
- Siegfried Rapp
- Michael Raucheisen
- Maurice Ravel
- Marjan Rawicz
- Alexander Raytchev
- Walter Rehberg
- Aribert Reimann
- Paolo Restani
- Lívia Rév
- Alberto Reyes
- Sviatoslav Richter
- Hans Richter-Haaser
- Robert Riefling
- Joshua Rifkin
- Bernard Ringeissen
- Édouard Risler
- André Ristic
- Bernard Roberts
- Santiago Rodriguez,
- Pascal Rogé
- Michael Roll
- Helmut Roloff
- Aleksandra Romanić
- Landon Ronald
- Martin Roscoe
- Jerome Rose
- Charles Rosen
- Carol Rosenberger
- Moriz Rosenthal
- Mstislav Rostropovich
- Nicholas Roth
- Jacques Rouvier
- Gennady Rozhdestvensky
- Mūza Rubackytė
- Arthur Rubinstein
- Mikhail Rudy
- Antonio Ruiz-Pipò
- Walter Rummel
- Frederic Rzewski

== S ==
- Geoffrey Saba
- Vasily Safonov
- Camille Saint-Saëns
- Pnina Salzman
- Olga Samaroff
- Harold Samuel
- Esteban Sánchez Herrero
- György Sándor
- Victor Sangiorgio
- Jesús Maria Sanromá
- Wassily Sapellnikoff
- David Saperton
- Alexander Satz
- Emil von Sauer
- Jean-Marc Savelli
- Wolfgang Sawallisch
- Fazıl Say
- Ergican Saydam
- Pietro Scarpini
- Irene Scharrer
- Xaver Scharwenka
- Sergey Schepkin
- Olga Scheps
- Ann Schein Carlyss
- Valentin Schiedermair
- András Schiff
- Victor Schiøler
- Steffen Schleiermacher
- Burkard Schliessmann
- Peter Schmalfuss
- Helmut Schmidt
- E. Robert Schmitz
- Artur Schnabel
- Karl Ulrich Schnabel
- Edwin Schneider
- Andre-Michel Schub
- Alexander Scriabin
- Kathryn Selby
- Blanche Selva
- Pavel Serebryakov (Paul Serebriakov)
- Peter Serkin
- Rudolf Serkin
- Hüseyin Sermet
- Dimitris Sgouros
- Regina Shamvili
- Tatiana Shebanova
- Mordecai Shehori
- Howard Shelley
- Anatoly Sheludyakov
- Russell Sherman
- Norman Shetler
- Dmitri Shostakovich
- Naum Shtarkman
- Leonard Shure
- Valery Sigalevitch
- Antti Siirala
- Alexander Siloti
- Abbey Simon
- Leo Sirota
- Larry Sitsky
- Katia Skanavi
- Harrison Slater
- Ruth Slenczynska
- Alexander Slobodyanik
- Sigurd Slåttebrekk
- Regina Smendzianka
- Jan Smeterlin
- Leo Smit
- Cyril Smith
- Ronald Smith
- Wibi Soerjadi
- Vladimir Sofronitsky
- Grigory Sokolov
- Juan María Solare
- Solomon
- Yonty Solomon
- Georg Solti
- Wonny Song
- Gonzalo Soriano
- Pietro Spada
- Leslie Spotz
- Dubravka Tomšič Srebotnjak
- Peter Stadlen
- Martin Stadtfeld
- Andreas Staier
- Bernhard Stavenhagen
- Susan Starr
- Pavel Štěpán
- Edna Stern
- Eduard Steuermann
- Ronald Stevenson
- Kathryn Stott
- Richard Strauss
- Igor Stravinsky
- Soulima Stravinsky
- Yevgeny Sudbin
- Iyad Sughayer
- Ananda Sukarlan
- Grete Sultan
- Alexei Sultanov
- Mei-Ting Sun
- Yingdi Sun
- Rose and Ottilie Sutro
- Yevgeny Svetlanov
- Ruslan Sviridov
- Tomáš Svoboda
- Jeffrey Swann
- David Syme
- Roberto Szidon
- Balázs Szokolay
- Władysław Szpilman

== T ==
- Gabriel Tacchino
- Magda Tagliaferro
- Mark Taimanov
- Aki Takahashi
- Yūji Takahashi
- Yaara Tal
- Rosa Tamarkina
- Alexander Tamir
- Melvyn Tan
- Rüya Taner
- Sergei Tarnowsky
- André Tchaikowsky
- Simon Tedeschi
- Per Tengstrand
- Louis Teicher
- Gerardo Teissonniere
- Alfred Teltschik
- Alexandre Tharaud
- Jean-Yves Thibaudet
- François-Joël Thiollier
- Penelope Thwaites
- Germaine Thyssens-Valentin
- Ignaz Tiegerman
- Sergio Tiempo
- Michael Tilson Thomas
- Hugh Tinney
- Maria Tipo
- Martino Tirimo
- James Tocco
- Dubravka Tomsic
- Alexander Toradze
- Donald Tovey
- Geoffrey Tozer
- Max Trapp
- Daniil Trifonov
- Malcolm Troup
- Simon Trpčeski
- Valerie Tryon
- Nobuyuki Tsujii
- Anna Tsybuleva
- David Tudor
- Rosalyn Tureck
- Ronald Turini
- Anderson Tyrer

== U ==
- Zeynep Üçbaşaran
- Mitsuko Uchida
- Ayako Uehara
- Fredrik Ullén
- Imre Ungár
- Alexander Uninsky
- Rem Urasin
- Mihaela Ursuleasa

== V ==
- Arbo Valdma
- Vladimir Valjarević
- Arie Vardi
- Tamás Vásáry
- Kosti Vehanen
- Ester Vela
- Eulalia Vela
- Ilana Vered
- Matthijs Verschoor
- José Vianna da Motta
- Vladimir Viardo
- Carlo Vidusso
- Roger Vignoles
- Ricardo Viñes
- Anna Vinnitskaya
- Lev Vinocour
- Eliso Virsaladze
- Stefan Vladar
- Pancho Vladigerov
- Lev Vlassenko
- Lars Vogt
- Aleksey Volodin
- Arcadi Volodos
- Andrew von Oeyen
- Franz Vorraber
- Ralph Votapek
- Vitya Vronsky

== W ==
- Vanessa Wagner
- Bruno Walter
- Jue Wang
- Yuja Wang
- Theo Wangemann
- Andrzej Wasowski
- Ashley Wass
- Huw Watkins
- André Watts
- Janice Weber
- Beveridge Webster
- François Weigel
- Nancy Weir
- Alan Weiss
- Orion Weiss
- Alexis Weissenberg
- Ueli Wiget
- Earl Wild
- David Wilde
- Gerard Willems
- Llŷr Williams
- Malcolm Williamson
- Paul Wittgenstein
- Daniel Wnukowski
- Ernst Victor Wolff
- Eleanor Wong
- See Siang Wong
- Roger Woodward
- Bolesław Woytowicz
- Roger Wright
- Friedrich Wührer

== X ==
- Di Xiao

== Y ==
- Oxana Yablonskaya
- Marina Yakhlakova
- Vladimir Yampolsky
- Ivan Yanakov (pianist)
- Joyce Yang
- Ventsislav Yankoff
- Ramzi Yassa
- Anna Yesipova (Annette Essipova)
- Christine Yoshikawa
- Maria Yudina
- Li Yundi (see Li)

== Z ==
- Franciszek Zachara
- Christian Zacharias
- Yakov Zak
- Berenika Zakrzewski
- Irina Zaritskaya
- Carlo Zecchi
- Dieter Zechlin
- Mark Zeltser
- Mélodie Zhao
- Zhu Xiao-Mei
- Igor Zhukov
- Lilya Zilberstein
- Krystian Zimerman
- Tadeusz Żmudziński
