= Zorman =

Zorman is a surname. Notable people with the surname include:

- Itamar Zorman (born 1985), Israeli violinist
- Ivan Zorman (1885-1957), Slovene poet
- Ivo Zorman (1926-2009), Slovene writer
- Moshe Zorman (born 1952), Israeli composer
- Uroš Zorman (born 1980), Slovenian handballer
