= Restani =

Restani is a surname. Notable people with the surname include:

- Jane A. Restani (born 1948), American judge
- Kevin Restani (1951–2010), American basketball player
- Paolo Restani (born 1967), Italian classical pianist
