= David Syme (disambiguation) =

David Syme (1827–1908) was a Scottish-Australian newspaper proprietor (The Age).

David Syme may also refer to:

- David Syme (footballer) (born 1997), Scottish footballer for Cowdenbeath, formerly of Kilmarnock and Partick Thistle
- David Syme (pianist) (born 1949), American pianist
- David Syme (referee) (1944–2020), Scottish football referee
