= Itamar Zorman =

Israeli violinist (born 1985)

- איתמר זורמן
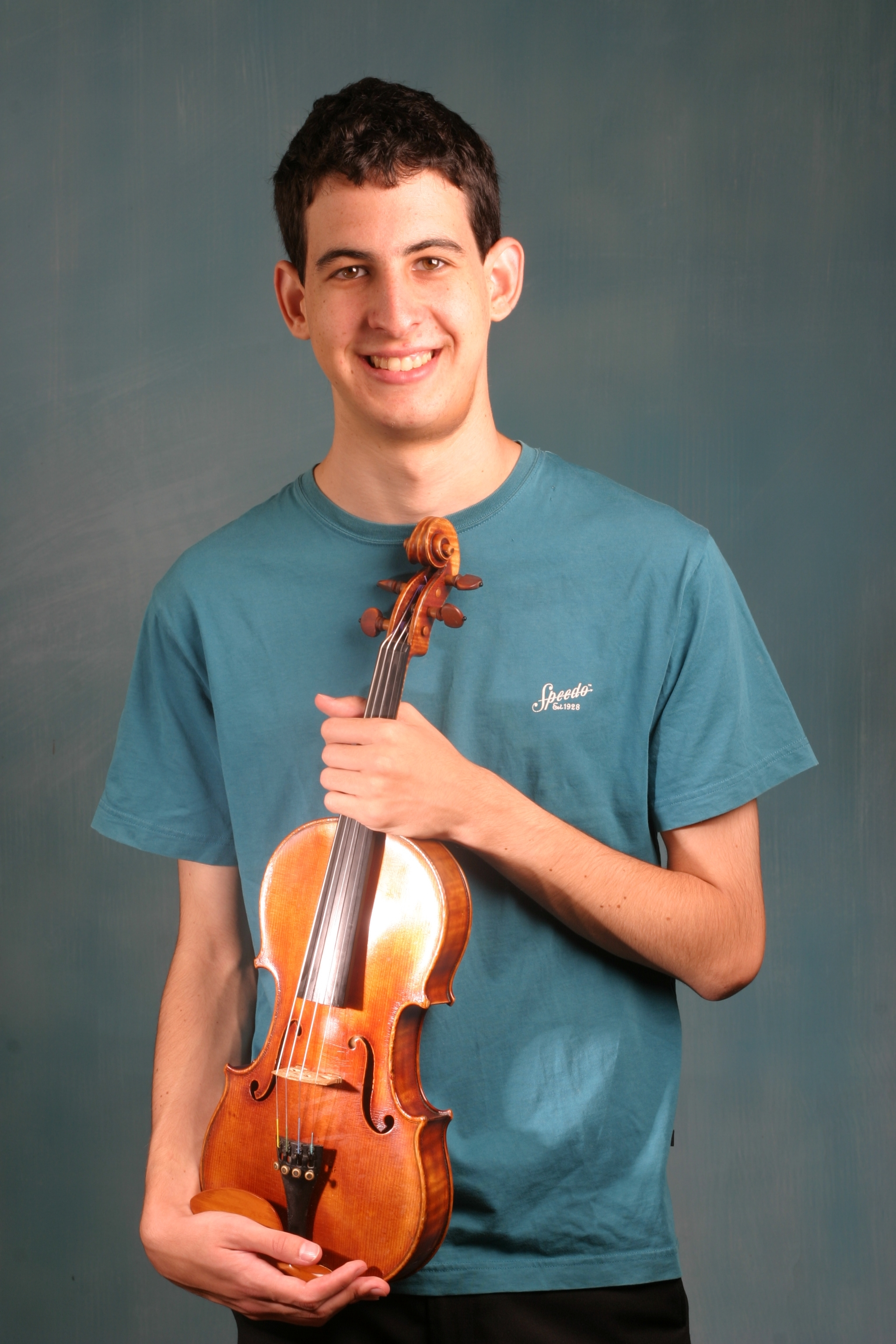
- Zorman in 2006
- Born: October 6, 1985 (age 41); Tel-Aviv, Israel
- Occupation: Violinist
- Website: https://www.itamarzorman.com

Itamar Zorman (Hebrew: איתמר זורמן; born 1985, Tel Aviv) is an Israeli concert violinist, winner of the top prize at the International Tchaikovsky Competition 2011, professor of violin at the Indiana University .

== Early life ==
Zorman was born in Tel Aviv on October 9, 1985 to a family of musicians, son of Israeli pianist Astrith Baltsan and composer Moshe Zorman. At age six, he began violin studies with Saly Bockel at the Israeli Conservatory of Music and continued with David Chen and Nava Milo, until graduating from the conservatory in 2003. He received is BM at the Jerusalem Academy of Music and Dance, with Hagai Shaham. He further studied at the Juilliard School, with such teachers as Robert Mann and Sylvia Rosenberg, and obtained his MM degree from Juilliard in 2009. He obtained a diploma in arts from the Manhattan School of Music a year later, and an artists' diploma from Juilliard in 2012. He continued his studies with Christian Tetzlaff at the Kronberg Academy, Germany.

Since his emergence with the top prize at the 2011 International Tchaikovsky Competition Zorman has performed as soloist with the Mariinsky Orchestra, Israel PHilharmonic, New World Symphony, Atlanta Symphony, American Symphony, KBS Symphony Seoul, Frankfurt Radion Symphony, German Radion PHilhamonic, Orchestre National de Toulouse, RAI National Symphony in Italy and many others. He has worked with conductors such as Zubin Mehta, Michael Tilson-Thomas, David Robertson, Valery Gergiev, James DePeist, Karina Canellakis, Yuri Bashmet and Nathalie Stuztmann.

His first solo CD recording, entitled Portrait, was released by Profil in Europe in August 2014 and in the United States in February 2015. His 2nd CD, Evocation, for BIS Records 2019 features violin works by Paul Ben-Haim, in collaboration with conductor Philippe Bach, and the BBC National Orchestra of Wales.. His 3rd CD, Violin Odyssey released in 2022 is a collection of works for violin from five continents.

Academically Zorman has held visiting positions at the Eastman School of Music, Indiana University and the McDuffie Center for Strings and is a regular faculty member at the Bowdoin International Music Festival, the Marlboro Music Festival, Keshet Eilon violin masterclasses, the Heifetz institude and the Kronberg festival. Zorman is a founding member of the Israeli Chamber Project and a member of the Lysander Piano Trio.

Currently Mr. Zorman is an Associate Professor of Music (Violin) at Indiana University’s Jacob’s School of Music.

He plays on a 1734 Guarneri del Gesù, from the collection of Yehuda Zisapel.

== Awards ==
In 2010, Zorman won first prize in the Freiburg International Violin Competition, The Julliard Concerto Competition and three Chamber Music Competitions: Fischoff National Chamber Music Competition, the Arriaga Competition and grand prize at the Coleman Chamber Music Competitio.

While still in Israel Zorman won many prizes s from the America Israel Cultural Foundation , The Jerusalem Academy of Music JAMD at the Hebrew University, and the Paul Ben-Haim Competition (1998-2006).

Zorman at the 2011 Tchaikovsky Competition

In 2011, Zorman won the top prize at the International Tchaikovsky Competition. In 2012 the Concert Artists Guild Competition , In 2013, he was awarded an Avery Fisher Career Grant in NYC and in 2014 Borletti-Buitoni Trust Award in London.
