= Philippe Giusiano =

French classical pianist (born 1973)

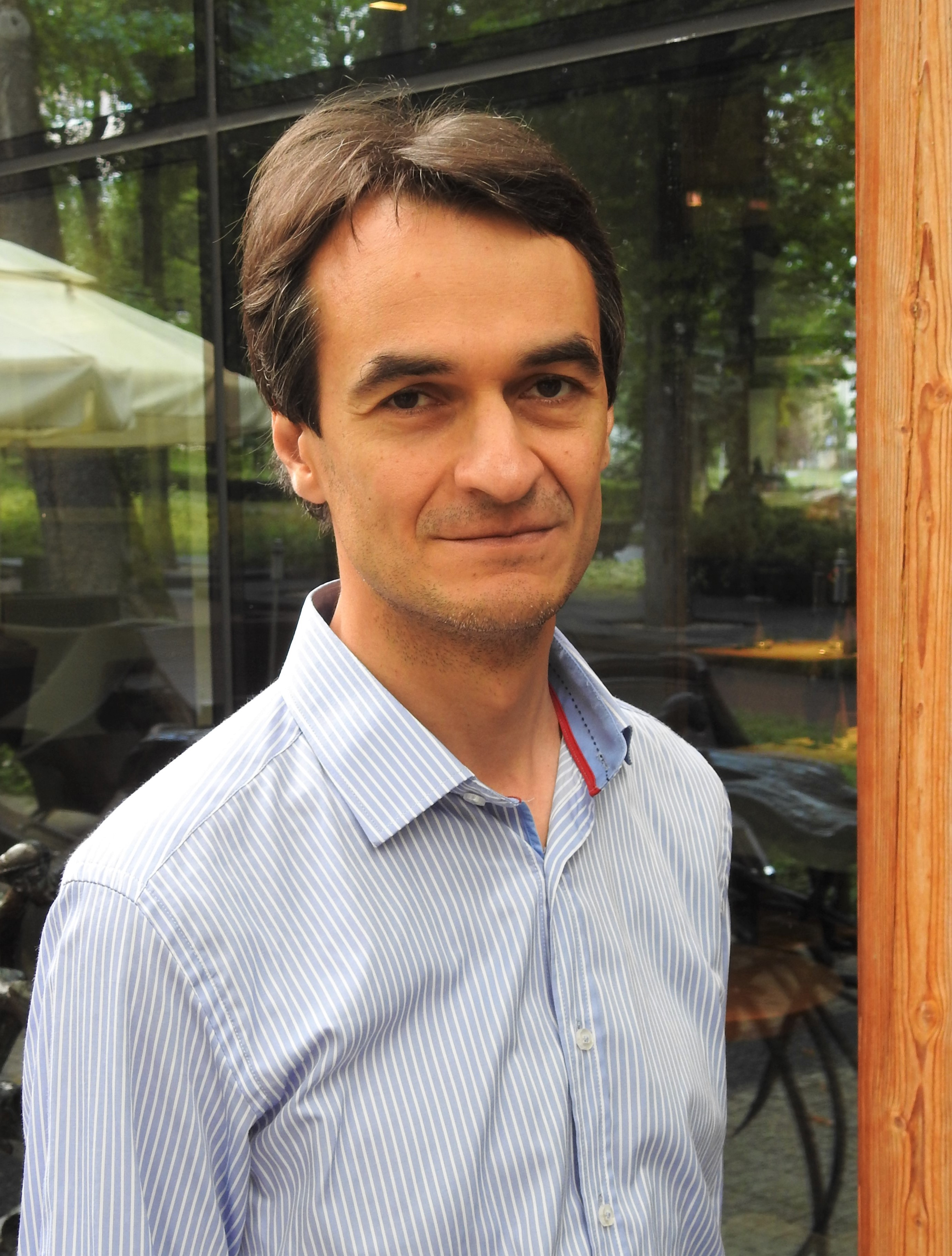
Philippe Giusiano

Philippe Giusiano (born 1973, in Marseille) is a French classical pianist.

In 1990, he took part at the XII International Chopin Piano Competition, obtaining an Honourable Mention. Five years later, Giusiano took part in the XIII competition and made it to the finals along with Alexei Sultanov and Gabriela Montero. With the 1st prize being declared void, Giusiano and Sultanov shared the 2nd prize.

Giusiano's teachers have included Odile Poisson (Conservatoire de Marseille), Pierre Barbizet (idem ), Jean-Claude Pennetier (Paris Conservatory), Jacques Rouvier (idem), Karl-Heinz Kämmerling (Universität Mozarteum Salzburg), and Jan Wijn (Conservatorium van Amsterdam).
