= XIII International Chopin Piano Competition =

The Thirteenth International Fryderyk Chopin Piano Competition
- Official poster
- Date: October 1–22, 1995
- Venue: National Philharmonic, Warsaw
- Winner: not awarded

The XIII International Chopin Piano Competition (Polish: XIII Międzynarodowy Konkurs Pianistyczny im. Fryderyka Chopina) took place in Warsaw from October 1–22, 1995. As in the previous competition five years earlier, the first prize was not awarded.

== Awards ==
The competition consisted of three stages and a final. The first prize was not awarded. Instead, Philippe Giusiano and Alexei Sultanov shared second prize. Sultanov, considered the favourite by the public, refused his award by boycotting the prize-winners' concert.

The following prizes were awarded:

Prize		Winner	
1st place, gold medalist(s)	not awarded		
2nd place, silver medalist(s)	US$20,000	Philippe Giusiano	France
2nd place, silver medalist(s)	US$20,000	Alexei Sultanov (refusal)	Uzbekistan
3rd place, bronze medalist(s)	US$15,000	Gabriela Montero	Venezuela; United States
4th	US$10,000	Rem Urasin	Russia
5th	US$6,000	Rika Miyatani	Japan
6th	US$4,000	Magdalena Lisak	Poland
HM	US$3,500	Nami Ejiri	Poland
HM	US$3,500	Nelson Goerner	Argentina
HM	US$3,500	Andrey Ponochevny	Belarus
HM	US$3,500	Katia Skanavi	Russia

For the first and only time in the history of the competition, none of the special prizes were awarded:

Special prize	Winner
Best Performance of a Concerto	not awarded
Best Performance of Mazurkas	not awarded
Best Performance of a Polonaise	not awarded

== Jury ==
- (Austria) Paul Badura-Skoda (vice-chairman)
- (Poland) Halina Czerny-Stefańska ( (gold) IV)
- (Russia) Bella Davidovich ( (gold) IV)
- (Switzerland) Jean-Jacques Eigeldinger
- (Poland) Jan Ekier (chairman)
- (Poland) Lidia Grychtołówna
- (Poland) Adam Harasiewicz ( (gold) V)
- (Poland) Barbara Hesse-Bukowska ( (silver) IV)
- (Poland) Andrzej Jasiński
- (Czech Republic) Ivan Klánský
- (Japan) Hitoshi Kobayashi
- (Canada) Lee Kum-Sing
- (France) Dominique Merlet
- (Russia) Victor Merzhanov
- (China) Ming-Qiang Li
- (Japan) Hiroko Nakamura
- (Poland) Piotr Paleczny (vice-chairman)
- (Italy) Sergio Perticaroli
- (Germany) Edith Picht-Axenfeld
- (France) Bernard Ringeissen
- (United States) Harold C. Schonberg
- (Poland) Regina Smendzianka
- (Poland) Zbigniew Sliwinski
- (Israel) Arie Vardi

== Competition Results (by rounds) ==
=== First round ===
October 2–8.

- (Italy) Irene Inzerillo
- (South Korea) (United States) Soojin Ahn
- (Japan) Mika Akiyama
- (Japan) Susumu Aoyagi
- (United States) Andrew Armstrong
- (France) Racha Arodaky
- (Hong Kong) Angela Au
- (Italy) Maurizio Baglini
- (Poland) Tomasz Bartoszek
- (Poland) Beata Bilinska
- (Hungary) Gergely Boganyi
- (Ukraine) Anna Bogolyubova
- (France) Jean-François Buvery
- (Poland) Jan Krzysztof Broja
- (Italy) Luigi Cartia
- (Taiwan) Chang Chen
- (Taiwan) (Austria) Ruei-Bin Chen
- (Taiwan) Ya-Fei Chuang
- (South Korea) Eun-Joo Chung
- (Italy) Roberto Cominati
- (Mexico) Claudia Corona Castillo
- (Italy) Michele d'Ambrosio
- (Poland) Tomasz Debowski
- (France) Jean-François Dichamp
- (Poland) Mariusz Drzewicki
- (Croatia) Natasa Dukan
- (Japan) Nami Ejiri
- (Russia) Marina Evreison
- (Japan) Masako Ezaki
- (Poland) Michal Ferber
- (Italy) Simone Ferraresi
- (Italy) Massimiliano Ferrati
- (Argentina) Ingrid Fliter
- (France) Marylin Frascone
- (Czech Republic) Eliska Gazdova
- (France) Philippe Giusiano
- (Argentina) Nelson Goerner
- (Poland) Grzegorz Gorczyca
- (Australia) Ambre Lyn Hammond
- (Japan) Ayako Higuchi
- (Russia) Ilya Itin
- (Japan) Megumi Ito
- (Russia) Maria Ivanova
- (Latvia) Karina Jermaka
- (Poland) Adam Jezierzanski
- (Czech Republic) Petr Jirikovski
- (Japan) Yoshizaku Jumei
- (Croatia) Mario Karacic
- (Japan) Masahi Katayama
- (Japan) Yuko Kawai
- (Israel) Igal Kesselman
- (South Korea) Won Kim
- (Poland) Piotr Klajn
- (United States) Tomasz Kolodziejek
- (Russia) Maria Kopylova
- (Poland) Pawel Kubica
- (Italy) Olaf John Laneri
- (Chile) Javier Lanis
- (United States) Katherine Lee
- (Taiwan) Ying-Chien Lin
- (Poland) Magdalena Lisak
- (Taiwan) Chih-Han Liu
- (Canada) Anne-Louise Turgeon
- (Poland) Joanna Laweynowicz
- (Poland) Rafal Luszczewski
- (Germany) Marlena Maciejkowicz
- (Federal Republic of Yugoslavia) Aleksandar Madžar
- (Japan) Maki Maeda
- (Federal Republic of Yugoslavia) Ratimir Martinovic
- (Finland) Janne Mertanen
- (Croatia) Zrinka Mikelic
- (Ukraine) Oleksandr Mikhailyuk
- (Japan) Misa Miyamoto
- (United States) Peter Miyamoto
- (Japan) Rika Miyatani
- (Israel) Daria Monastyrski
- (Venezuela) (United States) Gabriela Montero
- (Chile) Manuel Montero Contreras
- (Italy) Luca Monti
- (Japan) Chie Mori
- (Japan) Hideki Nagano
- (Japan) Hisako Nagayoshi
- (United States) Jon Nakamatsu
- (Vietnam) Nguen Bich Tra
- (Chile) Michio Nishihara Toro
- (Japan) Koji Oikawa
- (Japan) Masaru Okada
- (Malaysia) Nicholas Ong
- (United States) Anthony Padilla
- (South Korea) Jong-Gyung Park
- (Ukraine) Oksana Petrechenko
- (Bulgaria) Peter Petrov
- (Russia) Daria Petrova
- (Belarus) Andrey Ponochevny
- (Russia) Olga Pushetchnikova
- (Poland) Zbigniew Raubo
- (Belgium) Eliane Reyes
- (Chile) Marcela Rodríguez Hidalgo
- (Italy) Michele Rovetta
- (Poland) Katarzyna Rzeszutek
- (Japan) Kei Saotome
- (Germany) Georg Schneider
- (United Kingdom) Graham Scott
- (Belarus) Timur Sergeyenya
- (China) Yuan Sheng
- (Germany) Fumiko Shiraga
- (Russia) Katia Skanavi
- (Russia) Alex Slobodyanik
- (Poland) Piotr Slopecki
- (Poland) Anna Stempin
- (Croatia) Renata Stocko
- (Cyprus) Constantinos Stylianou
- (Japan) Shigetoshi Suematsu
- (Russia) Alexei Sultanov
- (Croatia) Ivana Švarc
- (Poland) Michal Szczepanski
- (Poland) Maciej Szyrner
- (Japan) Yuki Takao
- (Japan) Johko Takemura
- (China) Zhihua Tang
- (Slovenia) Tomaz Tobing
- (Russia) Igor Tsittser
- (Japan) Marie Tsunoda
- (Poland) Krystina Tucka
- (Russia) Rem Urasin
- (Japan) Junko Urayama
- (Russia) Mark Vainer
- (France) Frédéric Vaysse-Knitter
- (Federal Republic of Yugoslavia) Natasa Veljkovic
- (Poland) Katarzyna Vernet
- (Latvia) Sana Villerusha
- (Taiwan) Jin-Ho Weng
- (Poland) Filip Wojciechowski
- (Ukraine) Elina Yanchenko
- (Canada) Libby Yu
- (Taiwan) Lu-Hui Yu
- (Russia) Elena Zaitseva
- (Russia) Anna Zasimova
- (Poland) Pawel Zawadzki
- (China) Connie Ying Zhang
- (Russia) Ludmila Zhilenkova

=== Second round ===
October 10–13

- (Japan) Mika Akiyama
- (Japan) Susumu Aoyagi
- (United States) Andrew Armstrong
- (Italy) Maurizio Baglini
- (Poland) Tomasz Bartoszek
- (Poland) Beata Bilinska
- (Hungary) Gergely Boganyi
- (Poland) Jan Krzysztof Broja
- (Italy) Luigi Cartia
- (Italy) Roberto Cominati
- (Japan) Nami Ejiri
- (Poland) Michal Ferber
- (Italy) Massimiliano Ferrati
- (Argentina) Ingrid Fliter
- (France) Marylin Frascone
- (Czech Republic) Eliska Gazdova
- (France) Philippe Giusiano
- (Argentina) Nelson Goerner
- (Russia) Ilya Itin
- (Poland) Piotr Klajn
- (Poland) Magdalena Lisak
- (Taiwan) Chih-Han Liu
- (Japan) Rika Miyatani
- (Venezuela) (United States) Gabriela Montero
- (Japan) Chie Mori
- (Japan) Koji Oikawa
- (Belarus) Andrey Ponochevny
- (Russia) Olga Pushetchnikova
- (Poland) Zbigniew Raubo
- (Belarus) Timur Sergeyenya
- (China) Yuan Sheng
- (Russia) Katia Skanavi
- (Russia) Alexei Sultanov
- (Croatia) Ivana Švarc
- (Japan) Johko Takemura
- (Russia) Rem Urasin
- (Latvia) Sana Villerusha
- (Poland) Filip Wojciechowski
- (Canada) Libby Yu
- (Taiwan) Lu-Hui Yu
- (Poland) Pawel Zawadzki

=== Semi-finals ===
October 15 and 16

- (United States) Andrew Armstrong
- (Italy) Maurizio Baglini
- (Italy) Luigi Cartia
- (Italy) Roberto Cominati
- (Japan) Nami Ejiri
- (France) Philippe Giusiano
- (Argentina) Nelson Goerner
- (Poland) Magdalena Lisak
- (Japan) Rika Miyatani
- (Venezuela) (United States) Gabriela Montero
- (Belarus) Andrey Ponochevny
- (Russia) Katia Skanavi
- (Russia) Alexei Sultanov
- (Russia) Rem Urasin
- (Canada) Libby Yu

=== Final ===
October 18 and 19

- (France) Philippe Giusiano
- (Poland) Magdalena Lisak
- (Japan) Rika Miyatani
- (Venezuela) (United States) Gabriela Montero
- (Uzbekistan) Alexei Sultanov
- (Russia) Rem Urasin
- No overall winner.
