= Crommelynck =

Crommelynck may refer to:

- Fernand Crommelynck (1886–1970), Belgian dramatist
- Aldo Crommelynck (1931–2008), Belgian printmaker, son of Fernand
- Duo Crommelynck (1974–1994), classical piano duo of Patrick Crommelynck and Taeko Kuwata
- Eva van Crommelynck, a character in novels by David Mitchell
