= Paul Schoenfield =

American composer (1947–2024)

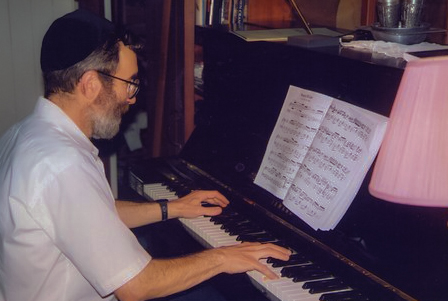
Schoenfield at the piano in 1993

Paul Schoenfield (24 January 1947 – 29 April 2024), also spelled Paul Schoenfeld or Pinchas Schoenfeld, was an American classical composer and pianist known for combining popular, folk, and classical music forms.

== Life ==
He was born in Detroit, Michigan, and died in Jerusalem, Israel.

He began to take piano lessons at the age of six, and wrote his first composition a year later. In 1966 he appeared with Leonard Bernstein on one of the New York Philharmonic Young People’s Concerts and made his Town Hall recital debut while still in his teens. Among his teachers were Julius Chajes, Ozan Marsh and Rudolf Serkin. He held a B.A. degree from Carnegie-Mellon University and a Doctor of Music Arts degree from the University of Arizona.

== Musical and educational career ==
Schoenfield was for many years an active concert pianist, performing as a soloist and with chamber groups including Music from Marlboro. With violinist Sergiu Luca he recorded the complete violin and piano works of Béla Bartók. He gave the premiere of his own piano concerto Four Parables with the Toledo Symphony in 1983. Jeffrey Kahane recorded the work in 1994 with John Nelson and the New World Symphony. Critic Raymond Tuttle called the CD: "Some of the most life-affirming new music I've heard in a long time", while he characterized Four Parables as "wild silliness in the face of existential dread."

One of Schoenfield's most frequently performed and recorded works is his piano trio Café Music, which was commissioned by the Saint Paul Chamber Orchestra (SPCO) and inspired by Schoenfeld's turn as house pianist at Murray's steakhouse in Minneapolis, Minnesota. It premiered under the title Divertimento at an SPCO chamber concert on January 25, 1987 with violinist Leslie Shank, cellist Joshua Koestenbaum, and Schoenfeld at the piano.

In 1994, the same year he was awarded the Cleveland Arts Prize, an evening of Schoenfield's pieces was presented at Reinberger Hall by violinist Lev Polyakin and other members of the Cleveland Orchestra with the composer at the piano. Cleveland Orchestra principal violist Robert Vernon gave the world premiere of Schoenfield's viola concerto in 1998, and made the premiere recording, released on Naxos Records in the same year. Andreas Boyde gave the European premiere of Four Parables in 1998 with the Dresdner Sinfoniker and Jonathan Nott, a live performance which was issued on the Athene Records label in 1999. In 2008 the work was released on Black Box Classics with Andrew Russo and the Prague Philharmonia led by JoAnn Falletta. Also on the CD Russo plays Four Souvenirs with violinist James Ehnes and the piano trio Café Music with Ehnes and cellist Edward Arron.

Schoenfield's two-act opera, The Merchant and the Pauper, was commissioned by the Opera Theatre of Saint Louis and given its premiere there in 1999. Its libretto is adapted from a tale fashioned and first told in 1809 by one of the most significant personalities in Hassidic history, philosophy, and lore- Rabbi Nachman of Bratslav (1772-1811), the founder of the Bratslaver Hassidic sect. Schoenfield's song cycle Camp Songs was commissioned by Seattle's Music of Remembrance (MOR). It was a Pulitzer Prize finalist in 2003. The song cycle Ghetto Songs, commissioned by MOR, was recorded in 2009 by Naxos. In 2010 Schoenfield's Sonata for Violin and Piano was premiered at Lincoln Center with Cho-Liang Lin, violin, and Jon Kimura Parker, piano.

Schoenfeld's introspective nature led him on an unconventional career which shifted gradually from performance to composition, moved between the U.S. and Israel, and embraced diverse interests in mathematics and the Talmud. "I've always found something lacking in just being a perpetrator of old music by dead composers," he confessed.

Schoenfield taught at the University of Toledo and the University of Akron and capped his career as an educator in 2021, retiring as Professor of Composition at the University of Michigan.

== Works ==
Piano works

- Three Pieces for piano four hands (1990)
- Taschyag for two pianos (1993)
- Peccadilloes for solo piano (1997)
- Six Improvisations on Hassidic Melodies for solo piano (2003)
- Three Intermezzi for solo piano (2004)
- Five Days from the Life of a Manic-Depressive for piano four hands (2006)

Chamber works

- Six British Folk Songs for cello and piano (1985)
- Café Music (1986) for violin, cello, and piano
- Three Country Fiddle Pieces for violin and piano (1987)
- Four Souvenirs for violin (or flute) and piano (1990)
- Six Improvisations flute and piano (1991)
- Tales from Chelm for string quartet (1991)
- Fast and Flowing for string quartet (1993)
- High Rock Ballet for amplified violin, saxophone, bass guitar, drum set, synthesizer, and piano (1993)
- Sextet for flute, clarinet, violin, cello, piano, and percussion (1993, rev. 2000)
- Sonatina for flute, clarinet, and piano (1994)
- Burlesque(also known as Beulah) for saxophone, trumpet, piano, double bass, and percussion (1995)
- Slovakian Children's Songs for flute and piano (1995)
- Sparks of Glory for narrator, violin, clarinet, cello, and piano (1995)
- Four Music Videos for violin, cello, and piano (2000)
- Cowbird for string quartet (2002)
- Partita for violin and piano (2002)
- Memoirs for string quartet (2003)
- Violin Sonata for violin and piano (2003)
- Refractions for cello, clarinet and piano (2006)
- Three Bagatelles for flute, cello, and piano (2006)
- Psychobird for piccolo and piano (2008)
- Ani Maamin for alto flute and piano (2011)
- Three Rhapsodies For piano quintet (2011)
- Carolina Reveille for violin, viola, cello, and piano (2013)
- Sonatina for Klezmer Clarinet and Piano (2013)
- 2nd Sonatina for Klezmer Clarinet and Piano (2014)
- Zemer for cello and piano (2016)
- Last Silence for flute, violin, and piano (2017)
- Gloria’s Century for flute, clarinet, French horn, violin, cello, piano, and percussion (2018)
- Eretz Hefetz for two clarinets and piano (2023)

Works for solo instrument and orchestra

- Four Parables for piano and orchestra (1983)
- Vaudeville: Concerto for Piccolo Trumpet (1988)
- Klezmer Rondos: A Concerto For Flute And Chamber Orchestra (1989)
- Viola Concerto (1998)

Vocal works

- Camp Songs for mezzo soprano, baritone, and chamber ensemble (2001)
- Ghetto Songs for mezzo soprano, baritone, and piano (2008)

Choral works

- Psalm 86 (1995)
- Four Motets (2007)
- Al Hanisim (2014)

Operas

- D’Vorah (1998)
- The Merchant and the Pauper (1999)

A partial list of his compositions is also available via the Milken Archive of Jewish Music. Paul Schoenfield scores are available from Migdal Publishing, and Opus Imprints.

== Discography (as pianist) ==
1978

Czech Music for Violin (works by Smetana, Dvořák, and Janáček) (with Sergiu Luca, violin) Nonesuch LP H-71350

1981

Béla Bartók: Complete Music for Violin and Piano (with Sergiu Luca, violin; David Shifrin, clarinet) Nonesuch 2-LP set DB-79021

1983

Alex Lubet: Two Octave Studies Minnesota Composers Forum/McKnight Disc LP MN-101

Scott Joplin: The Best of Scott Joplin (The Entertainer; The Cascades; Palm Leaf Rag; Elite Syncopations; Maple Leaf Rag; Easy Winners; Solace; Swipsey Cakewalk) Pro Arte LP SDS-613 and cassette SCS-613

1984

Stanislaw Skrowaczewski: Trio for Clarinet, Bassoon and Piano (with Joseph Longo, clarinet; John Miller, bassoon) innova LP MN-102

1987

Paul Schoenfield: Three Country Fiddle Pieces (with Robert Davidovici, violin) New World Records LP and CD NW-334

1988

Dominick Argento: Peter Quince At The Clavier (with the Dale Warland Singers; Dale Warland, cond.) Musical Heritage Society LP 912199 and CD 512199

1989

Paul Schoenfield: Café Music (with Young-Nam Kim, violin; Peter Howard, cello) innova LP, CD, and cassette MN-108

1991

Stephen Paulus: All My Pretty Ones (with soprano Ruth Jacobson) Albany CD TROY-036

Paul Schoenfield: Ufaratsta and Achat Sha’alti (with Carol Wincenc, flute) New World CD NW-80403

2001

Paul Schoenfield: British Folk Songs (with Nathaniel Rosen, cello) Albany CD TROY-494

2004

Paul Schoenfield: Burlesque and Carolina Réveille (with Lev Polyakin, violin; Robert Vernon, viola; Nathaniel Rosen cello; John Sampen, saxophone; Michael Sax, trumpet; Don Miller, percussion) innova CD 544

2008

Paul Schoenfield: British Folk Songs (with Yehudi Hanani, cello) Naxos CD 8.55980

2009

Paul Schoenfield: Camp Songs and Ghetto Songs (with Angela Niederloh, mezzo-soprano; Erich Parce and Morgan Smith, baritones; Music of Remembrance) Naxos CD 8.559641

2015

Paul Schoenfield: Al hanissim (with Essential Voices USA chorus; Judith Clurman, cond.) Dorion Sono Luminus CD DSL-92182
