= Andrey Ponochevny =

Belarusian pianist (born 1976)

Andrey Ponochevny (Belarusian: Андрэй Паначэўны; born 31 December 1976) is a Belarusian-American pianist.

== Biography ==
Ponochevny graduated from Belarusian Academy of Music where he received his bachelor's and master's degrees. He also holds his Artist Diploma from TCU, Fort Worth and SMU, Dallas, where he studied with Tamas Ungar and Joaquin Achucarro.

He was awarded the Bronze Medal at the XIII Tchaikovsky competition. Ponochevny has won First Prize at the "Tomassoni International Piano Competition in Cologne", Germany (1996) and the First Prize at the "William Kapell International Piano Competition in Maryland", USA (1998). His other competition accolades include top prizes in Prague, Warsaw (Chopin), Dublin (AXA), Moscow, Hong Kong, Riga (Latvia), Alexandria and New Orleans (Louisiana). He received an honorable mention at the XIII International Chopin Piano Competition.

Among his numerous awards, he was twice named "Outstanding Artist in China" (2009 and 2011). In his hometown of Minsk (Belarus), he was awarded the title "Minskovite of the year" in 2002.

In addition to his concert schedule, Mr.Ponochevny also teaches piano at the University of Dallas in Irving, Texas, and at Southern Methodist University, Dallas, Texas.

Ponochevny is a Yamaha Artist.

Record of piano prizes
Year	Competition	Prize	1st prize winner
1987	(Latvia) Riga International Music Competition	1st prize	
1991	(Czech Republic) Concertino Prague, Radio Competition for Young Musicians	2nd prize	(Ukraine) Anna Kravtchenko.
1996	(Germany) Tomassoni International Piano Competition, Köln	1st prize	
1998	(United States) William Kapell International Piano Competition, Maryland	1st prize	
2002	(Russia) Tchaikovsky International Competition, Moscow	3rd prize	(Japan) Ayako Uehara.
2005	(Republic of Ireland) AXA International Piano Competition, Dublin	5th prize	(Finland) Antti Siirala.
2005	Hong Kong International Piano Competition	4th prize	(Russia) Ilya Rashkovsky.
2007	(United States) Louisiana International Piano Competition	2nd prize	(China) Dizhou Zhao
2010	(United States) New Orleans International Piano Competition	2nd prize	(Russia) Eduard Kunz
