= Duo Vela =

- Born: Eulàlia: November 11, 1970 (age 54); Ester: January 15, 1972 (age 53); Barcelona, Spain
- Genres: Classic
- Years active: 1988–present

The Duo Vela is a musical duo consisting of sisters Eulàlia Vela López (born November 11, 1970) and Ester Vela López (born January 15, 1972). The sisters are known for their classical piano performances and have recorded three albums.

== Career ==
They obtained advanced diplomas in solfeggio, piano and chamber music at the Barcelona Superior Conservatoire. Since their debut as a duo in 1988 they have performed in several towns throughout Spain, remarking their performance at the Palau de la Música Catalana, and also at the EPTA Congress for Music for two Pianos in Namur, Belgium. In the summer of 1999 they've performed Spanish music in Philippines, in the PBS Concert Hall in Cebu and in the Cervantes Institute of Manila.

== Awards ==
They have won several prizes for piano (the 5th and 6th Berga and the 27th Vilafranca Competitions, and those held at the Barcelona Superior Conservatoire), for composition (ACD in Barcelona in 1992, 93, 95 and 96) and for chamber music (10th Mostra by the Generalitat Government of Catalonia, 2nd Castellterçol Competition and 4th L'ARJAU Competition).

== Repertory ==
Their repertory ranges from baroque to contemporary music, and they have given first performances of important Spanish composers like J. Mª Mestres Quadreny; Mª R. Ribas, M. Ros, X. Boliart, D.M. González de la Rubia, Mercè Torrents, Anna Bofill, Consuelo Colomer, Delfin Colomé, F. Wort, A. Guinovart, A.O. Sabater and F. Taverna-Bech.

The sisters have been awarded grants by the Spanish Ministry of Foreign Affairs (1995, 1997), the Spanish Ministry of Culture (1995), the Luxembourg Ministry of Culture (1997) and the AIE, Interprets and Executants Association (1998, 1999 and 2000).

== Recordings ==
In 2004 they released the CD 21st Century Contemporary Music (Ars Harmònica 135).

In 2008 they released the CD Dances (Ars Harmònica 191).

In 2009 they released the CD Concierto fémina clásica'09 in support of the International Day Against Gender Violence, live recording at Centro Cultural Nicolás Salmerón, Madrid on October 28, 2009.

They have also taken part in recordings with the composer Josep Mª Mestres-Quadreny (CD by Ars Harmonica), and with the composer Mercè Torrents (CD by the Associació catalana de Compositors). They have recorded for radio with Radio Nacional-4, Radio Nacional-2, COM-Radio and Catalunya Música and for Canal 33 and BTV-Barcelona Television.

== See also ==
Classical pianists (recorded)
