= Astrith Baltsan =

Israeli musical artist (born 1956)

Astrith Baltsan אסתרית בלצן
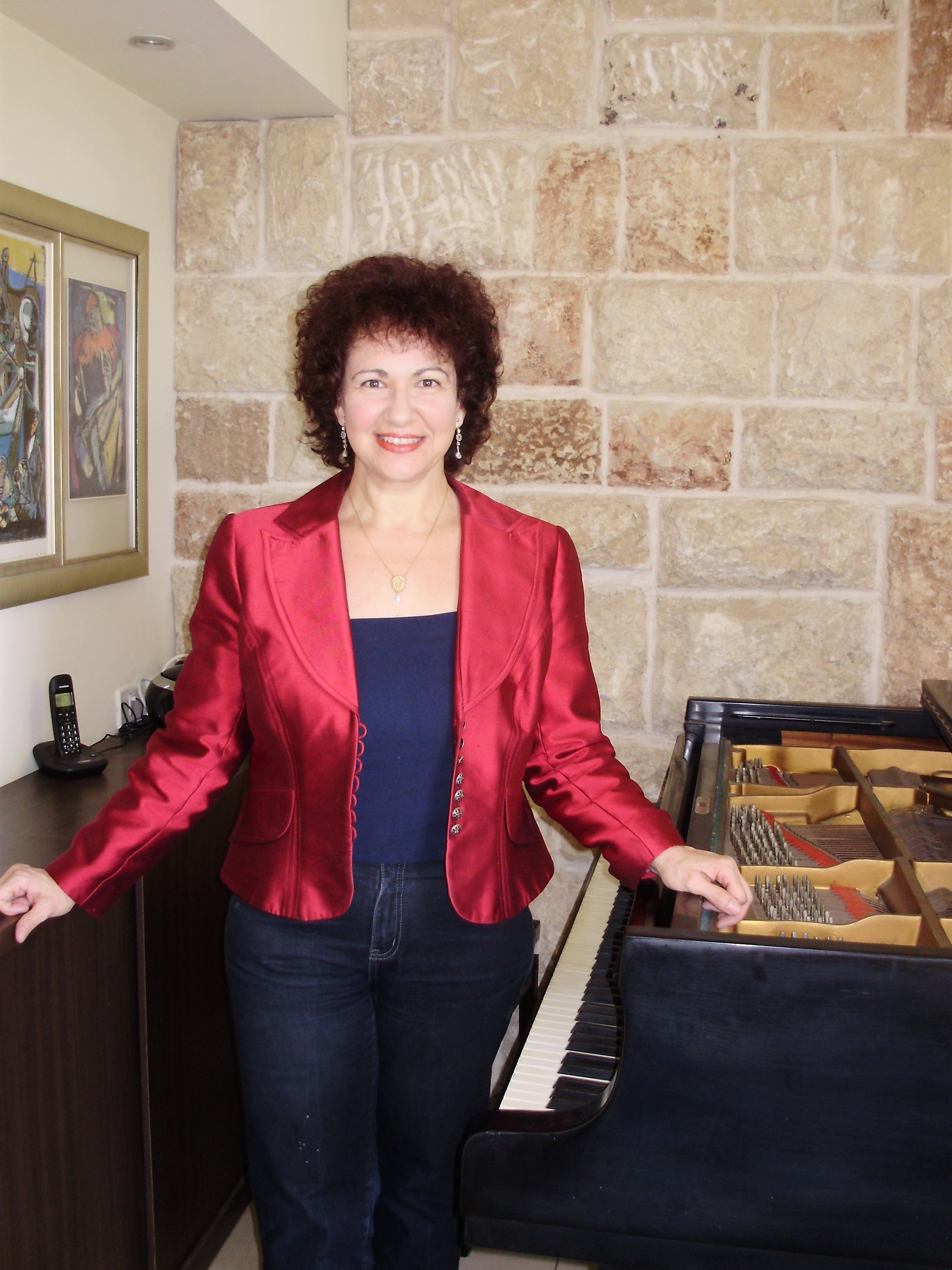
- Baltsan at the piano at home in Tel Aviv (2012)

Background information
- Born: October 24, 1956 (age 69)
- Occupations: Concert Pianist, musicologist, music director, lecturer, presenter, music educator
- Instrument: Piano

Astrith Baltsan (Hebrew: אסתרית בלצן; born 24 October 1956) is a concert pianist, winner of Israel Emmy Award 2025 and Israel Culture Prize for lifetime achievement in music 2024, known for her Beethoven interpretations and her unique concert style, mediating classical music to large audiences. Her concerts and televised series with the Israel Philharmonic ,were described as a "revolutionary multisciplinary approach to presenting classical music". She is known worldwide for her research on Israel national anthem – Hatikva.

== Early life and education ==
=== Family ===
Baltsan was born in Tel Aviv in 1956. Her mother, Dr. Rozelia Ruth Garti (1925–1999) was a pediatrician who came to Israel from Sofia, Bulgaria, in 1949. Her father Hayim Baltsan (1910–2002), a journalist and author, was the founder of ITIM (news agency) and author of the Webster's New World Hebrew Dictionary.

Baltsan is married to the composer Moshe Zorman. They have three children: Itamar, Alma and Reut. Their son, violinist Itamar Zorman was the winner of the Tchaikovsky competition in 2011.

=== Education ===
Baltsan began studying music at the age of 8. She won the America Israel Cultural Foundation scholarships and graduated with honors from Tel Aviv University with both BA and MA in piano (with Mindru Katz and Arie Vardi) and musicology. She won a scholarship for graduate studies at the Juilliard School in New York, and in 1983 she graduated as a Doctor of Musical Arts (summa cum laude) in piano from the Manhattan School of Music in New York (with Artur Balsam).

== Career and awards ==
In 1984, Baltsan won the Banff Concerto Competition in Canada, as well as the Concert Artists Guild's competition in New York City. She performed at the Norfolk Chamber Music Festival (Yale University), the Tanglewood Festival, the La Gesse Festival in France, the Tutzing Festival in Munich and the Ernen Chamber Festival in Switzerland.

Astrith Baltsan returned to Israel in 1985 to join the faculty of the Rubin Academy of Music at Tel Aviv University. She was a founder and music director of the Musica Nova Ensemble for new music, and recorded a large number of original Israeli compositions, many of them dedicated especially to her. She appeared as pianist, presenter and music director of concert series with the Israel Chamber Orchestra (1988–1996), the Israel Philharmonic Orchestra (2000–2019), the Israel Festival in Jerusalem (including performances of the complete Beethoven Sonatas in 1987) and the New Israeli Opera.

In 1990 Baltsan started to develop her series "Classics in Personal View", in which she performs classical music masterpieces accompanied with live storytelling and explanations. The program also incorporates pop, jazz and other genre segments, and includes performances by guest artists. This concert series has been the largest of its type in Israel for the last 30 years. Her combination of performance and narration is exemplified in her lecture-recital covering, among others, Beethoven's Moonlight Sonata and Debussy's Clair de Lune, different versions of which are available on YouTube (in English) and on CD (in Hebrew).

In 1996 Baltsan and her husband, Israeli composer Moshe Zorman, founded "Music Cathedra", a music college in the Enav cultural center in Tel Aviv. The Israeli Ministry of Education has approved Music Cathedra as a professional development institution.

In 2000 Baltsan started collaborating with the Israel Philharmonic Orchestra conducted by Zubin Mehta, a collaboration which continued until 2019 and featured symphonic and chamber music projects, as well as a series of TV concerts for the Israel Broadcasting Authority (Channel 1, 2003–2004). Baltsan was also music director of concert series with the Rishon Lezion Orchestra (2016 - 2018) and the Jerusalem Symphony Orchestra (2019 - 2023).

Baltsan appears in solo recitals, and as a soloist with several orchestras, in Europe, the US, Canada, Central America, Australia and South Africa. Her concerts are broadcast regularly on Kan Kol Hamusica (the classical radio channel of the Israel Public Broadcasting Corporation).

In 2024, Baltsan was awarded the Arik Einstein Prize for Lifetime Achievement by the Israeli Ministry of Culture . She was also nominated for the Israel Prize, Israel's most prestigious national prize, awarded by the Ministry of Education. In 2025 she was awarded the Emmy prize for lifetime outstanding contribution to Israel classical music scene.

=== Hatikvah research ===
In 2009, Baltsan completed her book Hatikvah – Past, Present, Future, commissioned by the Israeli Ministry of Education. The book is a 200-page long study on the origins of the Israeli anthem, and includes two CDs with rare historical recordings, various orchestrations of the anthem, and alternative anthems relevant to Jewish life in Israel and abroad.

After the book's release, Baltsan started touring in Israel with the concert "Hatikvah", based on her research. Baltsan also tours internationally with this concert series under the title of "Hatikvah – Hope Reborn". As of 2024, Baltsan has toured with Hativkah in USA, Central America, Europe, Australia and South Africa.

Awards

- 1984—first prize at Banff Concerto Competition
- 1984—The Concert Artist Guild Award, NYC
- 2001—Rosenblum Prize for the Performing Arts
- 2006—Audience's Favorite prize held by Yediot Ahronot
- 2007—Minister of Culture Prize for Music Performers
- 2008—Landau Prize held by Mifal HaPayis
- 2024 - Einstein Prize for lifetime Achievement in music.
- 2025 - Emmy Award for lifetime contribution to Israel culture.
