= Theodosia Ntokou =

Concert pianist

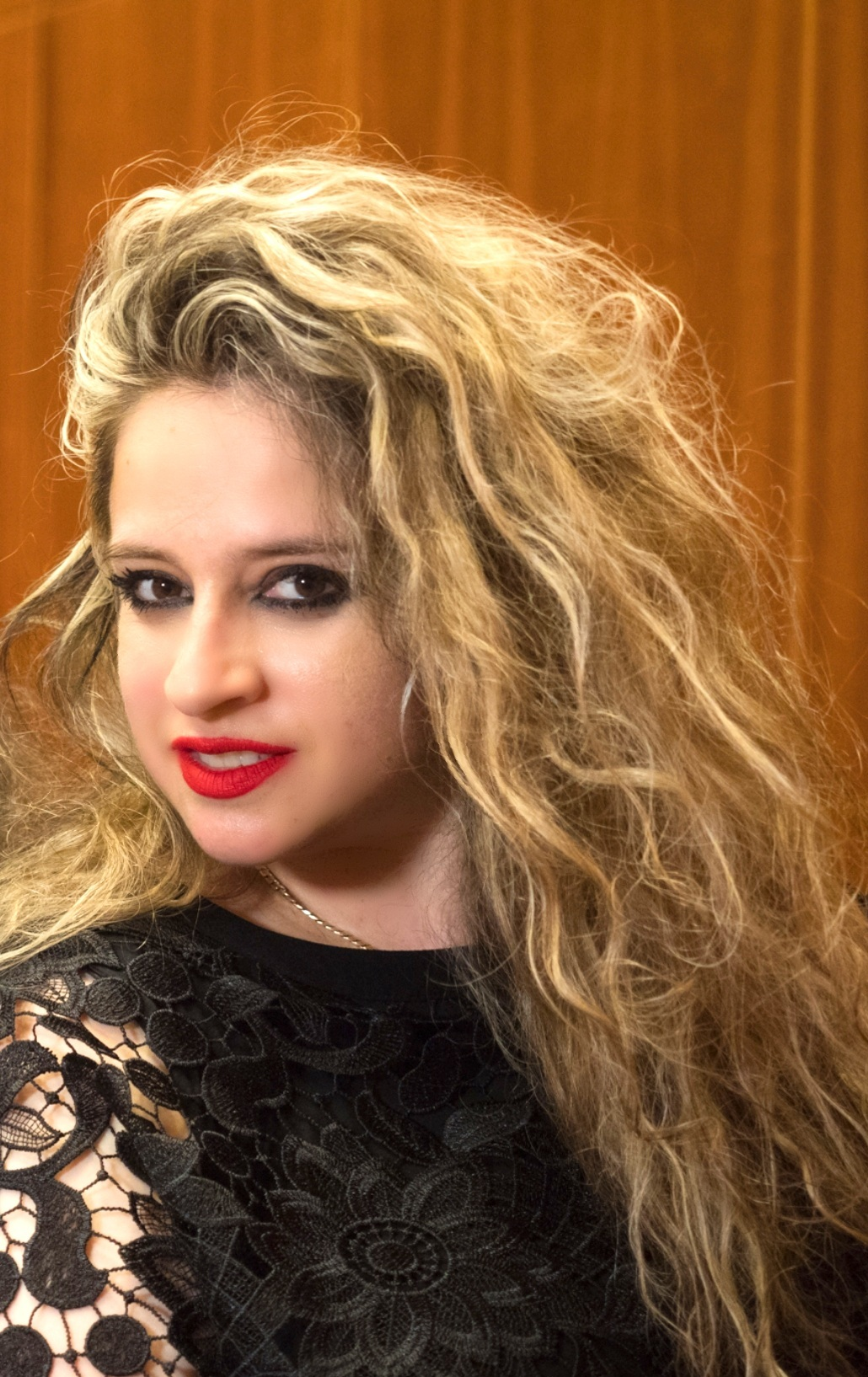
- Theodosia while recording for Warner Classics

Background information
- Born: Rhodes, Greece
- Genres: Classical Music
- Occupation: Classical pianist
- Instrument: Piano
- Label: Warner Classics
- Website: theodosia-ntokou.com

Theodosia Ntokou (Greek: Θεοδοσία Ντόκου, Rhodes Greece) is a Greek classical pianist.

== Biography ==
Theodosia Ntokou was born on the island of Rhodes to a family of music lovers. Her mother, Mary Vergoti is a school teacher, her father, Panagiotis, is the commander of the harbor of Rhodes and her younger brother George is a medical doctor.

She began to study piano at the age of twelve at the conservatory in Rhodes. After the director of the conservatory spotted her talent, Ntokou and her mother would travel 32 hours from Rhodes to Athens and back by ship for weekly one-hour lessons at the National Conservatory. Ntokou moved to Athens when she turned 16.

There, she studied for five years at the National Conservatory with Aris Garufalis, and graduated with honors.

Ntokou then continued her studies with Hungarian pianist Laszlo Simon at the Universität der Künste in Berlin and simultaneously received her Postgraduate Degree from the Franz Liszt Academy of Budapest. She then moved to the United States, where she completed her master's degree with Russian pianist Oxana Yablonskaya and went on to earn an assistantship at the University of Hartford-The Hartt School in Connecticut.

Ntokou has performed in many festivals across Europe such as the prestigious Progetto Martha Argerich, the Ravello Festival, the Athens & Epidaurus Festival, the Martha Argerich Festival, the Crans-Montana "Les Sommets du Classique", the Armonie d'Arte Festival, the Busko Zdrój Festival in Poland, the Rolandseck Festival in Germany, the Sagra Musicale Malatestiana, the Festival Pianistico Brescia e Bergamo and the Carloforte Music Festival in Italy and has collaborated with many orchestras such as the Royal Philharmonic Orchestra, the Amsterdam Sinfonietta, the Berliner Symphoniker, the Athens State Orchestra and the Berliner Camerata, the Youth Orchestra of Bahia among others.

Theodosia has been performing extensively in many prestigious halls through Asia, Europe and the United States.

An important step in her life was her meeting in 2009 with the legendary pianist Martha Argerich, who after an audition, became her mentor, inspiration and has led her to new paths in her career. Since then, Theodosia has been under her guidance.

== The China Music Series ==
Ntokou has made reality one of her wishes, as in November 2021, she will realize her new annual Classical Music Festival called China Music Series (Chinese: 中国南方音乐周) and will take place at the Guangzhou Opera House.

As a Founder and Artistic Director of the Series in 2020, Theodosia welcomed artists who performed at the festival such as Martha Argerich, Maxim Vengerov, Steven Isserlis, Daniel Hope and Guy Braunstein.

== Prizes and awards ==
Ntokou has received the following prizes and awards:

- 2006: Young Artists International Piano Competition - Winner
- 2007: Bradshaw & Buono International Piano Competition Winner
- 2008: Evelyn Bonnar Scholarship Award
- 2021: Opus Klassik Awards / Best Chamber Music Award - Nomination

== Discography ==
- 2009 Ludwig van Beethoven, Concerto for piano and orchestra Nr. 3, Op. 37 in C minor. Acte Préalable
- 2020: Ludwig van Beethoven, Symphony No.6 "Pastorale" arr. 4 hands by Selmar Bagge together with Martha Argerich and the Sonata Op.31 No.2 "Tempest". Warner Classics

== Reviews ==
In a review of Argerich's and Ntokou's new Beethoven album, Norman Lebrecht from Slipped Disc wrote:

   Is nothing like you've ever heard...The most musical account since...Bruno Walter, maybe[35]

and the LA Times mentioned:

   Refreshes as though the Pastorale were bathed in a crystalline mountain stream[36]

The BBC Music Magazine has praised Theodosia as:

   Dramatically poised, classically aware, emotionally supple, and refreshing[37]

== See also ==
- The China Music Series
- The China Music Series - Twitter
- The China Music Series - Instagram
- Theodosia Ntokou - Official Website
- Theodosia Ntokou - Twitter
- Theodosia Ntokou - Instagram
