= Dimitris Sgouros =

- Born: 30 August 1969 (age 57); Athens, Greece
- Genre: Classical music
- Occupation: Musician
- Instrument: Piano
- Years active: 1977–present
- Website: www.sgouros-pianist.com

Dimitris Sgouros (Greek: Δημήτρης Σγούρος; born 30 August 1969)^{[a]} is a Greek classical pianist. Sgouros is a former child prodigy and is considered a leading concert pianist. Arthur Rubinstein said his performance was "the best playing I have ever heard".

== Biography ==
Dimitris Sgouros is an Aromanian, who said "I am Vlach with a capital V", Vlach being the common name for the Aromanians in Greece. Sgouros is the son of Sotirios and Marianthi Sgouros. There was no notable record of musical talent in his family. He began playing the piano when he was six-years old and gave his first public performance a year later. At the age of eight, he entered the Athens Conservatoire, studying under Maria Herogiorgiou-Sigara. Sgouros won several competitions between 1978 and 1983, including the UNICEF competition in Bulgaria (1979), a competition in Ancona, Italy (1980), and two competitions in his home city of Athens. He was also the recipient of the 1982 Leonardo da Vinci International Award.

In 1982, at the age of 12, Sgouros made his Carnegie Hall debut. He performed Rachmaninoff's Piano Concerto No. 3 with the National Symphony Orchestra, conducted by Mstislav Rostropovich. In mid-1983, before he had turned 13, Sgouros graduated from the conservatory with a professor's diploma, teacher's diploma, first prize, and a gold medal. Sgouros continued his studies at the Royal Academy of Music of London and the University of Maryland, College Park, in the United States of America. He graduated from Royal Academy with the highest marks the institution had ever awarded. Besides his musical talents, Sgouros has undertaken postgraduate studies in mathematics at the University of Oxford.

Performances around the world have included concerts in Australia, Austria, Bulgaria, China, Cyprus, France, Germany, Hong Kong, Israel, Italy, Japan, Korea, New Zealand, Romania, Russia, South Africa, Spain, and Turkey. Sgouros has performed for the royal families of Britain, Monaco, and Sweden, and played under the baton of renowned conductors such as Herbert von Karajan, Leonard Bernstein, Emil Tabakov, Kurt Masur, and Yevgeny Svetlanov. He has recorded for various record labels, including Dino Music, M.E.I. Records and EMI. Since March 1988, three Sgouros Festivals have been instituted, in Hamburg, Ljubljana, and Singapore.

Sgouros has featured prominently in the media, having appeared on NBC's The Tonight Show Starring Johnny Carson and a television concert with Chopin's 1st Piano Concerto. He has also been profiled by Oscar-winning director François Reichenbach in a feature-length documentary film.

== See also ==
- List of classical pianists
- List of classical pianists (recorded)
- List of music prodigies

== Notes ==
a. Sgouros's name sometimes appears as Dimitrios Sgouros.
