= Yuko Kawai =

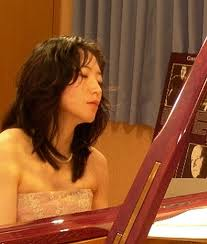
- Yuko Kawai plays Pleyel

Background information
- Born: Yuko Kawai; 20 October; Nagoya, Japan
- Genres: Classical
- Occupation: Pianist
- Instrument: Piano

Yuko Kawai (河合優子, Kawai Yūko; born in Nagoya, 20 October) is a Japanese classical pianist. She gave the world premiere of Chopin Piano Concertos in E minor Op. 11 and F minor Op. 21 in the version for one piano as published in the National Edition.

== Biography ==
=== Education ===
After graduating from Nagoya Municipal Kikuzato High School Music Department, she studied piano, organ, conducting and chamber music under Professor Atsuko Ohori, Professor Both Lehel and Yuzo Toyama at Aichi Prefectural University of Arts and Music.She studied at Chopin Music Academy in Warsaw (Fryderyk Chopin University of Music in Warsaw) and gained her diploma in 1994.

=== Relationship with Jan Ekier ===
During her postgraduate studies in Aichi, her talent was spotted by Professor Jan Ekier, during his visit to Japan. They met in Nagoya and Ekier invited her to Warsaw.

Ekier visited Japan five times. His last visit was early in spring in 1990. He gave Chopin lectures and master-classes all over Japan. In 1990 Kawai was studying at Aichi Prefectural University of Arts and Music and attended his lesson in Nagoya. She played Chopin's Sonata in B minor Op.58. After the lesson Ekier immediately told Kawai to come to Poland, to his class at Chopin Music Academy in Warsaw. During the Japan tour Ekier had lessons with over 60 pianists, mainly Chopin Competition participants in October 1990, but only Kawai was invited as his pupil. At that time Ekier told the masterclass interpreter about Kawai: "She has great potential. And she has very good hands as a pianist."

=== Chopin Competition ===
After receiving the 3rd prize at The International Chopin Piano Competition in Marienbad in July 1995, Kawai took part the XIII International Chopin Piano Competition in October 1995 in Warsaw. Although she did not receive a prize, TVP, Polish Radio, "Wiadomości Kulturalne" magazine - the media paid a great deal of attention to her. Polish Radio Program 1 (Pierwszy Program Polskiego Radia) made a 30-minute special radio report, featuring her performing and life. After the airing of the report in November 1995, suddenly Kawai received a lot of offers and did a 14-recital concert tour of Poland in February and March 1996.

== Yuko Kawai & Chopin National Edition ==
Kawai met Jan Ekier's Chopin Urtext Edition when she was a junior high school student - Wiener Urtext Edition Chopin Nocturnes. Since she came to Poland to study with Ekier in 1991, she has used Chopin National Edition. Also, in 1991 Kawai obtained Ekier's book "Introduction to the National Edition". In 2010 Kawai had her own TV programme series 'Yuko Kawai talks about Chopin National Edition' on CLASSICA JAPAN TV (vol.1-13, July–September 2010). In 2011 the programme won prestigious Japan Satellite Broadcasting Association Original Programming Award.

== Performances ==
Kawai has performed throughout Europe and Japan. She is especially known for playing Chopin, according to National Edition. Since 2001 she has given recitals of Chopin's entire output on the basis of the National Edition - 'Yuko Kawai Chopinissimo Series'.

Chopin: Piano Concerto in E minor Op.11 version for one piano by Chopin, according to National Edition

- world premiere: 17 June 2002, Chiryu, Japan
- Italy premiere: 25 September 2010, Auditorium del Massimo, Rome
- Austria premiere: 6 May 2011, Schönberg Centre, Vienna

Chopin: Piano Concerto in F minor Op.21 version for one piano by Chopin, according to National Edition

- world premiere: 11 August 2004, Chiryu, Japan
- Swiss premiere: 4 November 2017, Stadtverwaltung Konzerthalle, Murten/Morat

F.Kalkbrenner Piano Concerto No. 4 in A-flat major Op.127

- Japan premiere: 17 February 2009, Shirakawa Hall, Nagoya

Central Aichi Symphony Orchestra, Ichiro Saito, conductor

In January 2008, she gave her final performance of the complete Mozart piano sonata cycle in Nagoya and Anjo, Japan.

== Performing on period keyboard instruments ==
Kawai has a particular passion for performing Chopin on nineteenth-century period pianos. She has extensive experience performing and recording on nineteenth-century period instruments, e.g. Pleyel 1830, Pleyel 1842, Erard 1845, Pleyel 1846, Erard 1852, Erard 1855 and Pleyel 1869. In 2010 Kawai recorded Chopin's 24 Preludes Op.28 and other pieces at Hamamatsu Museum of Musical Instruments on Pleyel 1830.

== Discography ==
・CHOPIN Lento... and other works (BeArTon)

・CHOPIN Various Compositions (BeArTon)

・CHOPIN Piano Concertos single piano version (BeArTon)

・CHOPIN Ballades/Impromptus (Gakken/Platz)

・Chopinissimo I (Imagine)

・Chopinissimo II (Imagine)

・Chopinissimo III (Imagine)

・Chopinissimo IV (Imagine)

・Chopinissimo V (Imagine)

・Chopinissimo VI (Imagine)

・Chopinissimo VII (Imagine)

・Chopinissimo VIII (Imagine)
