= Ozan Marsh =

American musician (1920–1992)

Ozan Marsh (June 25, 1920 in Pasadena, California – March 15, 1992) was a celebrated concert pianist active throughout the world as well as across the United States, and a highly esteemed piano teacher. Drawing on his decades of teaching experience, he put forward a consistent approach to teaching and learning to play the piano with a special focus on the technical side. Marsh had a particular affinity for Chopin and Liszt, having devoted a period of study to the complete works of Liszt.

== History ==
Marsh began his studies with Ethel Willard Putnam, a piano teacher who specialized in working with small children. Before leaving California for New York, he studied with Richard Buhlig. At fifteen, he moved to New York to study with Dutch pianist Egon Petri, who offered Marsh full scholarship to study in Europe, and with whom he would later also work in Poland. At some point, he also coached with Sergei Rachmaninoff, Vladimir Horowitz and Leopold Godowsky.

Before World War II he studied in Europe at the American Conservatory at the Fontainebleau Schools with Robert Casadesus and Nadia Boulanger, graduating "magna cum laude." He traveled to Vienna and worked with Emil von Sauer (one of the last surviving pupils of Franz Liszt) and continued study with Egon Petri during summer sessions in Zakopane, Poland. Marsh gave his Paris and Warsaw debut (Warsaw Conservatory) in 1938 only months before the outbreak of the war. His first Town Hall New York debut was in 1939 and received fine praise from the New York Times. During WWII he served in the Navy's "Lighter than Air" dirigible squadron as well as a final post as chaplains assistant because of a disability caused by the war.

During his career, Marsh won critical acclaim in recital appearances and as soloist with many of the world’s most distinguished orchestras: among them, the New York Philharmonic, Philadelphia Orchestra, Boston Pops, Boston Symphony, San Francisco Symphony, Music Guild of Pittsburgh, San Jose Symphony, Vienna Philharmonic, Warsaw Philharmonic, St. Petersburg Philharmonic, Moscow Philharmonic Orchestra, the Royal Philharmonic, London Symphony Orchestra and the London Philharmonic Orchestras, to name a few.

Throughout his career Marsh played over 200 concert appearances with the Boston Pops Orchestra (in Boston and on nationwide concert tours), appeared a number of times with the New York Philharmonic and Baltimore Symphony Orchestra as well as gave hundreds of solo concerts throughout the United States under Columbia Artists Management, on their Community Concerts Series. During his life he had the opportunity to tour Russia (former Soviet Union 1980)at the invitation of the Soviet Government and at the invitation of one of that nations foremost senior composers Dimitri Kabalevsky. He additionally toured South Korea three times and China PRC twice, playing solo concerts as well as appearing with orchestra with the Beijing (China) Opera Orchestra.

Ozan Marsh coupled an outstanding performing career with an equally distinguished academic one. He served on the faculties of such major institutions as Indiana University, Manhattan School of Music, Butler University, St. Lawrence University, University of Arizona and the Chautauqua Institution. He participated in judging various international piano competitions including the Van Cliburn, the Franz Liszt, the National Federation of Music Clubs and many others. Some of his students include Donna Amato, Edgar Coleman, and he taught: Paul Schoenfield, Donna Amato, David Syme, Moshe Knoll, Christopher Cano, Marilyn Taggart, and his own son, Richard Ozanne. as well as others. He was also the President of the Pianist's Foundation of America, (formerly the Southwest Pianists Foundation) an organization devoted to furthering of the careers of promising young pianists. He gave a great deal of his time to the much needed project of furthering the goals of those pianists, many who have gone on to wonderful careers themselves.

Ozan Marsh has recorded for RCA, CBS (Columbia), PFA and VLR Records, the Voice of America and the Boston Symphony Transcription Library.

Marsh died at Phoenix General Hospital from pneumonia in March 1992.

== Discography ==
His discography includes:

- Hungarian Fantasy for Piano and Orchestra RCA Victrola, Arthur Fiedler and the Boston Pops Orchestra 1959
- Re-Released several times on RCA "Everything but the Beer","Three Concert Gems" CD and others.
- Dmitri Kabalevsky Concerto #2 for Piano and Orchestra, Royal Philharmonic of London, CSP Columbia Records, Collectors Edition
- Dmitri Kabalevsky Preludes and Rondo, CSP Columbia Records, Collectors Edition
- Liszt Piano Concerto #1 in Eflat, Spanish Rapsody (Busoni), Totentanz (Solo Piano) London Philharmonic Orchestra, Released on VOX Cum Laude, Allegro Records and Concert Artists Records (UK)
- Other Recordings VLR:
- Liszt B Minor Sonata, 12 Hungarian Rhapsody
- "A Century of Treasure" All Liszt Recording
- (SPF Records) Chopin 2nd Piano Sonata and Mazurkas

=== Live recordings ===
- Rachmaninoff Concerto #1 (1960)
- Rachmaninoff Concerto #2 (Un-Released)
- Kabalevsky Concerto #2 (1960)
- Liszt B Minor Sonata (1983)
- Rachmaninoff 2nd Sonata (1983)
- Scriabin 7th Sonata (1983)
- Kabalevsky Piano Concerto #2 Moscow Symphony (1980)
