= Donna Amato =

American pianist

- Born: Pittsburgh, Pennsylvania
- Occupation(s): Pianist and educator
- Notable work: 1978 Young Artists Auditions winner; recipient of the Diploma d'Onore, Guido Agosti's master class series, Siena, Italy

Donna Marie Amato (born in Pittsburgh, Pennsylvania) is an American pianist. She teaches at University of Pittsburgh.

== Life ==
Amato studied under the renowned teacher and virtuoso, Ozan Marsh throughout her early musical training. After receiving her BMA from the University of Arizona in 1983, Amato traveled to Europe to study with Louis Kentner, in London and with Gaby Casadesus, in Paris. She also received a scholarship to play for Guido Agosti's masterclass series in Siena, Italy with a Diploma d'Onore.

She studied in Mexico with Angelica Morales von Sauer, leading to concert appearances throughout Mexico as well as additional performances in many European countries, the United States, and radio broadcasts on the BBC.

== Recordings ==
Amato records mainly for the Altarus Records label.

She has been performing the music of Kaikhosru Shapurji Sorabji; in addition to giving the first ever performance of a Sorabji piano concerto (No. 5, in Utrecht, Netherlands, with Netherlands Radio Orchestra conducted by Ed Spanjaard), she premiered Sorabji's Piano Symphony No. 5 (Symphonia brevis) in New York in 2004 and, in April 2011, her recording of this work on the Altarus label was released. She has also recorded several shorter Sorabji pieces.

Amato has also been performing the works of Ethelbert Nevin, composer from her hometown of Edgeworth, Pennsylvania. She has compiled a list of Nevin's works and has performed them both in the studio and live in performances in her home town.

She has also released a CD containing various works by Carson Cooman.
