= Andreas Boyde =

German pianist

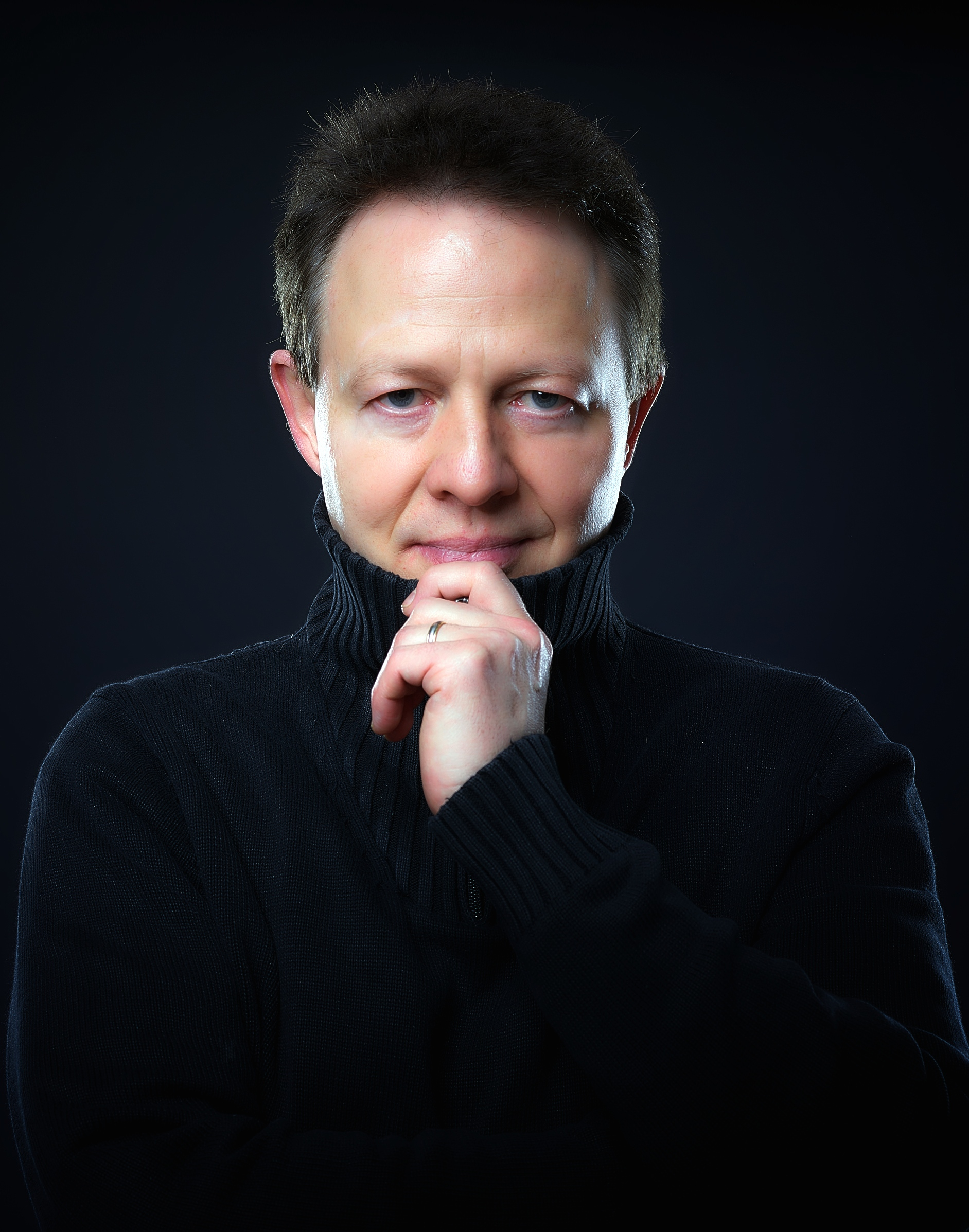
- Photo by Thomas Malik
- Born: November 13, 1967 (age 58); Oschatz, Bezirk Leipzig, East Germany
- Education: Guildhall School of Music and Drama
- Occupation: Concert Pianist

Andreas Boyde (born 13 November 1967) is a German pianist.

== Biography ==
Boyde was born in Oschatz, Bezirk Leipzig.

He has appeared in recital as well as soloist with orchestras such as the London Philharmonic Orchestra, the Sächsische Staatskapelle Dresden, the Malaysian Philharmonic Orchestra, the Prague Radio Symphony Orchestra, the Dresden Philharmonic Orchestra, the Zurich Chamber Orchestra, the Bamberger Symphoniker, the Hallé Orchestra Manchester, the Bolshoi Symphony Orchestra, the Dresdner Sinfoniker, the London Mozart Players, the Norrköping Symphony Orchestra, the Miami Symphony Orchestra, the Slovenian Philharmonic Orchestra, the Auckland Philharmonia Orchestra, the Zagreb Philharmonic Orchestra, the Belgrade Philharmonic Orchestra, the Turku Philharmonic Orchestra and the Berliner Sinfonie Orchester.

The Brandenburgisches Staatsorchester Frankfurt (Oder) appointed Andreas Boyde Artist in Residence for the season 2018/19.

The pianist completed a Brahms cycle on CD for OehmsClassics in co-production with Westdeutscher Rundfunk (German radio).

Boyde has participated in several international music festivals including the Beethovenfest Bonn, Prague Autumn and La Roque d’Anthéron Piano Festival. He enjoys a close association with German radio established by frequent broadcast recordings and productions.

The pianist gave the European première of Paul Schoenfield’s Piano Concerto Four Parables, as well as the first performance of John Pickard’s Piano Concerto, which is dedicated to him. Boyde’s reconstruction of the ‘Schubert’ Variations by Robert Schumann, now published by Hofmeister Leipzig, reveals his interest in musicological issues and was premièred in New York City.

Boyde studied with Christa Holzweißig and Amadeus Webersinke in Dresden and subsequently with James Gibb at the Guildhall School of Music and Drama in London. His mentor and promoter Malcolm Frager also proved a major influence.

In addition to his many recordings for European radio and television, Boyde’s discography includes works by Brahms, Schumann, Tchaikovsky, Dvořák, Mussorgsky, Ravel, Scriabin and Schoenfield.

== Awards ==
- 2012: Entry in the Book of Honour of his hometown Oschatz
- 2023: Gellert Arts Award

== Discography ==
- OehmsClassics:
  - Johannes Brahms: The Complete Works for Solo Piano, Vol. 1 CD OC 584
  - Johannes Brahms: The Complete Works for Solo Piano, Vol. 2 CD OC 585
  - Johannes Brahms: The Complete Works for Solo Piano, Vol. 3 CD OC 586
  - Johannes Brahms: The Complete Works for Solo Piano, Vol. 4 CD OC 743
  - Johannes Brahms: The Complete Works for Solo Piano, Vol. 5 CD OC 744
- Athene-Minerva Records:
  - Robert Schumann: Schumann Recital Düsseldorf CD ATHCD8
  - Peter I. Tchaikovsky: Piano Concerto No. 2 in G, Op. 44 CD ATHCD16
  - Modest Mussorgsky, Maurice Ravel: Pictures & Reflections CD ATHCD17
  - Antonín Dvořák, Paul Schoenfield: Piano Concertos CD ATHCD21
  - Robert Schumann, Johannes Brahms: Variations CD ATHCD23
- Dreyer Gaido:
  - Alexander Scriabin: Prométhée, Op. 60 CD 21035
