= Martha Naset =

American pianist

Martha Ruth Naset (1947 – 22 August 1994) was an American pianist.

== Biography ==
Martha Ruth Naset was born in Madison, Dane County, Wisconsin, USA. She received her Masters and Doctor of Musical Arts degrees from the University of Michigan, where she studied with György Sándor.

Naset made her European debut in 1977 playing with the Royal Concertgebouw Orchestra. That same year she made her debut recording (with the Royal Philharmonic Orchestra), which included the Rhapsody on a Theme of Paganini and other works by Sergei Rachmaninoff. She died on 22 August 1994 at Milwaukee County, Wisconsin.

== Discography ==
- Rachmaninoff: Rhapsody on a Theme of Paganini, Op. 43 - Piano Sonata No. 2 in B-flat Minor, Op. 36. Musical Heritage Society – MHS 3775
