= Rina Kharrasova =

Russian classical pianist

- Education: Ufa Secondary Special Music College; Moscow State Conservatory
- Occupation: Classical pianist

Rina Kharrasova is a Russian classical pianist. She is a graduate of the Moscow State Conservatory and has performed as a soloist with orchestras in Russia and the United States.

== Early life and education ==
Kharrasova began her piano studies at the Ufa Secondary Special Music College in Ufa, Bashkortostan. She studied with Lev Frank before continuing her education at the Moscow State Conservatory.

== Career ==
Kharrasova has performed solo and chamber repertoire in the Rachmaninoff Hall and Small Hall of the Moscow Conservatory. In 2021, she appeared as a soloist with the National Symphony Orchestra of the Republic of Bashkortostan.

By 2022, Kharrasova was based in Miami, Florida. In 2024, she served as a répétiteur for a production at the Frost School of Music.

Kharrasova has released recordings of works by Tchaikovsky and Ravel. Her interpretations have been reviewed by independent music publications, including Obscure Sound and other international online music outlets.
