= Duo Tal & Groethuysen =

Israeli and German pianist duo

The Israeli pianist Yaara Tal (Hebrew: יערה טל; born 27 February 1955, in Kfar Saba) and her German partner Andreas Groethuysen (born 2 September 1956, in Munich) are a piano duo.

Yaara Tal studied with Ilona Vincze and Arie Vardi before going to Germany where she finished her studies with Hugo Steurer and Ludwig Hoffmann. Andreas Groethuysen, son of Herbert Groethuysen, studied at the University of Music and Theatre Munich with Ludwig Hoffmann and in London with Peter Feuchtwanger.

Since 1985 they have been performing worldwide as piano duo and have appeared at musical centers and renowned festivals.

Extensive CD recording makes up an important part of their career: the Duo has released recordings of four-hand piano music not only with central works of the repertoire but also introducing less familiar names to a wide audience.

For their recordings the duo received numerous prizes and honours, like the "Preis der Deutschen Schallplattenkritik", the Echo prize of the German Phono Academy and the "Cannes Classical Award". The recordings have been praised for their programmatic ingenuity as well as their pianistic transparency and the brightness of the duo's interpretations.

== Discography ==
- J.S. Bach – Transkriptionen, Sony Classical 2024
- Franz Xaver Mozart, Frédéric Chopin – Polonaise, Yaara Tal 2017
- Claude Debussy, Richard Strauss – COLORS, Tal & Groethuysen 2017
- The Art of Tal & Groethuysen BOX – 10 CDs 2016
- Claude Debussy, Reynaldo Hahn – 1915 2015
- Joseph Haydn – Seven Last Words, Yaara Tal 2014
- Gioachino Rossini – Petite Messe Solennelle, Duo Tal & Groethuysen 2014
- Mozart & Czerny – Concertos for two Pianists and Orchestra, Duo Tal & Groethuysen 2014
- Richard Wagner – Götterdämmerung, Duo Tal & Groethuysen 2013
- DIE ZEIT – Genuss-Edition Klavier [Box-Set], Duo Tal & Groethuysen 2012
- Vaughan Williams – Concerto for Two Pianos & Orchestra, Duo Tal & Groethuysen 2012 – Echo-Preis der Deutschen Phono Akademie 2013
- Romantic Piano Music – for Four Hands [Box-Set], Duo Tal & Groethuysen Juni 2012
- Antonín Dvořák – Slawische Tänze op. 46, op. 72, Duo Tal & Groethuysen 2011
- Brahms – Klavierkonzerte Nr. 1, Schubert – 20 Ländler, Arranged for Piano 4 Hands by Brahms, Duo Tal & Groethuysen 2011
- Francis Poulenc – Concerto, Duo Tal & Groethuysen 2010
- Johann Sebastian Bach – Goldberg-Variationen: Fassung für zwei Klaviere von Joseph Rheinberger und Max Reger 2009
- Mendelssohn for 4 Hands – Octet Op. 20 & Symphony No. 1 Op. 11, Duo Tal & Groethuysen 2009
- Johannes Brahms, Reinhard Febel, Max Reger – Choral préludes – Preis der Deutschen Schallplatten Kritik 2008
- Wolfgang Amadeus Mozart – Sämtliche Werke für 2 Pianisten (3 Vol.)- Echo-Preis der Deutschen Phono Akademie 2005 und 2007
- Max Reger – Suite Op. 16 / Six Pieces Op. 94 – Preis der Deutschen Schallplatten Kritik 2004
- Robert Schumann, Johannes Brahms – Inspiration & Adoration – Werke für Klavier zu 4 Händen 2003
- Children's Corner – Vierhändige Klavierwerke von Georges Bizet, Jean Françaix, Ottorino Respighi, Walter Gieseking, Joseph Dichler 2002 – Preis der Deutschen Schallplatten Kritik 2002
- Charles Koechlin – Werke für Klavier zu 4 Händen – Echo-Preis der Deutschen Phono Akademie 2001
- Richard Wagner – Transkriptionen für Klavier zu vier Händen 1997
- Franz Schubert – Sämtliche Werke für Klavier zu vier Händen (7 Vol.) 1994 – Echo-Preis der Deutschen Phono Akademie 1997 – Cannes Classical Award 1998
- Théodore Gouvy 1994 – Werke für Klavier zu 4 Händen – Preis der Deutschen Schallplatten Kritik 1994
- Johannes Brahms – Ungarische Tänze, Walzer 1992
- Felix Mendelssohn Bartholdy – Klaviermusik zu 4 Händen 1992 – Preis der Deutschen Schallplatten Kritik 1993
- Max Reger – Klaviermusik vierhändig 1992 – Preis der Deutschen Schallplatten Kritik 1992
- Antonín Dvořák, Anton Rubinstein, Sergej Rachmaninoff 1992 – Werke für Klavier zu 4 Händen 1992
- Carl Czerny – Werke für Klavier zu 4 Händen 1991 – Preis der Deutschen Schallplatten Kritik 1992
- Johann Nepomuk Hummel – Werke für Klavier zu 4 Händen – Label: Koch/Schwann 1988
