= Katia Skanavi =

Russian pianist

Katia Skanavi (born in Moscow, 1971) is a Russian pianist. Granddaughter of the Russian film director Aleksandr Zarkhi.

Skanavi started a concert career after being awarded the XXII Long-Thibaud Competition's 3rd prize at 18. In 1994 she won Athens' Maria Callas Grand Prize. In 1995, she received an honorable mention at the XIII International Chopin Piano Competition.
