= Mordecai Shehori =

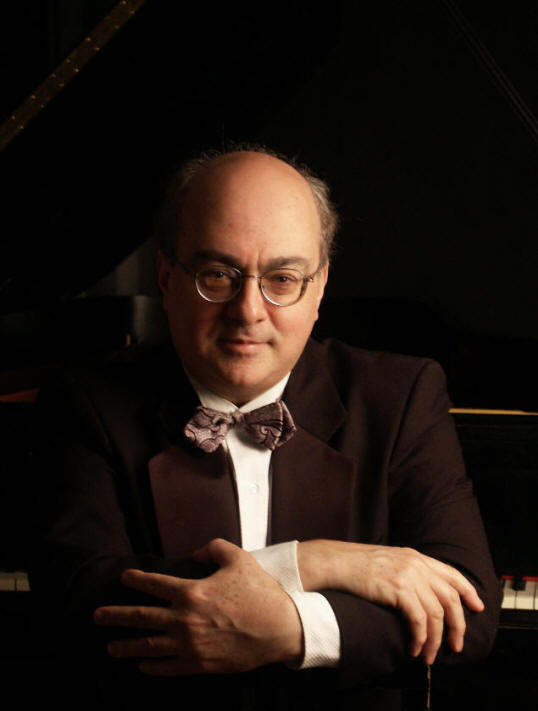
Mordecai Shehori, pianist

Mordecai Shehori (Hebrew: מרדכי שכורי; born 20 April 1946) is an Israeli-American pianist.

== Biography ==
Shehori was born in Israel and studied in Tel Aviv with Mindru Katz, whom he cites as his most influential teacher. At the age of nine he gave his first public performance. Later he received first prize in the Beethoven Competition and received the American Israel Cultural Foundation Award. In New York, he studied with Claude Frank at the Mannes College of Music and graduated from the Juilliard School.

Shehori made his New York debut after winning the 1974 Jeunesses Musicales Competition. He concertises in the United States, Canada, and Europe and has performed at various music festivals and at the White House. He has given 27 different recital programs in New York in as many years. His commercial recordings for Connoisseur Society and Cembal d'amour include music by Beethoven, Chopin, Scarlatti, Liszt, Rameau, Rachmaninoff, and many others. He is a two-time recipient of the La Gesse Foundation Award, and is listed on the roster of Steinway & Sons.

From 1971 to 1982, Shehori was piano teacher to Isaac and Vera Stern's children. In spite of that In 2014, Shehori has stated that Stern used his total control of the music world as the president of Carnegie Hall to dictate managements, presenters, record companies who he approves and who according to him should NOT have a career in music. He attempted to sabotage Shehori's career, as he did with the great violinists David Nadien, Berl Senofsky, Aaron Rosand, Shmuel Askenazi and many others, exerting huge and insulting pressure on Shehori's family to force him to return to Israel and by blocking any possibility of Shehori making a living as a concert pianist.

In February 1987, Shehori assisted Vladimir Horowitz in preparing Mozart's Piano Concerto K.488, playing the orchestral reduction on second piano, while Horowitz played the concerto's solo part. This took place in the basement of Steinway & Sons in New York City. Later that year, Horowitz traveled to Milan and recorded the concerto for Deutsche Grammophon with the La Scala Theater Orchestra conducted by Carlo Maria Giulini.

Horowitz was so pleased with Shehori's accompaniment that he began to invite him to his home on East 94th Street. Shehori spent many evenings with the Horowitzes. Shehori acted as page turner for Horowitz in what turned out to be the sessions for his final recording in Horowitz's New York home from October 24, 1989 to November 1, 1989. Horowitz died just a few days later, on November 5, 1989. Shehori has cited his friendship and artistic collaboration with Vladimir Horowitz as a significant source of knowledge and inspiration.

“Mordecai Shehori’s concert served as a welcome reminder that there is a place for originality in re-creations of classical materials.”

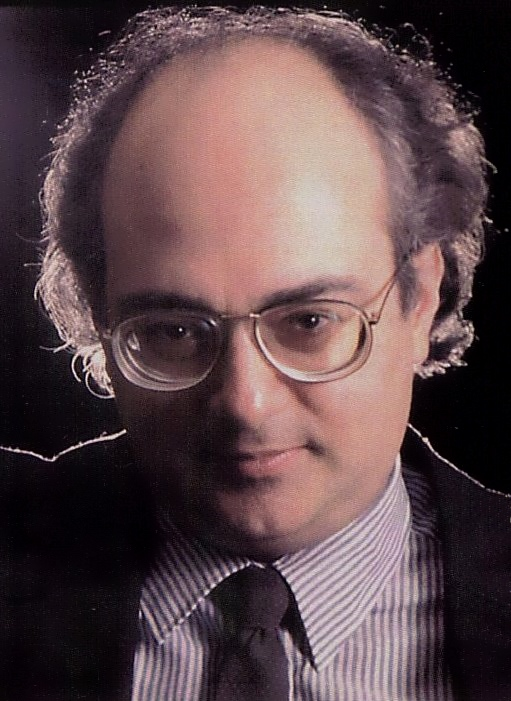
Mordecai Shehori, The Celebrated New York Concerts Vol 2 (2007 Cembal d'Amour)

== Reviews of Concerts ==
- Ericson, Raymond, et al. (1974). "Music in Review; Israeli Pianist in Debut Here" New York Times. March 24.
- (1976). "Mordecai Shehori Gives Piano Recital" New York Times. June 3.
- Ericson, Raymond (1979). "Piano Recital: Shehori Plays Three Sonatas". New York Times. May 26.
- Page, Tim (May 18, 1984). "Music: Mordecai Shehori". The New York Times.
- Rivers, Kate (1984). "Shehori: Poetry in Music" The Washington Post. November 3.
- Kimmelman, Michael (May 22, 1987). "Recital: Mordecai Shehori, Pianist, At Merkin Hall". The New York Times.
- Crutchfield, Will (June 9, 1989). "Review/Piano; Hearing More Than Beethoven Set Down". The New York Times.
- Henahan, Donal (May 9, 1990). "Review/Piano; A Recitalist to Undermine a Critic". The New York Times.
- Holland, Bernard (June 12, 1995). "In Performance; Classical Music - A Pianist Reconciles 2 Composers' Contrasts". The New York Times.
- Kozinn, Allan (May 22, 1997). "Classical Music in Review: Signs of a Poet, And a Daredevil". The New York Times.
- Kozinn, Allan (June 17, 2003). "Making a Lost Style Speak to Today's Ears". The New York Times.
- Schultz, Rick (2007). "A touch of Horowitz amid patter and pooches" Los Angeles Times. June 12.

== Reviews of Recordings ==
- Kozinn, Allan (September 29, 1991). "Record Brief - D. Scarlatti: Keyboard Sonatas (6); Beethoven: Piano Sonata No. 3; Brahms: Paganini Variations (Op. 35) Mordecai Shehori, piano. Connoisseur Society CD4177; CD". The New York Times.
- Duchen, Jessica. "Schubert/Liszt/Fauré, Mordecai Shehori (piano)" BBC Music Magazine.
- Distler, Jed. "Review: Learning by Example Volume 2." Classicstoday.com.
- Distler, Jed. "The New York Recitals Volume 1." Classicstoday.com.
- Turok, Paul. "Turok's Choice - April 2001" Andante.com.
- Lemco, Gary (July 2002). "Liszt: Love and the Devil" Audiophile Audition.
- Woolf, Jonathan (December 2002). "Classical CD Review - Rameau Mordecai Shehori, piano" Musicweb-International.com.
- Woolf, Jonathan (January 2003). "Classical CD Review - New York Recitals Volume 1 Mordecai Shehori, piano" Musicweb-International.com.
- Woolf, Jonathan (February 2003). "Classical CD Review - Franz Liszt Volume 1 Mordecai Shehori, piano" Musicweb-International.com.
- Woolf, Jonathan (April 2003). "Classical CD Review - Bach arr. Siloti, Handel, Beethoven, Chopin, Schubert arr. Liszt, Liszt Mordecai Shehori, piano" Musicweb-International.com.
- Woolf, Jonathan (March 2006). "Classical CD Review - Mozart, Beethoven, Chopin, Liszt Mordecai Shehori, piano" Musicweb-International.com.
- Brownell, Mike (January 2008). "The Celebrated New York Concerts - Vol 2" Allmusicguide.com.
- Woolf, Jonathan (March 2008). "Classical CD Review - Celebrated New York Concerts Volume 2 Mordecai Shehori, piano" Musicweb-International.com.
- Woolf, Jonathan (June 2008). "Mordecai Shehori Learning by Example Vols 1-3" Musicweb-International.com.
- Woolf, Jonathan (June 2008). "The Celebrated New York Concerts Volume 3 Mordecai Shehori, piano" Musicweb-International.com.
- Haylock, Julian (July 2008). "The Celebrated New York Concerts Volume 3 Mordecai Shehori, piano" International Piano Magazine.
- Lemco, Gary (July 2008). "The Celebrated New York Concerts Volume 2" Audiophile Audition.
- Lemco, Gary (January 2009). "The Celebrated New York Concerts Volume 3" Audiophile Audition.
- Woolf, Jonathan (February 2009). "CD Review - Mordecai Shehori plays Schumann & Liszt" Musicweb-International.com.
- Lemco, Gary (July 2009). "Shehori plays Mozart" Audiophile Audition.
- Lemco, Gary (September 2009). "Shehori plays Russian Music" Audiophile Audition.
- Lemco, Gary (June 2010). "BACH-BUSONI: Ten Chorale-Preludes; Chaconne in D Minor, from BWV 1004; Organ Toccata in C Major, BWV 564 - Mordecai Shehori, piano" Audiophile Audition.
- Lemco, Gary (September 2010). "Moscheles and Fetis: 'Methode des Methodes' - Mordecai Shehori, piano" Audiophile Audition.
- Lemco, Gary (January 2011). "Chopin Volume I: 19 Waltzes - Mordecai Shehori, piano" Audiophile Audition.
