= Mindru Katz =

Israeli musical artist

Mindru Katz מינדרו כץ
- Born: June 3, 1925; Bucharest, Romania
- Died: January 30, 1978 (aged 52) Istanbul, Turkey
- Genres: Classical
- Occupation: Musician
- Instrument: Piano
- Years active: 1947–1978
- Website: https://www.mindru-katz.com/

Mindru Katz (Hebrew: מינדרו כץ; 3 June 1925 – 30 January 1978) was a Romanian-Israeli classical pianist.

== Biography ==
Katz was born to Jewish parents in Bucharest in 1925. He was discovered as a child prodigy by the noted composer George Enescu, and taught by Florica Musicescu. He graduated from the Royal Academy of Music in Bucharest in 1947, in which year he also made his debut with the Bucharest Philharmonic Orchestra. He had an international career, visited 40 countries, and played under conductors: Sir John Barbirolli, Sir Adrian Boult, Sergiu Celibidache, Sergiu Comissiona, Antal Doráti, Josef Krips, Lorin Maazel, Harold Byrns, Yuval Zaliouk and Alfred Wallenstein.

Katz migrated to Israel in 1959. He joined the faculty of the Rubin Academy of Music in Tel Aviv, and became a professor of piano in 1972. His most notable pupils are Mordecai Shehori, Astrith Baltsan and Angela Borochov (née Angela Stone).

He was a jury member at the first Arthur Rubinstein International Piano Master Competition in Tel Aviv in 1974 (won by Emanuel Ax), together with Arthur Rubinstein himself, Arturo Benedetti Michelangeli, Eugene Istomin and others.

Katz was renowned particularly for his recorded interpretations of J. S. Bach, Beethoven, the concertos of Khachaturian and Prokofiev, and the violin sonatas of Brahms and Franck (with Henryk Szeryng; this was the only recording Szeryng ever made of the Franck Sonata). He also recorded the music of Chopin, Debussy, Enescu, Fauré, Haydn, Liszt, Mozart, Ravel, Shostakovich and Tchaikovsky. His recordings received consistently high critical acclaim, and his playing was often compared with that of Vladimir Horowitz.

His great performance is the Beethoven Emperor Concerto conducted by Sir John Barbirolli in 1958 on PYE records.

== Death ==
At the age of 52, Katz died of a heart attack on stage during a recital in Istanbul, Turkey, while performing Beethoven's Piano Sonata No. 17 in D minor, Tempest. He left behind a wife and daughter.
