= Rem Urasin =

Russian pianist

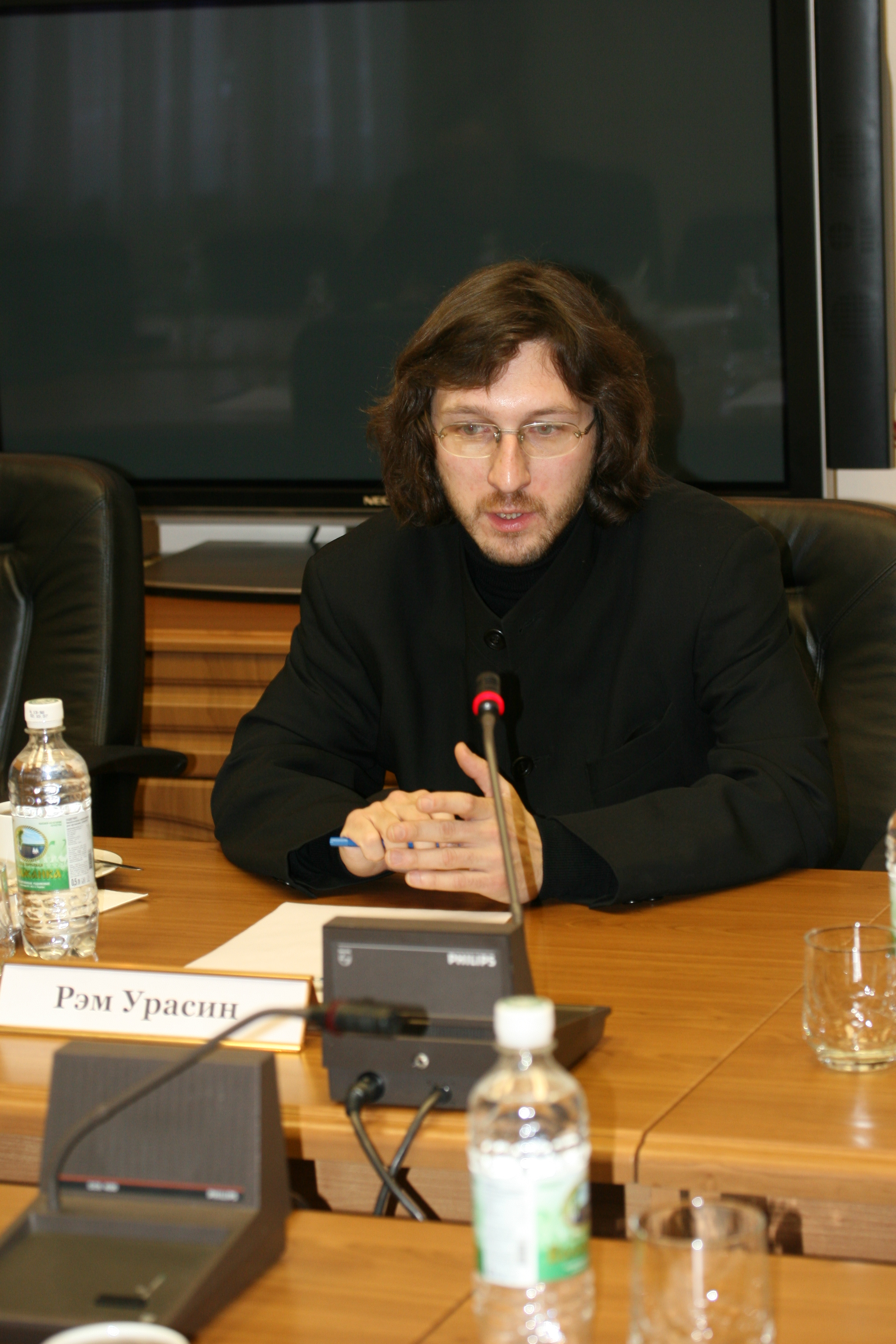
30 November 2007

Rem Urasin (born 10 May 1976, in Kazan) is a Russian pianist.

Rem Urasin began studying piano at the age of five under guidance from Marina Soukharenko at Special Music School, Kazan Conservatory. By the age of eight, Urasin was already performing with the Tatar Philharmonic Symphony Orchestra and when he turned 13, played works by renowned Polish composer, Frédéric Chopin.

From 1994 to 1999 he was trained at the Moscow Conservatory under Lev Naumov.

In 1995, Urasin was awarded 4th prize at the XIII International Chopin Piano Competition. He subsequently won the 2001 Monte-Carlo Music Masters competition and was second to John Chen at the 2004 Sydney International Piano Competition.

He also took part at the Van Cliburn International Piano Competition in 2005 and since 2000s performs with such venues as the Russian National Orchestra, the Moscow Philharmonic Orchestra, the Yekaterinburg Symphony Orchestra, the Warsaw National Philharmonic Orchestra, the Sydney Symphony Orchestra, and Vienna and Krakow Chamber Orchestras. He also collaborated with many musicians, among which were: Veronika Dudarova, Kazimierz Kord, Mischa Maisky, Fuat Mansurov, Mikhail Pletnev, Julian Rachlin, Alexander Rudin, Vladimir Spivakov, Nikolay Sivchuk and Antoni Wit.

In 2009 and 2010, Urasin prepared the vast Chopin cycle 'The Complete Works in Eleven Concerts', to commemorate the 200th anniversary of Chopin's birth. He has performed every composition Chopin wrote.
