= Ivana Švarc-Grenda =

Croatian pianist

Ivana Švarc-Grenda (born in Zagreb, 1970) is a Croatian pianist.

Švarc-Grenda was trained at the Peabody Conservatory in Baltimore, the Academy of the Arts in Berlin and Salzburg's Mozarteum, settling in Germany.

In the 90s she centered on Frédéric Chopin's music; she won prizes at the Chopin competitions in Baltimore and New York, and took part at the XIII Chopin Competition in Warszaw, where she reached the 2nd round.
