= Marina Nadiradze =

Georgian pianist

Marina Nadiradze მარინა ნადირაძე
- Born: 30 September 1978 (age 48); Tbilisi, Georgian SSR, Soviet Union
- Genre: Classical
- Occupation: Pianist
- Instrument: Piano

Marina Nadiradze (Note: Georgian: მარინა ნადირაძე, romanized: Marina Nadiradze) (born 30 September 1978) is a Georgian pianist.

She studied at the State Conservatoire in Tbilisi. As a nine-year-old she won the first of her international awards in Vilnius, Lithuania and since then has gone on to win 2nd Prize in the inaugural Tbilisi International Piano Competition in 1997, 1st Prize in the LASMO Staffa Award in 2000, and 2nd Prize and the Lawrence Glover Silver Medal at the Scottish International Piano Competition in 2001.

Later she studied at the Royal Scottish Academy of Music and Drama in Glasgow, Scotland.

Now based in Scotland, she performs solo works in concerts throughout Europe. Recently recorded live at recitals in Glasgow and at the Musique-Cordiale Festival in Seillans, France. She is known for her playing of romantic pieces, notably by Schubert, Ravel, Scarlatti, Scriabin, Schumann, Chopin and the Georgian composer Revaz Lagidze. She played the piano sequences for the movie Ae Fond Kiss....
