= Paolo Restani =

Italian pianist

- Born: 2 August 1967 (age 58); La Spezia, Italy
- Genres: Classical
- Occupation: Pianist
- Years active: 1983–present
- Website: paolorestani.com

Paolo Restani (born 2 August 1967, La Spezia) is an Italian classical pianist.

== Education ==
Piano-pupil of Vincenzo Vitale (a renowned representative of the Naples piano-school) since 1984, in the following he perfected his interpretative manner with Gerhard Oppitz at Hochschule für Musik und Theater München, Peter Lang at Mozarteum Salzburg, Gustav Kuhn, Piero Rattalino, Aldo Ciccolini, Nikita Magaloff and Vladimir Ashkenazy. In addition he studied composition with Paolo Arcà and Bruno Bettinelli.

== Career ==
After his debut in 1983 in recital at the Accademia Nazionale di Santa Cecilia in Rome, he was invited to the most prestigious theatres in Italy. Among several successes in this period, a standout one was the concert at Sala Verdi in Milan for the Serate Musicali when, in January 1987, he was invited to replace Alexis Weissenberg with only a few hours notice, and he performed a programme including the Eroica Variations by Beethoven and the 12 Etudes d’Exécution transcendante by Liszt.

During his almost thirty-year international concert career, his own solo-participations with European, American and Australian orchestras are innumerable. Among the conductors: Roberto Abbado, Gerd Albrecht, Piero Bellugi, Christian Benda, Yoram David, Vladimir Delman, Claus Peter Flor, Heiko Mathias Forster, Lu Jia, Lothar Koenigs, Gerard Korsten, Julian Kavatchev, Gustav Kuhn, Uroš Lajovic, Yoel Levi, John Nelson, John Neschling, Gunter Neuhold, Daniel Oren, Massimo Pradella, Donato Renzetti. Under the baton of Riccardo Muti he appeared in June 2004 with Orchestra Filarmonica della Scala in Liszt's Second Piano Concerto and, in 2008, again conducted by Muti, he was soloist in the symphonic production of Lélio ou Le Retour à la Vie op. 14b by Berlioz together with Gérard Depardieu, the Orchestra Luigi Cherubini, Orchestra Giovanile Italiana, Konzertvereinigung Wiener Staatsopernchor.

Recitals of recent seasons include the following events: Carnegie Hall in New York, Grosser Musikvereinsaal in Vienna, Konzerthaus in Berlin, Prinzregententheater in Münich, Rheingoldhalle in Mainz, New Congress-Hall in Innsbruck, International Performing Arts Centre in Moscow, Great Hall of the Philharmonic in St. Petersburg, Colon and Coliseo Theatres in Buenos Aires, London, Brussels, Frankfurt, Hamburg, Istanbul, Beirut, Santiago in Chile, Montevideo, Dubai, Kuwait City, Manama. In Italy: Milan (Teatro alla Scala, Auditorium La Verdi), Rome (Quirinale, Auditorium del Parco della Musica, Teatro dell’Opera, Auditorium di Via della Conciliazione, Teatro Sistina), Neaple (Teatro San Carlo, Teatro Augusteo, Politeama), Venice (Teatro La Fenice), Trieste (Teatro Verdi), Verona (Arena), Bologna (Teatro Comunale), Florence (Teatro Comunale, Teatro della Pergola), Turin (Teatro Regio, Auditorium RAI), Bari (Teatro Petruzzelli), Genoa (Teatro Carlo Felice), Palermo (Politeama). Prestigious musical festivals, where he is regularly invited, include: Flanders Festival, Martha Argerich Festival in Buenos Aires, London Hatchlands Music Festival, Istanbul Recitals, Al Bustan Festival in Beirut, Ljubljana Festival, Jornadas Internacionales de Piano in Oviedo, Asturias Festival, Ravenna Festival, Maggio Musicale Fiorentino, the Festival MITO in Milan, Rossini Opera Festival in Pesaro, Settembre Musica in Turin, Arturo Benedetti Michelangeli International Piano Festival in Brescia and Bergamo, Festival Verdi in Parma, Festival Uto Ughi per Roma, Panatenee Pompeiane, Festival Romaeuropa, Todi Arte Festival, Ravello Festival. In January 2008, at the invitation of Yuri Temirkanov, he participated in the XVII International Festival Christmas Musical Meeting in Palmira of the North in Saint Petersburg.

Among the various international appreciations he has been awarded, are to be pointed out those gained in South America (where he plays every year): in 2005 the Association of Argentina Critics recognized him as the best interpreter of the year, and in 2011, with the Quartetto d’archi della Scala as the best ensemble.

Beside his piano soloist activity, Paolo Restani dedicates himself to chamber music and theatre performances. Among his partners: Carla Fracci, Sylvie Guillelme, Laurent Hilaire, Enrico Maria Salerno, Simona Marchini, Mariano Rigillo, Gottfried Wagner. In partnership with Chiara Muti, in the last seasons, he created three original musical plays on the life of Mozart, on the relationships between Richard Wagner and Ludwig II, on Rachmaninov and Gogol. His extensive repertoire ranges from Bach to present-day composers. His particular preference for the Romantic and 19th-century repertoire makes him associated with most works by Field, Chopin, Schumann, Brahms, Debussy, Ravel, Stravinsky, Rachmaninov, and Casella. Of particular note is his predilection for the music of Liszt, of which he is considered one of the most authoritative interpreters.[3]

== Discography ==
- 1980 - Liszt Gnomenreigen (Phonotype Record)
- 1997 - Liszt Totentanz for piano and orchestra. European Philharmonic Orchestra conducted by Peter Jan Marthé (Polyglobe)
- 2004 - Liszt 12 Études d’Exécution Trascendante and Concert Études (Amadeus)
- 2008 - Rachmaninov 18 Preludes (Amadeus)
- 2008 - Casella Scarlattiana, Triplo Concerto, A notte alta for piano and orchestra. Orchestra Filarmonica ‘900 of Teatro Regio di Torino conducted by Marzio Conti (Brilliant Classics)
- 2009 - Brahms, Godowski, Skriabin, Saint-Saëns, Bartók, Liszt, Sancan Music for the Left Hand (DECCA)
- 2009 - Berlioz Lélio ou Le Retour à la vie op. 14b, conductor Riccardo Muti, Orchestra Luigi Cherubini, Orchestra Giovanile Italiana, Konzertvereinigung Wiener Staatsopernchor, Gérard Depardieu as narrator (CD and DVD Gruppo Editoriale l’Espresso)
- 2009 - Field The Seven Concertos for Piano and Orchestra. Orchestre Philharmonique de Nice conducted by Marco Guidarini (Brilliant Classics)
- 2010 - Brahms Variations on a Theme by Paganini op. 35, Variations from String Sextet op. 18, Five Studies (DECCA)
- 2010 - Rachmaninov Six Preludes, Transcriptions, Sonata no. 2 op. 36 (Amadeus)
- 2010 - The Ultimate Piano Concerto Collection includes his own interpretations (Brilliant Classics)
- 2010 - Piano Gold includes his own interpretations (Deutsche Grammophon)
- 2011 - Classica 2011 includes his own interpretations (Deutsche Grammophon)
- 2011 - Brahms Piano Quintet op. 34, Schumann Piano Quintet op. 44, with Quartetto d’archi della Scala (DECCA)
- 2011 - Brahms Handel Variations op. 24, Variations on a Theme by Schumann op. 9, Variations on an Original Theme op. 21 no. 1, Variations on a Hungarian Song op. 21 no. 2, Etude from Schubert's Impromptu op. 90 no. 2 (DECCA)
- 2012 - 50 Piano Masters includes his own interpretations (DECCA)
- 2016 - Romantic Piano Concertos includes his own interpretations (Brilliant Classics)
- 2018 - Beethoven Concerto for piano and orchestra no. 5 op. 73, Orchestra del Teatro Carlo Felice di Genova conductor Marco Guidarini. Wagner-Liszt Feierlicher Marsch aus Parsifal (Imd Music & Web)

== Bibliography ==
- Dizionario degli interpreti musicali (musica classica e operistica) Torino: Tea-UTET 1993. ISBN 9788878191952
- Piero Mioli, Dizionario di musica classica (dalle origini a oggi) Milano: BUR 2006. ISBN 9788817006491
- Michele Francolino, I.U.C 60 anni di musica Università di Roma “La Sapienza” 2004.
- Carlo de Incontrera e Alba Zanini, 1921-1991 La Filarmonica Laudamo di Messina Messina 1993.
- R. Antonio Peri, La Società del Quartetto di Bergamo 1904–2004.
- Paride Majone e Fulvio La Rosa, Le Associazioni Concertistiche di Pesaro (1882-2001).
- Edoardo Massa, Per una giusta causa La Spezia 2009.
- Joels Parducci e Paolo De Nevi, Da Bione alla Sprugolean La Spezia: Lunaeditore 1995.
- Wagner La Spezia Festival La Spezia 2014.
- Paolo Asti e Cesare Salvadeo, Fifty Giunti 2014. ISBN 9788890943324
- Paolo Isotta, La virtù dell’elefante Marsilio 2015. ISBN 9788831722544
