= David Syme (pianist) =

David Syme (born 1949) is an American pianist.

Syme has played classical concerts throughout the United States as well as numerous international venues. His major teachers were Jorge Bolet (Indiana University), Ozan Marsh (University of Arizona), Sascha Gorodnitzki (Juilliard) and studies in London with Louis Kentner.

In the 1990s, Syme played over 180 dates throughout the United States as GMC's "Musical Ambassador." He has also played for political dignitaries including the President of Mexico and President Bill Clinton. His George Gershwin performance in Mexico is shown repeatedly on the A&E Network as well as other arts channels.

In the year 2000, Syme was soloist with the Czech National Symphony playing several performances of Rhapsody in Blue.

He has recorded extensively including 20 CDs with orchestras like the Royal Philharmonic.

He now lives on the southwest coast of County Cork, Ireland, and he continues to tour internationally.
