= Alexei Sultanov =

Uzbek and American pianist (1969-2005)

Alexei Sultanov Aleksey Sultonov Алексей Султанов
- Born: August 7, 1969; Tashkent, Uzbek Soviet Socialist Republic
- Died: June 30, 2005 (aged 35) Fort Worth, Texas, US
- Genre: Classical
- Occupation: Pianist
- Instrument: Piano
- Website: https://web.archive.org/web/20241211113300/https://www.alexeisultanov.org/

Alexei Fayzulkhakovich Sultanov (Uzbek: Aleksey Fayzulhaqovich Sultonov, Russian: Алексей Файзулхакович Султанов; August 7, 1969 – June 30, 2005) was an Uzbek and American (since 2004) classical pianist.

== Biography ==
Alexei Sultanov was born to a family of musicians, his father a cellist, his mother a violinist, both music teachers. At the age of 6, he began piano lessons in Tashkent with Tamara Popovich and then with Lev Naumov at the Moscow Conservatory. At the age of thirteen he was a participant of the International Radio Competition for Young Musicians in Prague. He became famous after winning the Eighth Van Cliburn International Piano Competition on June 11, 1989, at the age of 19, the youngest contestant in that year's competition. Listeners were awed by his virtuosic technique, musicality, and dynamic range. After winning the Van Cliburn, he made appearances on The Tonight Show Starring Johnny Carson and Late Night with David Letterman.

In October 1995, Sultanov won second prize at the XIII International Chopin Piano Competition; the first prize was not awarded. Sultanov, considered the favorite by the public, boycotted the winners' concert. He went on to perform in North America, Europe and Asia. He performed at such venues as New York's Carnegie Hall and Washington's Kennedy Center.

In 1996 he had his first stroke, and despite his refusal was convinced by his wife Dace Abele to visit Ed Kramer, a neurologist. Kramer checked on him and discovered some small black spots which proved to him that blood clots had formed in the brain. Despite the stroke he continued his performance in Tokyo, but there he experienced yet another stroke. After that the same neurologist diagnosed him with diastolic heart failure. In February 2001, he had another stroke. The strokes damaged everything except the cerebral cortex and he was able to continue performing while sitting in a wheelchair.

He became an American citizen in 2004.

On June 30, 2005, at 4:30 a.m., he suffocated following a stroke. He died at the age of 35 in Fort Worth at home.

== Memorabilia ==
His performances of concerti by Tchaikovsky and Rachmaninoff were recorded, with Maxim Shostakovich conducting the London Symphony Orchestra, and were published under the Teldec Classics label, while his other albums such as the Fantaisie–Impromptu of 1997 and Sultanov plays Chopin which was released two years later were published by the Arts Core Corporation. He also was a part of a PBS documentary called Here to Make Music which was produced by Peter Rosen for US viewers. The film won an award and has been aired worldwide ever since.
