= Duo Crommelynck =

Duo Crommelynck was a classical piano duo active from 1974 to 1994. It consisted of the Belgian Patrick Crommelynck and his Japanese-born wife Taeko Kuwata. In 1994, at the height of their fame, they each took their own lives.

== Biographies ==
Patrick Crommelynck was born in Brussels in 1945, Taeko Kuwata in Tokyo in 1947. Patrick studied with Stefan Askenase at the Brussels Conservatory, with Victor Merzhanov at the Moscow Conservatory, and with Dieter Weber in Vienna, where he met Taeko Kuwata, who was another of Weber's students. They married and formed their duo in 1974. They came to attention with their two-piano version of Brahms's 4th Symphony. They achieved considerable praise and recognition and were considered one of the world's leading piano duos. They toured widely and a number of composers wrote works for them. These included André Tchaikowsky's Invention 5b, dedicated to Patrick, and another André Tchaikowsky composition Tango and then Mazurka were arranged for the duo.

Duo Crommelynck made a number of recordings for the Swiss Claves label. They recorded music by Auric, Bizet, Brahms, Debussy, Dvořák, Fauré, Messager, Milhaud, Poulenc, Ravel, Schubert, Smetana, Johann Strauss II, and Tchaikovsky. These included 2-piano arrangements of Tchaikovsky's Pathétique Symphony, Dvořák's New World Symphony, and Smetana's Vltava from Má vlast. Their three-disc set of the four-hand piano works of Schubert won a Grand Prix du Disque from the Académie Charles Cros. They also recorded an entire CD of fragments and unfinished pieces by Mozart.

== Suicides ==
During the weekend of 9–10 July 1994, at the height of their joint careers, they took their own lives in Brussels after an apparent crisis in their relationship. Patrick hanged himself first and his body was discovered by Taeko, who also decided to end her own life in the same way. Their bodies were discovered on Monday 11 July.

The Athénée Royal de Woluwe-Saint-Pierre, a Brussels school founded in 1956, was renamed Athénée Royal Crommelynck, de Woluwe-Saint-Pierre after their deaths, in commemoration not only of them but also of other famous Crommelyncks, including the dramatist Fernand Crommelynck.
