= Moshe Zorman =

Israeli composer (born 1952)

Moshe Zorman משה זורמן
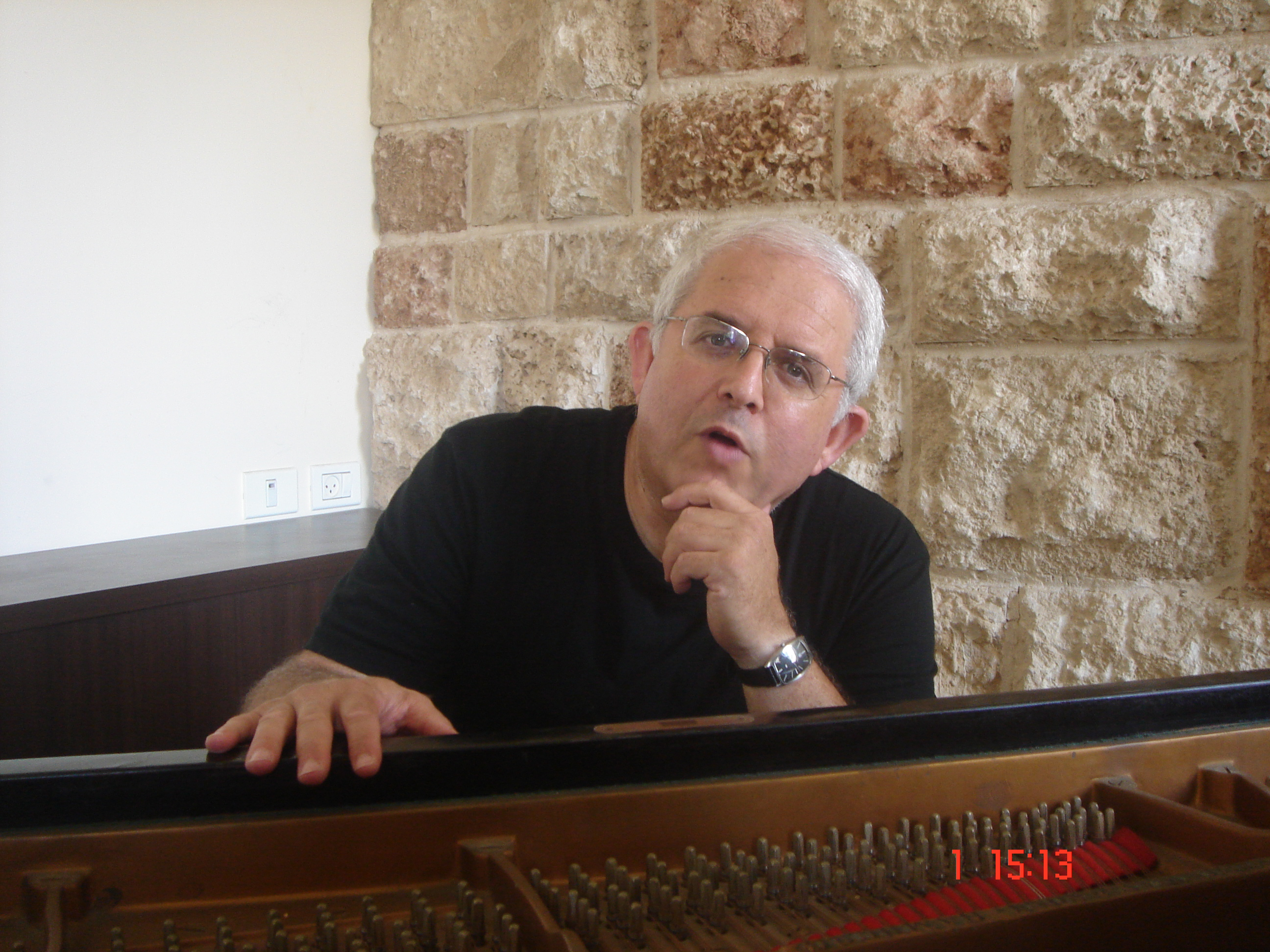
- Zorman in his house

Background information
- Born: May 15, 1952 (age 74)
- Occupations: Composer, arranger, conductor, pianist, musicologist

Moshe Zorman (Hebrew: משה זורמן; born 15 May 1952) is an Israeli composer, winner of the ACUM award for lifetime achievement (2023). His works include nine operas —among them “The Inn of Spirits” after Natan Alterman's play of the same name—as well as works for symphony orchestra, chamber groups and choirs. His works and arrangements have been performed by the Israel Philharmonic Orchestra, the Welsh BBC Orchestra, the Jerusalem Symphony Orchestra (IBA), the Israel Sinfonietta Beer-Sheva and the Baltimore Symphony, among others. He has also written music for theatre productions at the Habima and Cameri theatres in Israel and for the Inbal and Bat-Sheva dance companies.

== Biography ==
Zorman studied composition with Prof. Leon Schidlowsky and Prof. Tzvi Avni. After graduating from the Tel Aviv Music Academy, he studied for his Ph.D at New York City University Graduate Ceber CUNY with George Perle and participated in composers’ seminars in Vermont (with Mario Davidovsky) and in Canada (with John Cage). He returned to Israel in 1985 to teach at Tel Aviv University and is a professor at the Levinsky College of Education. |occupation=Composer, arranger, musicologist Zorman was a member of the Israel Composers' League Board of Directors, and initiated a series of concerts dedicated to Israeli composers. He is also a member of different music committees in the Israel Ministry of Education. From 1990 to 1996 he was the head of the Music Department at the Levinsky Teachers’ College in Tel Aviv. He continues to teach at the college, and is currently head of the Music Cathedra at the Einav Cultural Center in Tel Aviv.

== Awards ==
- ACUM award for lifetime achievement (2023)
- The Mifal Hayis Landau Prize for contemporary classical composer (2017)
- Israel Prime minister's prize for composers (2002)
- “the Sam Spiegel School” in Jerusalem for music for film, (2002)
- ACUM Prize for original composition (1993).
