= Karl Rönisch =

German piano manufacturer

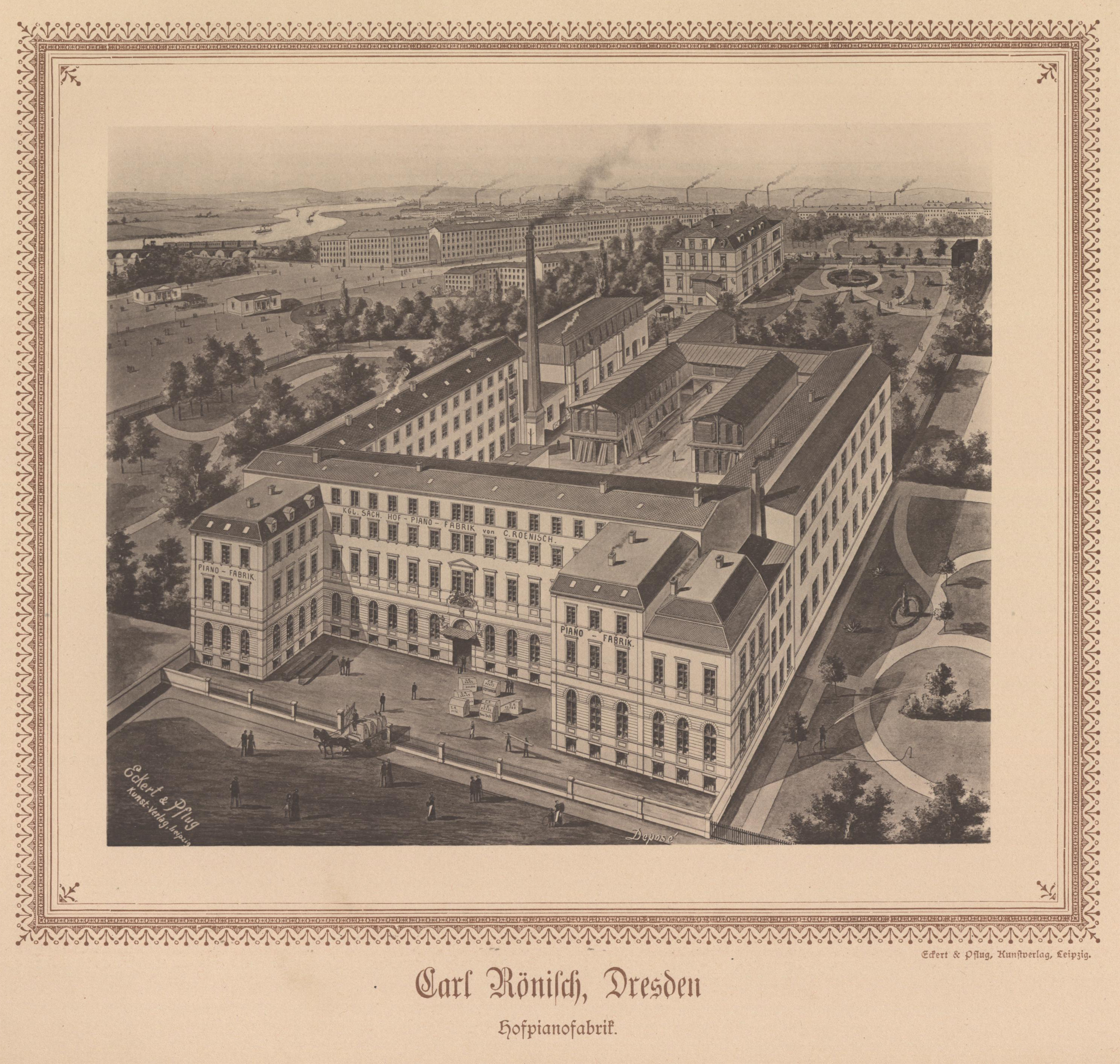
- Carl Rönisch in Dresden, Hofpianofabrik Wallgässchen 1
- Company type: Private
- Industry: Musical instruments
- Founded: 1897; 129 years ago
- Founder: Karl Rönisch
- Headquarters: Dresden, Germany
- Products: Pianos
- Owner: Blüthner
- Website: roenisch-pianos.de/

Karl Rönisch is a piano manufacturer in Dresden, Germany.

The owner Karl Moritz Hermann Rönisch was awarded an imperial and royal warrant of appointment to the court of Austria-Hungary.

The company exported to Russia and, to avoid high tariffs, built a factory in St. Petersburg in 1897, parts for which were still manufactured in Dresden, in the main factory. In 1918, Hermann Rönisch, the son of the company's founder, sold the "Carl Rönisch Hof-Pianofabrik" to Ludwig Hupfeld AG in Leipzig after his grandson, who had been designated as his successor, had been killed in the First World War. He had been associated with Ludwig Hupfeld as a business partner since 1902.

In 2009, the company merged with Blüthner and the production was moved to Blüthner factory in Leipzig, Germany. In 1945, most of Rönisch's main factory in Dresden's Innere Neustadt fell victim to the air raids on Dresden. Since 1948, instruments bearing the Rönisch brand name have been built at the "Leipziger Pianofortefabrik", the main factory of Ludwig Hupfeld AG in the Böhlitz-Ehrenberg district of Leipzig.

Recordings made with instruments by Karl Rönisch

- Gudrun Schaumann, Wolfgang Brunner. Robert Schumann, Clara Schumann, Albert Dietrich, Johannes Brahms, Theodor Kirchner, Carl Reinecke. The Circle of Robert Schumann Vol.2. Label: Capriccio. Played on pianos by Rönisch (1872) and Streicher (1836 and 1870).
- Alexander Baillie, John Thwaites. Johannes Brahms. Sonaten für Violoncello und Klavier, Vier ernste Gesänge. Label: Somm. Played on pianos by Rönisch (1860), Ehrbar (1877) and Streicher (1878).
- Primrose Piano Quartet. Johannes Brahms. The Piano Quartets. Label: Meridian Records. Played on pianos by Rönisch, Blüthner and Streicher.
- Stenzl Pianoduo. Wolfgang Amadeus Mozart. Sonaten KV 448, 497, Fantasie f-moll KV 608. Label: Ars Musici. Played on two pianos by Rönisch (c. 1862 and 1872).
- Werner Güra, Christoph Berner. Franz Schubert. Die Winterreise. Label: Harmonia Mundi . Played on a Rönisch piano (1872).
- Marlis Petersen, Anke Vondung, Werner Güra, Konrad Jarnot, Christoph Berner. Franz Schubert. Licht und Liebe. Label: Harmonia Mundi . Played on a Rönisch piano.
- Daniel Johannsen, Andreas Fröschl. Hugo Wolf. 360° Hugo Wolf. Label: Spektral Records. Played on a Rönisch piano (1872).

== Current grand piano models ==
| Model | Length | Weight |
|---|---|---|
| 175 | 175 cm | 320 kg |
| 186 | 186 cm | 330 kg |
| 210 | 210 cm | 350 kg |

== Current upright piano models ==
| Model | Height | Weight |
|---|---|---|
| 118 | 118 cm | 210 kg |
| 125 | 125 cm | 230 kg |
| 132 | 132 cm | 250 kg |
