= Friedrich Ehrbar =

Austrian piano maker (1827–1905)

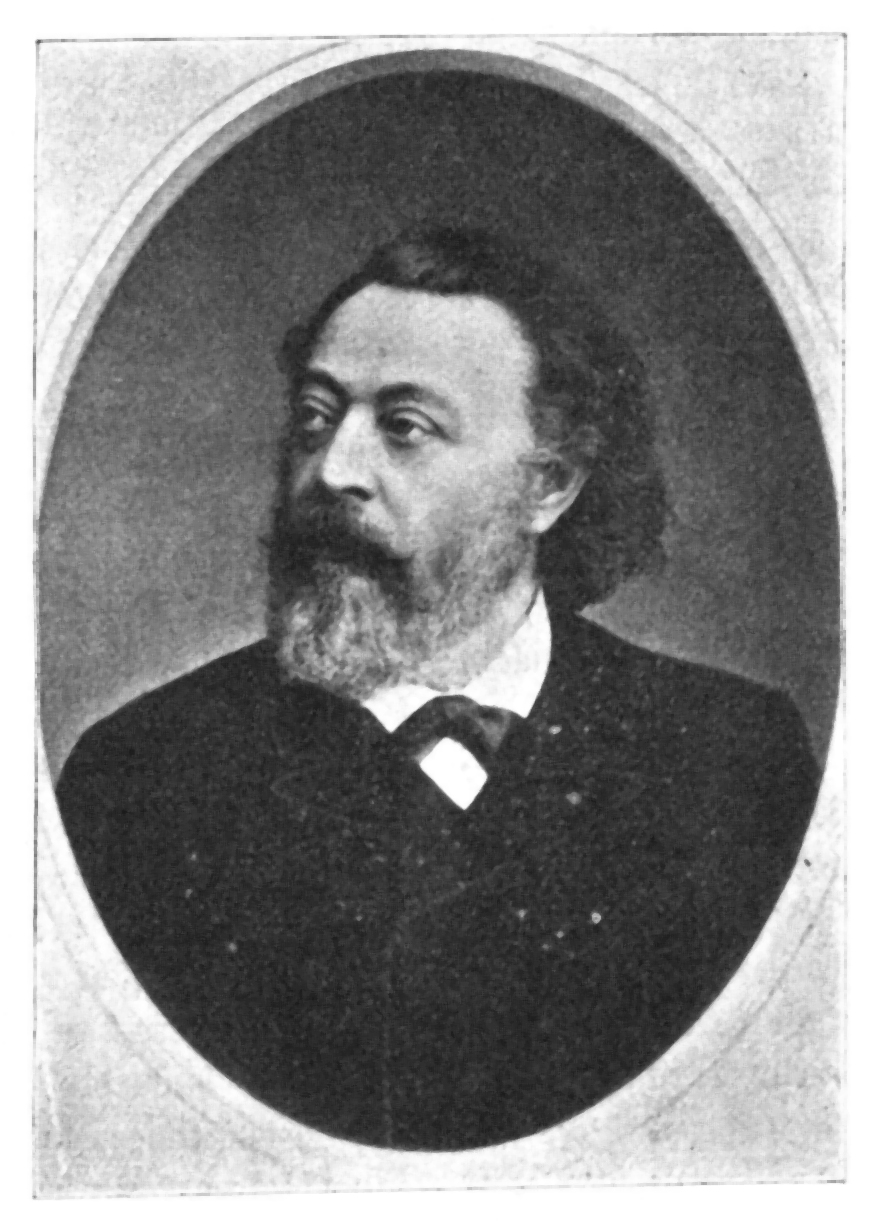
- Born: 1827
- Died: 1905 (aged 77–78)
- Occupation: Manufacturer

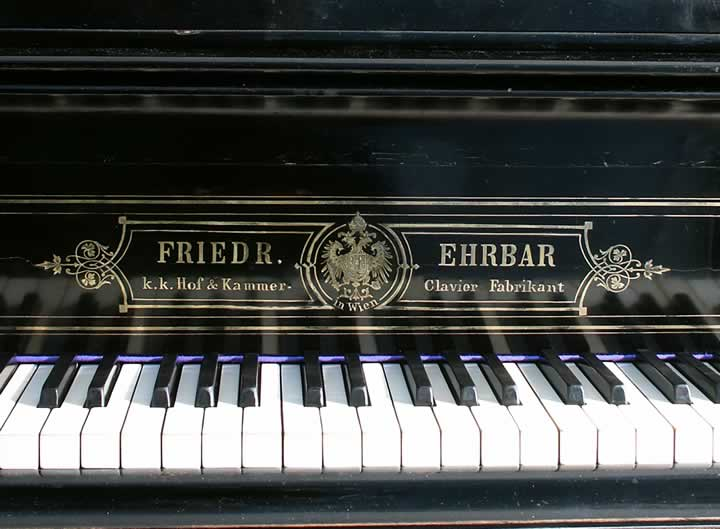
Signature of Friedr. Ehrbar on piano lid

Friedrich Ehrbar was a piano manufacturer in Vienna, Austria.

== History ==
Friedrich Ehrbar (1827-1905) took over the company in 1857 after the passing of Eduard Seuffert (1819-1855). In 1876 he had the Palais Ehrbar with its own concert hall constructed, in which renowned artists such as Johannes Brahms, Anton Bruckner and Gustav Mahler performed. For the excellence of his products he was awarded an imperial and royal warrant of appointment to the Emperor and King of Austria-Hungary. He was also awarded a warrant of appointment to Archduke Otto, imperial warrant of appointment to the Ottoman Sultan, a royal warrant of appointment to the King of Greece, the King of Serbia, the King of Portugal, and many others.

His successor was Friedrich Benedict Ernst Ehrbar Jun. (1873-1921), who was also president of the Wiener Singakademie from 1900 until his death. He was also awarded an imperial and royal warrant of appointment to the Emperor and King of Austria-Hungary.

Recordings made with instruments by Ehrbar

- Alexander Baillie, John Thwaites. Johannes Brahms. Sonaten für Violoncello und Klavier, Vier ernste Gesänge. Label: Somm. Played on pianos by Karl Rönisch (1860), Friedrich Ehrbar (1877) and Johann Baptist Streicher (1878).
- Simona Eisinger, Zuzana Ferjenčíková. Sergei Rachmaninoff, Robert Schumann, Johannes Brahms, Richard Strauss. Seelenverwandt. Label: Schwechtenstein-Records. Played on pianos by Streicher (1847), Ehrbar (1878) and Ludwig Bösendorfer (1893).
- Werner Güra, Christoph Berner. Robert Schumann, Clara Schumann, Johannes Brahms. Schöne Wiege meiner Leiden. Label: Harmonia Mundi . Played on a Ehrbar piano (1877-1878).
- Werner Güra, Christoph Berner. Franz Schubert. Schwanengesang. Label: Harmonia Mundi . Played on a Ehrbar piano (1877-1878).
- Dénise Beck, Christina Baader, Christian Lambour, Gert Hecher, Ilia Korol, Lehel Donáth. Eusebius Mandyczewski. Lieder, Gesänge, Walzer. Label: Harmonia Mundi . Played on Ehrbar pianos (1875 and 1891).
