= Blüthner (disambiguation) =

Blüthner may refer to:

- 10857 Blüthner, a main belt asteroid
- Blüthner, a German piano brand
- Blüthner Orchestra, a German orchestra supported by the piano maker
- Julius Blüthner, a German piano maker
