= Winterreise =

1828 song cycle by Franz Schubert

- Song cycle by Franz Schubert
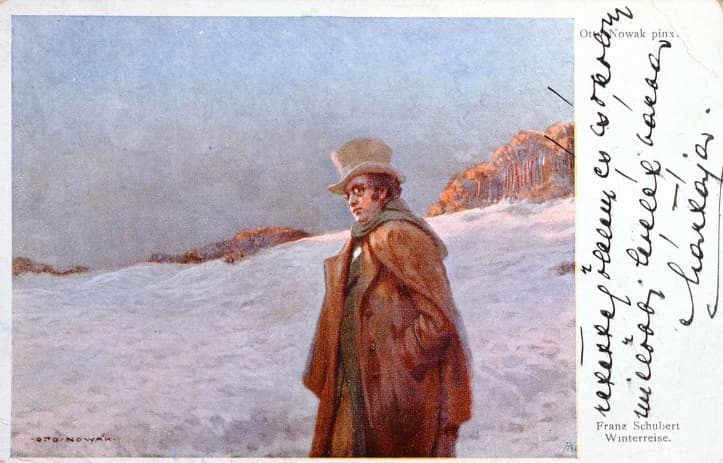
- A 1910 postcard with a painting, by Otto Robert Nowak, of Schubert in the snow
- English: Winter Journey
- Catalogue: D. 911
- Opus: 89
- Text: Poems by Wilhelm Müller
- Language: German
- Composed: 1827
- Published: 1828
- Movements: 24
- Scoring: tenor; piano

Winterreise (German pronunciation: [ˈvɪntɐˌʁaɪzə], Winter Journey) is a song cycle for voice and piano by Franz Schubert (D. 911, published as Op. 89 in 1828), a setting of 24 poems by German poet Wilhelm Müller. It is the second of Schubert's two song cycles on Müller's poems, the earlier being Die schöne Müllerin (D. 795, Op. 25, 1823).

Both were originally written for tenor voice but are frequently transposed to other vocal ranges, a precedent set by Schubert himself. The two works pose interpretative demands on listeners and performers due to their scale and structural coherence. Although Ludwig van Beethoven's cycle An die ferne Geliebte (To the Distant Beloved) was published earlier, in 1816, Schubert's cycles hold the foremost place in the genre's history.

The cycle consists of a monodrama from the point of view of the wandering protagonist, in which concrete plot is somewhat ambiguous. After his beloved falls for another, the grief-stricken young man steals away from town at night and follows the river and steep ways to a charcoal burner's hut, where he rests before moving on. He comes across a village, passes a crossroads, and arrives at a cemetery. Here being denied even the death on which he has become fixated, he defiantly renounces faith before reaching a point of resignation. Finally he encounters a derelict street musician, the only instance in the cycle in which another character is present. The mysterious and ominous nature of the musician, along with the question posed in the last lines, leave the fate of the wanderer open to interpretation.

The autograph manuscript of the cycle is preserved in the Morgan Library & Museum.

== Authorship and composition ==
Winterreise was composed in two parts, each with twelve songs, the first part in February 1827 and the second in October 1827. The two parts were also published separately by Tobias Haslinger, the first on 14 January 1828, and the second (the proofs of which Schubert was still correcting days before his death on 19 November) on 30 December 1828.

The text consists of poems by Wilhelm Müller. Müller, a poet, soldier and Imperial Librarian at Dessau in Prussia (present-day east-central Germany), died in 1827 aged 32, and probably never heard the first setting of his poems in Die schöne Müllerin (1823), let alone Winterreise. Die schöne Müllerin had become central to the performing repertoire and partnership of Schubert with his friend, the baritone singer Johann Michael Vogl, who introduced Schubert's songs to many people in their tours through Austria in the mid-1820s.

Schubert found the first twelve poems under the title Wanderlieder von Wilhelm Müller. Die Winterreise. In 12 Liedern in an almanack (Urania. Taschenbuch auf das Jahr 1823) published in Leipzig in 1823. His intimate friend Franz von Schober had provided this book for him. It was after he set these, in February 1827, that he discovered the full series of poems in Müller's book of 1824, Poems from the posthumous papers of a travelling horn-player, dedicated to the composer Carl Maria von Weber (godfather of Müller's son F. Max Müller), "as a pledge of his friendship and admiration". Weber died in 1826. On 4 March 1827, Schubert invited a group of friends to his lodgings intending to sing the first group of songs, but he was out when they arrived, and the event was postponed until later in the year, when the full performance was given.

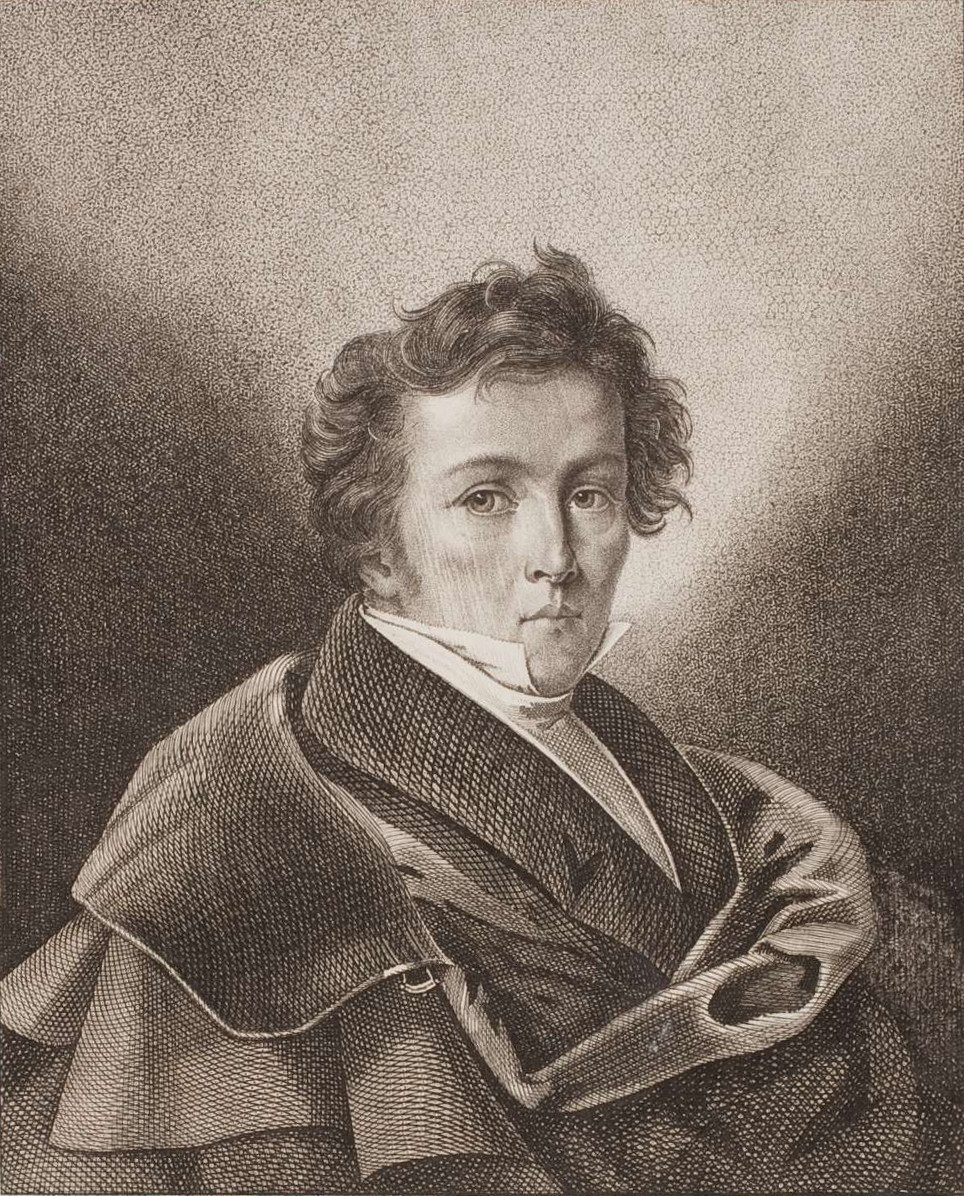
Wilhelm Müller

Between the 1823 and 1824 editions, Müller varied the texts slightly and also (with the addition of the further 12 poems) altered the order in which they were presented. Owing to the two stages of composition, Schubert's order in the song-cycle preserves the integrity of the cycle of the first twelve poems published and appends the twelve new poems as a Fortsetzung (Continuation), following Müller's order (if one excludes the poems already set) with the one exception of switching "Die Nebensonnen" and "Mut!". In the complete book edition, Müller's final running-order was as follows:

"Gute Nacht"; "Die Wetterfahne"; "Gefror'ne Tränen"; "Erstarrung"; "Der Lindenbaum"; "Die Post"; "Wasserflut"; "Auf dem Flusse"; "Rückblick"; "Der greise Kopf"; "Die Krähe"; "Letzte Hoffnung"; "Im Dorfe"; "Der stürmische Morgen"; "Täuschung"; "Der Wegweiser"; "Das Wirtshaus"; "[Das] Irrlicht"; "Rast"; "Die Nebensonnen"; "Frühlingstraum"; "Einsamkeit"; "Mut!"; "Der Leiermann".

Thus, Schubert's numbers would run 1–5, 13, 6–8, 14–21, 9–10, 23, 11–12, 22, 24, a sequence occasionally attempted by Hans Joachim Moser and Günther Baum.

Schubert's original group of settings therefore closed with the dramatic cadence of "Irrlicht", "Rast", "Frühlingstraum" and "Einsamkeit", and his second sequence begins with "Die Post". Dramatically, the first half is the sequence from the leaving of the beloved's house, and the second half the torments of reawakening hope and the path to resignation.

In Winterreise Schubert raises the importance of the pianist to a role equal to that of the singer. In particular, the piano's rhythms constantly express the moods of the poet, like the distinctive rhythm of "Auf dem Flusse", the restless syncopated figures in "Rückblick", the dramatic tremolos in "Einsamkeit", the glimmering clusters of notes in "Irrlicht", or the sharp accents in "Der stürmische Morgen". The piano supplies rich effects in the nature imagery of the poems, the voices of the elements, the creatures and active objects, the rushing storm, the crying wind, the water under the ice, birds singing, ravens croaking, dogs baying, the rusty weathervane grating, the post horn calling, and the drone and repeated melody of the hurdy-gurdy.

== Opinions of Schubert's intentions ==
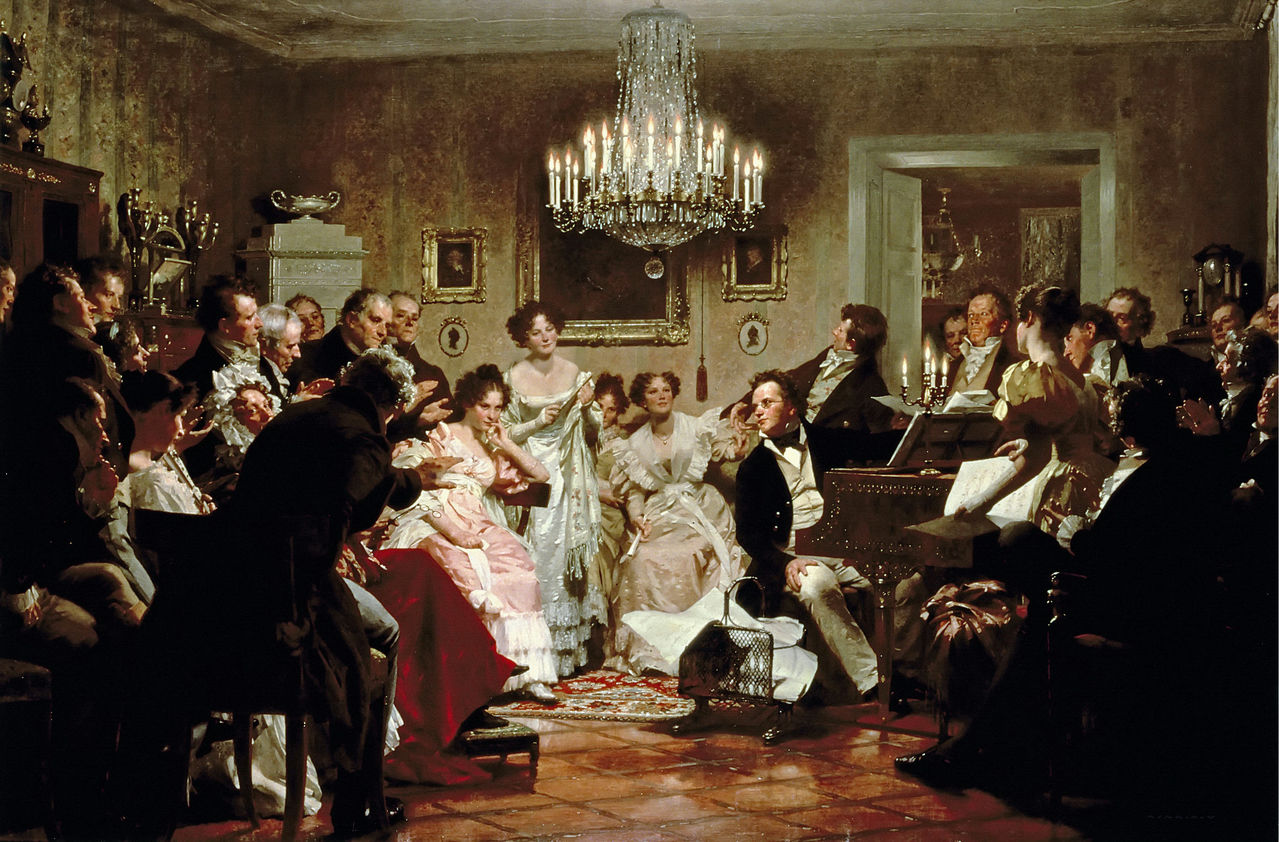
Julius Schmid's 1897 painting, Schubertiade

Many have attempted to explain the reason Schubert composed Winterreise. A possible explanation is documented in a book by Elizabeth Norman McKay, Schubert: The Piano and Dark Keys: "Towards the end of 1822 ... Schubert was very sick, having contracted the syphilis that inevitably was to affect the remainder of his life: his physical and mental health, and the music he was to compose." As detailed below, he worked on Winterreise as he was dying of syphilis.

In addition to his friend Franz von Schober, Schubert's friends who often attended his Schubertiaden or musical sessions included Eduard von Bauernfeld, Joseph von Spaun, and the poet Johann Mayrhofer. Both Spaun and Mayrhofer describe the period of the composition of Winterreise as one in which Schubert was in a deeply melancholic frame of mind, as Mayrhofer puts it, because "life had lost its rosiness and winter was upon him." Spaun tells that Schubert was gloomy and depressed, and when asked the reason replied,

"Come to Schober's today and I will play you a cycle of terrifying songs; they have affected me more than has ever been the case with any other songs." He then, with a voice full of feeling, sang the entire Winterreise for us. We were altogether dumbfounded by the sombre mood of these songs, and Schober said that one song only, "Der Lindenbaum", had pleased him. Thereupon Schubert leaped up and replied: "These songs please me more than all the rest, and in time they will please you as well."

It is argued that in the gloomy nature of the Winterreise, compared with Die schöne Müllerin, there is:

"a change of season, December for May, and a deeper core of pain, the difference between the heartbreak of a youth and a man. There is no need to seek in external vicissitudes an explanation of the pathos of the Winterreise music when the composer was this Schubert who, as a boy of seventeen, had the imagination to fix Gretchen's cry in music once for all, and had so quivered year by year in response to every appeal, to Mignon's and the Harper's grief, to Mayrhofer's nostalgia. It is not surprising to hear of Schubert's haggard look in the Winterreise period; but not depression, rather a kind of sacred exhilaration... we see him practically gasping with fearful joy over his tragic Winterreise – at his luck in the subject, at the beauty of the chance which brought him his collaborator back, at the countless fresh images provoked by his poetry of fire and snow, of torrent and ice, of scalding and frozen tears. The composer of the Winterreise may have gone hungry to bed, but he was a happy artist."

Schubert's last task in life was the correction of the proofs for part 2 of Winterreise, and his thoughts while correcting those of the last song, "Der Leiermann", when his last illness was only too evident, can only be imagined. However, he had heard the whole cycle performed by Vogl (which received a much more enthusiastic reception), though he did not live to see the final publication, nor the opinion of the Wiener Theaterzeitung:

Müller is naive, sentimental, and sets against outward nature a parallel of some passionate soul-state which takes its colour and significance from the former. Schubert's music is as naive as the poet's expressions; the emotions contained in the poems are as deeply reflected in his own feelings, and these are so brought out in sound that no-one can sing or hear them without being touched to the heart.

Elena Gerhardt said of the Winterreise, "You have to be haunted by this cycle to be able to sing it."

== Nature of the work ==
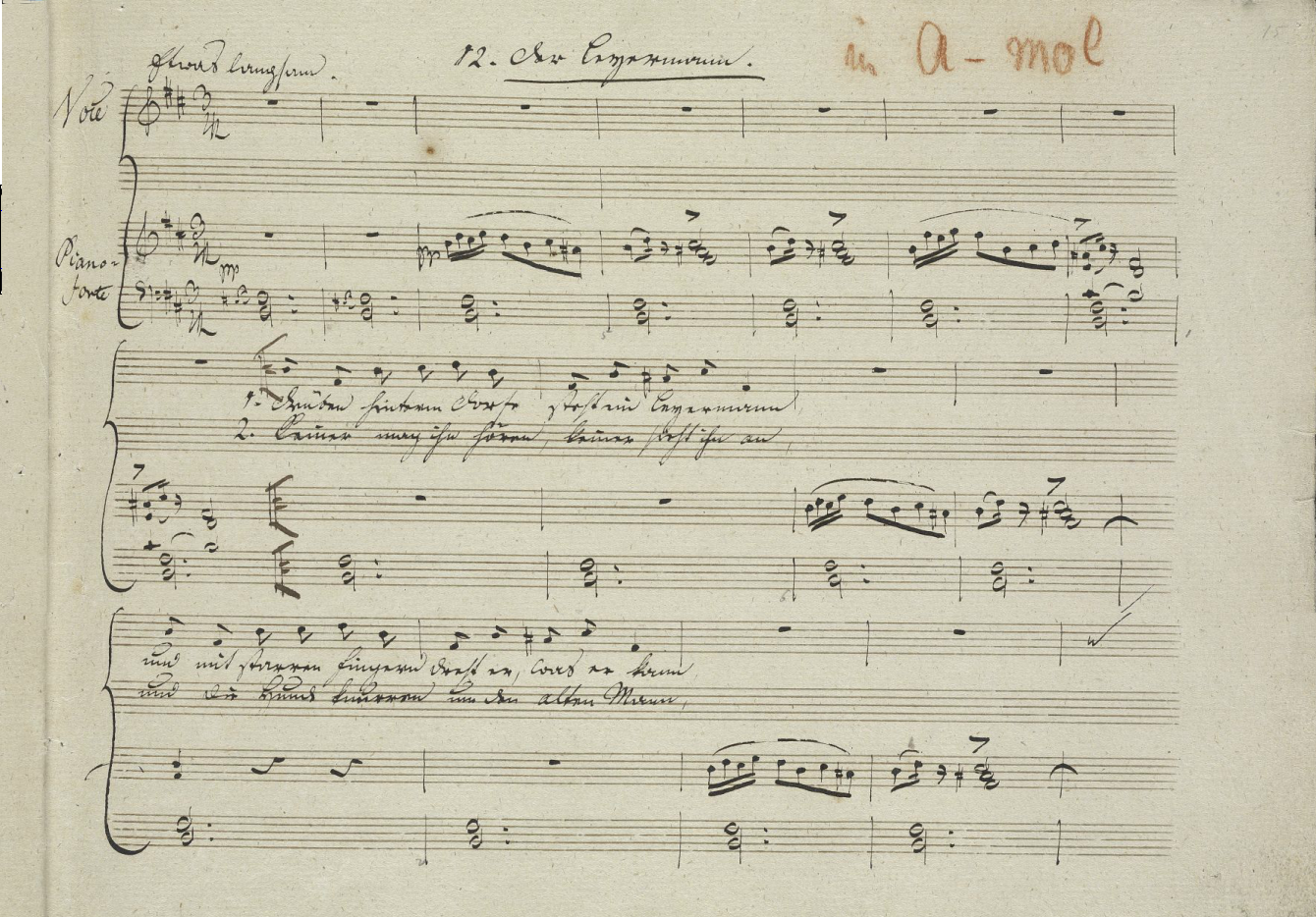
First page of the autograph score of "Der Leiermann"

In his introduction to the Peters edition (with the critical revisions of Max Friedlaender), Professor Max Müller, son of the poet Wilhelm Müller, remarks that Schubert's two song-cycles have a dramatic effect not unlike that of a full-scale tragic opera, particularly when performed by great singers such as Jenny Lind (Die schöne Müllerin) or Julius Stockhausen (Winterreise). Like Die schöne Müllerin, Schubert's Winterreise is not merely a collection of songs upon a single theme (lost or unrequited love) but is in effect one single dramatic monologue, lasting over an hour in performance. Although some individual songs are sometimes included separately in recitals (e.g. "Gute Nacht", "Der Lindenbaum" and "Der Leiermann"), it is a work which is usually presented in its entirety.

The intensity and the emotional inflections of the poetry are carefully built up to express the sorrows of the lover and are developed to an almost pathological degree from the first to the last note, something explored (along with the cultural context of the work) by the tenor Ian Bostridge in Schubert's Winter Journey: Anatomy of an Obsession. Over the course of the cycle, grief over lost love progressively gives way to more general existential despair and resignation – the beloved is last directly mentioned only halfway into the work – and the literal winter's journey is arguably at least in part allegorical for this psychological and spiritual one. Wintry imagery of cold, darkness, and barrenness consistently serve to mirror the feelings of the isolated wanderer.

The two Schubert cycles are fundamentals of the German Lied and have influenced not only style but also vocal method and technique in German classical music.

== Songs ==
A breakdown of each of the 24 songs is given below.

"Gute Nacht" (All by Hans Duhan, 1928)

1. "Gute Nacht" ("Good Night"): "A stranger I arrived; a stranger I depart." In May, he won the love of a girl and hoped to marry her. But now his world is bleak, and he must leave, in winter, in the dead of night, finding his own way in the trackless snow. "Love loves to wander—from one person to the next." He writes "Good Night" on her gate as he passes to show he thought of her.

"Die Wetterfahne"

2. "Die Wetterfahne" ("The Weathervane"): The weathervane on her house creaks in the shifting winds, mocking him and showing the inconstant hearts inside. "What do they care about my suffering? Their child is a wealthy bride!"

"Gefror'ne Tränen"

3. "Gefror'ne Tränen" ("Frozen Tears"): He notices he has been crying and chides his tears for being only lukewarm so that they freeze. They come out of his heart hot enough to melt all the winter's ice!

"Erstarrung"

4. "Erstarrung" ("Benumbed"): He looks in vain for her footprints beneath the snow where she once walked with him through the green meadow; he wants to melt away the snow and ice with his tears. He has nothing to remember her by except his pain. She is frozen in his heart; if it thaws, her image will flow away.

"Der Lindenbaum"

5. "Der Lindenbaum" ("The Linden Tree"): The tree, a reminder of happier days, seems to call to him as he passes by in the depth of night, promising rest. But he turns away, into the cold wind. And now, miles away, he still hears it calling him: "Here you would find peace."

"Wasserflut"

6. "Wasserflut" ("The Watercourse"): The cold snow thirstily sucks up his tears; when the warm winds blow, the snow and ice will melt, and the brook will carry them through the town to where his sweetheart lives.

"Auf dem Flusse"

7. "Auf dem Flusse" ("On the Stream"): The gaily rushing stream lies silent under a hard crust. In the ice, he carves a memorial to the love between him and his sweetheart. The river is an image of his heart swelling up powerfully beneath the frozen surface.

"Rückblick"

8. "Rückblick" ("Looking Backward"): He recounts his headlong flight from the town and recalls his springtime arrival in the "city of inconstancy," and two girlish eyes which captivated him. When he thinks of that time, he would like to go back and stand silently in front of her house.

"Irrlicht"

9. "Irrlicht" ("Will-o'-the-wisp"): The false light of the will-o'-the-wisp has led him astray, but he is accustomed to that. Every path leads to the same goal. Our joys and sorrows are all a will-o'-the-wisp's game. Just like how every stream reaches the sea, so does every sorrow its grave.

"Rast"

10. "Rast" ("Rest"): Only now that he has stopped to rest in a charcoal-burner's cottage does he realize how tired and sore he is. And in the silence he feels for the first time the "worm" which stings him inwardly.

"Frühlingstraum"

11. "Frühlingstraum" ("Spring Dreams"): He dreams of springtime and love, but wakes to cold, darkness, and the shrieking of ravens. He sees frost leaves painted on the window. When will they turn green? "When shall I hold my beloved in my arms?"

"Einsamkeit"

12. "Einsamkeit" ("Loneliness"): He wanders, like a sad and lonely cloud, through the bright and happy Life around him. "Even when the storms were raging. I was not so miserable."

"Die Post"

13. "Die Post" ("The Post"): He hears a post horn. "Why does my heart leap up so? There's no letter for you! But maybe there's some news of her?"

"Der greise Kopf"

14. "Der greise Kopf" ("The Gray Head"): Frost has turned his hair gray and he rejoices at being an old man. But when it thaws, he is horrified to be a youth again: "How far it is still to the grave."

"Die Krähe"

15. "Die Krähe" ("The Crow"): A crow has been following him. It has never left him, expecting to take his body as its prey. "It won't be much longer now. Crow, let me finally see faithfulness into the grave!"

"Letzte Hoffnung"

16. "Letzte Hoffnung" ("Last Hope"): He gambles on a leaf quivering in the wind. If it falls from the tree, all his hopes are dashed. He falls to the ground himself and weeps over the "grave" of his hopes.

"Im Dorfe"

17. "Im Dorfe" ("In the Village"): Dogs bark, and all the people are asleep, dreaming of success and failure, finding on their pillows what eluded them in life. "I am done with all dreaming. Why should I linger among the sleepers?"

"Der stürmische Morgen"

18. "Der stürmische Morgen" ("The Stormy Morning"): The storm is an image of his heart, wild and cold like the winter.

"Täuschung"

19. "Täuschung" ("Deception"): A dancing light wants to lead him astray, and he is glad to go along. "Behind ice and night and horror" it shows him a warm, bright house and a loving wife within. "Even illusions are a boon to me!"

"Der Wegweiser"

20. "Der Wegweiser" ("The Signpost"): "Why do I take secret ways and avoid the other travelers? I've committed no crime. What foolish desire drives me to seek the wastelands?" He journeys endlessly, seeking peace and finding none. A signpost points the way: "I must travel a road where no one has ever yet returned."

"Das Wirtshaus"

21. "Das Wirtshaus" ("The Inn"): He comes to a graveyard and wants to enter. But all the rooms in this "inn" are taken; he resolves to go on his way with his faithful walking-stick.

"Mut!"

22. "Mut!" ("Have Courage!"): He shakes the snow from his face and sings cheerfully to silence his heart's stirrings, striding into the world, against wind and weather: "If there's no God on earth, then we ourselves are gods!"

"Die Nebensonnen"

23. "Die Nebensonnen" ("The Companion Suns"): He sees three suns staring at him in the sky. "You are not my suns! Once I too had three, but the best two have now set. If only the third would follow, I'll be happier in the darkness."

"Der Leiermann"

24. "Der Leiermann" ("The Hurdy-Gurdy Man"): Back of the village stands a hurdy-gurdy man, cranking his instrument with frozen fingers. His begging bowl is always empty; no one listens, and the dogs growl at him. But his playing never stops. "Strange old man. Shall I come with you? Will you play your hurdy-gurdy to accompany my songs?"

== Reworkings by others ==
- Franz Liszt transcribed 12 of the songs in the cycle for piano (S. 561), rearranging their order: 1. "Gute Nacht" (S.561/1); 4. "Erstarrung" (S.561/5); 5. "Der Lindenbaum" (S.561/7); 6. "Wasserflut" (S.561/6); 13. "Die Post" (S.561/4); 17. "Im Dorfe" (S.561/12); 18. "Der stürmische Morgen" (S.561/11); 19. "Täuschung" (S.561/9); 21. "Das Wirtshaus" (S.561/10); 22. "Mut!" (S.561/3); 23. "Die Nebensonnen" (S.561/2); and 24. "Der Leiermann" (S.561/8). He may have intended to transcribe them all. See also Transcriptions by Franz Liszt.
- Leopold Godowsky made a number of piano transcriptions of Schubert songs; the only one from Winterreise was the first song, "Gute Nacht".
- Maury Yeston based his musical-theatre song cycle, commissioned by Carnegie Hall for its Centennial, December Songs on Winterreise.
- Hans Zender orchestrated a version of the cycle in 1993, altering the music in the process.
- Jens Josef created in 2001 a version for tenor and string quartet. It was recorded by Christian Elsner and the Henschel Quartet in 2002, and performed in 2004 by Peter Schreier and the Dresdner Streichquartett.
- John Neumeier made a ballet to Winterreise on his Hamburg Ballet company in December 2001.
- Rood Adeo translated Müller's poem "Das Wirtshaus" into an English version "The Hotel", and wrote a new composition to it for piano, Wurlitzer electric piano, celesta, harmonium, and bass. It was recorded by Rood Adeo & Nighthawks at the Diner at the Wisseloord Studios in 2002, and released on the album Transit Cellophane.
- Oboist Normand Forget made a unique chamber version for accordion and wind quintet including bass clarinet, oboe d'amore and baroque horn, recorded in September 2007 by tenor Christoph Prégardien, accordionist Joseph Petric and the Montréal ensemble Pentaèdre. It was performed at the Hohenems Schubertiade, Austria 2009, and the Berlin Philharmonic Chambermusic series with the Berlin Philharmonic Wind Quintet 2013.
- The deaf actor Horst Dittrich translated the cycle of poems into Austrian Sign Language in 2007 and presented it on stage in a production of ARBOS – Company for Music and Theatre directed by Herbert Gantschacher, with Rupert Bergmann (bass-baritone) and Gert Hecher (piano), in 2008 in Vienna and Salzburg and in 2009 in Villach (Austria).
- Rick Burkhardt, Alec Duffy and Dave Malloy created an Obie award-winning theatrical adaptation of the cycle, Three Pianos, directed by Rachel Chavkin. The show played at the Ontological Theater and New York Theatre Workshop in 2010 and the American Repertory Theater in 2011.
- Matthias Loibner, inspired by "Der Leiermann", the last song of Winterreise, arranged the cycle for voice and hurdy-gurdy, and recorded it in 2010 with soprano Nataša Mirković.
- Keith Kouna's 2013 album Le voyage d'hiver was a French-language reimagining of Winterreise.
- A new version of the entire cycle for voice and accordion (2014) features indie rock singer Corn Mo and accordionist William Schimmel.
- Conal Morrison and Conor Linehan combined songs from Winterreise (translated into English by Stephen Clark) with Georg Büchner's Woyzeck in a music theatrical production Woyzeck in Winter which was produced by Landmark Productions and performed at the Galway International Arts Festival, the Barbican Centre, London, and the Dublin Theatre Festival in 2017. The cast was led by Patrick O'Kane and Camille O'Sullivan. Other leading cast members included Rosaleen Linehan, Barry McGovern and Stephen Brennan.
- Covenant, a Swedish synthpop/industrial band, released "Der Leiermann" on their 2000 single United States of Mind.
- British translator and lyricist Jeremy Sams produced an English translation that was recorded by baritone Roderick Williams and pianist Christopher Glynn in 2018.
- Composer and conductor Massimiliano Matesic made an orchestral version of the cycle, which premiered in Zurich on December 29, 2018.
- Composer Douglas J. Cuomo wrote Savage Winter, a chamber opera based on the 24 Willhelm Müller poems. Scored for male or female voice, piano, electric guitar, trumpet and electronics. It has been performed in fully staged versions at Pittsburgh Opera (2018) and the Brooklyn Academy of Music, and as semi-staged piece in numerous other venues. A recording was released in 2024 on Albany Records.

== Editions ==
Besides re-ordering Müller's songs, Schubert made a few changes to the words: verse 4 of "Erstarrung" in Müller's version read [Schubert's text bracketed]: "Mein Herz ist wie erfroren [erstorben]" ("frozen" instead of "dead"); "Irrlicht" verse 2 read "...unsre Freuden, unsre Wehen [Leiden]" ("pains" instead of "sorrows") and "Der Wegweiser" verse 3 read "Weiser stehen auf den Strassen [Wegen]" ("roads" instead of "paths"). These have all been restored in Mandyczewski's edition (the widely available Dover score) and are offered as alternative readings in Dietrich Fischer-Dieskau's revision of Max Friedlaender's edition for Peters. A few of the songs differ in the autograph and a copy with Schubert's corrections. "Wasserflut" was transposed by Schubert from F♯ minor to E minor without alteration; "Rast" moved from D minor to C minor and "Einsamkeit" from D minor to B minor, both with changes to the vocal line; "Mut" was transposed from A minor to G minor; "Der Leiermann" was transposed from B minor to A minor. The most recent scholarly edition of Winterreise is the one included as part of the Bärenreiter New Schubert Edition, edited by Walther Dürr, volume 3, which offers the songs in versions for high, medium and low voices. In this edition the key relationships are preserved: only one transposition is applied to the whole cycle.

The following table names the keys used in different editions.

Published transpositions
No.	Song	Autograph & copy	Peters edition of Friedlaendler (1884)		Schirmer
No.	Song	Autograph	Tiefere Stimme	Tiefer Alt oder Bass	Low
1	"Gute Nacht"	D minor	B♭ minor	A minor	C minor
2	"Die Wetterfahne"	A minor	F minor	D minor	F minor
3	"Gefror'ne Tränen"	F minor	D minor	B minor	D minor
4	"Erstarrung"	C minor	G minor	G minor	A minor
5	"Der Lindenbaum"	E major	D major	C major	E major
6	"Wasserflut"	F♯ minor, changed to E minor	C minor	B minor	C♯ minor
7	"Auf dem Flusse"	E minor	C minor	A minor	C minor
8	"Rückblick"	G minor	E♭ minor	D minor	E minor
9	"Irrlicht"	B minor	G minor	F minor	G minor
10	"Rast"	D minor, changed to C minor	A minor	G minor	A minor
11	"Frühlingstraum"	A major	F major	F major	G major
12	"Einsamkeit"	D minor, changed to B minor	A minor	G minor	B minor
13	"Die Post"	E♭ major	B major	G major	B♭ major
14	"Der greise Kopf"	C minor	A minor	A minor	C minor
15	"Die Krähe"	C minor	A minor	G minor	B♭ minor
16	"Letzte Hoffnung"	E♭ major	C major	B♭ major	D major
17	"Im Dorfe"	D major	C major	B♭ major	D major
18	"Der stürmische Morgen"	D minor	C minor	B minor	D minor
19	"Täuschung"	A major	G major	G major	A major
20	"Der Wegweiser"	G minor	E♭ minor	D minor	E minor
21	"Das Wirtshaus"	F major	E♭ major	D major	F major
22	"Mut"	A minor, changed to G minor	F minor	D minor	F minor
23	"Die Nebensonnen"	A major	F major	F major	A major
24	"Der Leiermann"	B minor, changed to A minor	F minor	F minor	G minor

== Enduring influence ==
Schubert's Winterreise has had a marked influence on several key works, including Gustav Mahler's Lieder eines fahrenden Gesellen and Benjamin Britten's Night-piece. In 1991, Maury Yeston composed both the original music and text of December Songs, a song cycle influenced by Winterreise, on commission from Carnegie Hall for its Centennial celebration. In 1994 Polish poet Stanisław Barańczak published his poems, entitled Podróż zimowa, which – apart from one translation of a work by Müller – were inspired by Schubert's music. 2020 Deutschlandfunk presents a new production of the Winterreise by Augst & Daemgen. In the program Atelier neuer Musik it says: "Hardly any other recording of the Winterreise cycle deals with Müller's texts and Schubert's music in such a radically different way than the reading of the composers and interpreters Oliver Augst and Marcel Daemgen. The focus of the arrangements is not the brilliantly polished beautiful sound of centuries-old traditional musical tradition, but rather its strict breakthrough in order to gain a new, undisguised access to the topicality of old texts and the core of the music."

== Recordings ==
There are numerous recordings.

- Before 1936 are the complete 1928 version of Hans Duhan with Ferdinand Foll and Lene Orthmann, the incomplete Richard Tauber version with Mischa Spoliansky, and the version of Gerhard Hüsch with Hanns Udo Müller (1933, for which an His Master's Voice limited edition subscription society was created).
- Hans Hotter first recorded the cycle in 1942 with pianist Michael Raucheisen for Deutsche Grammophon.
- There is an account by Peter Anders with Raucheisen recorded in Berlin in 1945.
- Hans Hotter's famous account with Gerald Moore was issued in May 1955. Hotter went on to make two more recordings: with Erik Werba in 1961 and a live one with Hans Dokoupil in Tokyo in 1969.
- Gérard Souzay's 1963 recording with Dalton Baldwin.
- Dietrich Fischer-Dieskau, among the most famous of exponents, is showcased in seven versions spanning four decades:
  - three with Gerald Moore (1955 His Master's Voice, 1963 His Master's Voice, and 1972 DG),
  - and one each with Jörg Demus (1966, DG), Daniel Barenboim (1980, DG), Alfred Brendel (1986, Philips) and Murray Perahia (1992, Sony Classical).
- A recording was made by Peter Pears with Benjamin Britten (issued 1965).
- Very low-pitched recordings are available by Kurt Moll with pianist Cord Garben (Orfeo, 1983), and by Martti Talvela with pianist Ralf Gothóni (BIS, 1984), and by Josef Greindl with pianist Hertha Klust (Preiser 1957), and by László Polgár with pianist Jan Schultsz (Hungaroton, 2005).
- Jon Vickers with Peter Schaaf (1983, VAI)
- Peter Schreier and Sviatoslav Richter in 1985. Two live recordings are available, one at the Semperoper in Dresden (East Germany) on February 17, and one at the Pushkin Museum in Moscow (Soviet Union) on December 10.
- Mezzo-Soprano Christa Ludwig 1986 recording with James Levine, pianist on Deutsche Grammophon.
- Olaf Bär's 1989 recording with Geoffrey Parsons on EMI classics.
- Peter Schreier with András Schiff (1994, London/Decca)
- Wolfgang Holzmair with Imogen Cooper (1996, Philips),
- Thomas Quasthoff with Charles Spencer (1998, RCA)
- Mezzo-Soprano Brigitte Fassbaender with Aribert Reimann
- Christian Gerhaher with Gerold Huber (2001, RCA Sony BMG, re-edited in 2008)
- Contralto Nathalie Stutzmann with Inger Södergren (2005, Erato)
- Thomas Quasthoff with Daniel Barenboim (2005, DGG, DVD B-0005149-09)
- Tenor Ian Bostridge with Leif Ove Andsnes (2006, EMI Classics); also, in 2000, Bostridge and pianist Julius Drake made a dramatic video recording of the entire cycle.
- Mark Padmore with Paul Lewis (2009, Harmonia Mundi)
- Werner Güra with Christoph Berner playing a Rönisch fortepiano of 1872 (2010, Harmonia Mundi)
- Mark Padmore with Kristian Bezuidenhout (2018, Harmonia Mundi)
- Andrè Schuen with Daniel Heide (2024, DG)

Some videotaped performances are also available, including mezzo-soprano Christa Ludwig with Charles Spencer (1994, Art Haus Musik), several by Fischer-Dieskau, one by Hermann Prey with pianist Helmut Deutsch, and a version by Thomas Quasthoff and pianist Daniel Barenboim filmed at the Berlin Philharmonie in 2005. Francisco Araiza tenor and Jean Lemaire (2014 Arthaus) coupled with Schumann's Dichterliebe; studio recording.
