= Blüthner =

German piano manufacturer

Julius Blüthner Pianofortefabrik GmbH
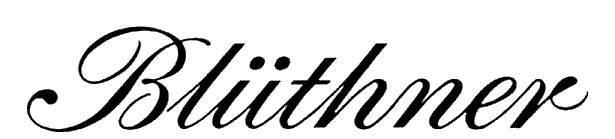
- Company type: Private
- Industry: Musical instruments
- Founded: 1853
- Founder: Julius Blüthner
- Headquarters: Großpösna near Leipzig, Germany
- Key people: Dr. Christian Blüthner-Haessler (CEO)
- Products: Grand pianos and upright pianos
- Website: bluethnerworld.com

Julius Blüthner Pianofortefabrik GmbH is a piano-manufacturing company in Leipzig, Germany. Composers who used Blüthner include Brahms, Debussy, Wagner, Strauss, Tchaikovsky, Rachmaninoff, and the Beatles among others.

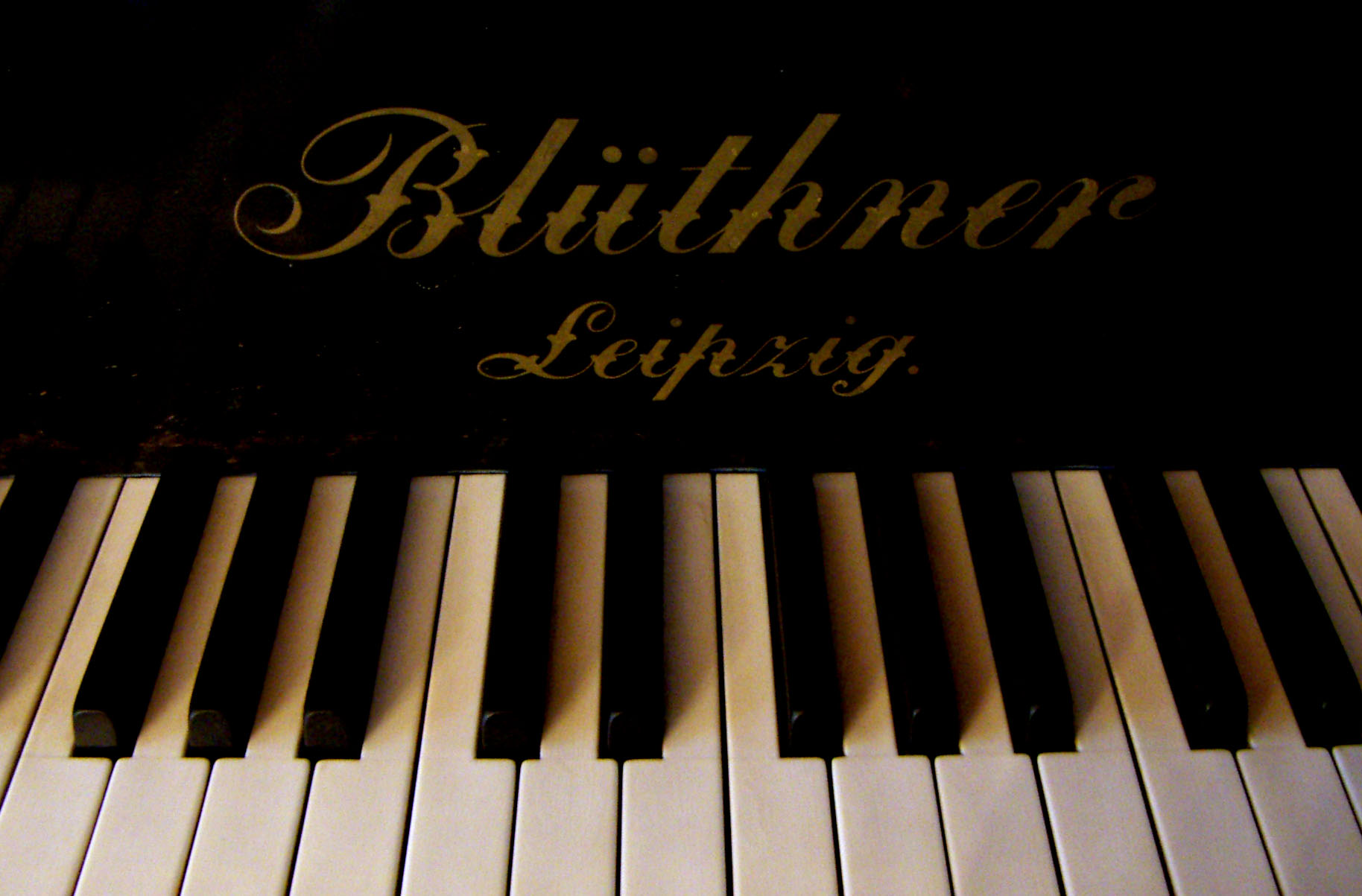
Blüthner

== History ==
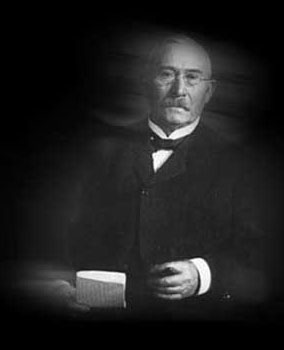
The founder Julius Blüthner

After a long and difficult campaign to gain Leipzig citizenship, Julius Blüthner established his workshop in Leipzig, Saxony in 1853. In the beginning he employed three other craftsmen.

By 1900 Blüthner had become the largest piano maker in Germany, producing some 5,000 instruments annually. Innovations such as the aliquot string (an additional string on high treble notes that improves their tone by vibrating sympathetically), as well as a cylindrical soundboard and angle cut hammers, created a unique voice for the Blüthner instrument.

The owners in 1917 (Adolf Max Blüthner, Dr. Paul Robert and Willy Bruno Heinrich) were awarded an imperial and royal warrant of appointment to the court of Austria-Hungary.

In 1936, Blüthner was selected to build the piano for the airship Hindenburg.

In 1943, during World War II, an air raid destroyed the Blüthner factory.

After the war, Dr. Rudolf Blüthner-Haessler rebuilt the company; production of pianos resumed in 1948.

In 1972, the company was nationalized by the East German government, with Ingbert Blüthner-Haessler remaining as managing director.

With the Fall of the Berlin Wall in 1989 and German reunification in 1990, the Blüthner family regained control of the company. Ingbert Blüthner-Haessler reorganized the company, increasing the production capacity and modernizing the manufacturing process.

Between 1994 and 1997 a new factory was built in Störmthal near Leipzig.

Beginning in 1995, Ingbert Blüthner-Haessler shared the management of the company with his two sons, Christian Blüthner-Haessler and Knut Blüthner-Haessler.

In 2009, the Karl Rönisch piano company merged with Blüthner, and Karl Rönisch production was moved to Blüthner's factory in Leipzig.

The age of any particular Blüthner piano can be determined by matching its serial number to the age table freely available on the Blüthner website.

Recordings made with instruments by Blüthner

- Yury Martynov. Beethoven-Liszt. Symphonies Nos. 3 & 8. Label: Zig-Zag Territoires. Played on a Blüthner piano from about 1867.
- Yury Martynov. Beethoven-Liszt. Symphonies Nos. 4-5. Label: Zig-Zag Territoires. Played on a Blüthner piano from about 1867.
- Yury Martynov. Beethoven-Liszt. Symphony No. 9. Label: Zig-Zag Territoires. Played on a Blüthner piano from about 1867.
- Alec Frank-Gemmill, Alasdair Beatson. Beethoven, Schumann, Franz Joseph Strauss, Rossini, Saint-Saëns, Glazunov, Gilbert Vinter. A Noble and Melancholy Instrument. Label: BIS. Played on pianos by Salvatore Lagrassa (about 1815), Streicher (1847), Blüthner (1867), and Bechstein (1898).
- Ragna Schirmer. Clara Schumann, Robert Schumann, Johannes Brahms. Love in Variations. Label: Berlin Classics. Played on a Julius Blüthner piano from 1856.
- Primrose Piano Quartet. Johannes Brahms. The Piano Quartets. Label: Meridian Records. Played on pianos by Rönisch, Blüthner and Streicher.
- Franziska Hirzel, Tobias Schabenberger. Zumsteeg, Loewe, Raff, Schumann, Elgar, Parker, Wagner. Lieder der Maria Stuart. Label: Bonitz Music Network. Played on a Blüthner piano from 1874.
- Alain Planès. Claude Debussy. Children's Corner, Suite Bergamasque. Label: Harmonia Mundi. Played on a Blüthner piano from 1902.
- Randall Love. Claude Debussy. Preludes, Books 1 & 2. Label: Centaur. Played on a Blüthner piano from 1907.
- Randall Love. Le Tombeau de Debussy. Label: Centaur. Played on a Blüthner piano from 1907.

== Current grand piano models ==
Model	Length
1	280 centimetres (9 ft 2 in)
2	238 centimetres (7 ft 10 in)
4	210 centimetres (6 ft 11 in)
6	190 centimetres (6 ft 3 in)
10	166 centimetres (5 ft 5 in)
11	154 centimetres (5 ft 1 in)

== Current upright piano models ==
Model	Height
S	145 cm (57.3”)
B	132 cm (52.2”)
A	124 cm (49”)
C	118 cm (46.2”)
D	116 cm (45.7”)

== Discontinued piano models ==
List of discontinued piano models:

Model	Length
Style IV	150 centimetres (4 ft 11 in)
Style IVa	165 centimetres (5 ft 5 in)
Style V	175 centimetres (5 ft 9 in)
Style VI (Aliquot)	175 centimetres (5 ft 9 in)
Style VII	190 centimetres (6 ft 3 in)
Style VIII (Aliquot)	190 centimetres (6 ft 3 in)
Style IX	200 cm – 211 centimetres (6 ft 11 in) – 6'11")
Style X	234 centimetres (7 ft 8 in)
Style XI	274 cm (9')
Style XII	190 centimetres (6 ft 3 in)

== Designer models ==
The one-of-a-kind Blüthner piano of particular interest was a special lightweight instrument, made for use on the Zeppelin LZ 129 Hindenburg. The piano had its harp plate made of aluminum, that saved about 100 kg of weight versus a regular cast iron plate of the same size piano. This was the first piano used in flight, and it was used in an "air-concert" radio broadcast. It was removed in 1937 to save weight so it survived the Hindenburg's infamous crash, only to be destroyed by bombing during WWII. A replica of this piano was featured in the 1975 film The Hindenburg where Reed Channing (Peter Donat) sings. Since the film is set during the airship's final flight, during which the piano was not on the ship, the piano's presence is a historical error.

Blüthner makes a few specialized pianos including some with the design reversed so that a left-handed person can play the tenor with his left hand and the bass with his right hand. In 2008 they designed and built a special keyboard for a customer in Spain which had the Jankó keyboard design.

== Brands ==
In addition to the Blüthner brand, Blüthner manufactures two other brands: Haessler for the mid-level market and Irmler for the entry-level market.

=== Haessler ===
Made for the mid-level piano market, Haessler pianos are designed and built in the same factory as Bluthner pianos.

=== Irmler ===
Made for the entry-level piano market, Irmler pianos are designed by Blüthner and manufactured in different countries. The Studio Edition pianos are manufactured in China and shipped to Germany were they receive Abel hammers. Professional Edition pianos use structural and acoustical elements from the Samick factory in Indonesia and cabinets from Poland and then are assembled in Germany.

== Notable Blüthner artists ==
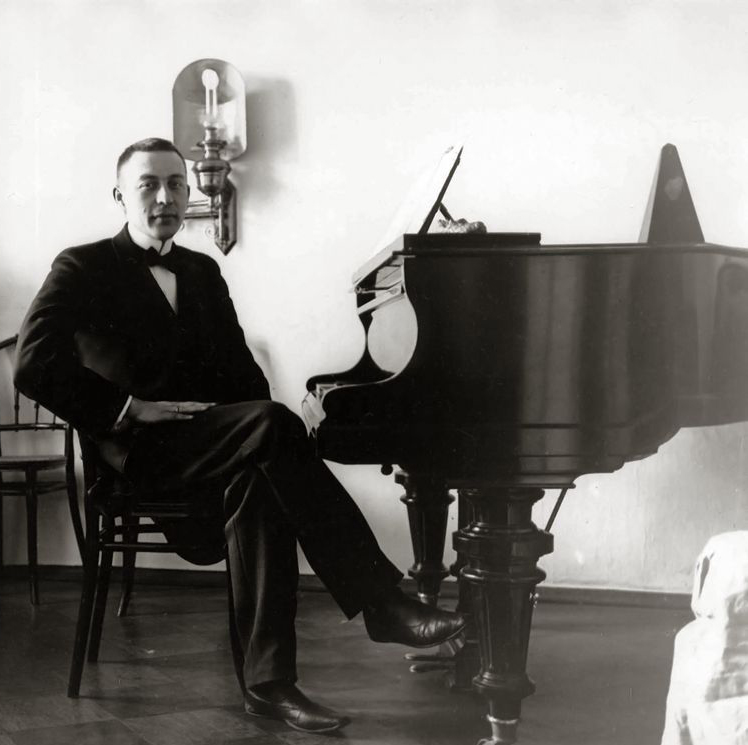
Sergei Rachmaninoff with a Blüthner piano. Photo ca. 1905

Numerous royals, composers, conductors, artists, authors and performers have owned Blüthner pianos. They include Willhelm II, Emperor Franz Joseph I, Johannes Brahms, Gustav Mahler, Liberace, Béla Bartók, Claude Debussy, George Formby, Dodie Smith, Max Reger, Richard Wagner, Johann Strauss, Pyotr Ilyich Tchaikovsky, Dmitri Shostakovich, Petronel Malan. Sergei Rachmaninoff commented that "There are only two things which I took with me on my way to America...my wife and my precious Blüthner".

Blüthners have been used in popular music, as well. One Blüthner piano owned by the Abbey Road Studios in London was used on some tracks of The Beatles' Let It Be (1970) album, most notably, in the hits "Let It Be" and "The Long and Winding Road". Blüthners were also used in the films Gaslight (1944) and The Sting (1973), and one was played by Hannibal Lecter in the movie Hannibal. Another, a stunt piano, was destroyed in Iron Man (2008). A Blüthner piano also appears in the 2004 Cole Porter biopic De-Lovely in the Venice apartment scenes.
