= Lobe den Herrn, meine Seele, BWV 69a =

Church cantata by Johann Sebastian Bach

Lobe den Herrn, meine Seele
- Church cantata by J. S. Bach
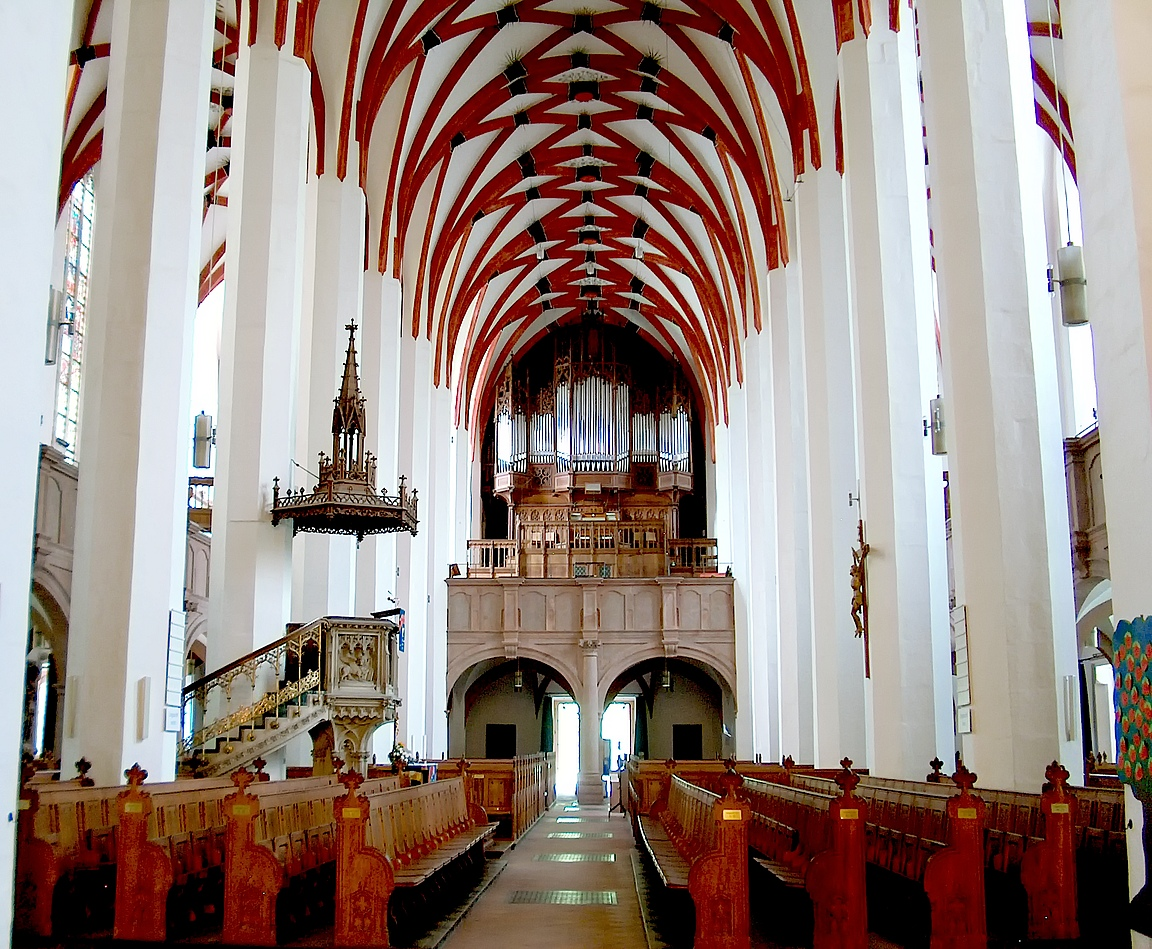
- Thomaskirche, Leipzig
- Catalogue: BWV 69a; BWV 69.1
- Related: basis for BWV 69 (= BWV 69.2)
- Occasion: Twelfth Sunday after Trinity
- Cantata text: anonymous
- Bible text: Psalms 103:2
- Chorale: "Was Gott tut, das ist wohlgetan"
- Performed: 15 August 1723: Leipzig
- Movements: six
- Vocal: SATB choir and solo
- Instrumental: 3 trumpets; timpani; 3 oboes; oboe da caccia; oboe d'amore; recorder; bassoon; 2 violins; viola; continuo

Johann Sebastian Bach composed the church cantata Lobe den Herrn, meine Seele (Praise the Lord, my soul), BWV 69a, also BWV 69.1, in Leipzig for the twelfth Sunday after Trinity and first performed it on 15 August 1723. It is part of his first cantata cycle.

== History and words ==
Bach wrote the cantata in his first year in Leipzig, which he had started after Trinity of 1723, for the Twelfth Sunday after Trinity. The prescribed readings for the Sunday were from the Second Epistle to the Corinthians, the ministry of the Spirit (2 Corinthians 3:4–11), and from the Gospel of Mark, the healing of a deaf mute man (Mark 7:31–37). The unknown poet referred to the gospel, but saw God constantly doing good for man in the healing more generally. The opening chorus is therefore taken from Psalm 103:2, "Praise the Lord, my soul, and do not forget the good He has done for you". The poetry refers to "telling" several times, related to the healed man's ability to speak: "Ah, that I had a thousand tongues!" (movement 2), "My soul, arise! tell" (movement 3) and "My mouth is weak, my tongue mute to speak Your praise and honor" (movement 4). Several movements rely on words of a cantata by Johann Oswald Knauer, published in 1720 in Gott-geheiligtes Singen und Spielen des Friedensteinischen Zions in Gotha. The closing chorale picks up the theme in the sixth verse of Samuel Rodigast's hymn "Was Gott tut, das ist wohlgetan" (What God does, is done well) (1675).

Bach first performed the cantata on 15 August 1723. He performed it again around 1727, revised the instrumentation of an aria, and used it in his last years for a cantata for a Ratswahl ceremony, the inauguration of the town council at church, Lobe den Herrn, meine Seele, BWV 69.2.

== Scoring and structure ==
To express the praise of the words, the cantata is festively scored for soprano, alto, tenor and bass soloists, a four-part choir, and a Baroque instrumental ensemble of three trumpets, timpani, three oboes, oboe da caccia, oboe d'amore, recorder, bassoon, two violins, viola, and basso continuo.

The cantata is in six movements:

1. Chorus: Lobe den Herrn, meine Seele
2. Recitative (soprano): Ach, daß ich tausend Zungen hätte!
3. Aria (tenor): Meine Seele, auf, erzähle
4. Recitative (alto): Gedenk ich nur zurück
5. Aria (bass): Mein Erlöser und Erhalter
6. Chorale: Was Gott tut, das ist wohlgetan, darbei will ich verbleiben

== Music ==
Bach reflected the duality within the words of the psalm in the opening chorus by creating a double fugue. Both themes of the movement in D Major are handled separately and then combined. In the first aria, a pastoral movement, the tenor is accompanied by oboe da caccia, recorder and bassoon. In a later version, around 1727, Bach changed the instrumentation to alto, oboe and violin, possibly because he did not have players at hand for the first woodwind setting. In the second aria the contrast of Leiden (suffering) and Freuden (joy) is expressed by chromatic, first down, then up, and vivid coloraturas. The closing hymn is the same as the one of Weinen, Klagen, Sorgen, Zagen, BWV 12, of 1714, but for no apparent reason without the obbligato violin.

== Recordings ==
- J. S. Bach: Das Kantatenwerk – Sacred Cantatas Vol. 4, Nikolaus Harnoncourt, Tölzer Knabenchor, Concentus Musicus Wien, soloist of the Tölzer Knabenchor, Paul Esswood, Kurt Equiluz, Ruud van der Meer, Teldec 1977
- J. S. Bach: Complete Cantatas Vol. 6, Ton Koopman, Amsterdam Baroque Orchestra & Choir, Ruth Ziesak, Elisabeth von Magnus, Paul Agnew, Klaus Mertens, Antoine Marchand 1997
- J. S. Bach: Cantatas Vol. 13, Masaaki Suzuki, Bach Collegium Japan, Yoshie Hida, Kirsten Sollek-Avella, Makoto Sakurada, Peter Kooy, BIS 1999
- Edition Bachakademie Vol. 140 – Sacred Vocal Works, Helmuth Rilling, Gächinger Kantorei, Bach-Collegium Stuttgart, Sibylla Rubens, Anke Vondung, Marcus Ullmann, Hänssler 1999
- Bach Cantatas Vol. 6, John Eliot Gardiner, Monteverdi Choir, English Baroque Soloists, Katharine Fuge, Robin Tyson, Christoph Genz, Peter Harvey, Soli Deo Gloria [2000]

== Sources ==
- Lobe den Herrn, meine Seele, BWV 69a: Scores at the International Music Score Library Project
- Cantata BWV 69a Lobe den Herrn, meine Seele: history, scoring, sources for text and music, translations to various languages, discography, discussion, Bach Cantatas Website
- Chapter 15 BWV 69a Lobe den Herrn, meine Seele / Bless the Lord, my soul. Julian Mincham, 2010
- Luke Dahn: BWV 69a.6 bach-chorales.com
