= Jan Kobow =

German classical tenor (born 1966)

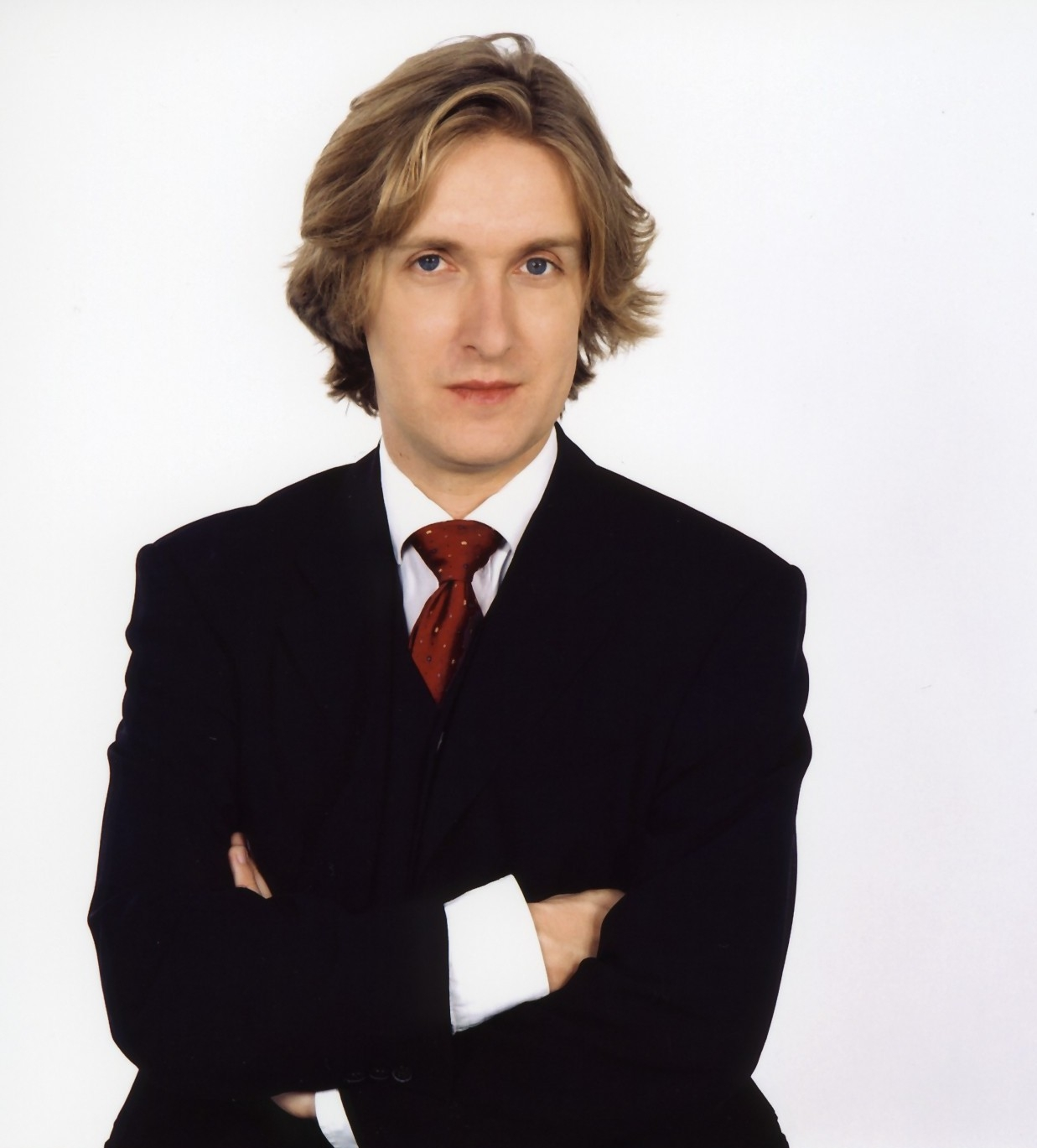
- Born: 1966; West Berlin, West Germany
- Education: Hochschule für Musik und Theater Hannover; Hochschule für Musik und Theater Hamburg
- Occupation: Classical tenor
- Organization: Himlische Cantorey

Jan Kobow (born 1966) is a German classical tenor in concert, Lied, and Baroque opera.

== Professional career ==
Jan Kobow was born and raised in Berlin. He was a singer and soloist of the Staats- und Domchor, Berlin with Christian Grube. He studied the organ at the Schola Cantorum in Paris and graduated in church music at the Hochschule für Musik und Theater Hannover in 1994. He continued to study singing at the Hochschule für Musik und Theater Hamburg with Sabine Kirchner, graduating in 1999.

In the field of historically informed performance he has worked with Nikolaus Harnoncourt and took part in the Bach Cantata Pilgrimage of John Eliot Gardiner and the Monteverdi Choir. In 2002, he recorded several cantatas for Pentecost of Gottfried Heinrich Stölzel, conducted by Ludger Rémy, with one voice per part, the four soloists forming the choir. In 2003 he recorded Bach cantatas with Philippe Herreweghe and the Collegium Vocale Gent, Johannette Zomer, Ingeborg Danz and Peter Kooy, including Ach Gott, vom Himmel sieh darein, BWV 2, written for the second Sunday after Trinity of 1724. In 2007, he recorded more Bach cantatas with Herreweghe, Dorothee Mields, Matthew White and Peter Kooy. In 2007, he performed with Herreweghe the tenor arias of Bach's St John Passion in Alice Tully Hall. In 2008, he sang the part of the Evangelist in an arrangement of this passion by Robert Schumann. A review states: "Jan Kobow's rendition of the evangelist's role is brilliant—compellingly dramatic and wonderfully fluent, and the ease of his high range is remarkable."

He has performed Baroque opera, such as in 2004 the part of Telemaco in Monteverdi's Il ritorno d'Ulisse in patria at the Theatre Royal de la Monnaie in a production also presented at Lincoln Center in New York, in Caen and in Luxembourg. In 2007, he sang the title role of this opera in concert performances with Les Talens Lyriques, directed by Christophe Rousset.

He has performed and recorded Lieder of the period of Romanticism accompanied on period instruments. He sang Schubert's Die schöne Müllerin and Schwanengesang with Kristian Bezuidenhout (fortepiano), Lieder of Siegmund von Seckendorff on words of Goethe with Ludger Rémy (pianoforte), and Lieder and Ballads of Carl Loewe with Cord Garben. In 2010 Kobow took part in the project Robert Schumann: Sammlung von Musik-Stücken alter und neuer Zeit, which was initiated by Radio Bremen and resulted in a series of broadcasts and CDs. Artists such as Veronika Winter and Andreas Pruys performed the 70 compositions which Schumann had added to the Neue Zeitschrift für Musik from 1838 to 1841.

Kobow co-founded the ensemble Himlische Cantorey, performing works of Claudio Monteverdi and John Dowland, among others.

== Awards ==
- 1998: First prize at the 11th International Bach Competition of Leipzig
- 2004: Luitpold Prize (German: Luitpoldpreis) of the festival Kissinger Sommer

== Selected recordings ==
- Johann Sebastian Bach: Christmas Oratorio, Elisabeth Scholl, Gerhild Romberger, Sebastian Noack, Knabenchor Hannover, Barockorchester L'Arco, conductor Heinz Hennig, Studio Wedemark 1999
- Georg Friedrich Telemann: Der Tod Jesu, Dorothee Mields, Britta Schwarz, Klaus Mertens, Michaelstein Telemann Chamber Orchestra, Magdeburg Chamber Choir, conductor Ludger Rémy, cpo 2000
- Johann Pachelbel: Arien & Concerti, Emma Kirkby, Kai Wessel, Klaus Mertens, London Baroque, 2007, Cavalli Records review Steven Plank in Opera Today
- J.S. Bach: Johannes-Passion BWV 245 BWV 245, Philippe Herreweghe, Collegium Vocale Gent, Christoph Prégardien (Evangelist), Konrad Jarnot (Vox Christi), Camilla Tilling, Ingeborg Danz, Jan Kobow, Peter Kooy 2007
- Bach: Mass in B minor, Frans Brüggen, Cappella Amsterdam, Orchestra of the Eighteenth Century, Dorothee Mields, Johannette Zomer, Patrick Van Goethem, Frans Fiselier, Rapidshare 2009
- Telemann and the Leipzig Opera: popular arias from the collection Musicalische Rüstkammer. Includes opera arias by Georg Philipp Telemann, Melchior Hoffmann, Reinhard Keiser and Johann David Heinichen performed by Jan Kobow and United Continuo Ensemble. Heidelberg, Germany: MusiContact, ℗2011. Pan Classics PC 10237

== Trivia ==
He spent the 1983-1984 school year as an exchange student in Ithaca, New York and starred as Joseph in Ithaca High School's production of Joseph and the Amazing Technicolor Dreamcoat.
