= Ruth Ziesak =

German soprano in opera and concert (born 1963)

- Born: 9 February 1963 (age 62); Hofheim, Hesse, West Germany
- Education: Frankfurt University of Music and Performing Arts
- Occupations: Classical soprano; Academic teacher
- Organization: Hochschule für Musik Saar
- Website: www.ruthziesak.de

Ruth Ziesak (born 9 February 1963) is a German soprano in opera and concert.

== Career ==
Ruth Ziesak studied voice at the Frankfurt University of Music and Performing Arts with Elsa Cavelti and Christoph Prégardien. She has been a member of the Municipal Theatre Heidelberg since 1988 and the Deutsche Oper am Rhein in 1990.

She appeared in roles of Mozart's operas, such as Pamina in The Magic Flute (at the Salzburg Festival 1991 and recorded with Georg Solti), Servilia in La clemenza di Tito (recorded with Nikolaus Harnoncourt) or the Countess in Le nozze di Figaro in Glyndebourne and with the Zurich Opera.

In concert she appeared and recorded with the Berliner Barock-Compagney and took part in the project of Ton Koopman to record the complete vocal works of Johann Sebastian Bach with the Amsterdam Baroque Orchestra & Choir. In 2011 she performed the Liebesliederwalzer of Brahms and Spanische Liebeslieder op. 138 of Schumann with Anke Vondung, Werner Güra and Konrad Jarnot at the Rheingau Musik Festival at Schloss Johannisberg.

As a Lieder singer she gave recitals at the festivals Kissinger Sommer and Heidelberger Frühling in collaboration with the pianists Gerold Huber and András Schiff.

She is on the faculty of the Hochschule für Musik Saar.

== Recordings ==
- Joseph Haydn: Canzonetten, Gerold Huber, piano, Capriccio
