= Ingeborg Danz =

German singer

- Born: 1961 (age 63–64); Witten
- Education: Hochschule für Musik Detmold
- Occupation: Classical mezzo-soprano

Ingeborg Danz (born 1961 in Witten) is a German mezzo-soprano and alto concert singer.

== Career ==
Danz studied school music at the Hochschule für Musik Detmold and voice with Heiner Eckels. She took advanced classes with Elisabeth Schwarzkopf, among others. Danz has been teaching master classes at the Musikfest of the Internationale Bachakademie Stuttgart.

She appeared as a guest artist on the opera stage, such as Hamburg State Opera, but is mostly dedicated to concert singing, collaborating with Helmuth Rilling and Philippe Herreweghe. Danz has performed Lieder, with pianist Almut Eckels since 1984, touring with the singers Juliane Banse, Christoph Prégardien and Olaf Bär. With Olaf Bär, she appeared at the Rheingau Musik Festival.

== Recordings ==
Danz recorded with Rilling and his Gächinger Kantorei not only the great oratorios and cantatas of Bach, Mozart's Requiem and Mendelssohn's Elijah but also the Requiem of Reconciliation.

- J.S. Bach: Johannes-Passion BWV 245 BWV 245, Philippe Herreweghe, Collegium Vocale Gent, Christoph Prégardien (Evangelist), Konrad Jarnot (Vox Christi), Camilla Tilling, Ingeborg Danz, Jan Kobow, Peter Kooy 2007
- Felix Draeseke Lieder – Cord Garben, piano; CPO.
