= Sympathetic resonance =

Harmonic phenomenon in music

Sympathetic resonance or sympathetic vibration is a harmonic phenomenon wherein a passive string or vibratory body responds to external vibrations to which it has a harmonic likeness. The classic example is demonstrated with two similarly-tuned tuning forks. When one fork is struck and held near the other, vibrations are induced in the unstruck fork, even though there is no physical contact between them. In similar fashion, strings will respond to the vibrations of a tuning fork when sufficient harmonic relations exist between them. The effect is most noticeable when the two bodies are tuned in unison or an octave apart (corresponding to the first and second harmonics, integer multiples of the inducing frequency), as there is the greatest similarity in vibrational frequency. Sympathetic resonance is an example of injection locking occurring between coupled oscillators, in this case coupled through vibrating air. In musical instruments, sympathetic resonance can produce both desirable and undesirable effects.

According to The New Grove Dictionary of Music and Musicians:

The property of sympathetic vibration is encountered in its direct form in room acoustics in the rattling of window panes, light shades and movable panels in the presence of very loud sounds, such as may occasionally be produced by a full organ. As these things rattle (or even if they do not audibly rattle) sound energy is being converted into mechanical energy, and so the sound is absorbed. Wood paneling and anything else that is lightweight and relatively unrestrained have the same effect. Absorptivity is at its highest at the resonance frequency, usually near or below 100 Hz.

== Sympathetic resonance in music instruments ==
Sympathetic resonance has been applied to musical instruments from many cultures and time periods, and to string instruments in particular. In instruments with undamped strings (e.g. harps, guitars and kotos), strings will resonate at their fundamental or overtone frequencies when other nearby strings are sounded. For example, an A string at 440 Hz will cause an E string at 330 Hz to resonate, because they share an overtone of 1320 Hz (the third harmonic of A and fourth harmonic of E). Sympathetic resonance is a factor in the timbre of a string instrument.

Certain instruments are built with sympathetic strings, auxiliary strings which are not directly played but sympathetically produce sound in response to tones played on the main strings. Sympathetic strings can be found on Indian musical instruments such as the sitar, Western Baroque instruments such as the viola d'amore and folk instruments such as the hurdy-gurdy and Hardanger fiddle. Some pianos are built with sympathetic strings, a practice known as aliquot stringing. Sympathetic resonance is sometimes an unwanted effect that must be mitigated when designing an instrument. For example, to dampen resonance in the headstock, some electric guitars use string trees near their tuning pegs. Similarly, the string length behind the bridge must be made as short as possible to dampen resonance.

=== Piano Sustain ===
When the sustain pedal is pressed on a piano, sympathetic resonance occurs, becoming more noticeable as more notes (nearby in frequency values) are played while the pedal is held active (pressed down). This resonance causes a "muddying" of sound when the sustain pedal is held too long, blurring the sound from crisp audible note endings to a sort of inseparable watercolor of mixed sound.

For example, pressing one key on a piano with the sustain pedal pressed causes multiple harmonic notes to gradually and spontaneously "appear" to the listener, though the harmonics are often far quieter than the original note's strength. Arbitrarily assuming that playing a single note on a piano will cause 4 more harmonics to play, continuing to press 9 more keys (with the sustain pedal held down throughout the duration of playing) would cause up to 10 $\times$ ~5 = ~ 50 notes to become audible to the player, rather than just the 10 directly played notes.
