= Aliquot stringing =

Use of additional unstruck strings in a piano to enrich the tone

Aliquot stringing is the use of extra, un-struck strings in a piano for the purpose of enriching the tone. Aliquot systems use an additional (hence fourth) string in each note of the top three piano octaves. This string is positioned slightly above the other three strings so that it is not struck by the hammer. Whenever the hammer strikes the three conventional strings, the aliquot string vibrates sympathetically. Aliquot stringing broadens the vibrational energy throughout the instrument, and creates an unusually complex and colorful tone.

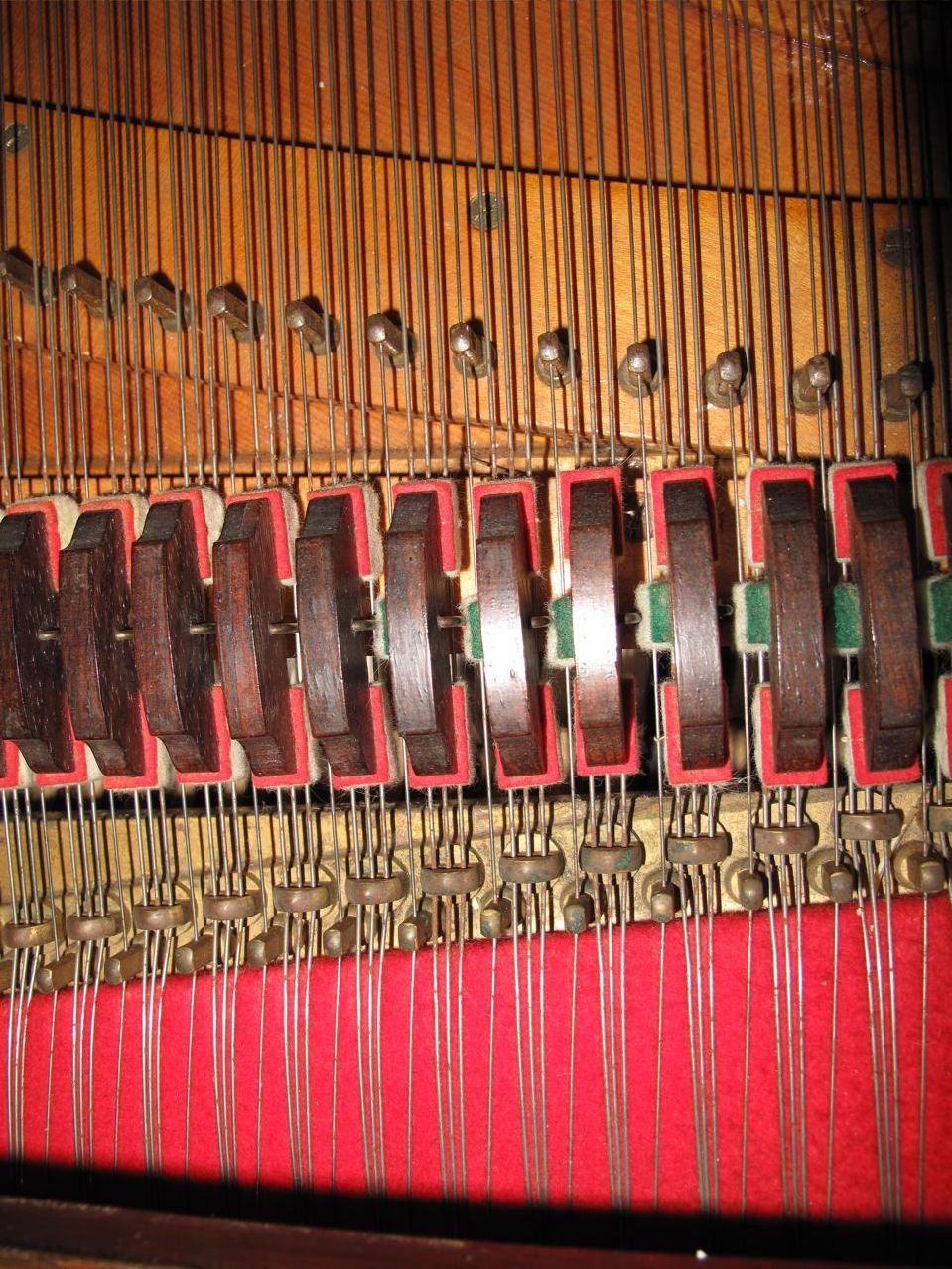
The aliquot strings are one octave higher and are therefore shorter.

== Etymology ==
The word aliquot ultimately comes from a Latin word meaning 'some, several'. In mathematics, aliquot means 'an exact part or divisor', reflecting the fact that the length of an aliquot string forms an exact division of the length of longer strings with which it vibrates sympathetically.

== History ==
Julius Blüthner invented the aliquot stringing system in 1873. The Blüthner aliquot system uses an additional (hence fourth) string in each note of the top three piano octaves. This string is positioned slightly above the other three strings so that it is not struck by the hammer. Whenever the hammer strikes the three conventional strings, the aliquot string vibrates sympathetically. This string resonance also occurs when other notes are played that are harmonically related to the pitch of an aliquot string, though only when the related notes' dampers are raised. Many piano-makers enrich the tone of the piano through sympathetic vibration, but use a different method known as duplex scaling (see piano). Confusingly, the portions of the strings used in duplex scaling are sometimes called "aliquot strings", and the contact points used in duplex scales are called aliquots. Aliquot stringing and the duplex scale, even if they use "aliquots", are not equivalent.

Because they are tuned an octave above their constituent pitch, true aliquot strings transmit strong vibrations to the soundboard. Duplex scaling, which typically is tuned a double octave or more above the speaking length, does not. And because aliquot strings are so active, they require dampers or they would sustain uncontrollably and muddy the sound. Aliquot stringing broadens the vibrational energy throughout the instrument, and creates an unusually complex and colorful tone. This results from hammers striking their respective three strings, followed by an immediate transfer of energy into their sympathetic strings. The noted piano authority Larry Fine observes that the Blüthner tone is "refined" and "delicate", particularly "at a low level of volume". The Blüthner company, however, claims that the effect of aliquot stringing is equally apparent in loud playing.

=== Tunable aliquots ===
Theodore Steinway of Steinway & Sons patented tunable aliquots in 1872. Short lengths of non-speaking wire were bridged by an aliquot throughout much of the upper range of the piano, always in locations that caused them to vibrate in conformity with their respective overtones—typically in doubled octaves and twelfths. This enhanced the power and sustain of the instrument's treble. Because it was time-consuming to correctly position each aliquot, Steinway abandoned individual aliquots for continuous cast-metal bars, each comprising an entire section of duplex bridge points. The company trusted that with an accurately templated bridge and carefully located duplex bar, the same result would be achieved with less fuss.

Mason & Hamlin, established in Boston in 1854, continued to use individual aliquots. They felt that the tuning of these short lengths of string was more accurate with an aliquot than what could be attained with a duplex bar. With the fixed points of a duplex bar, small variations in casting or bridge-pin positioning are liable to produce imperfections in the duplex string lengths. Furthermore, since variations in humidity can cause duplex scales to move in pitch more rapidly than the speaking scale, readjustments of aliquot positioning is more feasible than duplex bar re-positioning.

A modern piano manufacturer, Fazioli (Sacile, Italy), has blended Steinway's original ideas by creating a stainless-steel track, fixed to the cast-iron plate, on which individual aliquots slide.

== Other musical instruments ==
Makers of other string instruments sometimes use aliquot parts of the scale length to enhance the timbre. Examples of such instruments include the viola d'amore, Hardanger fiddle, and the sitar.
