= Aliquot =

Aliquot (Latin: a few, some, not many) may refer to:

== Mathematics ==
- Aliquot part, a proper divisor of an integer
- Aliquot sum, the sum of the aliquot parts of an integer
- Aliquot sequence, a sequence of integers in which each number is the aliquot sum of the previous number

== Music ==
- Aliquot stringing, in stringed instruments, the use of strings which are not struck to make a note, but which resonate sympathetically with struck notes
- Aliquot stop, an organ stop that adds harmonics or overtones instead of the primary pitch

== Sciences ==
- Aliquot of a sample, in chemistry and other sciences, a precise portion of a sample or total amount of a liquid (e.g. precisely 25 mL of water taken from 250 mL)
- Aliquot in pharmaceutics, a method of measuring ingredients below the sensitivity of a scale by proportional dilution with inactive known ingredients
- Genome aliquoting, the problem of reconstructing an ancestral genome from the genomes of polyploid descendants

== Other uses ==
- Aliquot part, in the US Public Land Survey System, a subdivision of a section based upon an even division by distances along the edges and not by equal area
