= Camilla Tilling =

Swedish soprano in opera and concert (born 1971)

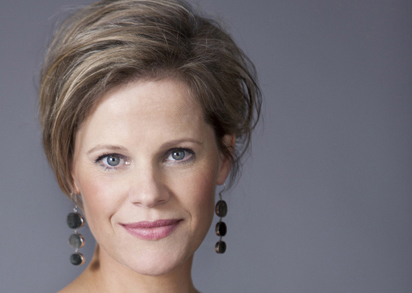
- Tilling in 2011
- Born: Camilla Viktoria Rydh; May 18, 1971; Linköping, Östergötland County, Sweden
- Education: Royal College of Music
- Occupation: Classical soprano

Camilla Viktoria Rydh (born 1971), best known as Camilla Tilling, is a Swedish soprano in opera and concert.

== Professional career ==
Camilla Viktoria Rydh was born in Linköping, Östergötland County, Sweden. She studied at the Högskolan för scen och musik in Göteborg (1997–98) and at the Royal College of Music in London, where she graduated in 1998.

Her opera debut was the role of Olympia in Offenbach's The Tales of Hoffmann in Göteborg in 1997. At the New York City Opera she appeared as Corinna in Rossini's Il viaggio a Reims, in 2002 at Covent Garden as Sophie in Der Rosenkavalier of Richard Strauss, conducted by Simone Young, at the Aix-en-Provence Festival as Susanna with Marc Minkowski, at the Glyndebourne Festival in Peter Grimes with Marc Wigglesworth, at La Monnaie as Sophie with Antonio Pappano, at the Metropolitan Opera as Nanetta in Verdi's Falstaff with James Levine, and at the Drottningholm Festival as Pamina in Mozart's The Magic Flute with Arnold Oestman. In 2003 she sang at Covent Garden the role of Dorinda in Handel's Orlando, with Bejun Mehta in the title role, conducted by Charles Mackerras. She recorded Purcell's Dido and Aeneas with Susan Graham and Ian Bostridge, conducted by Emmanuelle Haïm. Her debut at La Scala in 2005 was Ilia in Mozart's Idomeneo. In 2008 she appeared on a DVD of Messian's Saint François d'Assise in the part of the Angel, with Rodney Gilfry as St. Francis, conducted by Ingo Metzmacher, recorded live in Amsterdam.

In concert, she sang Haydn's The Creation with the Los Angeles Philharmonic and Esa-Pekka Salonen, Haydn's The Seasons with John Eliot Gardiner, Bach's St Matthew Passion with the Mahler Chamber Orchestra and Daniel Harding, Mendelssohn's Elijah with the Concertgebouw Orchestra and Philippe Herreweghe, Mozart's Great Mass in C minor with the San Francisco Symphony, A German Requiem of Brahms with Ivor Bolton, and Handel's Messiah with the Berliner Philharmoniker and William Christie. She was a soloist in Mahler's Resurrection Symphony in the opening concert of the Rheingau Musik Festival 2010, conducted by Paavo Järvi in Eberbach Abbey.

Her first solo recording is Rote Rosen, Lieder by Richard Strauss, accompanied by Paul Rivinius, was released in 2009.

== Recordings ==
- J.S. Bach: Johannes-Passion BWV 245 BWV 245, Philippe Herreweghe, Collegium Vocale Gent, Christoph Prégardien (Evangelist), Konrad Jarnot, Camilla Tilling, Ingeborg Danz, Jan Kobow, Peter Kooy 2007; Mozart's Great Mass in c minor K.427 [Paul McCreesh][Gabrieli Consort] 2005.
