= Lobe den Herrn, meine Seele, BWV 69 =

Church cantata by Johann Sebastian Bach

Lobe den Herrn, meine Seele, BWV 69 (69.2)
- Sacred cantata by J. S. Bach
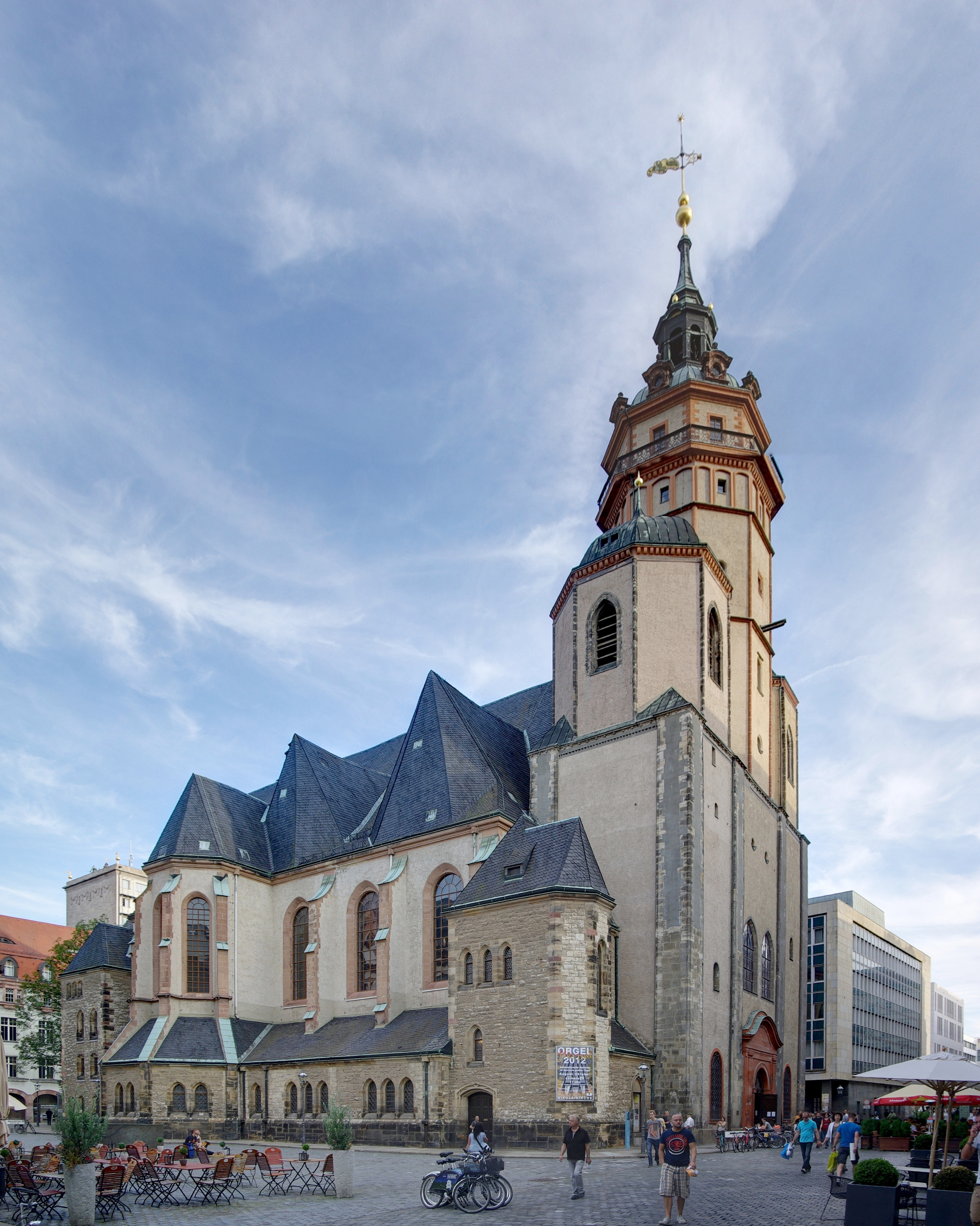
- Nikolaikirche, where the inauguration of a new Leipzig town council was annually performed
- Related: BWV 69a (69.1)
- Occasion: Ratswechsel
- Chorale: "Es woll uns Gott genädig sein"
- Performed: 26 August 1748: Leipzig
- Movements: 6
- Vocal: SATB choir and solo
- Instrumental: 3 trumpets; timpani; 3 oboes; oboe d'amore; bassoon; 2 violins; viola; continuo

Lobe den Herrn, meine Seele (Praise the Lord, my soul), BWV 69, also BWV 69.2, is a cantata by Johann Sebastian Bach.

== History and text ==
Bach composed a cantata with this title (BWV 69a/69.1) in 1723 during his first year in Leipzig. Bach revived the work later in the 1720s, changing the instrumentation of one of the arias. Much later, in 1748, he reworked the cantata for the church service which was held to mark the inauguration of a town council. The recitatives and the chorale were changed. In this form, it was first performed on 26 August 1748. The festive orchestration of the original work was suitable for the new occasion.

The text of the first movement is from Psalm 103. The chorale is the third verse of "Es woll uns Gott genädig sein" by Martin Luther (1524). The author of the rest of the text is unknown.

== Scoring and structure ==
The cantata is scored for four solo voices (soprano, alto, tenor, and bass), a four-part choir, three trumpets, timpani, three oboes, oboe d'amore, bassoon, two violins, viola, and basso continuo.

The work is in six movements:

1. Chorus: Lobe den Herrn, meine Seele
2. Recitative (soprano): Wie groß ist Gottes Güte doch
3. Aria (alto): Meine Seele, auf, erzähle
4. Recitative (tenor): Der Herr hat große Ding an uns getan
5. Aria (bass): Mein Erlöser und Erhalter
6. Chorale: Es danke, Gott, und lobe dich

== Music ==
The chorus and the bass aria are taken without significant alteration from the earlier model. The second movement is a secco soprano recitative which opens much like in the original version before modulating to G major. The other aria is transposed from the tenor original for the alto voice, and is accompanied by violin and oboe instead of flute and oboe da caccia. The following tenor recitative with string accompaniment is "an example of Bach's highly emotional recitative melodic line at its most mature and expressive"; midway through, it moves into a dissonant and chromatic passage. The closing chorale includes prominent parts for trumpet and drums.

== Recordings ==
- Gächinger Kantorei/Bach-Collegium Stuttgart, Helmuth Rilling. Die Bachkantate Vol. 67. Hänssler, 1982.
- Amsterdam Baroque Orchestra & Choir, Ton Koopman. J. S. Bach: Complete Cantatas Vol. 6. Erato, 1997.
- Holland Boys Choir / Netherlands Bach Collegium, Pieter Jan Leusink. Bach Edition Vol. 9. Brilliant Classics, 1999.

== Sources ==
- Lobe den Herrn, meine Seele, BWV 69: Scores at the International Music Score Library Project
