= Anke Vondung =

German opera singer

Anke Vondung (born in Speyer, Rhineland-Palatinate in 1972) is a German mezzo-soprano. She was a member of the Semperoper Dresden from 2003 to 2006.

== Career ==
She won third prize in the 1998 ARD International Music Competition in Munich.

She has sung the roles of Dorabella in Così fan tutte, Octavian in Der Rosenkavalier, and the title role in Carmen. Vondung has sung at German State Operas such as the Semperoper in Dresden, the Berlin State Opera, the Bavarian State Opera in Munich, at the Metropolitan Opera, the Théâtre du Châtelet, as well as at the Salzburg and Glyndebourne Festivals She also sings Bach's sacred music.

At the 2011 Rheingau Musik Festival, she performed the Liebesliederwalzer by Brahms and Spanische Liebeslieder, op. 138, by Schumann with Ruth Ziesak, Werner Güra and Konrad Jarnot at Schloss Johannisberg.

== Discography ==
Vondung's discography includes some 15 recordings, mostly with BBC / Opus Arte, Harmonia Mundi and Farao, among which are:

- Bach cantatas BWV 34a, BWV 69a, Mass in B minor, St Matthew Passion, St John Passion, conducted by Helmuth Rilling
- St Matthew Passion (Farao)
- Richard Strauss, Der Rosenkavalier (as Octavian), Euroarts, 2008
- Beethoven's Missa Solemnis (Farao)
- Mozart's Così fan tutte (as Dorabella), recorded during the 2006 Glyndebourne Festival Opera (Blu-ray, Opus Arte)
