= Julius Blüthner =

German piano maker (1824-1910)

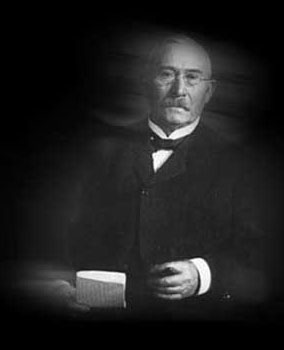
- Julius Blüthner
- Born: 11 March 1824; Falkenhain (now Meuselwitz), Thuringia
- Died: 13 April 1910 (aged 86)
- Occupation: Piano maker

Julius Ferdinand Blüthner (11 March 1824 - 13 April 1910) was a German piano maker and founder of the Blüthner piano factory.

== Biography ==
Blüthner was born in Falkenhain (now Meuselwitz), Thuringia. In 1853 he founded a piano-manufacturing company in Leipzig Germany. Blüthner pianos had an early success at exhibitions, conservatories and the concert stage. Further inventions and innovations lead Blüthner to patent a repetition action, and, in 1873, the aliquot scaling patent for grand pianos. This added a fourth, sympathetic (aliquot) string to each trichord group in the treble to enrich the piano's weakest register by enhancing the overtone spectrum of the instrument. He died, aged 86, in Leipzig.
