= Sympathetic string =

Musical instrument part

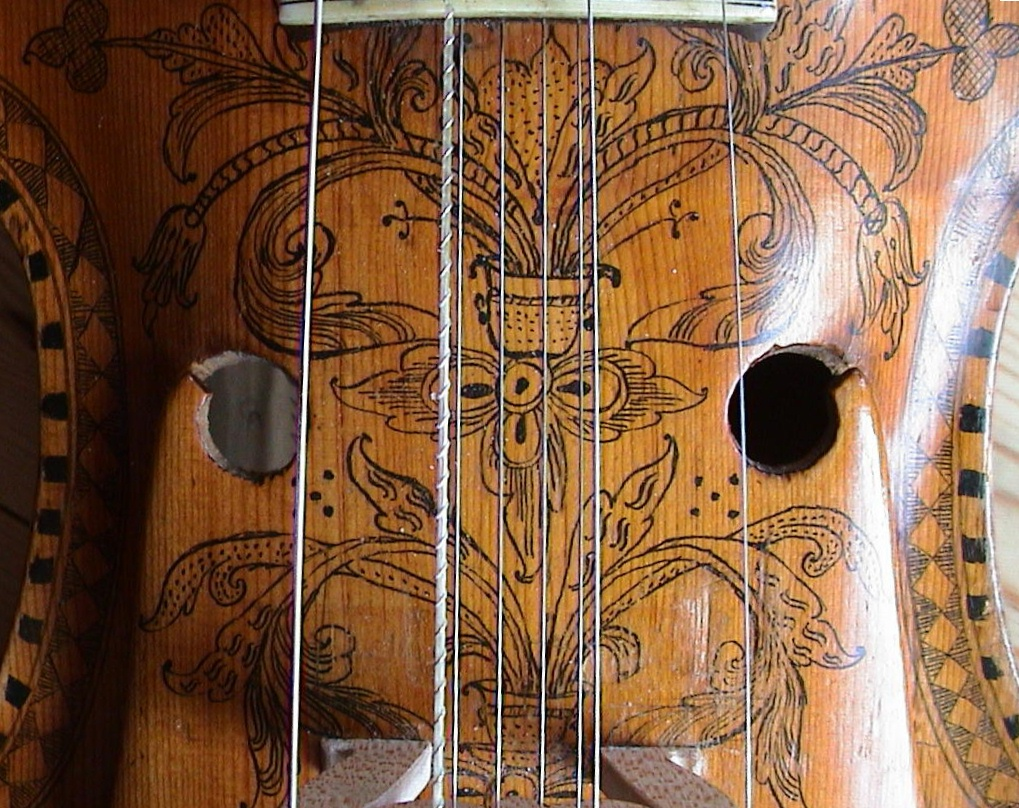
Hardanger fiddle, showing sympathetic strings underneath playing strings

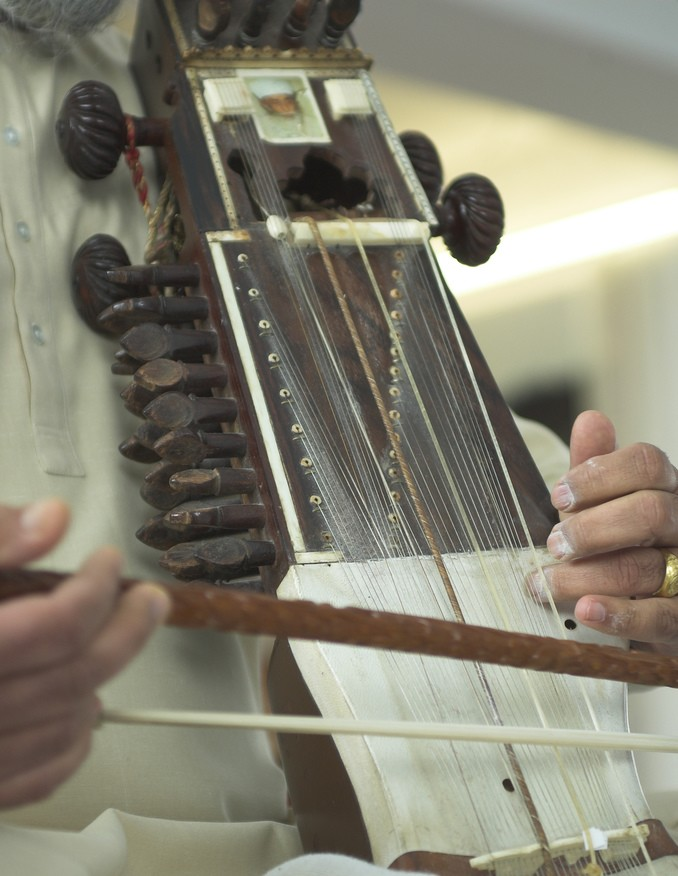
Detail of a sarangi, showing its sympathetic strings under three playing strings

Sympathetic strings or resonance strings are auxiliary strings found on many Indian musical instruments, as well as some Western Baroque instruments and a variety of folk instruments.

They are typically not played directly by the performer (except occasionally as an effect), only indirectly through the tones that are played on the main strings, based on the principle of sympathetic resonance.

The resonance is most often heard when the fundamental frequency of the string is in unison or an octave lower or higher than the catalyst note, although it can occur for other intervals, such as a fifth, with less effect.

== Description ==
Sympathetic strings are used to enhance the sound of an instrument. Some instruments have only a few sympathetic strings such as the Hardanger fiddle (pictured above right). Other instruments which have more include the sitar with 11-13 sympathetic strings and sarod with 15 sympathetic strings, and the sarangi, which has a total of 37 sympathetics.

In Western music, some members of the viola family appeared in the middle of the 17th century that were fitted with an extra choir of thin wire strings running through a hollow chamber through the neck of the instrument, the head of which was then elongated to accommodate as many extra tuning pegs as necessary. These were generally called viola d'amore; another historical example is the baryton, for which Haydn wrote many trios.

Other instruments such as the harp, lute, guitar, harpsichord, and piano do not have additional strings, but make use of the effect by allowing their playing strings to vibrate sympathetically when they are not being played directly. In keyboard instruments like the piano, the string dampers can be raised to produce this effect.

The guitar is normally unable to produce effective sympathetic string resonance for tones other than E (resonance from the 6th and 5th strings, tuned to E and A, respectively), B (from the 6th string), D (from the 4th string), and A (from the 5th and 4th strings). The treble strings are negligible in practice, as they are almost constantly being fingered.

However, the ten-string guitar invented in 1963 by Narciso Yepes, adds four strings tuned to C, A♯, G♯, F♯, which resolves the imbalance of resonance on the guitar. By adding the abovementioned resonances and, of course, their fifths (the fifth being a strong resonant frequency)—that is to say, G, F, D♯, C♯—the guitar's strings now resonate more equally with all 12 notes of the chromatic scale, bringing the guitar's sound closer to the consistency and sustainability of the harpsichord and piano.

== Sympathetic string resonance in music instruments ==
Strings or parts of strings may resonate at their fundamental or harmonic frequencies when other strings are sounded. In general, non-played strings respond in sympathy to other strings being played. Two tones of the same pitch will give maximum sympathetic resonance as all harmonics of both strings will overlap. Other harmonic combinations will cause sympathetic resonance at the fifth, fourth and major third.

For example, an A string at 440 Hz will cause an E string at 330 Hz to resonate, because they share an overtone of 1320 Hz (3 x 440 = 4 x 330 = 1320; third overtone of A and fourth overtone of E).

=== Tuning ===
The musician retunes the sympathetic strings for each mode or raga, so that when the corresponding note (or one an octave below it) is played on the main strings of the instrument, the sympathetic strings (called tarabs in Indian music) will vibrate in response, providing a lingering halo of sound.

== Instruments with sympathetic strings ==
- Banjo
- Baryton
- Bazantar
- Crwth
- Dilruba
- Esraj
- Fender Jaguar
- Fender Jazzmaster
- Gadulka
- Gottuvadhyam
- Gudok
- H'arpeggione
- Hardanger fiddle
- Herati dutar
- Hurdy-gurdy
- Kithara (of Harry Partch)
- Koto
- Some instruments of the lute family
- Mohan veena
- Moodswinger
- Moonlander
- Nyckelharpa
- Ondes Martenot (with Palme diffuseur)
- Pencilina
- Pianos that use aliquot stringing
- Prepared guitar
- Prepared piano
- Rubab
- Rings (Note: A resonance-emulating Eurorack synthesizer module created by Mutable Instruments, has a sympathetic strings algorithm as well as modal and Karplus-Strong string synthesis algorithms.)
- Samvadini (stringed harmonium)
- Sarangi
- Saraswati Veena
- Sarod
- Setar
- Sitar
- Springtime
- Tambura
- Tar (lute)
- Taus
- Ten-string guitar
- Ukelin
- Viola d'amore

== See also ==
- Aliquot stringing
- Drone (music)
