= Konrad Jarnot =

English baritone

Konrad Jarnot (born 1972) is an English baritone who works in opera and oratorio and is a notable performer of Lieder. He is a professor at the Robert Schumann Hochschule.

== Early life ==
Born in Brighton, Jarnot studied voice at the Guildhall School of Music and Drama, London, with Rudolf Piernay, and was awarded the school's Gold Medal. He also took part in masterclasses at London's Wigmore Hall and at Stuttgart with Helmuth Rilling.

In April 1996 he won a Kathleen Ferrier Award, the Decca Prize. Since 1998 he has completed his musical training with Dietrich Fischer-Dieskau.

== Career ==
Jarnot came to international attention in 2000, when he won the First Prize at the ARD International Music Competition in Munich. Since then he has been invited to sing at the Konzerthaus Berlin, the Palais des Beaux Arts, Brussels, the Benaroya Hall, Seattle, the Wigmore Hall, London, the Festspielhaus Baden-Baden, the Concertgebouw, Amsterdam, and many other major venues. He has appeared at dozens of festivals, such as the Schwetzinger Festspiele and the Savonlinna Opera Festival.

Jarnot has worked with conductors including Ralf Gothoni, Enoch zu Guttenberg, Jesús López-Cobos, Jonathan Nott, Andrew Parrott, Karl Anton Rickenbacher, Ulf Schirmer, Peter Schreier, Pinchas Steinberg, Martin Turnovský, Marcello Viotti, Bruno Weil, and David Willcocks.

Since 2009 Jarnot has been a teacher at the Robert Schumann Hochschule in Düsseldorf. He has given masterclasses in Europe and Japan. Among his students is Ulrich Cordes.

== Opera ==
Jarnot has sung Aeneas in Dido and Aeneas in a London production, Onegin in Eugene Onegin in Baden-Baden, Yeletzky in Tchaikovsky's The Queen of Spades in Glasgow, Harlequin in Ariadne auf Naxos, Amfortas in Parsifal at Monte Carlo, Guglielmo in Così fan tutte at Savonlinna, Pelléas in Pelléas et Mélisande at Innsbruck, the Narrator in Gerhard Konzelmann's Die Legende von der schönen Lau at Blaubeuren, and Madhavia in Schubert's Sakontala at Urach. In 2006, he appeared as Leporello in Mozart's Don Giovanni, with Thomas Hengelbrock conducting the Balthasar Neumann ensembles at the Feldkirch Festival.

== Concert ==
In 2007, Jarnot performed Bach's solo cantatas Kreuzstabkantate and Ich habe genug, BWV 82, with the Münchener Kammerorchester, conducted by Christoph Poppen.

== Lied ==
In 2005, Jarnot recorded Lieder of Richard Strauss, including piano arrangements of his Four Last Songs, typically sung by sopranos, with accompanist Helmut Deutsch. In 2011, he performed the Liebesliederwalzer of Brahms and Spanische Liebeslieder op. 138 of Schumann with Ruth Ziesak, Anke Vondung and Werner Güra at Schloss Johannisberg for the Rheingau Musik Festival. Jarnot also champions Erich Wolfgang Korngold's Lieder, which he performed and recorded with pianist Reinild Mees.

== Selected recordings ==
Jarnot was the Vox Christi in recordings of Bach's Passions:

- J.S. Bach: Matthäus-Passion, Martin Lutz, Schiersteiner Kantorei, Barockorchester La Corona, Christoph Prégardien, (Evangelist and arias), Konrad Jarnot, Trine Wilsberg Lund, Yosemeh Adjei, Markus Flaig, Schiersteiner Kantorei Wiesbaden, 2006
- J.S. Bach: Johannes-Passion BWV 245 BWV 245, Philippe Herreweghe, Collegium Vocale Gent, Christoph Prégardien (Evangelist), Konrad Jarnot, Camilla Tilling, Ingeborg Danz, Jan Kobow, Peter Kooy 2007
- J.S. Bach: Der Streit zwischen Phoebus und Pan – The Contest between Phoebus and Pan, BWV 201, Hansjörg Albrecht, Münchener Bach-Chor, Bach-Collegium München, Simone Nold (Momus), Annette Markert (Mercurius), Markus Schäfer (Tmolus), Werner Güra (Midas), Konrad Jarnot (Phoebus), Stephan Genz (Pan), Ohems Classics 2007
- Edward Elgar, Complete Songs for Voice and Piano, Volume 1, Konrad Jarnot (baritone), Reinild Mees (piano), Channel Classics Records CCS SA 27507
