= Werner Güra =

German opera singer

- Born: 1964 (age 61–62); Munich, Germany
- Education: Mozarteum; Musik-Akademie der Stadt Basel
- Occupations: Tenor in opera and concert; Academic teacher
- Years active: 1994–present

Werner Güra (born 1964) is a German classical tenor in opera, concert and Lied, also an academic teacher in Zurich.

== Career ==
Güra was born in Munich. He studied at the Mozarteum University of Salzburg. He continued his studies with Kurt Widmer at the Musik-Akademie der Stadt Basel and with Margreet Honig in Amsterdam. He took courses in acting with Ruth Berghaus and Theo Adam.

On the opera stage he performed as a guest artist at the Frankfurt Opera and the Theater Basel. He was a member of the Semperoper in Dresden from 1994 to 1999, singing especially parts of Mozart and Rossini. Since 1998 he has been a guest at the Staatsoper Berlin.

In concert he performed in Mendelssohn’s Elijah with Philippe Herreweghe at the Salzburg Festival. He also collaborated with conductors such as Peter Schreier, Wolfgang Gönnenwein and Friedemann Layer. In 2002, he recorded the tenor arias in Bach's St Matthew Passion, conducted by Enoch zu Guttenberg, with Marcus Ullmann as the Evangelist and Klaus Mertens as Jesus. In 2004, he appeared at the Rheingau Musik Festival in Handel's Messiah, with che choir and orchestra Bamberger Symphony conducted by Rolf Beck in Eberbach Abbey, recorded live. In 2008, he sang in Mendelssohn’s Paulus with the Kammerchor Stuttgart and the Klassische Philharmonie Stuttgart, conducted by Frieder Bernius, at the Tonhalle Düsseldorf. In 2009, he appeared again at the Rheingau Musik Festival in Schumann's Das Paradies und die Peri.

In the field of historically informed performance, Güra was the tenor (Evangelist and arias) in a 1997 recording of Bach's Christmas Oratorio, conducted by René Jacobs, with the RIAS Kammerchor, the Akademie für Alte Musik Berlin, Dorothea Röschmann, Andreas Scholl and Klaus Häger. In 1998, he recorded the arias of the St Matthew Passion with Philippe Herreweghe, the Collegium Vocale Gent, Evangelist Ian Bostridge, Jesus Franz-Josef Selig, Sibylla Rubens, Andreas Scholl and Dietrich Henschel. In 2006, he was the Evangelist in Bach's Christmas Oratorio with Nikolaus Harnoncourt, the Arnold Schoenberg Chor, the Concentus Musicus Wien, Christine Schäfer, Bernarda Fink, Gerald Finley and Christian Gerhaher, recorded live in the Musikverein Vienna. In 2007, he recorded with the same ensemble Bach's cantata Wir danken dir, Gott, wir danken dir, BWV 29.

Werner Güra is a notable singer of Lieder, mostly accompanied by Christoph Berner. Their recording of Schubert's Winterreise, using a Rönisch fortepiano of 1872, was reviewed in The Times by Hugh Canning in 2010:

By comparison with the veteran Peter Schreier, the younger tenor has a more rounded, agreeable basic timbre, but, like Schreier, he uses a wide palette of vocal and expressive colours to make this Winter’s Journey a spiritual and emotional trajectory through some of Schubert’s most bleak and harrowing soundscapes.

In 2011, he performed the Liebesliederwalzer of Brahms and Spanische Liebeslieder op. 138 of Schumann with Ruth Ziesak, Anke Vondung and Konrad Jarnot at the Rheingau Musik Festival at Schloss Johannisberg.

He is teaching voice and chamber music at the Zürcher Hochschule der Künste.
