= Christoph Berner =

Austrian classical pianist

Christoph Berner (born 1971) is an Austrian classical pianist.

Berner won the prizes for interpretation of the works of Mozart and Schumann at the 2003 Concours Géza Anda. Earlier, he took second in the 1997 International Beethoven Competition, Vienna.

Berner may be best known for his collaborations with German tenor Werner Güra, with whom he has recorded songs of Brahms, Robert and Clara Schumann, and especially Schubert; the duo have recorded both Winterreise and Schwanengesang. He has also collaborated with instrumentalists like Heinrich Schiff.

Berner often plays on a fortepiano, although not necessarily one specific to the piece; on his recording of Winterreise, he used a fortepiano from 1871, 43 years after the death of Schubert.
