= Christoph Prégardien =

German lyric tenor (born 1956)

- Born: 18 January 1956 (age 70); Limburg an der Lahn, Hesse, Germany
- Education: Musikhochschule Frankfurt
- Occupation: Operatic tenor
- Website: www.pregardien.com

Christoph Prégardien (born 18 January 1956) is a German lyric tenor whose career is closely associated with the roles in Mozart operas, as well as performances of Lieder, oratorio roles, and Baroque music. He is well known for his performances and recordings of the Evangelist roles in Bach's St John Passion and St Matthew Passion.

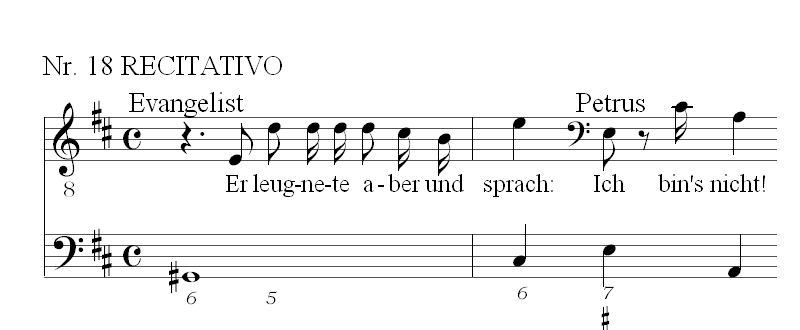
Excerpt of the Evangelist's recitative from Bach's St John Passion

Born in Limburg an der Lahn, he began his musical education as a choirboy at the cathedral's boys' choir, the Limburger Domsingknaben. He then studied singing with Martin Gründler and Karlheinz Jarius in Frankfurt at the Hochschule für Musik, with Carla Castellani in Milan, with Alois Treml in Stuttgart, and attended Hartmut Höll's lieder class.

His orchestral and oratorio repertory spans a wide range from the great Baroque, Classical and Romantic Oratorios to 20th-century works by Britten, Killmayer, Rihm, and Stravinsky. Also recognized as an eminent recitalist, he regularly performs at the major recital venues in Paris, London, Brussels, Berlin, Cologne, Amsterdam, Salzburg, Zurich, Vienna, Barcelona and Geneva, as well as during his concert tours throughout Italy, Japan and North America. He regularly collaborates with piano partners Michael Gees and Andreas Staier.

He has made over 120 recordings, on major labels such as BMG, EMI, Deutsche Grammophon, Philips, Sony, Erato and Teldec. His recordings of German Lieder have been highly acclaimed by the public and press, and have received international awards, including the Orphée d'Or de l'Academie du Disque Lyrique, the Edison Award, and others. He took part in the project of Ton Koopman and the Amsterdam Baroque Orchestra & Choir to record Bach's complete vocal works.

In opera, Prégardien has made stage appearances in major European houses, performing leading roles as Tamino, Don Ottavio, Tito, Count Almaviva, Fenton, and Monteverdi's Ulisse.

Prégardien is also an educator. From 2000 to 2005, he was in charge of a vocal class at the Hochschule für Musik und Theater in Zurich. Since the autumn of 2004, he has been a professor at the Hochschule für Musik Köln. Among his students is Ulrich Cordes. His son, Julian Prégardien, is also a tenor.

In 2018, Prégardien recorded his first CD as a baritone singer, performing cantatas by Bach and Telemann.

== Selected recordings ==
- Marc-Antoine Charpentier: "Motets à double Choeur", H.403, H.404, H.135, H.136, H.137, H.392, H.410, H.167, Barbara Schlick, Nancy Zijlstra, Klaus Mertens, Dominique Visse, Kai Wessel, Christophe Prégardien, Harry Van Berne, Peter Kooij, The Amsterdam Baroque Orchestra conducted by Ton Koopman. 2 CD Erato 1992
- J.S. Bach: Johannes-Passion BWV 245, Philippe Herreweghe, Collegium Vocale Gent, Christoph Prégardien, Konrad Jarnot (Vox Christi), Camilla Tilling, Ingeborg Danz, Jan Kobow, Peter Kooy 2007
