= Johann Baptist Streicher =

Austrian piano maker (1796–1871)

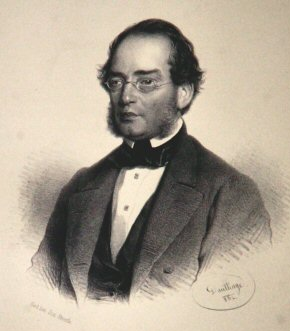
Johann Baptist Streicher (lithograph by Adolf Dauthage, 1862)

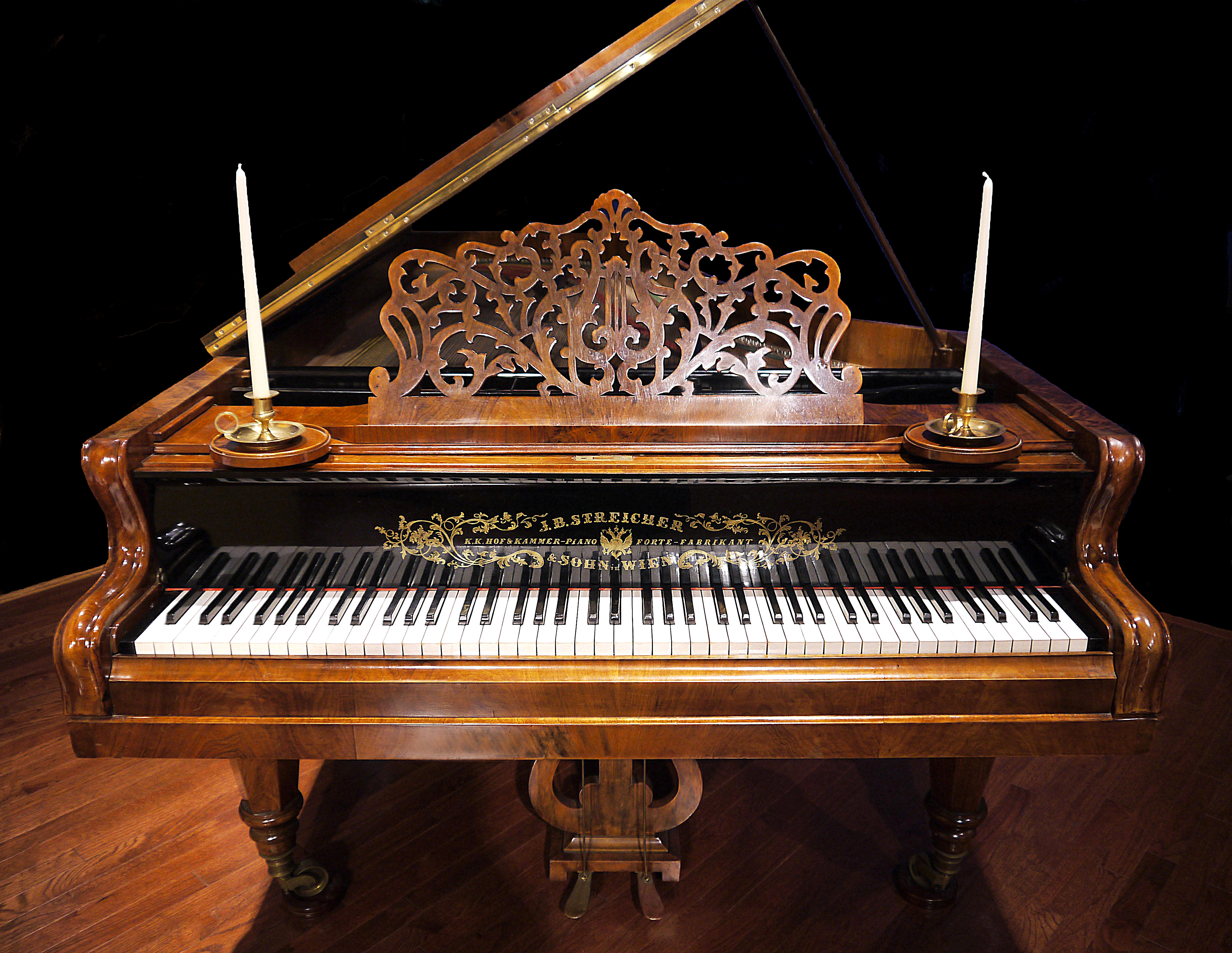
Piano from the J.B.Streicher's manufactory (Vienna, 1869)

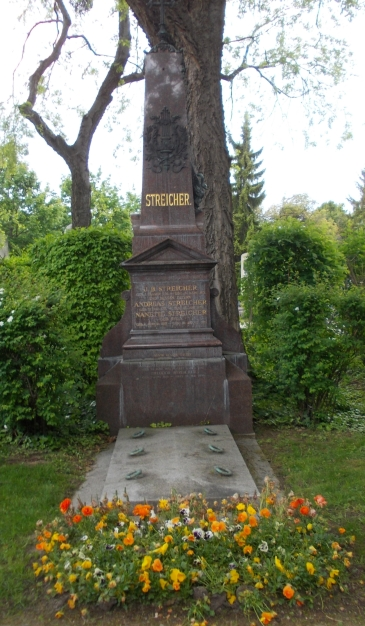
Tomb of Johann Baptist Streicher

Johann Baptist Streicher (3 January 1796 in Vienna – 28 March 1871 in Vienna) was an Austrian piano maker that comes from a dynasty piano builders. The tradition began with Johann Streicher's grandfather, Johann Andreas Stein, who was a central figure in the history of the piano. No less remarkable of figures in this dynasty, though, were his parents. Nannette Streicher, his mother, assumed charge of her father's business in 1792 and set up a piano making company in Vienna. Initially, she was working together with her husband Andreas Streicher and her 16-year-old younger brother Matthias Andreas Stein (1776-1842) under the business name Geschwister Stein. After 10 years, the siblings decided to part ways, and Nannette Streicher continued building pianos under her own name (Nannette Streicher née Stein). She was also one of the closest friends of Beethoven and even agreed in August 1817 to help her friend by managing his chaotic household, while the composer was going through one of the many crises that marked his life.

== Life ==
Johann Baptist Streicher learned the piano making craft from his parents and became a partner in the business in 1823. After the death of his parents, he was the sole owner of the company. Among his pupils was the German piano maker known by the name Johann Bernhard Klems. Johannes Brahms, a fond owner of a Streicher piano and famous composer, once said in his letter to a German pianist Clara Schumann that "There [on my Streicher] I always know exactly what I write and why I write one way or another”. Streicher's son, Emil, sold the family business in 1896 to the brothers Stingl because grandson Theodor had aspirations as a composer and no interest in continuing the franchise.

In 1893, one of the streets in Vienna Landstrasse (3rd district) was named after Streicher - the Streichergasse.

He was buried in his father's grave of honor (German: Ehrengrab) in the Vienna Central Cemetery (group 32A, number 30).

The first modern copy was built in 2014 after J.Streicher 1868 piano that Johannes Brahms received as a gift in 1870 and kept in his house until death.

== Family ==
Johann Baptist Streicher was first married to Auguste (born André), who died on July 1, 1847, at the age of 45. They had a son, Emil Streicher (born April 24, 1836, in Vienna, died January 9, 1916, in Vienna). Emil joined his father's company in 1857 and ran it alone after his death. On January 7, 1849, Johann Baptist Streicher married a pianist Friederike Müller. Their daughter Carolin Johanna was born on October 25, 1849.

== Recordings made with originals and replicas of Streicher pianos ==
- Boyd McDonald. Johannes Brahms. The piano Miniatures. Played on the 1851 Streicher piano
- Hardy Rittner. Johannes Brahms. Complete Piano Music. Played on the 1846 Bosendorfer, 1856 and the 1868 Streicher pianos
- Alexandre Oguey, Neal Peres De Costa. Pastoral Fables. Works for cor anglais and pianos. Played on a replica of a Streicher instrument (by Paul McNulty)

== Bibliography ==
- Felix Czeike. Historisches Lexikon Wien. Volume 5. Kremayr & Scheriau, Vienna 1997, ISBN 978-3-218-00547-0, p. 378
