= Kissinger Sommer =

Classical music festival

- Genre: classical music
- Dates: June, July
- Location: Bad Kissingen
- Coordinates: 50°11′53″N 10°04′29″E
- Years active: 1986–present
- Website: www.kissingersommer.de

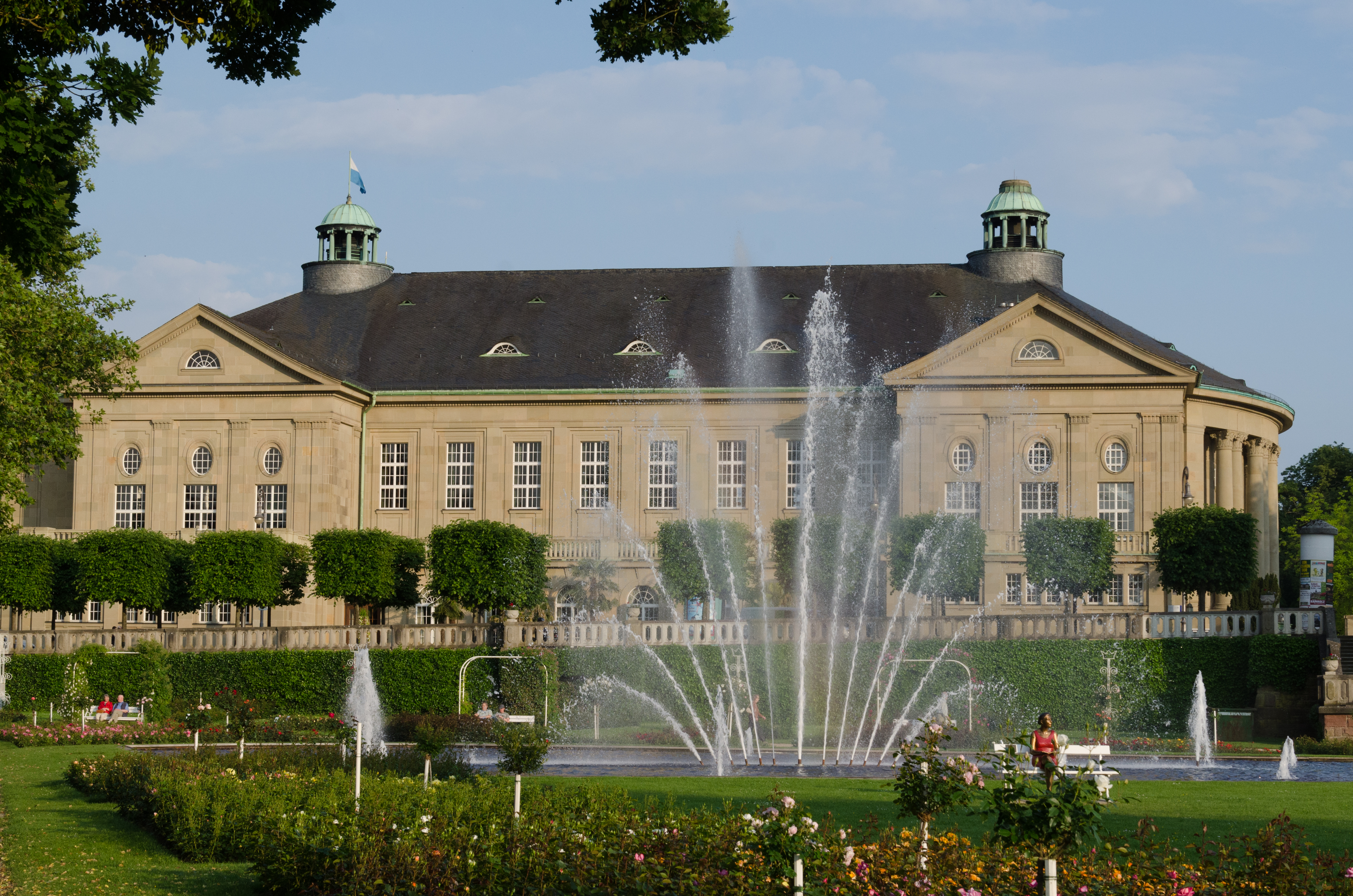
The Bad Kissingen concert hall "Regentenbau", one of the sites of the "Kissinger Sommer"

The Kissinger Sommer is a classical music festival held every year in the summer in the city of Bad Kissingen in Bavaria, Southern Germany.

== History ==
The festival was founded in 1986. At the beginning the focus of the festival was on the improvement of the cultural relations between eastern and western Europe. Every year an east-european country was partner of the festival, beginning with Hungary in 1986. Poland, Czechoslovakia and the Soviet Union followed. So the festival became a place where one could see artists from east and west, especially of the partner-countries and of East-Germany. Among the artists of the first years were Dmitry Sitkovetsky, Boris Pergamenschikow and Svjatoslav Richter. After the fall of the iron curtain the festival turned to a world-wide view with partner-countries in whole Europe, North America and China. Every summer around 50 concerts are attracting about 30 000 visitors. The occurring interpreters are a mixture of well-known international stars like Cecilia Bartoli, Arcadi Volodos, Fazıl Say or Grigory Sokolov, and newcomers, who often later have made a great career too, like Lang Lang, Diana Damrau or David Garrett.

Director of the "Kissinger Sommer" from 1986 until 2016 was Kari Kahl-Wolfsjäger. Her successor, beginning in 2017, was Tilman Schlömp, formerly artistic director at the festival Beethovenfest in Bonn. He changed the concept of the festival. Instead of partner countries, there are now main topics, starting in 2017 with the motto "1830 – Romantic Revolution" and followed in 2018 by "1918 – emergence of the modern age". The contract of Schlömp ended in 2021. Alexander Steinbeis, previously orchestra director of the DSO Berlin, was appointed as his successor from 2022 on.

In 2020 the festival was cancelled because of the COVID-19 pandemic.

== Contemporary music ==
From the beginning the festival is also a place for contemporary composers like Alfred Schnittke, Sofia Gubaidulina, Edison Denisov, Aribert Reimann or Wolfgang Rihm. There have been world premieres of composers like Jean Françaix (Dixtuor, in 1987), Krzysztof Penderecki (Sinfonietta No. 2 for clarinet and string orchestra, in 1994) and Fazıl Say (Sonata for clarinet and piano, op. 42, in 2012). Since 2006 composers present themselves and premieres of their music in the workshop Bad Kissinger Liederwerkstatt. Up to 2018, around 80 world premieres have already been produced as part of the Liederwerkstatt. However, there are also world premieres outside the Liederwerkstatt, such as the Concerto No. 1 for violin and orchestra by Gediminas Gelgotas in 2018 and in 2019 a new version of the opera "Orfeo ed Euridice" by Damian Scholl.

== Artists in residence ==
Artists-in-residence have been in the last years:

- 2014 Ning Feng and Igor Levit
- 2015 Igor Levit
- 2016 Daniil Trifonov
- 2017 Patricia Kopatchinskaja and Vesselina Kasarova
- 2018 Sol Gabetta
- 2019 Julia Lezhneva
- 2020 Jean-Yves Thibaudet (planned, festival cancelled)

== Orchestra in residence ==
- 2017–2021 Deutsche Kammerphilharmonie Bremen

== Luitpold Prize ==
Every year since 1999 the Luitpoldpreis (Luitpold Prize) is awarded to a young interpreter of the festival. The prize is named after Luitpold, Prince Regent of Bavaria, who let build the great Bad Kissingen concert hall Regentenbau, where many of the concerts of the festival take place. The winners are:

- 1999 – Nikolaj Znaider, violin
- 2000 – Alisa Weilerstein, cello
- 2001 – Jochen Kupfer, baritone
- 2002 – Isa Katharina Gericke, soprano
- 2003 – Baiba Skride, violin
- 2004 – Jan Kobow, tenor
- 2005 – Mojca Erdmann, soprano
- 2006 – Peter Ovtcharov, piano
- 2007 – Tine Thing Helseth, trumpet
- 2008 – David Lomeli, tenor
- 2009 – Igor Levit, piano
- 2010 – Kejia Xiong, tenor
- 2011 – Anna Lucia Richter, soprano
- 2012 – Dmitry Korchak, tenor
- 2013 – Julia Novikova, soprano
- 2013 – Konstantin Shamray, piano
- 2014 – Kian Soltani, cello
- 2015 – Sung Min Song, tenor
- 2016 – Andrei Ioniță, cello
- 2017 – Julian Trevelyan, piano
- 2018 – Sheva Tehoval, soprano
- 2019 – Julian Habermann, tenor
- 2020 – not awarded (festival cancelled)
- 2021 – Sarah Aristidou, soprano
- 2022 – Lucas & Arthur Jussen, piano
- 2023 – María Dueñas, violin
- 2024 – Timothy Ridout, viola
- 2025 – Jérémie Moreau, piano

== Kissinger Klavierolymp ==
The festival is connected to the Kissinger Klavierolymp (Kissinger Piano Olympics), a competition of young pianists which takes place in autumn in Bad Kissingen since 2003. The prize for the winners is a performance at the Kissinger Sommer. Among them are Martin Helmchen, Nikolai Tokarev, Kirill Gerstein, Igor Levit, Alice Sara Ott and Kit Armstrong. Among the last winners are Elisabeth Brauß (2016), Emre Yavuz (2017) and Juan Pérez Floristán (2018).

=== Recipients ===
No.	Year	1st place	2nd place	3rd place	Audience Prize
1.	2003	Martin Helmchen; Nikolai Tokarev	Stewart Goodyear	Kirill Gerstein	Mihaela Ursuleasa
2.	2004	Alexei Zuev	Igor Levit	Alice Sara Ott	Andrei Banciu
3.	2005	Herbert Schuch	Lukas Vondrávcek	Anna Winnizkaja; Peter Ovtcharov	Joseph Moog; Miroslav Kultyshev
4.	2006	Christian Ihle Hadland; Kit Armstrong	not awarded	Alexej Gorlach	Mona Asuka Ott
5.	2007	Vestards Šimkus	Michail Lifits	David Kadouch	Zhang Hai'ou
6.	2008	Yeol Eum Son	Olga Scheps	Benjamin Kim	Claire Huangci
7.	2009	Kiryl Keduk	Boris Kusnezow	Kateryna Titova	Kiryl Keduk
8.	2010	Behzod Abduraimov	Nareh Arghamanyan	Avan Yu	Alexei Grigorjew
9.	2011	Konstantin Shamray	Adan Laloum	Pawel Kolesnikow	Pawel Kolesnikow
10.	2012	Magdalena Müllerperth; Da Sol Kim	not awarded	Beatrice Magnani	Magdalena Müllerperth
11.	2013	Chi-Ho Han	Georgy Tchaidze	Aurelia Shimkus	Chi Ho Han
12.	2014	Julian Jia	Niu Niu	Boyang Shi	Julian Jia
13.	2015	Jorge González Buajasán	Maxim Lando	Clayton Stephenson	Jorge González
14.	2016	Elisabeth Brauß	Julian Trevelyan; Thomas Schuch	not awarded	Nikolay Khozyainov
15.	2017	Emre Yavuz	Sergei Redkin	Viktor Soos	Luisa Imorde
16.	2018	Juan Pérez Floristán	Martin James Bartlett	Łukasz Krupiński	Martin James Bartlett
17.	2019	Tomoki Sakata	Tiffany Poon	Robert Neumann	Tomoki Sakata
18.	2020	Sergey Tanin	Yoav Levanon	Ziyu Liu	Sergey Tanin
19.	2021	Giorgi Gigashvili	Sandro Nebieridze	Gustav Piekut	Giorgi Gigashvili
20.	2022	Roman Borisov	Tony Siqi Yun	Ariel Lanyi	Tony Siqi Yun
21.	2023	Mihály Berecz	Mirabelle Kajenjeri	Miyu Shindo	Miyu Shindo
22.	2024	Illia Ovcharenko	Jérémie Moreau	Onutė Gražinytė	Simon Haje
23.	2025	Alon Kariv	Dmitry Yudin	Elia Cecino	Dmitry Yudin
