= Tarantella (Stravinsky) =

1898 unfinished piano work by Igor Stravinsky

- by Igor Stravinsky
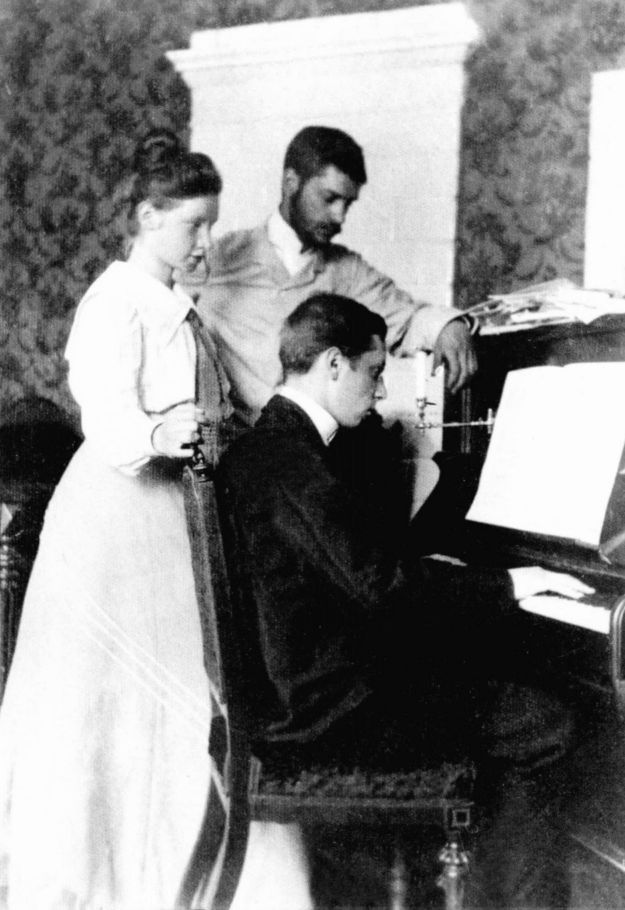
- Stravinsky (seated) with his brother and Yekaterina Nosenko, his cousin and future wife, 1900
- Composed: October 14, 1898
- Dedication: D. Rudnev
- Duration: c. 1 minute
- Scoring: Piano

Premiere
- Date: 2021
- Performers: Alexey Zuev

The "Tarantella" by Igor Stravinsky is an unfinished 16-measure fragment for piano composed on October 14, 1898. It is his earliest surviving attempt at composition.

What motivated Stravinsky to compose "Tarantella" is unknown, but musicologist Graham Griffiths speculates it was an improvisation related to outings with his cousin in search of tarantulas. It was eventually deposited at the Russian Public Library in Leningrad, where it was discovered by musicologist Valery Smirnov, who published excerpts in 1970. Richard Taruskin wrote that its only noteworthy quality was "how little talent it displays", but Griffiths said its "greater significance" was as an example of a "creative process adopted intuitively by Stravinsky at a time when he was still musically uneducated".

== Background ==
Stravinsky began to take piano lessons in his youth, although when these started is unclear. According to a biographical résumé the composer wrote in March 1908, he commenced lessons in 1891 or early 1892 with Alexandra Snyetkova, the daughter of a violinist in the Mariinsky Theatre Orchestra. The personal accounts of his father, Fyodor, first mentions lessons in May 1892, which were conducted informally by an interim governess. Richard Taruskin and Stephen Walsh both wrote that lessons did not begin until late 1893. By 1899, when Stravinsky transferred to another teacher for piano lessons, he had developed enough skill to play Felix Mendelssohn's Piano Concerto No. 1, as well as sonatas and works by Franz Joseph Haydn, Wolfgang Amadeus Mozart, Muzio Clementi, Ludwig van Beethoven, Franz Schubert, and Robert Schumann.

The "Tarantella" emerged from this period. Musicologist Graham Griffiths says that it was possibly modeled after examples of tarantellas composed by Frédéric Chopin, Franz Liszt, and Sigismund Thalberg, among others. It may also have been a late product of the 19th-century Russian interest in tarantellas exemplified in works by Alexander Dargomizhsky, César Cui, and Pyotr Ilyich Tchaikovsky. Griffiths speculates that the work originated as an improvisation inspired by the composer's outings with his cousin in search of tarantulas at the family estate in the Podolia region.

Taruskin believed that its dedication to "D. Rudnev", which suggests that it was a gift, may have preserved the manuscript from being lost. It was eventually given to the Russian Public Library in Leningrad. There it was discovered by musicologist Valery Smirnov, who published excerpts from it in 1970. It is Stravinsky's earliest surviving attempt at composition.

== Music ==
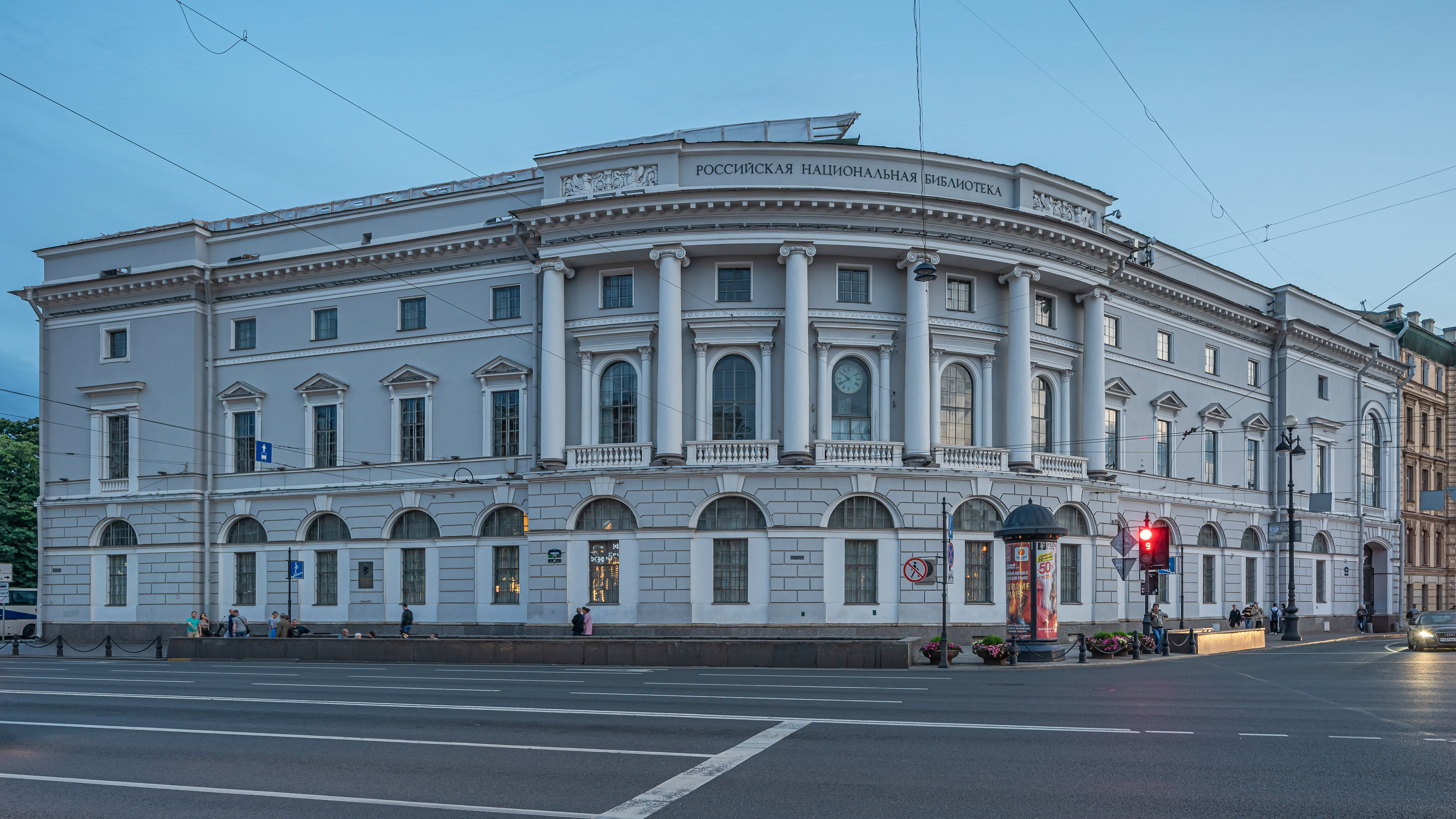
The manuscript ended up at the Russian Public Library where it was discovered.

The "Tarantella" is a 16-measure fragment. The manuscript is written in pencil. The music has the tempo marking "Allegretto"; it is composed in compound duple time and begins with open fifths in the bass. Smirnov attributed the melody's pentatonicism to influences from the lezginka and Alexander Glazunov's ballet Raymonda. The sketch evinces Stravinsky's lack of understanding of rudimentary knowledge of musical theory and notation at the time. He later recalled that he "passionately" loved to improvise music in his "young, boyish years", but was unable to notate anything because of his deficient technical knowledge. The work's middle section is missing the music for the left hand.

A performance lasts approximately 1 minute.

=== Manuscript ===
The manuscript covers both sides of a single sheet of horizontally lined paper, folded in half; the music is written with the paper oriented vertically. On the right-hand side of the sheet's front is the title page of the work adorned with doodles. The date of composition is written on the top right corner. Below the composition's title is Stravinsky's signature; at the bottom of the page is the inscription: "Dedicated by the author to D. Rudnev". On the obverse side is the music, with staffs ruled by hand.

== Premiere ==
Alexey Zuev made the world premiere recording of the "Tarantella" for Fuga Libera in 2021. It was included in an integral set of Stravinsky's compositions and transcriptions for piano. The pianist composed his own reconstruction of the missing left hand part.

== Reception ==
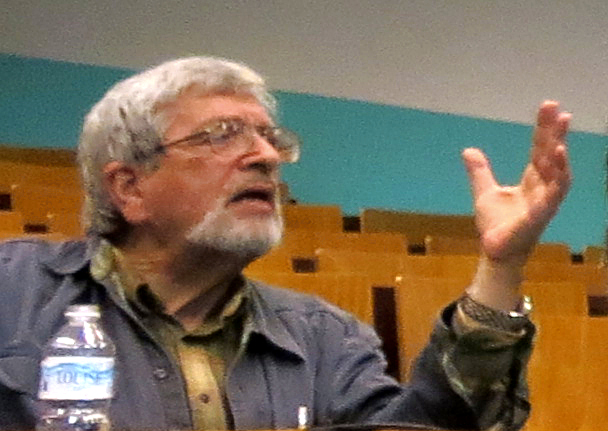
Richard Taruskin was dismissive of the "Tarantella".

Walsh wrote that were it not for the existence of the "Tarantella", scholars and listeners "might be tempted to doubt whether composition was even a speck on the horizon until [Stravinsky] left school in 1901". Taruskin dismissed the work, saying that its only noteworthy quality was "how little talent it displays", and that it is "the sort of piece every thirteen-year-old piano student writes, only Stravinsky wrote it at sixteen".

Griffiths wrote that the "Tarantella" was better understood not as an "example of immature writing", but as an "early (possibly initial) attempt" by Stravinsky at notating his own improvisations:

As such, it suggests that the path by which Stravinsky began to formulate his personal creativity was one within which he transformed the improvised musical idea into a notated musical composition via the terrain of familiar pianistic formulæ. The greater significance of this "work" is not, therefore, as composition, but as a creative process adopted intuitively by Stravinsky at a time when he was still musically uneducated.

He also said that its "wrong" notes and harmonies may not have been the unintentional results of his ignorance of rudimentary musical theory, but "intentional, descriptive effects" which "musical jokers" before and after him would appreciate as tools for humor.
