= Lucas Krupinski =

British-Polish pianist (born 1992)

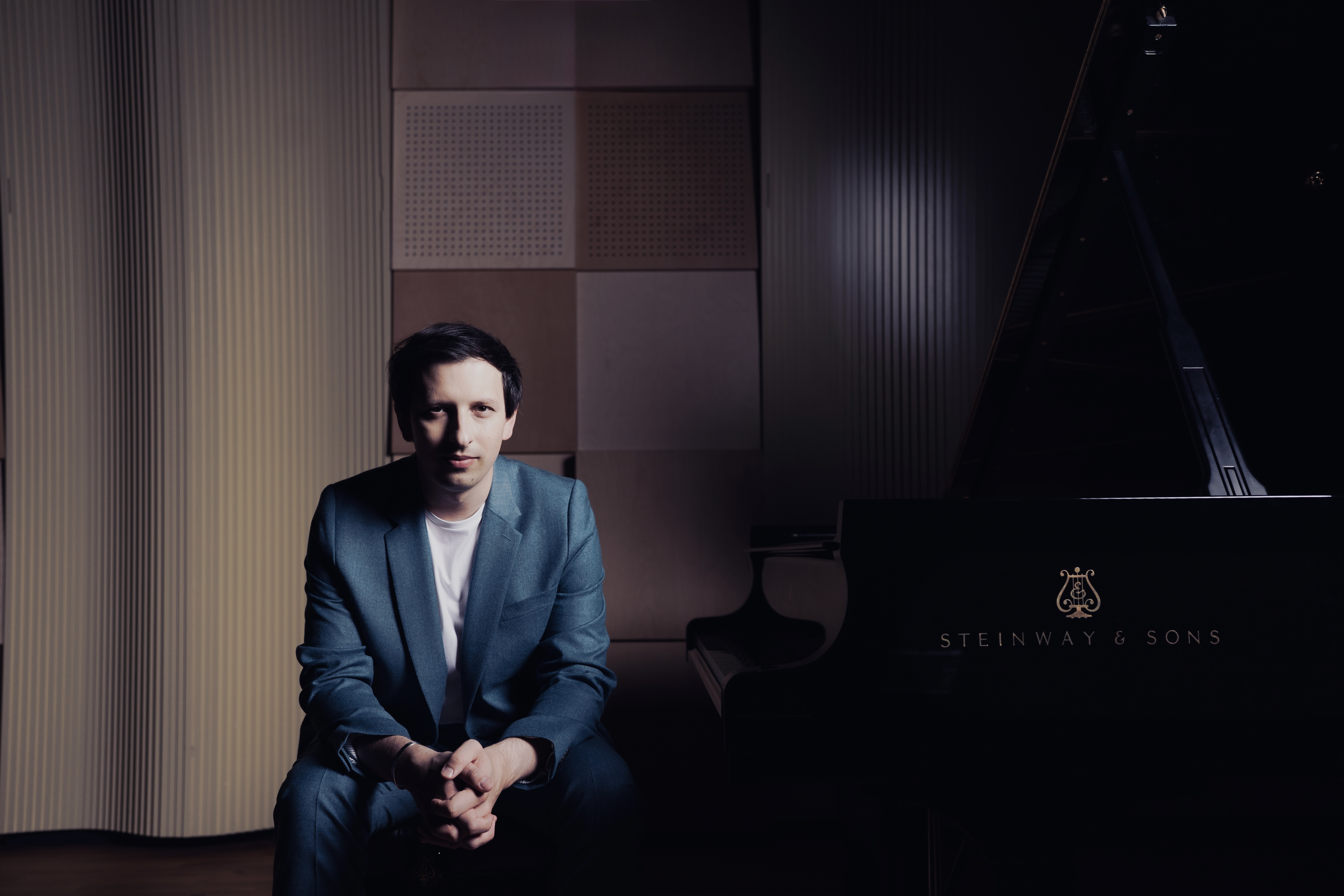
- Krupinski in 2026
- Born: Łukasz Krupiński; June 5, 1992 (age 34); Warsaw, Poland

Lucas Krupinski (born 5 June 1992), born Łukasz Krupiński, is a British-Polish pianist and Steinway Artist.

== Biography ==
Since his Carnegie Hall debut in 2018, Krupinski has appeared with orchestras such as the Royal Philharmonic Orchestra, Jerusalem Symphony, Warsaw Philharmonic, Sinfonia Varsovia, Buffalo Philharmonic, Armenian State Symphony, Bratislava Radio Symphony, George Enescu Philharmonic, and the Orchestra of the Americas. He has performed at major venues across Europe, Asia, and North America, including the Royal Albert Hall, Wigmore Hall, La Fenice, Salle Cortot, Auditorium La Verdi, Merkin Hall, and a special recital at the PyeongChang Winter Olympics.

Krupinski's debut album, Espressione … From Bolzano to San Marino, featuring Chopin, Scriabin, and Haydn, was praised by British classical music publication Gramophone, Pizzicato, and international broadcasters for its passionate reading and rich tonal colour, receiving airplay on BBC Radio 3, WQXR New York, ABC Australia, Polish Radio 2, and CBC Canada. It was nominated for the International Classical Music Awards alongside albums by Krystian Zimerman and Evgeny Kissin.

A chamber musician, Krupinski has been a member of the Penderecki Trio since 2023, alongside violinist Leticia Moreno and cellist Claudio Bohórquez.

Born in Warsaw in 1992, Krupinski studied with Joanna Ławrynowicz before continuing at the Fryderyk Chopin University of Music in Warsaw with Alicja Paleta-Bugaj and Konrad Skolarski, graduating with Magna cum Laude distinction. He continued advanced studies with Arie Vardi in Hanover and Dmitri Alexeev at the Royal College of Music in London, and is pursuing a doctorate at the Chopin University in Warsaw.

Krupinski won the Grand Prix at the 7th San Marino International Piano Competition, along with all three top prizes: Audience, Critics’, and Orchestra Awards. He also reached final rounds of the Busoni, Leeds, and Chopin piano competitions, and won first prizes at international contests in Hannover (Chopin Gesellschaft), Aachen (ClaviCologne), Görlitz (MeetingPoint Music Messiaen), and Yamaha Europe.

In addition to being a three-time laureate of the Minister of Culture and National Heritage Award, Krupinski has received scholarships from the Krystian Zimerman Foundation and, most recently (June 2025), the prestigious Minister of Science and Higher Education Scholarship for Outstanding Young Researchers – as the sole doctoral student in musical arts nationwide. He was also honoured with a Commemorative Medal from the Chopin University of Music in recognition of his artistic achievements.

Lucas Krupinski is represented by the Ludwig van Beethoven Association.

== Awards and competitions ==
- Grand Prix and two special prizes at the 2nd Siberian International Chopin Piano Competition in Tomsk (Russia) (2013)
- Polish Minister of Culture and National Heritage Prize for remarkable artistic accomplishments, 2013 & 2014
- I Prize at the Music Foundation of Europe Scholarship Piano Competition, 2014
- II Prize at the 47th Polish Chopin Competitions in Warsaw, 2015
- I Prize at the 15th Chopin-Gesellschaft International Piano Competitions in Hannover, 2015
- I Prize at the ClaviCologne International Piano Competition 2016 in Aachen
- I prize at the International Piano Competition in San Marino, 2016. In addition to the main prize, he received all the additional prices: the Audience Award, the Music Critics’ Award and the Orchestra Award.
- III prize at the Kissinger Klavierolymp (Kissingen Piano Olympics) 2018
- Main Prize at the Messiaen Music MeetingPoint Competition in Goerlitz, 2020
