= Suntory Music Award =

Japanese music award

The Suntory Music Award (Japanese: サントリー音楽賞, Santorī ongakushō), previously known as the Torii Music Award (鳥井音楽賞, Torii ongakushō), designed to promote Western music in Japan, has been given by the Suntory Music Foundation since their establishment in 1969. The award is presented annually to individuals or groups for the greatest achievement in the development of Western or contemporary music in Japan during the previous year.

The current prize is 7,000,000 yen (approximately US $70,000). A Suntory Music Award Commemorative Concert is held annually in Suntory Hall to introduce and popularize the work of the recipient.

== Recipients ==
No.	Year	Recipient	Notes
1	1969	Michio Kobayashi (小林 道夫), pianist, harpsichordist and conductor	
2	1970	Tsuyoshi Tsutsumi, cellist	
3	1971	Reiji Mitani (三谷 礼二), opera producer	
4	1972	Takashi Ogawa (小川 昂), theorist and critic	
5	1973	International Christian University Organ Committee	
6	1974	Kazuyoshi Akiyama, conductor	
7	1975	Yoshinobu Kuribayashi (栗林 義信), baritone Ginji Yamane (山根 銀二), critic	
8	1976	Yasushi Akutagawa, composer and conductor New Symphony Orchestra (新交響楽団)	
9	1977	Toshiko Tsunemori (常森 寿子), soprano	
10	1978	Teizō Matsumura, composer	
11	1979	Sumire Yoshihara (吉原 すみれ), percussionist	
11	1979	Special award: Mari Iwamoto String Quartet (巖本真理弦楽四重奏団)	
12	1980	Kappa Senoo (妹尾 河童), scenic designer	
12	1980	Special award: Hideo Edo (江戸 英雄), president of the 1st Japan International Music Competition	
13	1981	Minao Shibata, composer	
14	1982	Yūzō Toyama, conductor	
14	1982	Special award: Kiyoshi Hara, Representative of The Symphony Hall Construction Group	
15	1983	Keisuke Suzuki (鈴木 敬介), opera producer	
16	1984	Kiyomi Toyoda (豊田 喜代美), soprano	
17	1985	Telemann Institute Japan Chamber Orchestra and Chorus	Telemann Institute Japan website
18	1986	Mitsuko Uchida, pianist Hiroshi Wakasugi, conductor	
19	1987	Hiroyuki Iwaki, conductor	
20	1988	Yasuko Hayashi (林 康子), soprano	
21	1989	Masahiro Arita (有田 正広), early music performer	
22	1990	Tōru Takemitsu, composer	
23	1991	Tadaaki Otaka, conductor	
24	1992	Shigeo Neriki (練木 繁夫), pianist	
25	1993	Midori Gotō, violinist	
25	1993	Special award: Wolfgang Sawallisch, conductor	
26	1994	Takayoshi Wanami (和波 孝禧), violinist	
27	1995	Nobuko Imai, violist	
28	1996	Takahiro Sonoda, pianist Jōji Yuasa, composer	
29	1997	Tokyo Symphony Orchestra	
29	1997	Special award: Toshiro Mayuzumi, composer	
30	1998	Hikaru Hayashi, composer	
31	1999	Akira Miyoshi, composer	
32	2000	Taijiro Iimori (飯守 泰次郎), conductor	Taijiro Iimori website
33	2001	Toshi Ichiyanagi, composer	
34	2002	Seiji Ozawa, conductor Kaori Kimura (木村 かをり), pianist	
35	2003	Ichiro Nodaira (野平 一郎), composer	Ichiro Nodaira website
36	2004	Akira Nishimura, composer	
37	2005	Hidemi Suzuki, cellist and conductor	
38	2006	Tokyo Philharmonic Chorus (東京混声合唱団)	Tokyo Philharmonic Chorus website (in Japanese)
39	2007	Toshio Hosokawa, composer	
40	2008	Yumi Koyama (小山 由美), mezzo-soprano	
41	2009	Kazushi Ōno, conductor	
42	2010	Yoshio Watanabe (渡邊順生), harpsichordist	
43	2011	not awarded	
44	2012	Mihoko Fujimura, mezzo-soprano	
45	2013	Masaaki Suzuki and the Bach Collegium Japan	
46	2014	Junichi Hirokami and the Kyoto Symphony Orchestra	
47	2015	Toppan Hall	
48	2016	Yu Kosuge, pianist	
49	2017	Yomiuri Nippon Symphony Orchestra	
50	2018	Ken Takaseki (高関健), conductor	
51	2019	Hisako Kawamura (河村尚子), pianist	
52	2020	Masahiro Miwa (三輪眞弘), composer	
53	2021	Yoshimichi Hamada (濱田芳通), direction, recorder, cornet	
54	2022	Michiyoshi Inoue, conductor	
55	2023	Jō Kondō, composer	
56	2024	Kazuki Yamada, conductor	
57	2025	Shunske Sato, violinist and conductor	
