= Willibald (name) =

Willibald can be a masculine given name, a middle name, or a surname. Notable people with the name include:

== Mononym ==
- Willibald (c. 700 – c. 787), bishop of Eichstätt, modern-day Germany
- Willibald of Mainz (fl. 8th century), Anglo-Saxon priest and author

== Given name ==
- Willibald Alexis, German novelist
- Willibald Beyschlag, German Protestant theologian
- Willibald C. Bianchi, U.S. Army officer
- Willibald Borowietz, German general
- Willibald Cernko, Austrian bank manager
- Willibald von Langermann und Erlencamp, German general
- Willibald Eser, German screenwriter
- Willibald Hahn (1910–1999), Austrian footballer and football manager
- Willibald Hentschel, German writer and activist
- Willibald Imhoff, art collector
- Willibald Jentschke, Austrian-German nuclear physicist
- Willibald Kirbes (1902–1990), Austrian footballer
- Willibald Kirfel, German Indologist
- Willibald Kreß (1906–1989), German footballer
- Willibald Joseph MacDonald, Canadian educator and politician
- Willibald Monschein, Austrian paralympic athlete
- Willibald Nagel (1870–1911), German physiologist
- Willibald Pahr, Austrian politician and diplomat
- Willibald Pirckheimer, German lawyer, author, and humanist
- Willibald Peter Prasthofer, Austrian rocket scientist and educator
- Willibald Ruttensteiner, Austrian businessman and football manager
- Willibald Sauerländer, German art historian
- Willibald Schmaus (1912–1979), Austrian football defender
- Willibald Schulze, German writer
- Willibald Stanek (1913–2007), Austrian ice hockey player
- Willibald Stejskal (1896–1977), Austrian football defender and football manager
- Willibald Trinks, German-American scientist
- Willibald Utz, German general

== Middle name ==
- Hermann Willibald Fischer, German mechanical engineer
- Christoph Willibald Gluck (1714–1787), composer
- Karl Georg Otto Willibald von Kalckstein, Prussian politician
- Hermann Georg Willibald Koch, Estonian politician

== Surname ==
- Maximilian Willibald of Waldburg-Wolfegg, Bavarian nobleman
