= Mona Asuka Ott =

German pianist

- Born: 1991 (age 34–35); Munich
- Education: Mozarteum University of Salzburg
- Occupation: Pianist

Mona Asuka Ott (Japanese: モナ＝飛鳥・オット; born 1991) is a German-Japanese pianist and the younger sister of Alice Sara Ott.

== Early life and education ==
Mona Asuka Ott was born in Munich in 1991; her Japanese mother had studied piano in Tokyo and her father was a German civil engineer. She gave her first public performance on the piano at the age of four. She was taught, like her sister Alice Sara Ott, by Karl-Heinz Kämmerling at the Mozarteum University of Salzburg.

In 1997, at the age of six, she was rated sixth in Group 1 (Under 8) of the International Competition Classica Nova In Memoriam Dmitri Shostakovich (Hanover, 1997).

She won first prizes at the Grotrian-Steinweg competition in Brunswick; the Jugend Musiziert and at the EPTA International Piano Competition in Osijek.

She made her orchestral debut aged 13.

In 2006, she was a finalist at the 11th Hamamatsu International Piano Academy Competition in Hamamatsu (Japan). She also received the audience prize at the Kissinger Piano Olympics at Bad Kissingen.

In September 2008, she appeared in the special concert of the "Piano furioso" foundation in the Small Hall of the Laeiszhalle in Hamburg.

From 2009, she studied with Bernd Glemser at the University of Music Würzburg. She received several grants, including the Degussa Foundation and the Deutsche Stiftung Musikleben.

== Career ==
Mona Asuka Ott joined, among others, the Ruhr Piano Festival, the Festival de La Roque-d'Anthéron, the Festspiele Mecklenburg-Vorpommern, the Kissingen Sommer on Franconian Music Days and the Brunswick Classix Festival.

She has conducted orchestral performances with the Philharmonic State Orchestra of Halle – Staatskapelle Halle, the Hofer Symphoniker, the Württemberg Chamber Orchestra, the Yomiuri Nippon Symphony Orchestra, the Südwestdeutsche Philharmonie Konstanz and the Munich Symphony Orchestra.

== Discography ==
Mona Asuka's debut CD album was released on 28 July 2017 by the Oehms Classics label and featured the piano compositions of Franz Schubert and Franz Liszt. Tracks include:

- Schubert: 4 Impromptus. Recorded on 9–11 March 2017 at the Bavaria Musikstudios in Munich. Op. 90, D. 899: No. 1 in C minor, No. 2 in E-flat major, No. 3 in G-flat major, No. 4 in A-flat major.
- Liszt: Zwölf Lieder Von Franz Schubert. Recorded: 9–11 March 2017 at the Bavaria Musikstudios, Munich. 12 Lieder von Schubert, S. 558: No. 2, Auf dem Wasser zu singen; No. 3, Du bist die Ruh; No. 9, Ständchen von Shakespeare; No. 11, Der Wanderer.
- Liszt: Années de pèlerinage (Years of Pilgrimage), S.162 "Venezia e Napoli". Recorded on 9–11 March 2017 at Bavaria Musikstudios, Munich. Années de pèlerinage II, Supplément, S.162 "Venezia e Napoli": No. 1, Gondoliera; No. 2, Canzone; No. 3, Tarantella da Guillaume Louis Cottrau
