= Claire Huangci =

American classical pianist

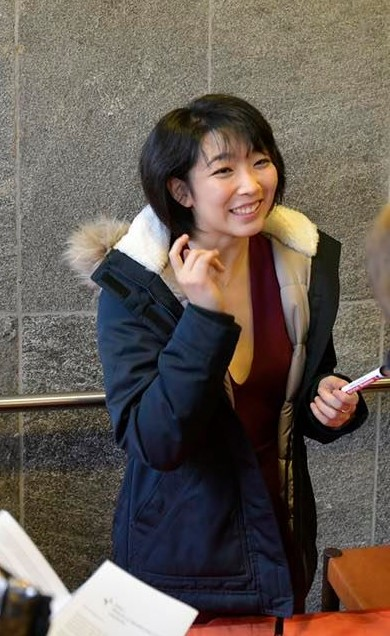
- Huangci at an autograph session in Lucerne 2019
- Born: March 22, 1990 (age 36); Rochester, New York, U.S.
- Education: Curtis Institute of Music
- Occupation: Pianist
- Years active: 1998–present
- Website: clairehuangci.com

Claire Huangci (Chinese: 黃慈; pinyin: Huáng Cí; born March 22, 1990) is an American classical pianist. She lives in Frankfurt am Main.

== Early life ==
Huangci was born in Rochester, New York to Chinese immigrant parents, both scientists. Claire started playing piano at the age of six. Until she was 11 years old, Huangci studied with pianist Ursula Ingolfsson-Fassbind at the Settlement Music School in Philadelphia. Aged 8, she won a gold medal at the World Piano Competition in Cincinnati, being the youngest medalist in the pre-college division to perform with an orchestra at the prize winners’ concert of the International division.

== Education ==
Huangci was supported with scholarships from DAAD and the Deutsche Stiftung Musikleben for two years. Having completed four years of study at the Curtis Institute of Music from 2003 to 2007, where she studied under Gary Graffman alongside notable pianists such as Yuja Wang, she continued her musical education in Germany at the Hochschule für Musik, Theater und Medien Hannover with Professor Arie Vardi from 2007 to 2016.

== Career ==
Huangci won First Prize in the 2009 Europäischer Chopin Klavierwettbewerb in Darmstadt and the Orpheum Music Prize in Zurich; the First and Special Prize at the 2010 National Chopin Competition in Miami, Florida, US, and the Second Prize at the 2011 ARD International Music Competition as its youngest participant. Huangci was also a finalist in the 2010 Queen Elisabeth Competition. In 2018 she won the Concours Géza Anda in Zurich.

=== Orchestras and performances ===
Huangci has appeared as a soloist performing with orchestras such as the Philadelphia Orchestra, the Indianapolis Symphony Orchestra, the Stuttgart Radio Symphony Orchestra under the direction of Sir Roger Norrington, the Berlin Symphony Orchestra, the Mozarteum Orchestra Salzburg, the Vancouver Symphony Orchestra, the Munich Chamber Orchestra, the China Philharmonic Orchestra, the Cannes Orchestre, the St. Petersburg Symphony, the Moscow Radio Symphony Orchestra, the Deutsche Streicherphilharmonie, the Brandenburgisches Staatsorchester Frankfurt, and the Santa Fe Symphony, as well as the Istanbul State Symphony Orchestra. She has performed in venues such as Carnegie Hall, Zürich Tonhalle, Konzerthaus Berlin, Gasteig Munich, Gewandhaus Leipzig, Salle Cortot Paris, Oji Hall in Tokyo and Symphony Hall in Osaka.

Additionally, she is a guest artist at festivals such as the Kissinger Sommer, Verbier, Ravinia, Łódź Rubinstein Festival, Menuhin Festival Gstaad, Mozartfest Würzburg and the Schwetzinger Festspiele.

== Discography ==
In the summer of 2013, Huangci released her solo debut recording of solo works by Tchaikovsky and Prokofiev under the Berlin Classics label. She released a second solo album in 2015 featuring sonatas by Scarlatti.

In 2019 she released a CD of concertos by Chopin and Paderewski.

In 2026, Huangci released Piano Heroines on the Alpha Classics label. The album features piano works by Fanny Hensel, Clara Wieck, Amy Beach and Florence Price. Cellist Tristan Cornut joins Huangci for the second movement of Clara Wieck's Piano Concerto in A minor, Op. 7. The album received a 2026 Annual Award from the German Record Critics' Award.

Publishing Date	Recording Date	Album title	Contents	Other Artists	Publisher	Catalogue No.
09.08.2013	2013	The Sleeping Beauty – Ballet Transcriptions	Pyotr Ilyich Tchaikovsky: The Sleeping Beauty, The Nutcracker (Act 2, No. 14); Sergei Prokofiev: Ten Pieces from Romeo and Juliet		Berlin Classics	0300548BC
10.04.2015	2015	Domenico Scarlatti – Piano Sonatas	Domenico Scarlatti: Piano sonatas		Berlin Classics	B00UILS96I
05.05.2017	2017	A Chopin Diary – The Complete Nocturnes	Frédéric Chopin: Nocturnes Nos. 1–21, Nocturne oubliée in C-sharp minor (Larghetto), Étude in C-sharp minor, Op. 25, No. 7	Tristan Cornut	Berlin Classics	B01LXE41EY
05.01.2018	2017		Dmitry Kabalevsky: Fantasy in F minor (based on Franz Schubert's Fantasia in F minor)	Radio-Symphonieorchester Wien conducted by Cornelius Meister	Berlin Classics	2531 126
23.02.2018	2017	Beethoven Rarities	Ludwig van Beethoven: Piano Concerto in D major, Op. 61a (transcription of the Violin Concerto), Musik zu einem Ritterballett Nos. 1–12, Wellington's Victory (Parts 1 and 2)	Brandenburgisches Staatsorchester Frankfurt conducted by Howard Griffiths	Rondeau	4-037408-01521-9
28.09.2018	2018	The Rachmaninoff Preludes	Sergei Rachmaninoff: Morceaux de fantaisie, Op. 3, No. 2; Preludes, Opp. 23 and 32		Berlin Classics	0301075BC
23.08.2019	2019	Paderewski and Chopin: Piano Concertos	Chopin: Piano Concerto No. 1 in E minor; Paderewski: Piano Concerto in A minor	Deutsche Radio Philharmonie conducted by Shiyeon Sung	Berlin Classics	B07T4RYMLT
14.08.2020	2020	Trio Machiavelli: Ravel and Chausson	Maurice Ravel: Piano Trio in A minor; Ernest Chausson: Piano Quartet in A major, Op. 30	Solenne Païdassi, Tristan Cornut, Adrien Boisseau	Berlin Classics	
19.03.2021	2020	Pastorale	Beethoven: Symphony No. 6, Op. 68, "Pastoral" (arranged by Liszt)		Berlin Classics	
30.04.2021	2020	Cipriani Potter: Orchestral Works	Symphony No. 1 in G minor; Introduction and Rondo alla militaire for piano and orchestra in E-flat major	BBC National Orchestra of Wales conducted by Howard Griffiths	CPO	B0915V5NNB
10.09.2021	2021	Johann Sebastian Bach: Toccatas and Fugues	Toccata in D minor, transcribed by Busoni from BWV 565; Toccatas BWV 910–916		Berlin Classics	0302016BC
18.02.2022	2021	Mendelssohn: Works for Violin and Piano	Concerto for Violin, Piano and String Orchestra in D minor; Violin Sonata in F minor, Op. 4; Violin Sonata in F major (first version, 1838)	Marc Bouchkov (violin); Howard Griffiths (conductor)	Berlin Classics	
17.03.2023	2023	Beethoven: Septet and Eroica	Beethoven: Symphony No. 3 in E-flat major, Op. 55, "Eroica"; Septet in E-flat major, Op. 20	CHAARTS Chamber Artists	Berlin Classics	
12.05.2023	2021	Mozart: Piano Concertos Nos. 15, 16 and 17	Wolfgang Amadeus Mozart: Piano Concertos Nos. 15, 16 and 17	Mozarteum Orchestra Salzburg conducted by Howard Griffiths	Alpha Classics	ALPHA928
20.08.2023	2023	META	Franz Schubert: Piano Sonatas D. 894, D. 958, D. 959 and D. 960; Drei Klavierstücke D. 946; four songs, Aufenthalt and Liebesbotschaft, transcribed by Franz Liszt	Thomas Bauer	Berlin Classics	
20.09.2024	2024	Made in USA: Gershwin, Beach & Barber	George Gershwin: Rhapsody in Blue; Amy Beach: Variations on Balkan Themes, Op. 60; Samuel Barber: Piano Sonata, Op. 26; Earl Wild: seven virtuoso études after Gershwin		Alpha Classics	ALPHA1071
30.01.2026		Piano Heroines	Piano works by Fanny Hensel, Clara Wieck, Amy Beach and Florence Price	Tristan Cornut (cello, on Clara Wieck's Piano Concerto in A minor, Op. 7, second movement)	Alpha Classics	ALPHA1231
