= Mateusz Molęda =

German conductor

- Born: December 4, 1986 (age 39); Dresden, Germany
- Website: www.mateuszmoleda.de

Mateusz Krzysztof Maksymilian Molęda (born December 4, 1986) is a German-Polish conductor.

== Life ==
Molęda was born in Dresden, Germany, into a family of musicians. His parents, Alicja Borkowska-Molęda (born January 27, 1952) and Krzysztof Molęda (born April 6, 1953), are both opera singers and have sung title and leading roles at European opera houses for more than two decades, including the Semper Opera House, the Komische Oper Berlin, the Deutsche Oper Berlin, the Leipzig Opera, the Royal Danish Theatre and the Prague State Opera. Molęda holds both German and Polish citizenships.

== Education ==
Molęda began playing the piano at the age of six and studied at the Hanover University of Music, Drama and Media in the class of Arie Vardi, considered one of the world's most distinguished music pedagogues. He continued his studies also in the area of Early music and Historically informed performance practice with Zvi Meniker, one of the last pupils of Nikolaus Harnoncourt and Malcolm Bilson.

In 2021, Molęda obtained his PhD at the Krzysztof Penderecki Academy of Music in Kraków with a thesis on polyphonic compositional techniques in Sergei Rachmaninoff's Symphony No. 2.

Molęda has received important musical impulses from his mentor Marek Janowski, for whom he also worked on personal request as an assistant with the Berlin Philharmonic, the Berlin Radio Symphony Orchestra, the Frankfurt Radio Symphony and the Dresden Philharmonic. By sharing his varied experiences, Janowski has profoundly influenced Molęda's artistic development in the spirit of the traditional German conducting school. Further musical inspiration came from his work with and as a cover conductor for Teodor Currentzis and the SWR Symphonieorchester, which he accompanied on several European tours.

Molęda has been a recipient of scholarships from the German Music Council, the German Society for the Exploitation of Ancillary Copyrights, the Theodor Rogler Foundation, the Anna Ruths Foundation, the Robert Richard Jaudes Foundation and the International Forum for Culture and Economy Dresden.

== Competitions ==
In October 2023, Molęda won the 1st Prize and the Special Prize of the Orchestra by secret and from the jury's verdict independent vote of the orchestra musicians at the 3rd International Sergei Kussewitzky Conducting Competition.

== Collaboration with orchestras ==
Molęda conducted an orchestra for the first time at the age of nineteen. He has guest conducted renowned orchestras in more than ten countries around the world, including the United Kingdom, Germany, Denmark, Italy, Poland, Hungary, Albania, South Korea, Peru, South Africa and Canada. He has worked among others with the Staatskapelle Dresden, the Deutsche Radio Philharmonie Saarbrücken Kaiserslautern, the Dortmund Philharmonic Orchestra, the Orchestra of the Komische Oper Berlin, the Nuremberg Symphony Orchestra, the Württemberg Chamber Orchestra Heilbronn, the London Mozart Players, the Aarhus Symfoniorkester, the Odense Symfoniorkester, the Warsaw Philharmonic, the Polish National Radio Symphony Orchestra, the Belgrade Philharmonic Orchestra, the Hamilton Philharmonic Orchestra, and the Orchestre de Chambre du Luxembourg.

== Notable concerts ==
Molęda attracted attention throughout Germany with his performance of Beethoven's Choral Fantasy at the German government's celebration of the German Unity Day on October 3, 2007. The concert was broadcast live by ZDF and was seen by more than eight million viewers.

On June 10, 2016, Molęda conducted a German-Polish friendship concert on the occasion of the 800th anniversary of the city of Koszalin, where musicians from the Nuremberg Symphony Orchestra and the Koszalin Philharmonic Orchestra shared the stage. During this concert, the Symphonic Pictures Op. 19 by Karl Adolf Lorenz were premiered. The event was the subject of a television documentary for BR Fernsehen entitled Die doppelte Heimat.

On November 8, 2018, Molęda conducted the world premiere of Danish composer Anders Koppel's Concerto for Hammond Organ, the first ever composition of this genre.

== Teaching activities ==
Since 2022 Molęda holds a teaching position at the Mannheim University of Music and Performing Arts. As part of his teaching duties, he also leads the seminar Introduction to Working with Conductors.

== Activity as lecturer ==
In addition to his work as a conductor, Molęda gives lectures throughout Germany on the topic of United in Diversity - How Music Strengthens the Bonds Between Europeans, including at the Forum Heiligenberg of the Schloss Heiligenberg Seeheim-Jugenheim Foundation and the Hessian State Center for Political Education in Wiesbaden.

== TV and radio recordings ==
Numerous radio and television recordings are available, including for BR Klassik, MDR Kultur, DR 2, KBS, BR Fernsehen, MDR Fernsehen, H1, Sachsen Fernsehen, MBC and the streaming platform Vialma.

== CD releases (selection) ==
- 2010: Flügelschwingen (piano works by Scarlatti, Mozart, Schumann and Chopin)

== Personal life ==
Molęda lives in Felm, Schleswig-Holstein. He is fluent in German, Polish, English, French and Russian. He is an avid golfer and has been actively involved in team sports and as a board member of the Dresden Elbflorenz Golf Club and the Burgwedel Golf Club. An enthusiastic archer, he is a member of the archery division of the SV Felm.
