= Severin von Eckardstein =

German classical pianist (born 1978)

Severin von Eckardstein (born 1 August 1978) is a German classical pianist.

He was born in Düsseldorf, and took his first piano lessons when he was six years old.

At the age of 12, he was accepted into a young-talent class at the Robert Schumann Hochschule in Düsseldorf. During his school years, von Eckardstein continued his piano studies in Hannover and in Salzburg with Karl-Heinz Kämmerling.

After his graduation, he attended the Berlin University of the Arts to take lessons from Klaus Hellwig. In 2000, he made a strong impression at the Leeds International Pianoforte Competition: he was placed third.

After receiving his degree in 2002, he continued his studies at the International Piano Academy Lake Como, in Italy. He won the 2003 Queen Elisabeth Competition in Brussels, Belgium.
