= Dasol Kim =

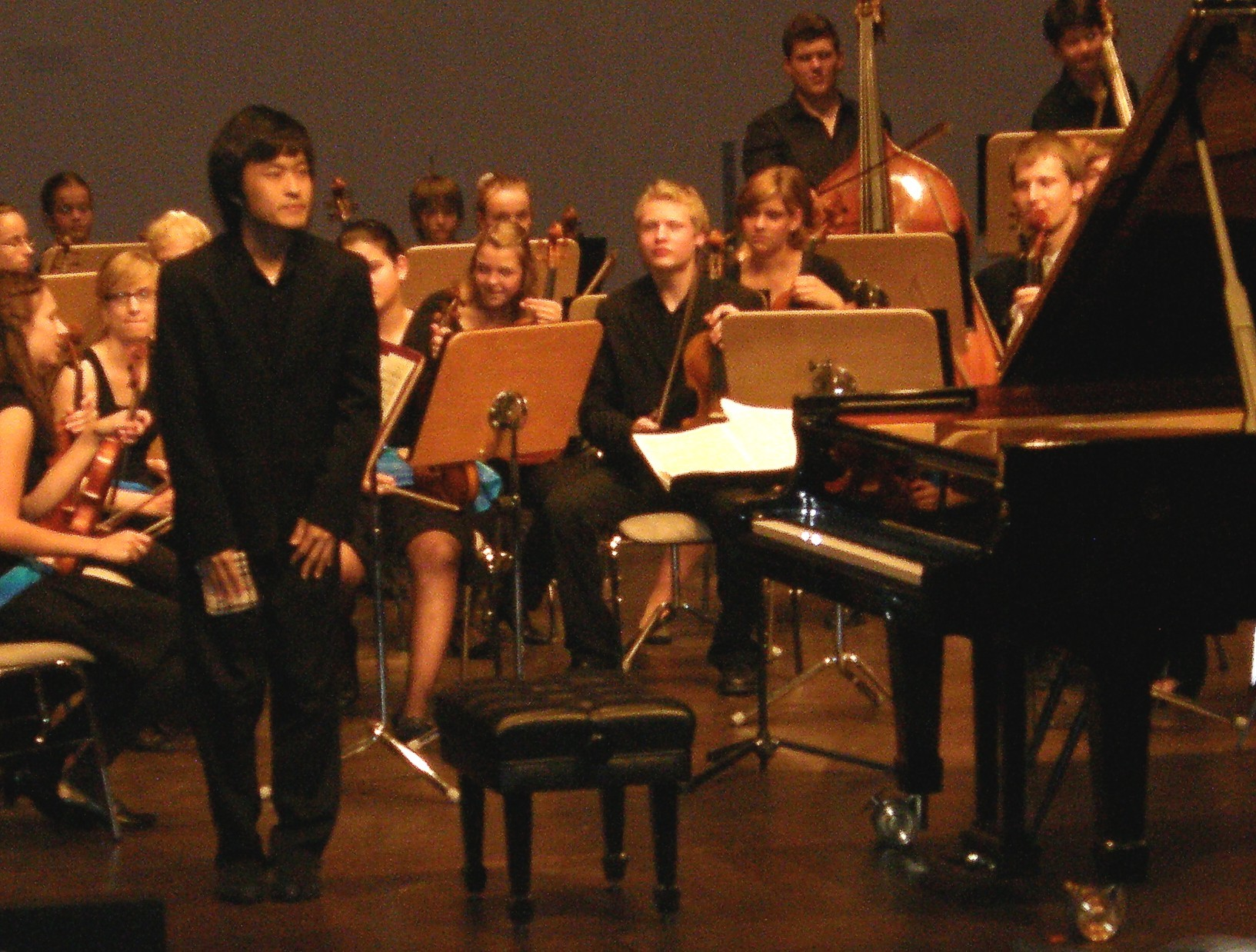
- Dasol Kim in 2011

Background information
- Born: 1989 (age 36–37); Busan, South Korea
- Instruments: Piano
- Label: Deutsche Grammophon
- Website: dasolkim.de

Dasol Kim (born 1989) is a South Korean pianist.

Born in Busan, Kim started playing the piano at the age of 11, and by 15, he won his first international competition and left for Germany. He is a graduate of Hochschule für Musik, Theater und Medien Hannover and studied with Arie Vardi.

Kim won the Young Concert Artists International Auditions in Leipzig in 2010 and in New York in 2015. He won the sixth prize in the 2010 Queen Elisabeth Competition in Brussels, Belgium. Additionally, he won First Prize in the 2011 Epinal International Piano Competition in France, and Second Prize in the 2012 Concours Géza Anda in Switzerland. In 2012, he also won the Kissinger Klavierolymp, the piano competition of the festival Kissinger Sommer. He won a Jury Discretionary Award at the 2017 Van Cliburn International Piano Competition in the United States; Fort Worth Star-Telegram enthusiastically wrote that Kim "dominated" in his preliminary round recital. In 2015, Dasol Kim held the Mortimer Levitt Piano Chair of Young Concert Artists. In 2021, he won Second Prize in the International Beethoven Piano Competition Vienna.

Kim has appeared as soloist with such orchestras as the New York Philharmonic, the Fort Worth Symphony Orchestra, the Tonhalle Orchestra Zurich, the Berlin Konzerthaus Orchestra, the Bavarian Radio Symphony Orchestra, the Orchestre de la Suisse Romande, the Brandenburg Chamber Orchestra, the MDR Leipzig Radio Symphony Orchestra, Concerto Budapest, and the Belgium National Orchestra. He has been engaged to perform the complete Beethoven piano sonatas in Switzerland and Korea.

Kim's debut album, of works by Robert Schumann, was released on Deutsche Grammophon in 2015. In 2023, another album, of works by Franz Schubert, was released on French label Aparté.

Dasol Kim lives in Berlin.
