= Hiroshima Symphony Orchestra =

Orchestra based in Japan

The Hiroshima Symphony Orchestra (広島交響楽団, Hiroshima Kōkyō Gakudan) is an orchestra based in Hiroshima, Japan, founded in 1963. It is the only professional orchestra in Japan's Chūgoku region.

== Music Directors ==
- Akeo Watanabe (1984–86)
- Ken Takaseki (1986–90)
- Yoshikazu Tanaka (1990–94)
- Naohiro Totsuka (1994–98)
- Norichika Iimori, Hiroyuki Odano, Kazumasa Watanabe (1995–2002)
- Hong-Jae Kim (2002–04)
- Kazuyoshi Akiyama (1998–present)
- Tatsuya Shimono (Designate– Starting April 2017)

== History ==
- Founded as the "Hiroshima Civic Orchestra" in 1963.
- Renamed the "Hiroshima Symphony Orchestra" in 1969.
- Became a professional orchestra in 1972.
- Akeo Watanabe inaugurated as the music director and the permanent conductor in 1984.
- Held UN peace concerts in Vienna and Prague in 1991.
- Held concerts at the Tokyo Metropolitan Theatre in Tokyo and The Symphony Hall in Osaka in 1993.
- Performed for the opening events of the 12th Asian Games in Hiroshima in 1994.
- In the 149th regular concert, performed Krzysztof Penderecki's "Threnody to the Victims of Hiroshima" in 1994.
- Performed Toshio Hosokawa's "Hiroshima Requiem" and Ikuma Dan's "Symphony No.6 'Hiroshima' to support world peace in 1995.
- Started their forum to develop the ideal picture of the local symphony for the 21st century in 1997.
- Started the RCC TV program "Hiroshima symphony" in 1997.
- Performed Beethoven's Symphony No.5 and other works for the October in Normandy (the events with classical and modern music) in Normandy in 1997.
- Performed Toshio Hosokawa's "Memory of the Sea" in 1998.
- Kazuyoshi Akiyama was inaugurated as the first conductor in 1998.
- Held the international music festival "August in Hiroshima '99" and performed Mahler's "Symphony No.2" in 1999.
- Performed in the 3rd orchestra festival for local cities in Japan at Sumida Triphony Hall in 2000.
- Held the 200th regular concert and performed Ottorino Respighi's "The Roman trilogy (Fontane di Roma, Pini di Roma, Feste Romane)" in 2000.
- Performed Eduard Tubin's "Symphony No.3 in D minor 'Heroic'" in 2002.
- Performed in the orchestra festival for local cities in Japan in 2003.
- Performed at the St. Petersburg Philharmonic Large Hall to celebrate the 300th Anniversary of Saint Petersburg and receiving a medal from UNESCO in 2003.
- Performed in Seoul, Busan, and Daegu to celebrate Korea-Japan Friendship Year in 2005.
- Founded the Hiroshima United with Hiroshima Toyo Carp and Sanfrecce Hiroshima in 2007.

== See also ==
- List of symphony orchestras
