= Aaron Pilsan =

Austrian pianist

- Born: 1995 (age 30–31); Dornbirn, Austria
- Occupation: Classical pianist

Aaron Pilsan (born 1995, in Dornbirn) is an Austrian pianist.

Pilsan started to learn the piano at the age of five. As a teenager he studied under Karl-Heinz Kämmerling, and subsequently became a pupil of Lars Vogt. His inclusion in the Rising Star programme of the European Concert Hall Organisation saw him receive a number of recital engagements while still in his teens. In 2014, at the age of 19, Naïve Records released his debut recording, featuring works by Beethoven and Schubert. Gramophone's reviewer Bryce Morrison praised Pilsan for using "his remarkable agility to a purely musical end" in Schubert's Wandererfantasie. Aaron Pilsan has been supported by the Swiss foundation "Orpheum" since 2015 and he became a scholar of the "Mozart Gesellschaft Dortmund" in the same year. In August 2017, he was awarded the "Förderpreis Deutschlandfunk". In early 2018, Deutsche Grammophon released "HOME", a musical tribute to Aaron Pilsan's hometown in Vorarlberg, Austria together with long-time duo partner, cellist and friend Kian Soltani. The Album features the works of Schubert, Schumann and Reza Vali.
