= Kazuyoshi Akiyama =

Japanese conductor (1941–2025)

- 秋山 和慶
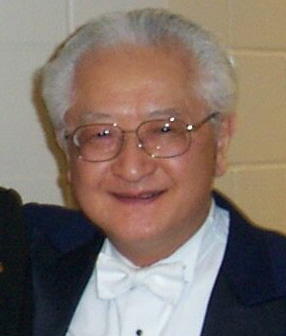
- Akiyama in 2005
- Born: January 2, 1941; Tokyo, Japan
- Died: January 26, 2025; Tokyo, Japan
- Education: Toho Gakuen School of Music
- Occupation: Conductor
- Organizations: Tokyo Symphony Orchestra; Vancouver Symphony Orchestra; Syracuse Symphony Orchestra; Hiroshima Symphony Orchestra
- Awards: Suntory Music Award; Order of the Rising Sun

Kazuyoshi Akiyama (秋山 和慶, Akiyama Kazuyoshi; January 2, 1941 – January 26, 2025) was a Japanese conductor who held conducting posts of symphony orchestras in Japan, Canada and the U.S., such as the Tokyo Symphony Orchestra from 1964 for life, the Vancouver Symphony Orchestra from 1972 to 1985, the Syracuse Symphony Orchestra from 1985 to 1993, and the Hiroshima Symphony Orchestra from 1998. Akiyama conducted the Tokyo Symphony Orchestra in the Japanese premieres of Schoenberg's Moses und Aron, John Adams's El Niño and Helmut Lachenmann's Das Mädchen mit den Schwefelhölzern, among others.

== Life and career ==
Born into a musical family, Akiyama studied piano first with his mother, who was a professional piano teacher, from age three. At age 15, he began studying piano at the Toho Gakuen School of Music. He also studied French horn and percussion. He was fascinated by the conducting activities of a fellow student, Seiji Ozawa, and decided to study conducting with Hideo Saito.

=== Tokyo Symphony Orchestra ===
In 1964, Akiyama made his debut with the Tokyo Symphony Orchestra; he was named the orchestra's music director and permanent conductor a few months later. With the Tokyo Symphony, he conducted several works by European composers in Japanese first performances by Japanese performers, such as Schoenberg's Moses und Aron in 1994. He introduced Schoenberg's Die Jakobsleiter and a staged performance of Janáček's The Cunning Little Vixen in 1997, a concert performance of Helmut Lachenmann's Das Mädchen mit den Schwefelhölzern, a Czech version of Janáček's Káťa Kabanová in 2000, and John Adams' El Niño oratorio in 2003. He was named the orchestra's conductor laureate in 2004.

=== Other posts ===
Akiyama became known outside Japan first by a tour of the orchestra of the Toho Gakuen School of Music to the U.S. and Europe. He became assistant conductor of the Toronto Symphony Orchestra in the 1968/69 season. He was music director of the Vancouver Symphony Orchestra (VSO) from 1972 to 1985 (then conductor laureate). During his tenure, the orchestra moved from the Queen Elizabeth Theatre to the improved Orpheum. He took the VSO to tours in Japan twice, and also toured within Canada and the U.S. His programs offered many Vancouver premieres by Canadian, Japanese and international composers. He commissioned Jean Coulthard from Vancouver to compose Canada Mosaic for concerts in Asia, requesting solos for all principal players in the orchestra.

Akiyama was music director of the American Symphony Orchestra from 1973 to 1978 and served as music director of the Syracuse Symphony Orchestra from 1985 to 1993. He returned to Japan in 1995 to become principal conductor and music advisor of the Hiroshima Symphony Orchestra. He became an honorary conductor for life when he left. He led the National Youth Orchestra of Canada on a 1998 tour to Japan, and conducted them again on a 2000 tour in Canada.

=== Personal life ===
On January 23, 2025, Akiyama's family and management announced his retirement from conducting following severe spinal cord damage caused by a fall at his home on January 1. He died from pneumonia on January 26, at the age of 84.

== Awards ==
Akiyama received the 1975 Suntory Music Award. In 2001, he was awarded the Purple Ribbon medal from the Japanese Government for his outstanding contribution to the country's musical culture. He received the Order of the Rising Sun with gold rays with rosette in 2011, and was named the Person of Cultural Merit in 2014.

Other awards included the Osaka Citizens Theater Award in 1989, the Osaka Arts Prize in 1991, the Arts Encouragement Prize of the Minister of Education in 1995, the Kawasaki City Cultural Prize 2007, and the Hiroshima Citizens Award in 2008. He received the Chugoku Cultural Award from Chugoku Shimbun newspaper and the special award for distinguished service from the Tokushima Prefecture government in 2014, and the Akeo Watanabe Music Foundation Special Award in 2015. He received awards together with the Tokyo Symphony Orchestra, including the Kyoto Music Award in 1993, the Mainichi Arts Award in 1994, the Mobile Music Award in 1996, and the Suntory Music Award in 1997.
