= Mitsuko Uchida =

Japanese-English pianist and conductor

Dame Mitsuko Uchida DBE
- 内田光子
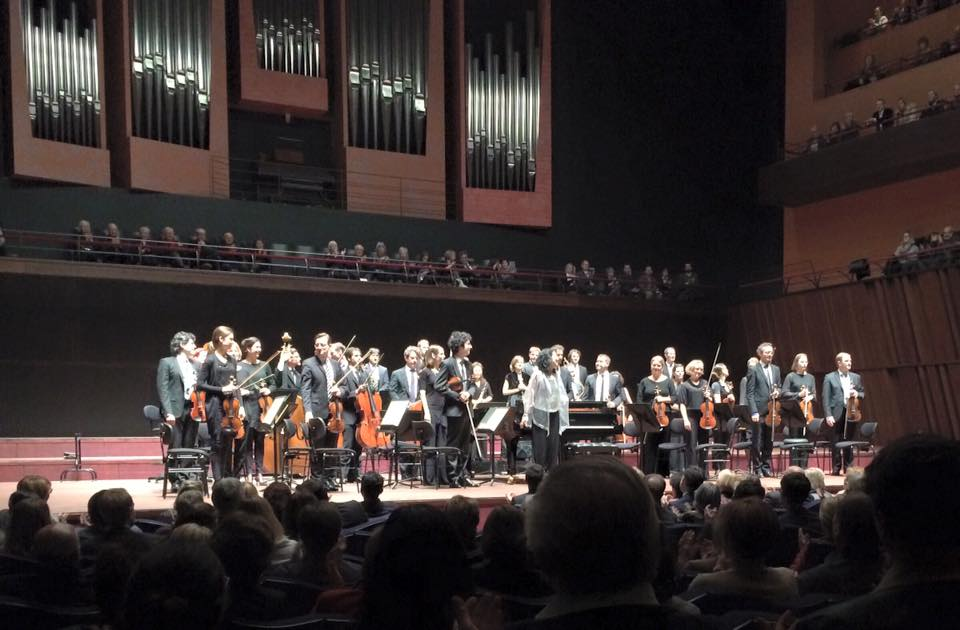
- Uchida with the Mahler Chamber Orchestra, 2016
- Born: 20 December 1948 (age 77); Atami, Shizuoka Prefecture, Japan
- Citizenship: United Kingdom
- Occupations: Classical pianist, conductor
- Years active: 1972–present
- Title: Co-artistic director of the Marlboro Music School and Festival (with Jonathan Biss)
- Partner: Robert Cooper
- Website: mitsukouchida.com

Dame Mitsuko Uchida (内田光子; [ɯtɕida miꜜtsɯ̥ko]; born 20 December 1948) is a Japanese-English classical pianist and conductor. Born in Japan and naturalised in England, she is particularly notable for her interpretations of Mozart, Beethoven and Schubert.

She has appeared with many notable orchestras, recorded a wide repertory with several labels, won numerous awards and honours (including Dame Commander of the Order of the British Empire in 2009) and is the co-artistic director, with Jonathan Biss, of the Marlboro Music School and Festival. She has also conducted several major orchestras.

== Life and career ==
Born in Atami, a seaside town close to Tokyo, Japan, Uchida moved to Vienna, Austria, with her diplomat parents when she was 12 years old, after her father was named the Japanese ambassador to Austria. She is the youngest of three children. She enrolled at the Vienna Academy of Music to study with Richard Hauser and later Wilhelm Kempff and Stefan Askenase. She gave her first Viennese recital at the age of 14 at the Vienna Musikverein. Uchida also studied with Maria Curcio, the last and favourite pupil of Artur Schnabel. She remained in Vienna to study when her father was transferred back to Japan after five years.

She was awarded tenth prize at the Queen Elisabeth Music Competition in 1968, playing Beethoven, Debussy, and Gaston Brenta in the finals. In 1969 Uchida won the first prize in the International Beethoven Piano Competition Vienna and in 1970 the second prize in the VIII International Chopin Piano Competition. In 1975, she won second prize in the Leeds Piano Competition.

In 1998 Uchida was the music director of the Ojai Music Festival in conjunction with the conductor and violinist David Zinman.

She is an acclaimed interpreter of the works of Mozart, Beethoven, Schubert, Chopin, Debussy and Schoenberg. She has recorded all of Mozart's piano sonatas (a project that won the Gramophone Award in 1989) and concerti, the latter with the English Chamber Orchestra, conducted by Jeffrey Tate. Her recording of the Schoenberg Piano Concerto with Pierre Boulez won another Gramophone Award. Uchida is further noted for her recordings of Beethoven's complete piano concerti with Kurt Sanderling conducting, Beethoven's late piano sonatas, and a Schubert piano cycle. She is also respected as a distinguished interpreter of the works of the Second Viennese School.

Her 2009 recording of the Mozart piano concertos nos. 23 and 24, in which she conducted the Cleveland Orchestra as well as playing the solo part, won the Grammy Award in 2011. This recording was the start of a project to record all the Mozart piano concertos for a second time, conducting the Cleveland Orchestra from the piano. Further recordings for this project were released in 2011, 2012 and 2014.

From 2002 to 2007 she was artist-in-residence for the Cleveland Orchestra, where she led performances of all Mozart's solo piano concertos. She has also conducted the English Chamber Orchestra, from the keyboard. In 2010, she was artist-in-residence for the Berlin Philharmonic. She was senior artist at the Marlboro Music School and Festival in 1974 and 1992, and has been permanently associated with Marlboro since 1994 when she became a member of the Committee for Artistic Direction. In 1999 she became one of two artistic directors along with fellow pianist Richard Goode. She served as the sole director until 2018 when Marlboro Music announced that American pianist Jonathan Biss would assume the role of co-artistic director. She is also a founding trustee of the Borletti-Buitoni Trust, an organisation established to help young artists develop and sustain international careers. In May 2012, the Royal Philharmonic Society announced that she would be honoured with their Gold Medal (she received the society's annual Music Award in 2003); previous recipients have included Johannes Brahms (1877), Frederick Delius and Sir Edward Elgar (1925), Richard Strauss (1936), Igor Stravinsky (1954), Benjamin Britten and Leonard Bernstein (1987).

Her 2015 performance with the Cleveland Orchestra elicited this review from the Cleveland Plain Dealer:

Call it the mark of a master. Just when Mitsuko Uchida was starting to seem predictable, the goddess of purity, the pianist goes and exhibits another persona altogether. Performing Mozart again with the Cleveland Orchestra Thursday, the pianist-conductor treated listeners to a heartier, more robust version of her art. More than just the layout of the strings, she rearranged, in a refreshing manner, her very sound.

Her 2022 recording of Beethoven's Diabelli Variations was nominated for a Grammy for Best Classical Instrumental Solo and won a Gramophone Piano Award.

On 2 July 2024, The Times published a letter to the editor, co-signed by Uchida and numerous other Catholic and non-Catholic public figures, calling upon the Holy See to preserve what they describe as the "magnificent" cultural artifact of the Catholic Church's Traditional Latin Mass.

== Honours and awards ==
- 1986: Suntory Music Award
- 1989: Gramophone Award for Best Instrumental Recording, for her set of the complete Piano Sonatas of Wolfgang Amadeus Mozart
- 2001: Appointed Honorary Commander of the Order of the British Empire (CBE) in the 2001 New Year Honours. At the time, the award was honorary because she was not yet a citizen of the United Kingdom.
- 2001: Gramophone Award for Best Concerto Recording, for her recording of the piano concerto of Arnold Schoenberg (with Pierre Boulez conducting)
- 2003: Uchida was elected an international member of the American Philosophical Society
- 2008: In April, BBC Music Magazine presented her its awards for Instrumentalist of the Year, and Disc of the Year (Beethoven's Hammerklavier Sonata).
- 2009: She was promoted to Dame Commander of the Order of the British Empire (DBE) in the 2009 Queen's Birthday Honours. On this occasion, the award was substantive, as she had become a British citizen.
- 2009: In June, she was awarded an honorary Doctor of Music (DMus) degree by the University of Oxford during Encaenia 2009.
- 2011: Grammy Award for Best Instrumental Soloist(s) Performance (with orchestra) for her recording of Mozart's Piano Concerti No. 23 K. 488 and No. 24 K. 491 with the Cleveland Orchestra, which she conducted from the keyboard.
- 2012: in May, Uchida was awarded the Royal Philharmonic Society Gold Medal, one of the highest honours in classical music.
- 2015: in January, Uchida was awarded the Gold Medal of the Foundation (Stiftung) of the Mozarteum University of Salzburg
- 2015: Praemium Imperiale, awarded by the imperial family of Japan
- 2017: Grammy Award for the Best Classical Solo Vocal Album (as accompanist) with Dorothea Röschmann
- 2022: Gramophone Classical Music Awards – Piano Category (Beethoven Diabelli Variations)
- 2024: Honorary Academic of the Accademia Nazionale di Santa Cecilia.
- 2026: Uchida "was announced today [October 1] as recipient of [Denmark's] biggest arts award — the Léonie Sonning Music Prize, worth DKK 1 million (US $150,000)."
