= Concours Géza Anda =

Triennial piano competition in Switzerland

The Concours Géza Anda is a triennial international piano competition in Zürich, Switzerland. It was founded in memory of Hungarian pianist Géza Anda by his widow Hortense Anda-Bührle. The purpose of the competition is to discover and promote young pianists who will pass on the musical spirit of Géza Anda. The Géza Anda Foundation provides winners with free concert management for three years after the competition (up to 200 engagements).

== Winners ==
Ed.	Year	First prize	Second prize	Third prize
1st	1979	(France) Georges Pludermacher		
2nd	1982	(West Germany) Heidrun Holtmann	(Taiwan) Hung-Kuan Chen	(France) Laurent Cabasso
3rd	1985	(not awarded)	tie: (Japan) Yukino Fujiwara and (Turkey) Hüseyin Sermet	(West Germany) Michael Endres
4th	1988	(West Germany) Konstanze Eickhorst	(Japan) Yukino Fujiwara	(Brazil) Ricardo Castro
5th	1991	(Hungary) Dénes Várjon	(Soviet Union) Konstantin Scherbakov	(Germany) Matthias Kirschnereit
6th	1994	(Italy) Pietro De Maria	(Japan) Yoshiko Iwai	(Italy) Luca Ballerini
7th	1997	(Italy) Corrado Rollero	(Russia) Roustem Saitkoulov	(Japan) Yuka Imamine
8th	2000	(Italy) Filippo Gamba	(Finland) Henri Sigfridsson	(Russia) Andrey Shibko
9th	2003	(Russia) Alexei Volodin	(Russia) Sergey Kuznetsov	(Japan) Hisako Kawamura
9th	2003	Mozart–Schumann Prize: (Austria) Christoph Berner		
10th	2006	(Russia) Sergey Koudriakov	(Russia) Nikolai Tokarev	(Japan) Tomomi Okumura
10th	2006	Géza Anda Prize: (Kazakhstan) Stanislav Khegai		
11th	2009	(South Korea) Jinsang Lee	(Russia) Alexei Zuev	(Russia) Tatiana Kolesova
11th	2009	Jinsang Lee also won Audience Prize, Mozart Prize, and Schumann Prize.		
12th	2012	(Russia) Varvara Nepomnyashchaya	(South Korea) Dasol Kim	(Russia) Elmar Gasanov
12th	2012	Elmar Gasanov also won Schumann Prize.		
13th	2015	(United States) Andrew Tyson	(Russia) Aleksandr Shaikin	(Brazil) Rolando Rolim
14th	2018	(United States) Claire Huangci	(South Korea) Jong Hai Park	(Russia) Sergey Tanin
15th	2021	(Germany) Anton Gerzenberg	(United Kingdom) Julian Trevelyan	(Czech Republic) Marek Kozák
15th	2021	Julian Trevelyan also won Audience Prize and Mozart Prize		
16th	2024	(Russia) Ilya Shmukler	tie: (Latvia) Dumants Liepins and (Russia) Dmitry Yudin	(not awarded)
16th	2024	Ilya Shmukler also won Audience Prize, Mozart Prize, Special Price of the Hungarian Radio Arts Group, and Junior Jury Prize		
