= International Beethoven Piano Competition Vienna =

Piano competition

- Current: 17th International Beethoven Piano Competition Vienna
- Venue: Wiener Musikverein, Vienna, Austria
- First award: 1961; 65 years ago
- Website: beethoven-comp.at

The International Beethoven Piano Competition Vienna is a quadrennial piano competition held at the Vienna Musikverein. Founded by the University of Music and Performing Arts Vienna (mdw), it is the oldest international piano competition in Austria. It became a member of the World Federation of International Music Competitions in 1958.

The exclusive focus on the piano works of Ludwig van Beethoven distinguishes the competition from most major international piano contests, which typically feature broader repertoire requirements. Notable past winners include Mitsuko Uchida and Stefan Vladar. The first prize includes a Bösendorfer 214 VC concert grand and a 30,000 euro cash prize. The 17th edition of the competition attracted 300 candidates from 32 different nations.

== Round structure ==
The competition is composed of a preselection, one online round, two recital rounds, and a final orchestral performance. The works chosen for the live rounds can be identical with those played in the online video round or preselection videos. Competitors must prepare two concertos for the final round, although only one will be played. This decision is at the jury's discretion.

== Prizewinners ==
Edition	Year	1st prize	2nd prize	3rd prize
16th	2021	(Germany) Aris Alexander Blettenberg	(South Korea) Dasol Kim (ex aequo)	not awarded
16th	2021	(Germany) Aris Alexander Blettenberg	(Austria) Philipp Scheucher (ex aequo)	not awarded
15th	2017	(Italy) Rodolfo Leone	(South Korea) Sahun Hong	(China) Bolai Cao
14th	2013	(Russia) Maria Mazo	(Russia) Andrey Gugnin (ex aequo)	not awarded
14th	2013	(Russia) Maria Mazo	(Austria) Valentin Fheodoroff (ex aequo)	not awarded
13th	2009	(Germany) Alexander Schimpf	not awarded	(South Korea) Chi-Ho Han
13th	2009	(Germany) Alexander Schimpf	not awarded	(South Korea) Ji-Hoon Jun
12th	2005	(Romania) Herbert Schuch	(Lithuania) Gabrielius Alenka	(Russia) Peter Ovtscharov
11th	2001	(Germany) Oliver Kern	(Austria) Christopher Hinterhuber	(Germany) Ingo Dannhorn
10th	1997	(Finland) Antti Siirala	(Austria) Christoph Berner	(Japan) Ikuko Nishiyama
9th	1993	(United Kingdom) Leon Francis McCawley	(Italy) Filippo Gamba (ex aequo)	not awarded
9th	1993	(United Kingdom) Leon Francis McCawley	(Germany) Martin Zehn (ex aequo)	not awarded
8th	1989	(Serbia) Jasminka Stancul	not awarded	not awarded
7th	1985	(Austria) Stefan Vladar	(Russia) Pavel Nersessian	(Germany) Stephan Möller
6th	1981	(Lebanon) Avedis Kouyoumdjian	(United Kingdom) Ian Hobson	(Argentina) Daniel Rivera
5th	1977	(Russia) Natalia Pankova	(Brazil) Edson Elias	(Russia) (Australia) Natasha Vlassenko
4th	1973	(Republic of Ireland) John O'Conor	(Turkey) Seta Tanyel	(Mexico) Oscar Tarrago
3rd	1969	(Japan) Mitsuko Uchida	(Russia) Oxana Yablonskaya	(Switzerland) Verena Pfenninger
2nd	1965	(United States) Lois Carole Pachucki	(United States) Edward Auer	(Brazil) João Carlos Assis Brasil
1st	1961	not awarded	(Germany) Dieter Weber	(Colombia) Blanca Uribe
