= Valentina Babor =

German classical pianist (born 1989)

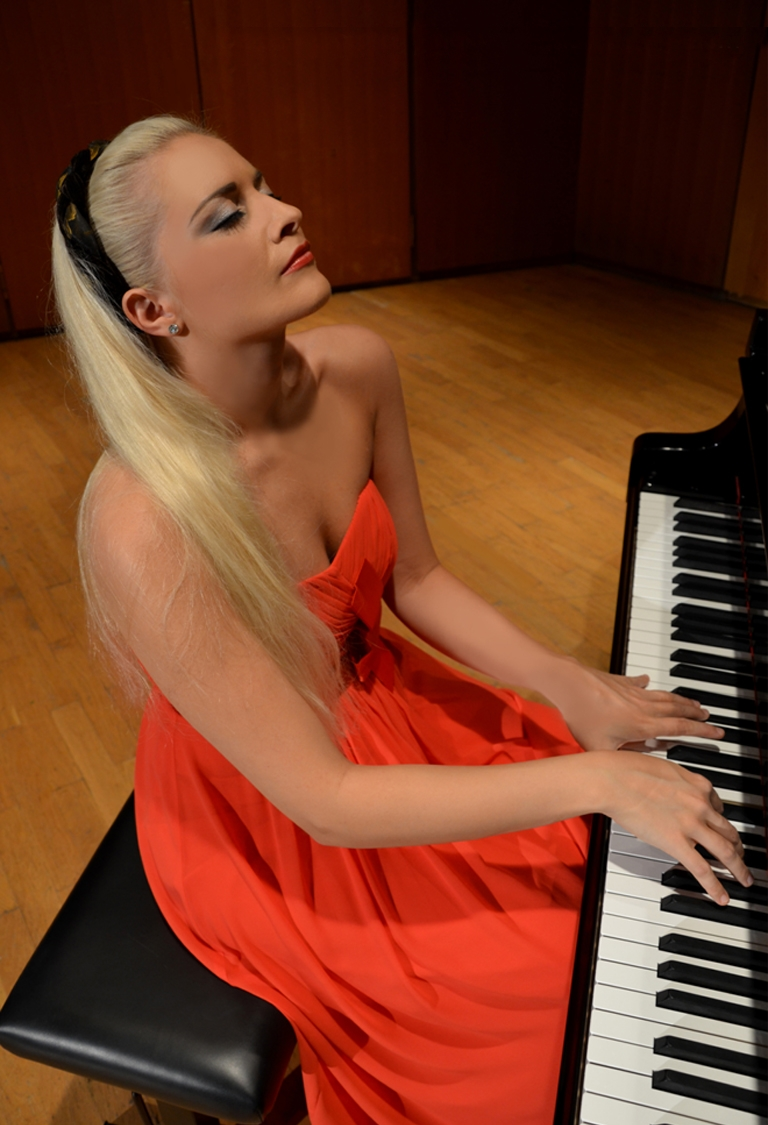
- The pianist playing
- Born: 8 July 1989 (age 37); Munich, West Germany
- Education: Mozarteum; Hochschule für Musik, Theater und Medien Hannover
- Occupation: Pianist

Valentina Babor (born 8 July 1989) is a German classical pianist. She began performing before audiences and winning youth competitions as a child. At 12, she was accepted by Karl-Heinz Kämmerling at the Mozarteum, where she became part of the university's "Initiative Hochbegabten-Förderung", a program for highly gifted students. In 2009, barely an adult, she played Rachmaninoff's Piano Concerto in C minor in concert. She continues to perform internationally.

== Career ==
Valentina Babor was born in Munich into an artistic family. At the age five, she began taking lessons in piano, violin, voice and recorder. She won the competition Jugend musiziert the first time when she was six. The Russian concert pianist Ludmila Gourari was her piano teacher from age seven to twelve, during which time she performed in Europe and won international youth competitions. She attended the Gymnasium Max-Josef-Stift, a school which concentrates on the arts. In 2002, she was accepted at the university Mozarteum in Salzburg as a "Jungstudentin" by Karl-Heinz Kämmerling, who also teaches at the Hochschule für Musik, Theater und Medien Hannover. She was part of the university's "Initiative Hochbegabten-Förderung", a promotion of highly gifted students, and collaborated especially with Kämmerling's assistant, Vassilia Efstathiadou. Since 2007, she has studied with Eliso Virsaladze and Gerhard Oppitz at the Hochschule für Musik und Theater München. She played Franz Liszt's Variationen über »Weinen, Klagen, Sorgen, Zagen« nach Johann Sebastian Bach (variations on Bach's cantata BWV 12) at a university concert in 2011.

Babor received the "Rising Star" award of the Kulturstiftung (cultural foundation) "Europa musicale" and performed in its concerts in June 2005 in the Allerheiligen-Hofkirche at the Munich Residenz. In 2008, she played with cellist Maximilian Hornung at the Prinzregententheater, also for the foundation.

Appearing at the Gasteig in 2005, she performed Chopin's Piano Concerto in E minor with the Münchener Kammerorchester, conducted by Christoph Poppen. In 2008, Babor appeared in a recital at the Ushuaia festival playing works by Beethoven, Prokofieff, Schubert and Ginastera, and Mozart's Piano Concerto in C major, K. 482. In 2009, as part of the project Musik Werkstatt Jugend (youth music workshop), she played Rachmaninoff's Piano Concerto in C minor with the ensemble interculturel in concerts in Munich's Herkulessaal and in Rouen. In 2011, she was the pianist in a concert at the Gasteig concluding a festival to honour the 200th birthday of Franz Liszt on 22 October. The program Hommage à Liszt juxtaposed chamber music by Liszt with that by Graham Waterhouse. The music was scored for piano solo up to piano and string quartet, including the premiere of Rhapsodie Macabre.
