= Andrey Shibko =

Russian pianist (born 1975)

Andrey Vladimirovich Shibko (Андрей Владимирович Шибко, born 8 March 1975 in Minsk) is a Russian pianist. His education began at the Music School for Children in Minsk. He eventually studied under professor E. Poukst at the Minsk College of Music. In 1992, he studied under the teacher Valery Kastelsky at the Moscow State Conservatory, where he continued his musical education until 1999.

In 1996, Shibko gave a recital as part of "The Great Performers Series", which included performances from André Watts, János Starker, Kathleen Battle, and the Juilliard String Quartet. He performed Tchaikovsky's Piano Concerto No. 1 with the D'Angelo Symphony Orchestra conducted by Frank Collura at the Mary D'Angelo Performing Arts Center, Mercyhurst University in Erie, Pennsylvania. Shibko gave the Russian premiere of Stravinsky's Piano Sonata in F-sharp minor in 1993.

Shibko was awarded First Prize at the 19th D'Angelo International Artist Competition in Erie, Pennsylvania, in April 1995. He is also a laureate of three European international piano competitions: Porto (1998, 1st prize), Concours Géza Anda (Zurich, 2000, 3rd prize), and World Piano Competition in London (2002, 3rd prize).

Since 1999, he has been teaching in the Department of Solo Piano Performance of the Tchaikovsky Moscow State Conservatory and has served as associate professor since 2012. Shibko has served on the jury at international competitions in Russia, Japan and China; in 2018, Shibko performed with the Ningbo Symphony Orchestra at the Silk Road Festival.
