= Nikolai Tokarev (pianist) =

- Born: Nikolai Aleksandrovich Tokarev; 21 May 1983 (age 43); Moscow, Russia
- Genre: Classical
- Occupation: Classical pianist
- Instrument: Piano
- Label: Sony Classical

Nikolai Aleksandrovich Tokarev (Russian: Николай Александрович Токарев), born 15 September 1983 in Moscow, is a Russian pianist.

== Biography ==
The musical education of Nikolai Tokarev began in 1988 at the Gnessin Music School in Moscow where he was graduated in 2001. From 2001 to 2006 he continued his studies at the Royal Northern College of Music in Manchester and afterwards at the Robert-Schumann-Hochschule in Düsseldorf. In 2003 he was awarded the first prize of the piano competition Kissinger Klavierolymp (together with Martin Helmchen). In 2006 he won the second prize and the prize of the audience of the Concours Géza Anda in Zürich. Tokarev has performed with orchestras, most notably the National Philharmonic of Russia and the BBC Philharmonic Orchestra. He had concerts at international festivals including Ludwigsburger Schlossfestspiele, the Schleswig-Holstein Music Festival, the Rheingau Musik Festival and the Kissinger Sommer.

== Discography (selection) ==
In 2007 Tokarev published his debut album at Sony Classical with works of Franz Schubert, Frédéric Chopin and Alexander Rosenblatt. An album with works of Maurice Ravel, Claude Debussy, Jean-Philippe Rameau und César Franck followed in 2008. A CD with the Piano Concerto No. 3 of Sergei Rachmaninoff and the Piano Concerto No. 1 of Pyotr Ilyich Tchaikovsky, accompanied by the National Philharmonic Orchestra of Russia under conductor Vladimir Spivakov was published in 2010.
