= Henriette Gaertner =

German pianist

Henriette Gaertner (born 1975 in Freudenstadt) is a German pianist.

The Schneider Book of Records once referred to Henriette Gärtner as "the youngest concert pianist in the world", after she attracted international attention at the International Musical Festival Lucerne as an eight-year-old. Meanwhile, Henriette Gärtner enjoys excellent repute on the international stage.

Henriette's musical talent became apparent at an unusual early age; she began playing the piano already as a three-year-old, and just two years later she gave her first major concert in Stuttgart. In the following years, Henriette Gärtner won a series of piano competitions, lastly the International Master Players Competition in Swiss Lugano, whereupon an associated concert tour of the US followed. She supplemented her artistic training with master courses taught by renowned maestros like Rudolf Buchbinder, Viktor Merzhanov, Christian Zacharias, Peter Feuchtwanger and Karl-Heinz Kämmerling.

Since that time a vigorous concert activity has followed, which led Henriette Gärtner to the musical centers of Europe. Added to that were further invitations from renowned orchestras under conductors such as Karl Münchinger, Rudolf Baumgartner, Petr Altrichter, Thomas Kalb, Richard Schumacher, Thomas Koncz, Howard Griffiths, Elyakum Shapirra, Gerd Albrecht and Edmond de Stoutz.

From 2001 until 2005 Henriette Gärtner studied at the "Incontri col Maestro" in Imola with Leonid Margarius, pupil of Vladimir Horowitz' sister Regina. Furthermore, she was admitted to "Scuola Pianistica di perfezionamento L. Margarius" in 2003.

Repeatedly Henriette Gärtner was invited to St. Martin in the Fields, London, and to St. James's Piccadilly, London, by the European Beethoven Society. Besides, she played for the Associazione Mozart Italia and the Robert-und-Clara-Schumann-Gesellschaft Leipzig.

In 2009 Henriette Gärtner released her fourth CD "Imperial" with music by Beethoven and Schubert.

== Discography ==
- Baba Yaga (2011 CD)
- Imperial (2009 CD)
- Kontraste (2002 CD)
- Faszination Musik (1998 CD)
- Die Pianistin mit Werken von… (1996 CD)
