= Jasminka Stančul =

Serbian-Austrian pianist

Jasminka Stančul-Cernko (née Stančul; Serbian: Јасминка Станчул; born 19 April 1965) is a Serbian-Austrian concert pianist and full professor at the University of Music and Performing Arts Vienna. Born in Serbia, she has been living in Vienna, Austria, since 1989. As a pianist, she is internationally renewed as an interpreter of Beethoven's music. Since a young age, she has won many music competitions and concourses. In 1989, she was the winner of the 8th International Beethoven Piano Competition Vienna.

== Biography ==
Jasminka Stančul was born in Kikinda, Serbia (then part of SFR Yugoslavia) on 19 April 1965. After finishing elementary music school in her hometown, she studied at the secondary music school in Subotica and graduated from the Novi Sad Academy of Arts in 1985. Between 1985 and 1987, she worked as a docent at the same Academy. After that, she continued studies at the Conservatory of Vienna under Noel Flores and the Conservatoire de Musique de Genève under Maria Tipo. In 1989, Stančul won the first prize at the 8th International Beethoven Piano Competition Vienna, playing Beethoven's Piano Concerto No. 1. International jury awarded Stančul the first prize, while the second and third prize were not awarded at all.

In 2013, Stančul became a professor at the Ljubljana Academy of Music. Since October 2019, she has been a full professor of piano concertos at the University of Music and Performing Arts Vienna. Since October 2024, she has been the head of the University's Institute for piano.

Stančul is married to Austrian bank manager Willibald Cernko and holds Austrian citizenship.
