= Peter Ovtcharov =

Russian classical pianist (born 1981)

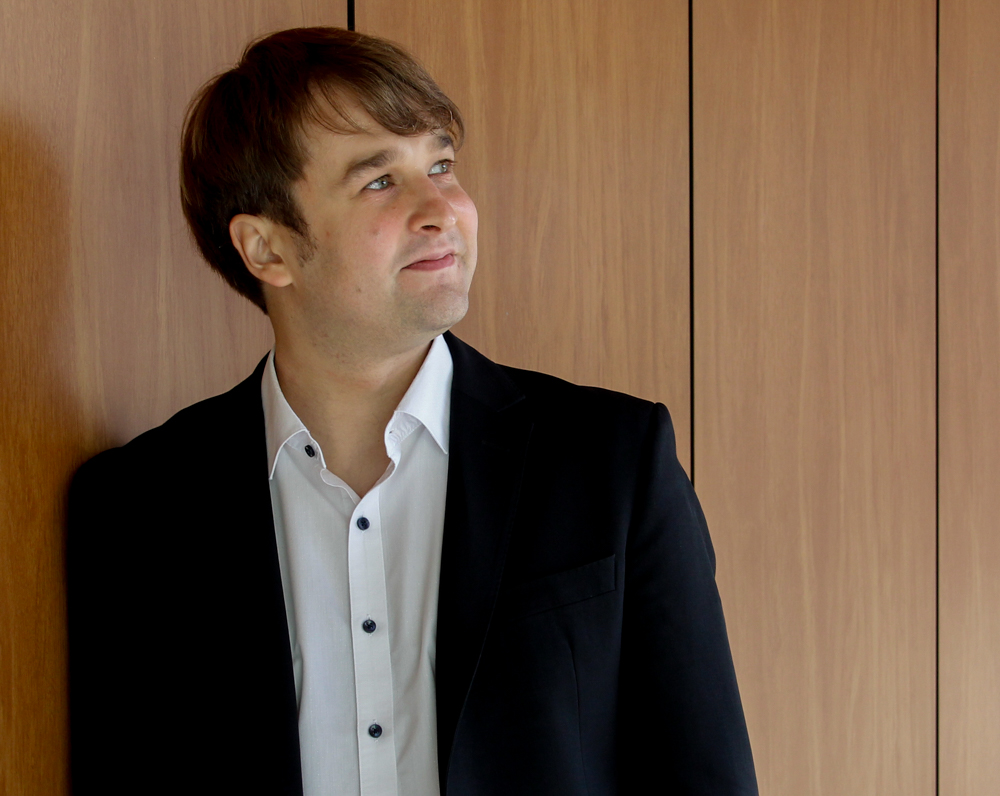

Background information
- Born: 31 December 1981 (age 44); Leningrad, Russian SFSR, Soviet Union
- Occupations: Musician, Professor, Composer
- Instrument: Classical piano
- Years active: 1990–present

Peter Ovtcharov (Russian: Пётр Сергеевич Овчаров; born 31 December 1981 in Leningrad) is a Russian classical pianist and composer currently residing in Seoul, South Korea. He studied at the Universität Mozarteum Salzburg with German teacher Karl-Heinz Kämmerling and won several prizes and awards, including the Second Prize at the International Vladimir Krainev Competition in Kharkiv, Ukraine (1992), Silver Medaille at the 3rd International Tchaikovsky Competition for Young Musicians (ex aequo with Korean pianist Son Yeol-Eum, 1997), the First Prize at the National Austrian competition "Gradus ad Parnassum" (2004), Silvio Bengalli Piano Prize (Italy, 2004) and the Third Prize at the International Beethoven Competition in Vienna (2005). In 2006, he received the Luitpold Prize of the Year from the prestigious German festival "Kissinger Sommer".

== Teaching ==
Recently, Peter Ovtcharov is a Professor of Yonsei University.

He is giving numerous concerts, masterclasses and lectures in Europe and Asia.

== Composition ==
His compositions include works for piano solo (released 2021 as an album), chamber music, as well the symphonic poem "The Battle".

== Discography ==
- Rachmaninoff Etudes-Tableaux (Complete) (2003, ram Germany)
- Chopin Mazurkas (Complete) (2006, ram Germany, 2 CD)
- Rabl, Zemlinsky: Trios and Quartets with Eggner, Zimper, Suklar (2020, Gramola 99228)
- Peter Ovtcharov. Piano Works (Davidsbündler 21 Records, 2021)

== Family ==
His father is a notable Russian movie director and scriptwriter Sergei Ovtcharov, winner of numerous international prizes, including Golden Bear at the Berlin Film Festival and nominations for the Palme d'Or in Cannes Film Festival.
