= Yu Kosuge =

Yū Kosuge 小菅優
- Born: May 24, 1983 (age 43); Tokyo
- Genres: classical
- Instrument: piano

Yu Kosuge (小菅 優, Kosuge Yū) (born 1983) is a Japanese classical pianist.

Kosuge was born in Tokyo, Japan in 1983. At the age of four, she entered Tokyo College of Music, having been selected under a programme aimed at providing specialist education to gifted children. At the age of nine, she made her orchestral debut, playing with the Tokyo New City Orchestra.

In 1993, she moved to Germany to study with Karl-Heinz Kämmerling, and later with András Schiff. In 2003, she was awarded the S&R Washington Award Grand Prize from the S&R Foundation, which is awarded annually to the most talented young artist (in the fields of fine arts, music, drama, dance, photography and film), for contributions to US-Japanese relations.

She has made a number of well-received recordings. The German magazine Fono Forum gave a five-star rating to her recording of the Chopin Etudes, made when she was sixteen years old. She has also recorded Liszt’s Études d'exécution transcendante (2003), Chopin’s Préludes (2005), two Mozart piano concertos (2006) and works by Schumann and Liszt (2007). A recording of her Carnegie Hall debut, in November 2005, was released by Sony. Reviewing the recital, the critic of CultureCatch praised the "beauty and great variety of Kosuge's tone production".
