= Alexey Zuev =

Russian pianist (born 1982)

- Born: 28 April 1982 (age 44); Saint Petersburg
- Genres: Classical music
- Occupation: Pianist
- Instrument: Piano

Alexey Zuev (Russian: Алексей Зуев; born 28 April 1982 in Leningrad (now St. Petersburg)), is a Russian pianist.

His education as a pianist began at the age of seven at a special conservatory for gifted children in St. Petersburg. In 1999 he won the second prize of the International Prokofiev Competition for piano in St. Petersburg. A first prize wasn't awarded then. Beginning in 2000 Zuev studied at the Mozarteum in Salzburg with Alexei Lubimov and since 2007 with Eliso Virsaladze in Munich. In 2004 he won the Kissinger Klavierolymp and in 2009 the second prize of the Concours Géza Anda in Zürich.

In 2012, Zuev appeared together with Alexei Lubimov on a CD released by ECM Records entitled Claude Debussy Préludes, which contained the Prélude à l'après-midi d'un faune in the 1895 transcription for two pianos.

In 2017, he published a CD featuring piano works of Edvard Grieg played on historical pianos by Erard and Pleyel; the album includes the Piano Concerto performed with the Orchestra of the 18th Century under Kenneth Montgomery.

Zuev has performed at festivals like Oleg Kagan Music Festival, Kissinger Sommer, Festspiele Mecklenburg-Vorpommern and Klavier-Festival Ruhr. He has recitals and concerto performances in Luxemburg, Austria, Germany, Italy, Switzerland and Russia. He performed with Sir George Solti’s World Orchestra for Peace under the baton of Valery Gergiev. Zuev also performed with the London Philharmonic Orchestra and the Philadelphia Orchestra under Vladimir Jurowski.
