= Karl-Heinz Kämmerling =

German academic teacher of classical pianists (1930-2012)

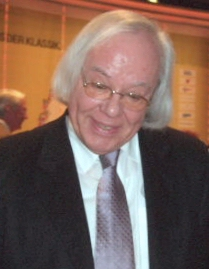
- Kämmerling in 2007
- Born: 6 May 1930; Dessau, Germany
- Died: 14 June 2012 (aged 82); Hanover, Germany
- Education: Hochschule für Musik Leipzig
- Occupations: Pianist; Academic teacher; Juror of piano competitions
- Organizations: Mozarteum; Hochschule für Musik, Theater und Medien Hannover; European Piano Teachers Association
- Awards: Order of Merit of the Federal Republic of Germany

Karl-Heinz Kämmerling (6 May 1930 – 14 June 2012) was a German academic teacher of classical pianists, who trained pianists at the Mozarteum in Salzburg and the Hochschule für Musik, Theater und Medien Hannover for careers as performers and academic teachers, particularly in the early training of highly gifted students.

== Career ==
Kämmerling was born in Dessau and studied at the Hochschule für Musik Leipzig with Anton Rohden and Hugo Steurer. Besides teaching as a professor at the Mozarteum and in Hannover, he became a guest professor at the university of music in Zagreb in 2004 and taught master classes in Europe, the United States and Asia. Among his students are Amir Tebenikhin, Wenyu Shen, Markus Becker, Valentina Babor, Thomas Duis, Severin von Eckardstein, Henriette Gaertner, Bernd Goetzke, Konstanze Eickhorst, Michail Lifits, Philippe Giusiano, Peter Ovtcharov, Sophie Pacini, Oliver Kern, Igor Levit, Herbert Schuch, Márton Illés, Yu Kosuge, Kristin Merscher, Matthew Odell, Alice Sara Ott, Aaron Pilsan, Ragna Schirmer, Danae Dörken, Aaron Pilsan and Lars Vogt. When he celebrated his 80th birthday, 80 of his students had won national competitions, 50 had won international competitions, and 21 were academic teachers. He was particularly active in the early training of highly gifted students at the "Institut zur Früh-Förderung Hochbegabter" at the Hochschule in Hannover. He served as a vice president of the university for six years.

Kämmerling was one of the editors of the journal "Üben und Musizieren" (Practice and Music-Making) and the founder and long-term president of the German Association of the European Piano Teachers Association. He was a member of the German Academic Exchange Service, the Deutsche Studienstiftung, and a member of the "Instituts für Begabungsforschung in der Musik" (Institute for the research of musical talent) at the University of Paderborn. In 1979 he was a co-founder of the "Internationale Musikakademie für Solisten" (International Music Academy for Soloists, IMAS) and was its artistic director until 2010.

He served on the jury of international piano competitions such as The Leeds, the Arthur Rubinstein Competitions in Tel Aviv and in Dresden, and the International Chopin Piano Competition.

== Awards ==
Kämmerling received the prize Niedersachsenpreis in 1985. In 1999 he was awarded thean Officer's Cross of the Order of Merit of the Federal Republic of Germany. In 2000 he was awarded the Grand Decoration of Honour for Services to the Republic of Austria. He was an honorary member of Deutscher Musikrat (German Music Council, a member of the International Music Council), since 2005.
