= Sergey Tanin =

Russian pianist

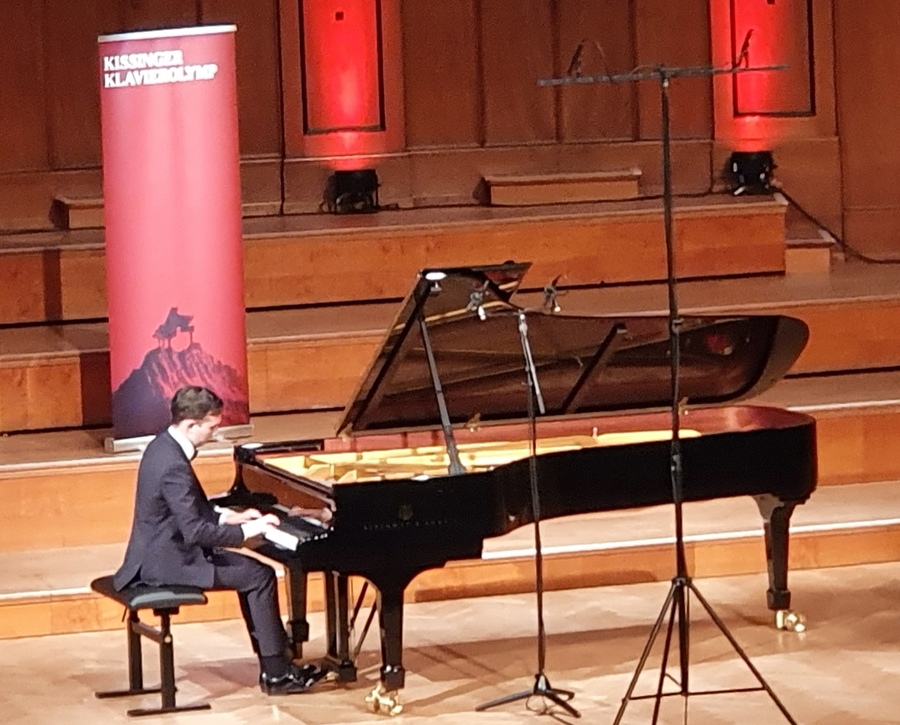
Sergey Tanin at Kissinger Klavierolymp 2020

Sergey Tanin (born 27 June 1995) is a Russian pianist. He has performed with leading symphony orchestras, including the Tonhalle-Orchester Zürich under Christian Zacharias, the Bamberger Symphoniker under Jakub Hruša; and won several awards such as the Concours Reine Elisabeth (2025), and the Concours Géza Anda in Zurich (2018).

== Biography ==
After starting his musical education in Yakutia and continuing it at the central music school of Moscow he became a student of Irina Plotnikova at the Tchaikovsky Conservatory in Moscow. In 2019, he moved to Switzerland where he continued his studies with Claudio Martinez Mehner at the Musikakademie Basel. Currently, he continues his education with Anna Vinnitskaya during a soloist program at the Hochschule für Musik und Theater Hamburg and lives in Switzerland.

He is a prize winner at prestigious competitions such as the Concours Reine Elisabeth 2025 playing Prokofiev's 3rd piano concerto, the Concours Géza Anda in Zurich 2018 (including the audience award), the Bremen piano competition in 2016 or the Kissinger Klavierolymp 2020 (including the audience award). He shared the stage with conductors like Christian Zacharias or Jakub Hrůša or chamber music partners like Michael Barenboim or Esther Hoppe. He played in renowned concert halls such as the Tonhalle Zürich, the Stadtcasino Basel, the Salle Gaveau in Paris, the Bozar in Brussels or the great hall of the Tchaikovsky Conservatory and many international festivals such as the Musikdorf Ernen, musicaAndeer or the Festival of Cervo.

== Discography ==
- Brahms / Schubert-Liszt / Prokofiev (Prospero, 2021): With the first piano sonata of Johannes Brahms, transcriptions of Schubert songs by Franz Liszt as well as Sergei Prokofiev's piano pieces op. 12.
- Rachmaninoff: 6 Moments Musicaux (Prospero, 2023): Sergei Rachmaninoff's op. 16 played on Rachmaninoff's original Steinway grand piano.
- Sergey Tanin plays Schumann (Prospero, 2024): With Davidsbündlertänze op. 6, Toccata op. 7, Arabeske op. 18 and Faschingsschwank aus Wien op. 26, all by Robert Schumann.
