= Willibald Cernko =

Austrian bank manager (born 1956)

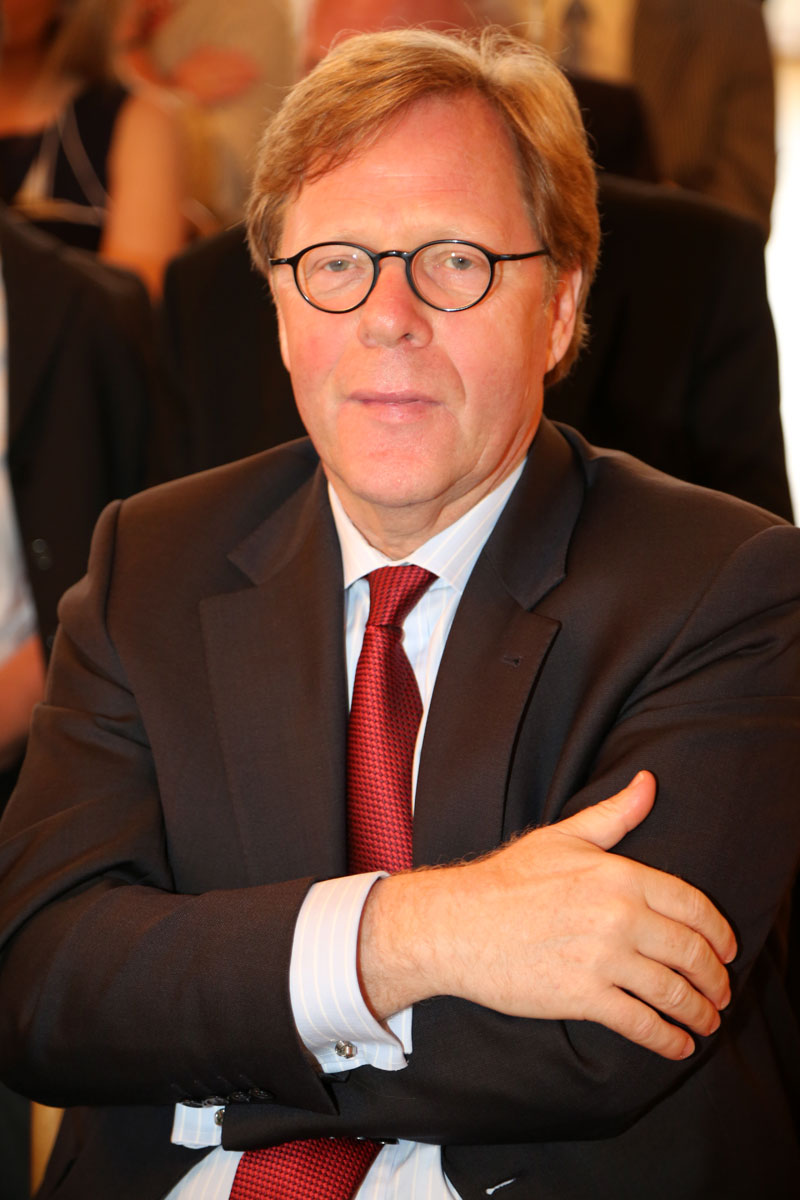
Willibald Cernko, 2013

Willibald Cernko (born 7 July 1956 in Knittelfeld, Austria) is an Austrian bank manager and has served as a member of the management board of the Erste Group Bank AG, responsible for risk management (CRO), since 1 January 2017.

== Early years and career ==
Willibald Cernko grew up with four siblings in Rothenthurm (now part of Sankt Peter ob Judenburg) in Styria, Austria. He attended a business academy and afterwards studied at the Vienna University of Economics and Business, which he left before completing his degree.

Willibald Cernko started his career at the Raiffeisenkasse Obdach-Weißkirchen in 1983. In 1985, he moved to Vienna and began working at Creditanstalt-Bankverein, one of the predecessor banks of Bank Austria. Cernko was deputy head of corporate customers between 1996 and 1998, before joining the Bank Austria management board in 2000 with responsibility for the bank's corporate business segment. Two years later, he assumed the position as the management board member responsible for the CEE region at the newly merged Bank Austria Creditanstalt AG. In 2006, he also became a member of HypoVereinsbank AG’s management board, responsible for the Private and Corporate Customers division. Between January and September 2009, Cernko also held the position of executive vice president at UniCredit Group and served as head of retail for Germany and Austria.

On 1 October 2009, Cernko followed Erich Hampel as chairman of the board of directors of UniCredit Bank Austria AG. Robert Zadrazil replaced Cernko in this position on 1 March 2016.

Since 1 January 2017, Willibald Cernko has been a member of the management board at Erste Group, where he serves as chief risk officer (CRO). Since 1 June 2017, his division has also assumed responsibility for the work of Erste Group’s Group Sustainability Office, with the goal of establishing sustainability, including the issues of diversity and inclusion, as an essential component of Erste Group’s corporate culture.

== Personal life ==
Cernko is married to Jasminka Stancul, a concert pianist, and has four children. His son Leonard Cernko was named "Chef of the Year" by Gault-Milau-Österreich in 2006.
