= Arie Vardi =

Israeli pianist (born 1937)

- אריה ורדי
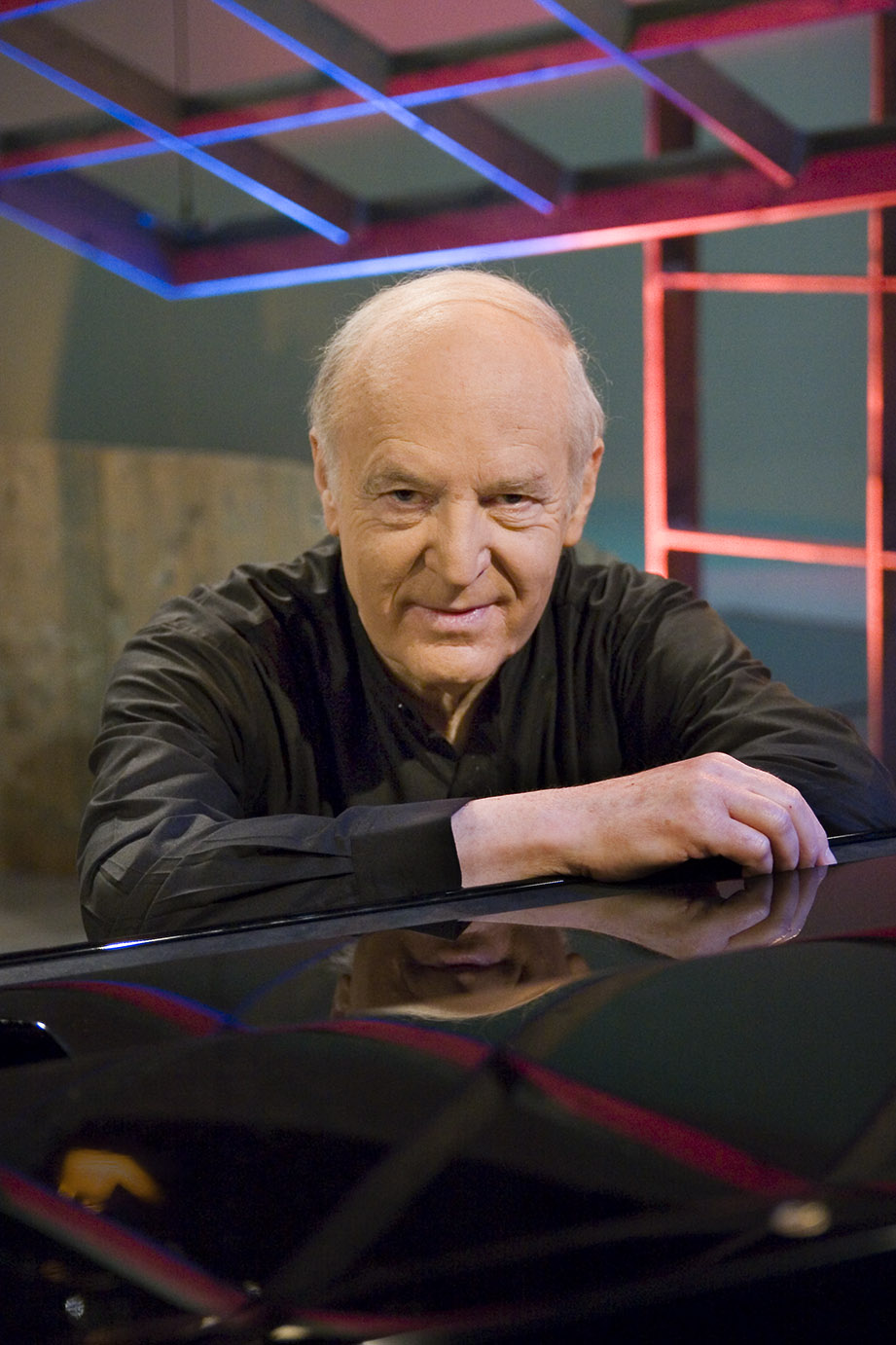
- Born: 1937 (age 88–89); Tel Aviv, Israel
- Occupations: Pianist, conductor

Arie Vardi (Hebrew: אריה ורדי; born 1937) is an Israeli classical pianist, conductor, and piano pedagogue. He is laureate of the Israel Prize in 2017.

== Biography ==
Vardi was born in Tel Aviv and graduated from the Rubin Academy (renamed the Buchmann-Mehta School of Music in 2005) and earned a law degree at Tel Aviv University. He obtained a soloist diploma from at City of Basel Music Academy. Among his music teachers were Paul Baumgartner (piano), Pierre Boulez and Karlheinz Stockhausen (composition). He then went on to become professor of piano and head of department at the Rubin Academy, and later became the head of the school.

== Music career ==
Vardi launched his concert career at the age of fifteen as the winner of the Chopin Competition in Israel and the George Enescu International Competition in Bucharest.

Vardi performs regularly as soloist-conductor, playing the complete set of concerti by Bach and Mozart, part of which he has played on the Hammerflügel. His extensive repertoire includes various Israeli works, many of which were dedicated to him. In the 2001 season, Vardi directed, conducted and played a series of five concerts with the Israel Chamber Orchestra. The series, entitled "The Piano Concerto", featured twelve concertos ranging from Bach to the 21st century. In the 2004–5 season he launched a new weekend series with the Israel Philharmonic, "Morning Intermezzo", where he serves as conductor and presenter. For television viewers he is best known for his series Master Classes, the family series of the Israel Philharmonic Orchestra which he conducts and presents, and also currently for his new series Intermezzo with Arik.

== Students ==
Vardi’s students include concert artists Nareh Arghamanyan, Astrith Baltsan, Yefim Bronfman, Kevin Chen, Sa Chen, Alexander Gavrylyuk, Boris Giltburg, Chi-Ho Han, Martin Helmchen, Claire Huangci, Dasol Kim, Yundi Li, Dong Hyun Lim, Mateusz Molęda, Joseph Mook, Illia Ovcharenko, Francesco Piemontesi, Roman Rabinovitch, Beatrice Rana, Aviram Reichert, Tomoki Sakata, Lahav Shani, Dmitry Shishkin, Yeol Eum Son, Yaara Tal, Alessandro Taverna, and Xiaohan Wang. His students have won over 65 first prizes at international competitions.

Mathematician Noam Elkies was a student of his between 1972 and 1978.

== Jury member ==
He has been a Jury member in many major international competitions, namely the Beethoven (Bonn), Beethoven (Vienna), Busoni (Bolzano), China, Chopin (Warsaw), Cleveland (Ohio), Cliburn (Texas), Gina Bachauer (Salt Lake City), Hamamatsu (Japan), Leeds (England), Dino Ciani (Milan), ARD (Munich), Paloma O'Shea in Santander (Spain), Scottish (Glasgow), Shenzhen (China), Shanghai, Sydney, Tchaikovsky (Moscow), Tokyo, Minneapolis and others. Vardi is currently the artistic advisor and chairman of the jury of the Arthur Rubinstein International Master Competition.

== Master classes ==
Vardi has held master classes and presented lecture recitals at many of the world's top conservatories. His recordings of Mozart concertos have included the Concerto for Three Pianos with Yefim Bronfman and Radu Lupu. Vardi teaches at the Hochschule für Musik Hannover, Germany, and at the Buchmann-Mehta School of Music in Tel Aviv.

== Awards and recognition ==
His recordings have won critical acclaim. In 2004, the Minister of Education Award was bestowed upon him for his lifetime achievement. In 2017, Vardi was awarded the Israel Prize.
