= Alice Sara Ott =

German-Japanese pianist (born 1988)

- アリス＝紗良・オット
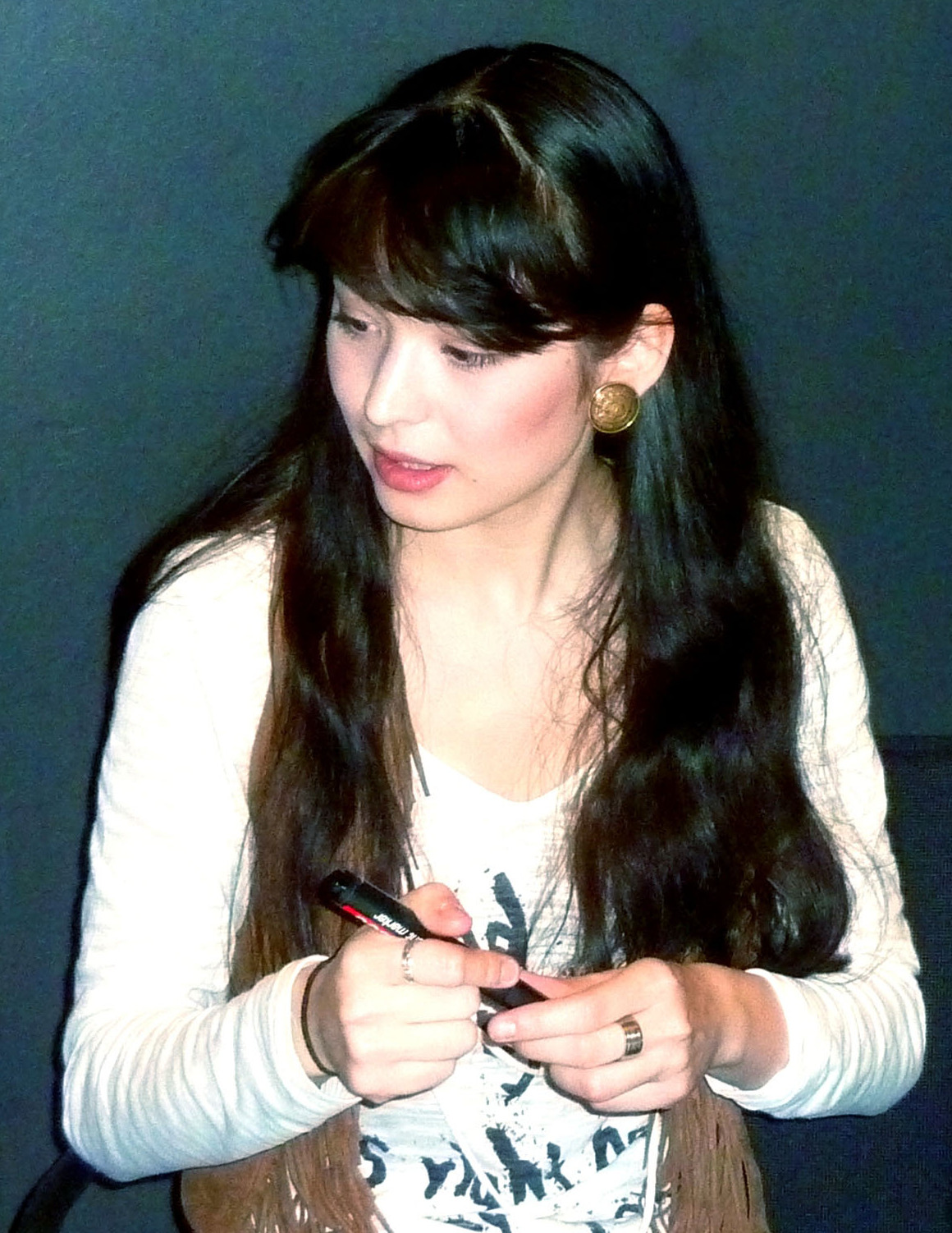
- Ott in 2011
- Born: 1 August 1988 (age 37); Munich, West Germany
- Occupation: Musician
- Musical career
- Genres: Classical
- Instrument: Piano
- Label: Deutsche Grammophon
- Website: alicesaraott.com

Signature
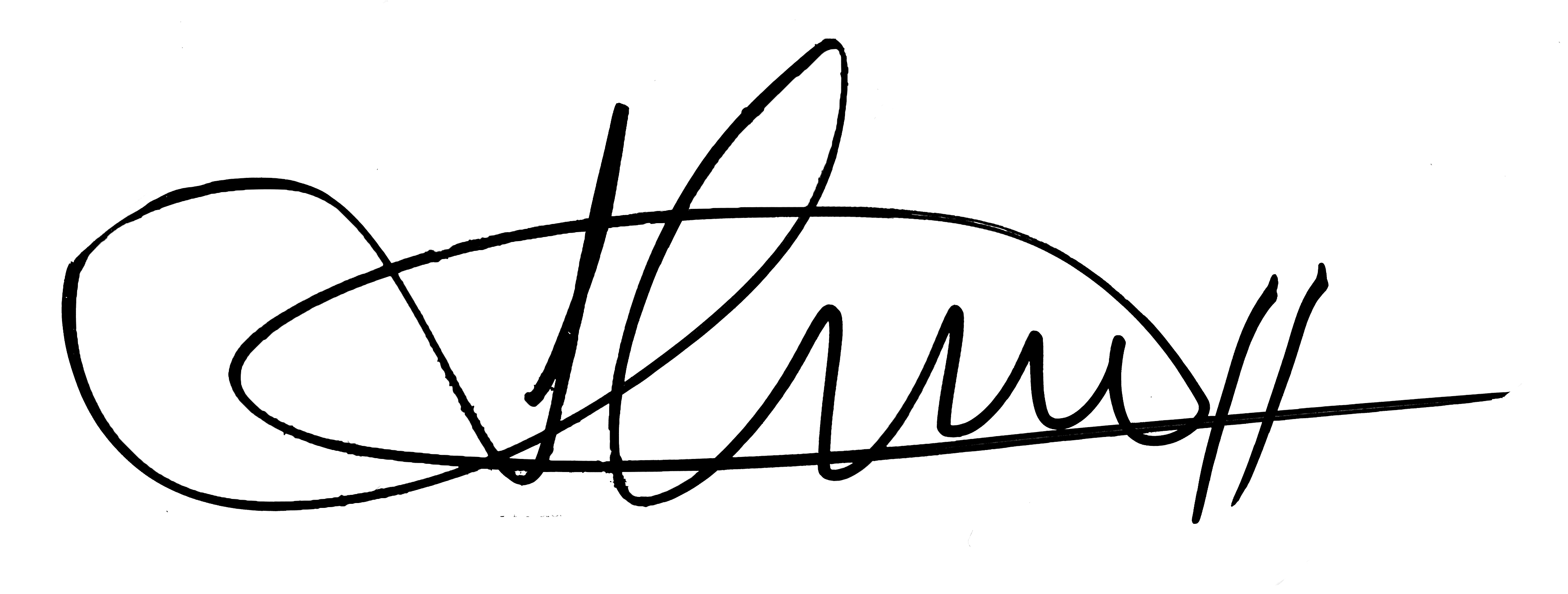

Alice Sara Ott (Japanese: アリス＝紗良・オット, Hepburn: Arisu Sara Otto; born August 1, 1988) is a German pianist.

== Early life and education ==
Ott was born in Munich, West Germany, in 1988. Her Japanese mother had studied piano in Tokyo; her father was a German civil engineer. She says she realised as a child that "music was the language that goes much beyond any words" and that she wanted to communicate and express herself through music. Ott started piano lessons at the age of four. At age five, she reached the final stage of the youth competition in Munich, playing to a full house in the Hercules Hall. At age seven, she won the Jugend musiziert competition in Germany. In 2002, Ott was the youngest finalist at the Hamamatsu International Piano Competition in Japan, where she won the Most Promising Artist award. From the age of twelve, she studied at the Salzburg Mozarteum with Karl-Heinz Kämmerling while continuing her school education in Munich. Ott has won awards at a number of piano competitions, including first prize at the 2004 Pianello Val Tidone Competition.

Her younger sister Mona Asuka Ott is also a classical pianist.

In February 2019, Ott announced on Instagram that she had been diagnosed with multiple sclerosis.

== Career ==
Ott has made recordings for Deutsche Grammophon and performs regularly in concert tours in Europe, Japan, and the United States. She won first prize in the 2003 Bach Competition in Köthen, the 2004 Pianello Val Tidone Competition in Italy, and the 4th EPTA (European Piano Teachers Association) International Competition in 2005.

== Recordings ==
Ott has a recording contract with Deutsche Grammophon and her recordings include:

- 2009 – Liszt: Études d'exécution transcendante
- 2010 – Chopin: Complete Waltzes
- 2010 – Liszt: Piano Concerto No. 1 and Tchaikovsky: Piano Concerto No. 1
- 2011 – Beethoven: Piano sonatas No.3 in C, Op.2 No.3 and No.21 in C, Op.53 (Waldstein)
- 2013 – Mussorgsky: Pictures at an Exhibition and Schubert: Piano Sonata in D major, D850
- 2014 – Scandale (with Francesco Tristano)
  - Tristano: A Soft Shell Groove
  - Stravinsky: The Rite of Spring
  - Rimsky-Korsakoff: Scheherazade – The Story of the Kalendar Prince
  - Ravel: La Valse
- 2015 – The Chopin Project (with Ólafur Arnalds)
- 2016 – Wonderland. Edvard Grieg:
  - Piano Concerto In A Minor, Op.16
  - Lyric Pieces Book I, Op.12, Album Leaf; Elves' Dance; Book III, Op.43, Butterfly; To Spring; Book V, Op.54, March Of The Trolls; Notturno; Book VII, Op.62, Brooklet; Book VIII, Op.65, Ballad; Wedding Day At Troldhaugen; Book X, Op.71, Once Upon A Time
  - Peer Gynt Suite No.1, Op.46, In The Hall Of The Mountain King; Peer Gynt Suite No.2, Op.55, Solveig's Song
- 2018 – Nightfall
  - Claude Debussy
    - Rêverie, L. 68;
    - Suite bergamasque, L. 75
  - Erik Satie
    - Gnossiennes: No. 1 (Lent), No. 3 (Lent);
    - Gymnopédies: No. 1 (Lent et douloureux)
  - Maurice Ravel
    - Gaspard de la Nuit, M. 55
    - Pavane pour une infante défunte, M. 19
- 2021 - Echoes of Life
  - Frédéric Chopin: Preludes, Op. 28
  - Francesco Tristano: In The Beginning Was
  - György Ligeti: Musica ricercata – I. Sostenuto. Misurato. Prestissimo.
  - Nino Rota: Valzer
  - Chilly Gonzales: Prelude in C Sharp Major
  - Toru Takemitsu: Litany (In Memory of Michael Vyner)
  - Arvo Pärt: Für Alina
  - Alice Sara Ott: Lullaby to Eternity (on fragments of the Lacrymosa from W.A. Mozart's Requiem)
- 2023 - Beethoven: Piano Concerto No. 1 in C Major, Op. 15
  - Ludwig van Beethoven: Piano Concerto No. 1 in C Major, Op. 15
- 2023 - Beethoven
  - Ludwig van Beethoven
    - Piano Concerto No. 1 in C Major, Op. 15
    - Piano Sonata No. 14 in C-sharp minor, Op. 27 No. 2 "Moonlight"
    - Für Elise, WoO 59
    - 11 Bagatelles, Op. 119: No. 1, Allegretto
    - Bagatelle in C Major, WoO 54 "Lustig und Traurig"
    - Allegretto in B minor, WoO 61
- 2025 - John Field: Complete Nocturnes
- 2026 - Jóhann Jóhannsson: Piano Works
