= Internationale Musikakademie für Solisten =

German music school

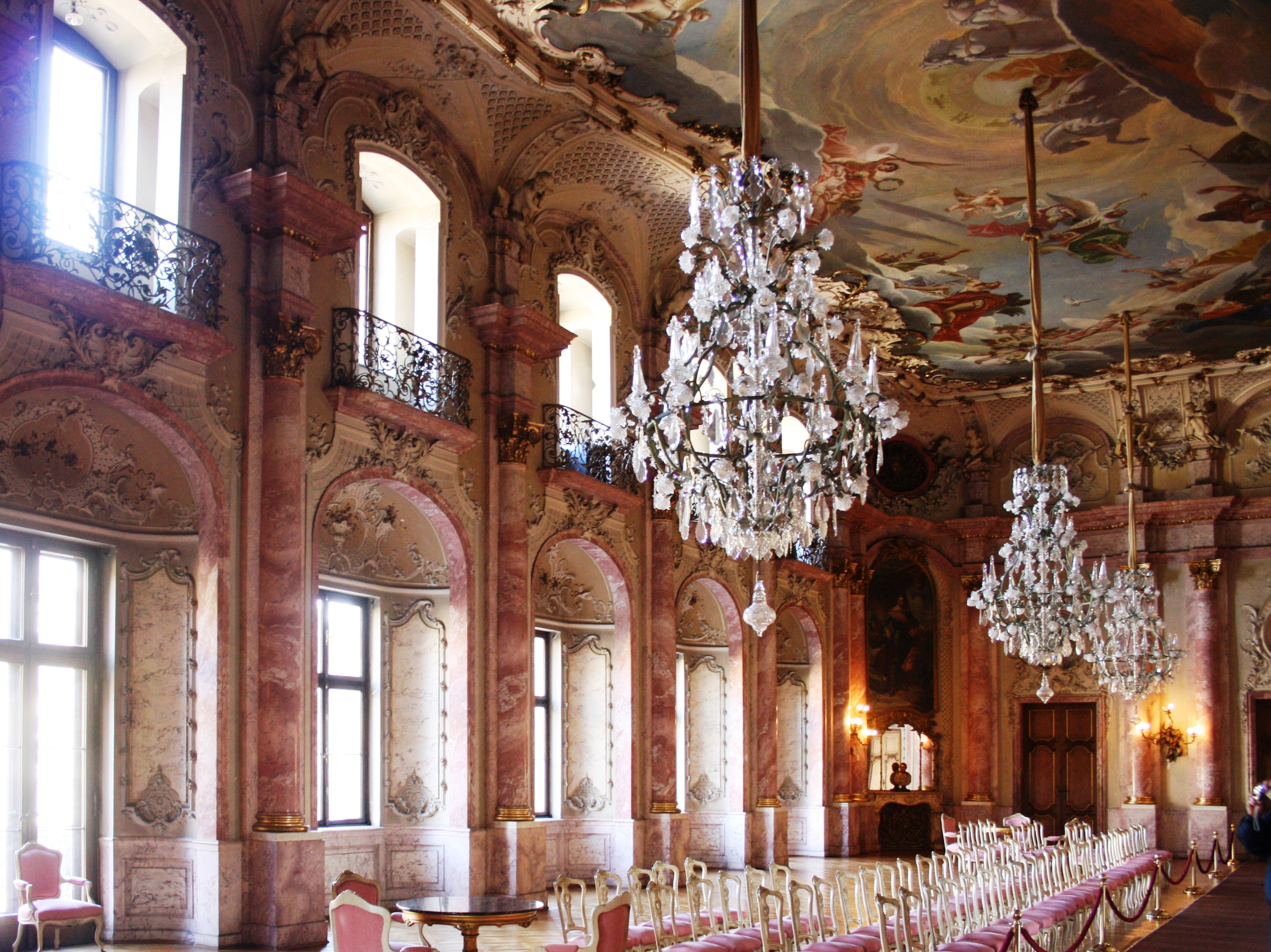
Ballroom of the Schloss Bückeburg

The Internationale Musikakademie für Solisten (International Academy for Soloists, IMAS) is a music school located in Hanover with master classes for highly talented young soloists who are aiming for an international career. It is one of the leading training centres for soloists in Germany . The offered courses change annually in the fields of piano, violin, singing, violoncello, French horn and Chamber music.

== Activity and organisation ==
Professors of the Hochschule für Musik, Theater und Medien Hannover and other experienced musicians teach the students at Schloss Bückeburg. So far, IMAS has supported more than 1000 highly talented students from 35 nations (as of January 2014).

The nine-day individual courses begin in autumn and end with a final concert in the castle's ballroom. In order to keep the costs of participation low, the students live with citizens of Bückeburg during the course. The board of directors of the Trägerverein consists of Ulrike Fontaine (chairwoman), Peter Christoph Loewe (deputy chairman), Ines Gräfin von der Schulenburg (finances), Bernd Goetzke (artistic director) and Alexander, Prince of Schaumburg-Lippe (honorary chairman). A seven-member board of trustees assists the board of directors. The pianist Boris Kuznetsov is responsible for project management.

== History ==
The non-profit association, "Internationale Musikakademie für Solisten", was founded in 1978 by Reimar Dahlgrün, professor emeritus of the University of Music in Hannover, together with colleagues. During the first ten years, teaching was held in the Herzog August Bibliothek in Wolfenbüttel. In 1986 Alexander Fürst zu Schaumburg-Lippe brought the academy into the Schloss Bückeburg. In 1982, Gotthard Kronstein took over as managing director.

Karl-Heinz Kämmerling was responsible for the overall artistic direction for about three decades. At the end of 2010 Bernd Goetzke became his successor.

== Personalities ==
=== Docents ===
Source, if not stated otherwise:

Piano

- Guido Agosti
- Bernd Glemser
- Bernd Goetzke
- Karl-Heinz Kämmerling
- Zsigmond Szathmáry

Violin

- Ana Chumachenco
- André Gertler
- Yfrah Neaman
- Igor Ozim
- Kurt Saßmannshaus
- Krzysztof Węgrzyn

Violoncello

- Julius Berger
- Wolfgang Boettcher
- André Navarra
- Wolfgang Emanuel Schmidt

French Horn

- Stefan Dohr
- Marie-Luise Neunecker

Bassoon

- Klaus Thunemann

Singing

- Judith Beckmann
- Helen Donath
- Christiane Iven
- Sena Jurinac
- Helena Łazarska
- Charlotte Lehmann
- Birgit Nilsson
- Rudolf Piernay
- Elisabeth Schwarzkopf
- Mitsuko Shirai
- Hildegard Uhrmacher
- Dunja Vejzovic
- Lars Woldt

=== Students ===
Source, if not stated otherwise:

Piano

- Sheila Arnold (* 1970), professor at the Hochschule für Musik und Tanz Köln
- Markus Becker
- Luiza Borac
- Konstanze Eickhorst
- Alexej Gorlatch
- Ayumi Janke
- Yo Kosuge
- Roland Krüger
- Igor Levit
- Alice Sara Ott
- Ragna Schirmer
- Lars Vogt

Violin

- Ulrike-Anima Mathé

Violoncello

- Marcio Carneiro
- Manuel Fischer-Dieskau

Singing

- Christiane Iven
