= Clara Haskil International Piano Competition =

International piano competition founded in memory of Clara Haskil

The Clara Haskil Piano Competition (French: Concours international de piano Clara Haskil) was founded in 1963 in order to honour and perpetuate the memory the Romanian-Swiss pianist Clara Haskil.

The competition is a member of the World Federation of International Music Competitions since 1976. It takes place every two years in Vevey where Clara Haskil resided from 1942 until her death in Brussels in 1960. A street in Vevey bears her name.

The competition welcomes young pianists from all over the world.

The competition benefits from the collaboration with Radio Television Suisse Espace 2, and from the generous sponsorship of the Fondation Nestle pour l'Art, Leenards Foundation, Loterie Romande, Stanley Thomas Johnson Foundation, Lombard Odier Darier Hentsch & Cie Bank, the towns and communities of Vevey, Montreux, La Tour-de-Peilz, Blonay, Chardonne, Corseaux, Corsier, Jongny, and several commercial companies. The members of a circle of private donors, founded in 1999, also support the activities of the Clara Haskil Competition.

The final, broadcast by Radio Suisse Romande Espace 2 and by Radio Télévision Suisse, is part of the Montreux-Vevey International Festival of Opera and Music.

== Winners 1963–2023 ==
Year	Winner	Finalists
1963	no winner	Jon Bingham – England; Gino Brandi – Italy; Jakob Maxin – USA/Russia; Mayne Miller – USA
1965	Christoph Eschenbach, Germany	Françoise Parrot – France; Carme Vilà – Spain; Annerose Walther – Germany
1967	Dinorah Varsi – Uruguay	John Owings – USA; Zsuzsanna Sirokay – Hungary; Michael Studer – Switzerland
1969	no winner	Peter Lang – Austria; Hanae Nakajima – Japan; Zsuzsanna Sirokay – Hungary
1973	Richard Goode – United States	Penelope Blackie – Great Britain; Brigitte Meyer – Switzerland; Mitsuko Uchida – Japan
1975	Michel Dalberto – France	Marie-Catherine Girod – France; Brigitte Meyer – Switzerland; Kyung Sook Lee – Korea; Margrit Pirner – Germany
1977	Evgeni Koroliov – USSR	Dennis Lee – Malaysia; Jeffrey Kahane – USA; Mamiko Suda – Japan
1979	Cynthia Raim – United States	Edouard Garcin – France; Kei Itoh – Japan; Marie-Paule Siruguet – France; Pietro Rigacci – Italy; Mamiko Suda – Japan
1981	Konstanze Eickhorst – Germany	Eric N'Kaoua – France; Friedemann Rieger – Germany; Nina Tichman – USA; Marioara Trifan – USA
1983	no winner	Nathalie Béra-Tagrine – France; Luc Devos – Belgium; Sandro de Palma – Italy; Yukino Fujiwara – Japan
1985	Nataša Veljkovic – Yugoslavia	Philippe Cassard – France; Alexandra Papastefanou – Greece; Philippe Zahnd – Switzerland; Tomoko Ogasawara – Japan; Huseyn Sermet – Turkey
1987	Hiroko Sakagami – Japan	Sachiyo Yonekawa – Japan; David Satyabrata – Indonesia; Sylviane Deferne – Switzerland; Laurent Cabasso – France; Jean-Marie Cottet – France
1989	Gustavo Romero – United States	Ishibashi Eri – Japan; Marie-Josèphe Jude – France; Marietta Petkova – Bulgaria; Patricia Pagny – France; Doris Adam – Austria
1991	Steven Osborne – Scotland	Yoshiko Iwai – Japan; Lorenz Ehrsam – Switzerland; Emmanuel Strosser – France; Alena Tchernouchenko – USSR
1993	Till Fellner – Austria	Adrian Oetiker – Switzerland; Seiko Ohtomo – Japan
1995	Mihaela Ursuleasa – Romania	Sheila Arnold – Germany/India; Klaus Sticken – Germany;
1997	Delphine Bardin – France	Polina Leschenko – Russia, Israel; Hie-Yon Choi – South Korea; Daniil Kopylov – Russia; Nicholas Ong – Malaysia; Miku Nishimoto-Neubert – Japan
1999	Finghin Collins – Ireland	Julia Bartha – Germany; Julien Le Pape – France; Denys Proshayev – Ukraine
2001	Martin Helmchen – Germany	Inon Barnatan – Israel; Deborah Lee – United States
2003	no winner	Herbert Schuch – Germany; Stefan Stroissnig – Austria; Jacob Katsnelson – Russia
2005	Sunwook Kim – South Korea	Francesco Piemontesi – Switzerland; Gottlieb Wallisch – Austria
2007	Hisako Kawamura – Japan	Alina Elena Bercu – Romania; Yana Vasilyeva – Russia
2009	Adam Laloum – France	Nima Sarkechik – France / Iran; François Dumont – France
2011	Cheng Zhang – China	Zhi Chao Julian Jia – China; Joo Hyeon Park – South Korea
2013	Cristian Budu – Brazil	Dmitry Mayboroda – Russia; François-Xavier Poizat – Switzerland; Ainobu Ota – USA/Japan
2015	no winner	Guillaume Bellom – France; Benedek Horváth – Hungary; Yukyeong Ji – South Korea
2017	Mao Fujita – Japan	Aristo Sham – Hong Kong; Alberto Ferro – Italy
2019	no winner	Zhu Wang – China; Jorge González Buajasan – Cuba; Hyelim Kim – South Korea
2021	Yumeka Nakagawa – Japan/Germany	Wataru Mashimo – Japan; Juhee Lim – South Korea
2023	Magdalene Ho – Malaysia	Arthur Hinnewinkel – France; Elizaveta Ukrainskaia – Russia
