= European Piano Competition Bremen =

International piano competition

The European Piano Competition Bremen (German: Europäischer Klavierwettbewerb Bremen, also known as the Bremer Klavierwettbewerb) is an international piano competition held every 2 years in Bremen. It was founded in 1987 by Radio Bremen. The competition is open to pianists from all over Europe, including the musicians from CIS states, Turkey and Israel.

Due to its high artistic requirements and esteemed jury, the European Piano Competition Bremen gained a reputable position among international competitions since its inception. The Competition is organized by Radio Bremen, the Sparkasse Bremen, the Glocke, the Sendesaal Bremen and the Bremen Philharmonic Orchestra. From the very beginning competition has always been overseen by the current Minister for Foreign of Germany.

== List of winners ==
Source.

1. (West Germany) Andreas Woyke (1987)
2. (West Germany) Manfred Kratzer (1989)
3. (Soviet Union) Nadja Rubanenko and (Israel) Daniel Gortler, jointly (1991)
4. (France) Cédric Tiberghien and (Germany) Igor Kamenz, jointly (1993)
5. (Italy) Filippo Gamba (1995)
6. Peter Laul (Russia) (1997)
7. (Turkey) Emre Elivar and (Russia) Alexandre Pirojenko, jointly (1999)
8. (Uzbekistan) Eugene Mursky (2001)
9. (Bulgaria) Julian Gorus (2003)
10. (Germany) David Meier (2005)
11. (Russia) Yana Vasilyeva (2007)
12. (Russia) Violetta Khachikyan (2009)
13. (United Kingdom) Jamie Bergin (2012)
14. (Kazakhstan) Stanislav Khegai and (France) Jean-Paul Gasparian, jointly (2014)
15. (Russia) Elizaveta Ukrainskaia (2016)
16. (Czech Republic) Marek Kozák (2018)
17. (Belgium) Valère Burnon (2021)
18. (France) Théotime Gillot (2024)

== Jury ==
- 2024
  - Konstanze Eickhorst, Germany – Chair
  - Silke Avenhaus, Germany
  - Carsten Dürer, Germany
  - Christopher Elton, Great Britain
  - Roland Krüger, Germany
  - Varvara Nepomnyashchaya, Russia / Germany
  - Andrzej Pikul, Poland
- 2021
  - Konstanze Eickhorst, Germany – Chair
  - Ian Fountain, United Kingdom
  - Andreas Groethuysen, Germany
  - Violetta Khachikyan, Russia
  - Matthias Kornemann, Germany
  - Gülsin Onay, Turkey
  - Erik Tawaststjerna, Finland
- 2018
  - Konstanze Eickhorst, Germany – Chair
  - Olivier Gardon, France
  - Klaus Hellwig, Germany
  - Elza Kolodin, Poland
  - Jevgeny Koroliov, Russia
  - Peter Laul, Russia
  - Florian Ludwig, Germany
- 2016
  - Konstanze Eickhorst, Germany – Chair
  - Boris Bloch, Ukraine
  - Finghin Collins, Ireland
  - Ewa Kupiec, Poland
  - Piers Lane, Australia
  - David Meier, Germany
  - Mitsuko Shirai, Japan
- 2014
  - Konstanze Eickhorst, Germany – Chair
  - Hamish Milne, United Kingdom
  - Eugene Mursky, Berlin
  - Alfredo Perl, Chile
  - Catherine Rückwardt, US
  - Henri Sigfridsson, Finland
  - Tamas Vesmas, Romania
- 2012
  - Konstanze Eickhorst, Germany – Chair
  - Aquiles Delle Vigne, Argentina
  - Gerald Fauth, Germany
  - Julian Gorus, Bulgaria
  - Karen Kamensek, Chicago
  - Jonathan Plowright, United Kingdom
  - Nina Tichman, New York
- 2009
  - Konstanze Eickhorst, Germany – Chair
  - Peter Cossé, Austria
  - Julian Gorus, Bulgaria
  - Emanuel Krasovsky, Israel
  - Gitti Pirner, Germany
  - Matti Raekallio, Finland
  - Maria Tipo, Italy
- 2007
  - Konstanze Eickhorst, Germany – Chair
  - Pi-Hsien Chen, Taiwan
  - Homero Francesch, Switzerland
  - Filippo Gamba, Italy
  - Kalle Randalu, Estonia
  - Wilfried Schäper, Germany
  - Nina Tichman, US
- 2005
  - Peter Schilbach, Germany – Chair
  - Peter Cossé, Austria
  - András Hamary, Hungary
  - Heinz Medjimorec, Austria
  - Gülsin Onay, Turkey
  - Cécile Ousset, France
  - Begoña Uriarte, Spain
- 2003
  - Peter Schilbach, Germany – Chair
  - Peter Cossé, Austria
  - Ewa Kupiec, Poland
  - Nikolaus Lahusen, Germany
  - Maria Tipo, Italy
  - Begoña Uriarte, Spain
  - Arie Vardi, Israel
- 2001
  - Jürgen Meyer-Josten, Germany – Chair
  - Konstanze Eickhorst, Germany
  - Pi-Hsien Chen, Taiwan
  - Heinz Medjimorec, Austria
  - Anne Queffélec, France
  - Einar Steen-Nokleberg, Norway
  - Kurt Seibert, Germany
- 1999
  - Peter Schilbach, Germany – Chair
  - Peter Cossé, Austria
  - Valentin Gheorghiu, Romania
  - Cécile Ousset, France
  - Peter Rösel, Germany
  - Maria Tipo, Italy
  - Begoña Uriarte, Spain
- 1997
  - Jürgen Meyer-Josten, Germany – Chair
  - Peter Cossé, Austria
  - Valentin Gheorghiu, Romania
  - Cécile Ousset, France
  - Kurt Seibert, Germany
  - Einar Steen-Nökleberg, Norway
  - Begoña Uriarte, Spain
- 1995
  - Peter Schilbach, Germany – Chair
  - Maria Tipo, Italy
  - Nina Tichman, USA
  - Gülsin Onay, Turkey
  - Catherine Vickers, Canada
  - Homero Francesch, Uruguay
  - Roland Keller, Germany
- 1993
  - Jürgen Meyer-Josten, Germany – Chair
  - Kurt Bauer, Germany
  - Bernhard Ebert, Germany
  - Gerhard Erber, Germany
  - Valentin Gheorghiu, Romania
  - Renate Kretschmar-Fischer, Germany
  - Gülsin Onay, Turkey
  - Klaus Schilde, Germany
- 1991
  - Peter Schilbach, Germany – Chair
  - Volker Banfield, Germany
  - Karl Betz, Germany
  - Valentin Gheorghiu, Romania
  - Gitti Pirner, Germany
  - Annerose Schmidt, Germany
  - Arie Vardi, Israel
  - Dinorah Varsi, Switzerland
- 1989
  - Klaus Bernbacher, West Germany – Chair
  - Pavel Gililov, USSR
  - Eliza Hansen, West Germany
  - Margarita Höhenrieder, West Germany
  - Detlef Kraus, West Germany
  - Annerose Schmidt, GDR
- 1987
  - Klaus Bernbacher, West Germany – Chair
  - Bernhard Ebert, West Germany
  - Eliza Hansen, West Germany
  - Germaine Mounier, France
  - Kurt Seibert, West Germany
  - Janos Solyom, Sweden
