= Savonlinna Music Academy =

Music academy in Finland

Savonlinna Music Academy (Finnish: Savonlinnan musiikkiakatemia) is an association in Savonlinna, Finland, organizing international master classes in Savonlinna and abroad. On the master classes, internationally renowned musicians teach young talented singers and instrumentalists in the field of opera, lied and chamber music.

Savonlinna Music Academy originated from Savonlinna Music Days organized by Finnish composer Yrjö Kilpinen in the 1950s. During the Music Days, teaching for young musicians was organized. The history of Savonlinna Music Academy thus goes back to times before Savonlinna Opera Festival made the small town internationally known. Currently, master classes are organized within the framework Savonlinna Summer University (open university) teaching. Savonlinna Music Academy is directed by an artistic committee. The chair of the artistic committee is pianist Ralf Gothóni. The managing director of Savonlinna Music Academy Association is operationally responsible for activities.

Mainly master classes are organized in July when also Savonlinna Opera Festival takes place. For students this gives the opportunity to meet and hear many artists visiting Savonlinna for the festival. Concerts organized the Music Academy attract people coming to Savonlinna for opera and classical music. Instruction in singing comprises in addition to opera and lied also of teaching for vocalist–piano duos. In the chamber music master classes, student and teachers make music together.

Similar teaching models are the Steans Institute of Ravinia Festival and the Mozarteum Orchestra.

Instructors in lied have been Helmut Deutsch, Irwin Cage, Hartmut Höll, Graham Johnson and Roger Vignoles. In opera Ileana Cotrubaș, Thomas Hemsley, Dorothy Irving, Yevgeny Nesterenko, Peter Pears, Mitsuko Shirai and Sarah Walker have been active. During the last years teachers mainly responsible have been Tom Krause and director Eija Tolpo.

Savonlinna Music Academy has also made own productions such as Wolfgang Amadeus Mozart's Così fan tutte and the Italienisches Liederbuch of Hugo Wolf as an arrangement for chamber orchestra and two voices in 2005. In 2011 the Academy produced the comic opera Il matrimonio segreto by Domenico Cimarosa. The production also toured at Mustasaari Music Festival and in Detmold, Germany. In 2010 instruction in music technology and in 2011 in recording technology was started in cooperation with Sibelius Academy and Hochschule für Musik Detmold.

The international activities of the Savonlinna Music Academy have included master classes in Cairo, Egypt, where courses have been organized for Egyptian students in 2009 and 2010. Participating teachers in Cairo were pianist Ralf Gothoni, violist Teemu Kupiainen, cellist professor Arto Noras, director Eija Tolpo and pianist Jari Hiekkapelto. Egyptian musicians have also participated in master classes in Savonlinna.
