= Stanislav Khegai =

Kazakhstani pianist (born 1985)

- Stanislav Khegai

Background information
- Born: 1985 (age 40–41); Almaty, Kazakhstan
- Genre: Classical
- Occupation: Musician
- Instrument: Piano
- Years active: 1998–present

Stanislav Khegai (born 1985) is a Kazakhstani pianist. He is the winner of the 2014 European Piano Competition Bremen, a prize winner of the 2007 Queen Elisabeth Competition, the 2006 Concours Géza Anda and won second prize at the 2004 International Scriabin Piano Competition.

== Biography ==
At fifteen, Khegai was awarded the Grand-Prix at the International Piano Competition of Central Asia. The following year, he performed Rachmaninoff's Piano Concerto No. 3 with a philharmonic orchestra. At the age of 18, he won the second prize at the 3rd International Scriabin Piano Competition in Moscow in 2004. In 2006, he was awarded the Arirang Prize in Arts in Kazakhstan. He is the prize winner of the 15th Queen Elisabeth International Music Competition in Brussels, Belgium and the 10th Concours Géza Anda in Zurich, Switzerland.

In March 2014, he won the 14th European Piano Competition in Bremen, Germany. From 2012 to 2014, he was awarded three times the DAAD scholarship in Bonn, Germany.

Khegai gave recitals in Germany, France, Belgium, Switzerland, Italy, Morocco, Estonia, Kazakhstan, Japan, Canada, South Korea, and other countries. In November 2013, he performed Brahms's Piano Concerto No. 2 in the Great Hall of Gewandhaus zu Leipzig. He gave concerts in world venues, such as the Centre for Fine Arts BOZAR and Royal Theatre of La Monnaie in Brussels, Salle Cortot in Paris, Gewandhaus Leipzig, Radio Bremen Sendesaal and Glocke in Bremen, Great Hall of Tchaikovsky Conservatory, Guro Arts Valley Theater in Seoul, Schumann-Haus, Gasteig in Munich, Ansan Arts Center and has performed with prestigious orchestras, including the Leipzig Gewandhaus Orchestra, Orchestre National de Belgique, Bremen Philharmonic, Orchestre Royal de Chambre de Wallonie, Moscow Symphony Orchestra, Moravian Philharmonic and Gyeonggi Philharmonic Orchestra. He has collaborated with conductors such as Gilbert Varga, Paul Goodwin, Nicholas Milton, Matthias Foremny and Volker Schmidt-Gertenbach, among others.

In the 2008/09 season, he toured Germany with the Moravian Philharmonic Orchestra performing Beethoven's Piano Concerto No. 1, Op. 15. In July 2007, he performed a recital at the Mecklenburg–Vorpommern Festival with the works of Schubert, Brahms, Beethoven and Schumann. Stanislav Khegai gave recitals at Festivals, such as Les Nuits Musicales de Nice Festival in France, the Pianissimo Festival in Tartu, the 2010 Asian Composers League International Festival and the UNESCO World Forum in Seoul. In April 2017, he performed, among other works, Ravel's Miroirs at the After Work Concert Series in the Leipzig Gewandhaus. He was broadcast live by Radio Bremen, NDR, MDR, BR, RTBF, Klara Radio, Musiq3, KBS, and others. In 2024-2025, Khegai performed Tchaikovsky Piano Concerto No. 1, as well as some concerts in Central Concert Hall in Astana performing Beethoven Piano Concerto No. 1, Gershwin Rhapsody in Blue among others and Rachmaninoff Piano Concerto No. 2 in Bishkek, Almaty.

== Discography ==
- Ravel, Brahms: (Radio Bremen; 2014)
- Beethoven: (Queen Elisabeth Competition Winners CD)
- Scriabin: Valse in A-flat major Op. 38 – Mazurka Op. 25 No. 3 – Sonata No. 9 Op. 68 (Classical Records; 2004)
