= Uhrmacher =

Uhrmacher (German for "watchmaker" or "clockmaker") is a German surname. Notable people with the surname include:

- Hildegard Uhrmacher (born 1939), German operatic soprano
- Tillmann Uhrmacher (1967–2011), German electronic DJ
