= Flute Concerto No. 1 (Jolivet) =

1949 concert by André Jolivet

André Jolivet wrote his Flute Concerto No. 1 in 1949. It is scored for solo flute and strings and was premièred on 24 January 1950 by soloist Jean-Pierre Rampal. Jolivet wrote a concerto for flute and percussion in 1965.

The work lasts about 13 minutes. It is now part of the standard flute repertoire and several prominent flautists have recorded it. The work was published by Éditions Heugel; they also published a version for flute and piano.

== Background ==
Jolivet associated the sound of the flute with "the breath of life" and was particularly fascinated by its "primitive" connotations.

In 1944, he wrote Chant de Linos for a competition at the Paris Conservatoire. Jean-Pierre Rampal won the First Prize and he and Jolivet became close friends. Five years later, the composer wrote the Flute Concerto for Rampal.

== Overview ==
The concerto is cast in four short movements that follow a slow–fast–slow–fast structure reminiscent of the 17th-century Italian sonata da chiesa.

1. Andante cantabile
2. Allegro scherzando
3. Largo
4. Allegro risoluto

Although tonally adventurous, the work is notable for its melodic simplicity and lack of gratuitous virtuosity, which sets it apart from the Romantic tradition of showy concertos. The piece starts with a soft, melancholy melody but gets more and more agitated and dissonant as the strings enter, although some brighter passages still appear occasionally. After the dark slow movement the work ends with an Allegro risoluto and a propulsive, thrilling finale.

As critic Antoine Goléa remarked: "This is one of Jolivet's works where violence gives way to tenderness, force and passion yield to charm... sometimes lyrical, sometimes piquant and capricious."

== Recordings ==
- Sarah Louvion (flute) – Ensemble du Festival Flûte-Haubois en Livradois – Conductor: Ariel Zuckermann, Farao Classics – B108032 (2008).
- Jean-Pierre Rampal (flute) – Orchestre Lamoureux – Conductor: André Jolivet – Recorded in 1966, Warner – Erato 2564 61320-2 (2004).
- Alexander Korneev (flute) – Moscow Radio Symphony Orchestra – Conductor: André Jolivet, Melodia D-017-995-8 (1966).
- Aurèle Nicolet (flute) – Orchestre Régional Provence Côte d’Azur – Conductor: Philippe Bender, Lyrinx 8211/029 (1983).
- Susan Milan (flute) – City of London Sinfonia – Conductor: Richard Hickox, Chandos Records CHAN 8840 (1989).
- Petri Alanko (flute) – Finnish Radio Symphony Orchestra – Conductor: Jukka-Pekka Saraste, Ondine Records – ODE 802-2 (1993).
- Manuela Wiesler (flute) – Tapiola Sinfonietta – Conductor: Paavo Järvi, Bis Records – 739 (1996).
- Sarah Louvion (flute) – Ensemble du Festival Flûte-Haubois en Livradois – Conductor: Ariel Zuckermann, Farao Classics – B108032 (2008).
- Sami Junnonen (flute) – Helsinki Chamber Orchestra – Conductor: James S. Kahane, Resonus Classics – RES10335 (2024).
