= Greta Hofer =

Greta Hofer may refer to:

- Greta Hofer (opera singer)
- Greta Hofer (model)
