= HKV =

HKV may refer to:

- Helsingin Kisa-Veikot, Finnish athletics club, founder of Helsinki Grand Prix
- HKV, abbreviation of Swedish Högkvarteret, level of command within the Swedish Armed Forces
- HKV, abbreviation for Hannoversche Künstlerverein, German association of artists that included Reimar Dahlgrün
- HKV, IATA code for Haskovo Malevo Airport, an airport in Bulgaria
- Handmade Kultur Verlag, in publication edited by Annelie Grund
- Hollandse Kamermuziek Vereniging, organization co-founded by Johan van Hell
