= Sony Classical Records =

American record label

Sony Classical
- Parent company: Sony Music Entertainment (SME)
- Founded: 1924; 102 years ago (as Columbia Masterworks Records)
- Distributor: Sony Masterworks
- Genre: Classical
- Country of origin: United States
- Official website: www.sonyclassical.com

Sony Classical is an American record label founded in 1924 as Columbia Masterworks Records, a subsidiary of Columbia Records. In 1980, the Columbia Masterworks label was renamed as CBS Masterworks. The CBS Records Group was acquired by Sony in 1988, and in 1990 it was renamed Sony Classical.

== Artists ==
Sony Classical has represented artists including:

- Alexis Ffrench
- Anna Lapwood
- Yo-Yo Ma
- Igor Levit
- Jonas Kaufmann
- Stjepan Hauser
- Glenn Gould
- Mario Frangoulis
- Wiener Philharmoniker
- Joshua Bell
- Hans Zimmer
- John Williams
- Khatia Buniatishvili
- Arthur Rubinstein
- Eugene Ormandy
- Leonard Bernstein
- Teodor Currentzis
- Arcadi Volodos
- Christian Gerhaher
- Vladimir Horowitz
- Christoph Koncz
- Ivo Pogorelich
- Martin Fröst
- Leif Ove Andsnes
- Lavinia Meijer
- Rachel Willis-Sørensen
- Mao Fujita
- Pablo Ferrández
- Miloš Karadaglić
- Attacca Quartet
- Hayato Sumino
- Vittorio Grigolo

== Presidents ==
- 1997: Peter Gelb (NY)
- 2009–2019: Bogdan Roscic
- 2019: Per Hauber

== See also ==
- List of record labels
