= Flute Concerto No. 1 =

Flute Concerto No. 1 may refer to:

- Flute Concerto No. 1 (Jolivet)
- Flute Concerto No. 1 (Mozart)
