= Gotthard Kronstein =

German baritone

Gotthard Kronstein (14 January 1927 – 2 June 1997) was a German operatic baritone and theatre director.

== Life ==
Born in Kotzenau, Kronstein attended the elementary and Höhere Handelsschule in Glogau on the Oder and during the Second World War, he attended a special matriculation course in Königsberg. As a youth, he was still obliged to join the Wehrmacht in 1945 and ended up in war captivity.

Not even an adult, Kronstein came into the Luftangriffe 48 percent war-destroyed Hanover, where he was employed from 1946 to 1947 by the Hannover employment office as clerk for youth issues.

From 1947 to 1949, he assumed the chairmanship of the "Club junger Menschen" initiated by Theanolte Bähnisch and the Ada-und-Theodor-Lessing-Volkshochschule "Clubs junger Menschen". At the same time, Kronstein was able to begin his studies in 1947, first in economics, law and psychology at the Technische Hochschule Hannover, then in stage law and theatre management at the University of Cologne. He received his diploma in business administration in 1956.

While still a student in Hannover, Kronstein took private singing lessons with Irmel Holzapfel and Laurenz Hofer, who ran a singing studio with his wife Greta Hofer. Kronstein was awarded several prizes for vocal performances parallel to his studies, in Munich, in the Italian city of Vercelli and - with the first prize as baritone - in 1956 in Verviers, Belgium. Until 1968, he had engagements as a singer in Basel, Braunschweig and Essen.

From 1969 to 1975, Kronstein took over the management of three companies owned by his first wife's family.

In 1982, he married the opera singer Hildegard Uhrmacher.

From 1975 to 1989, Kronstein directed the Theatre am Aegi. In 1975, he joined the Hannoverscher Künstlerverein and took over its chairmanship from 1982 to 1993 in succession to Reimar Dahlgrün. In 1982, he became executive member of the Internationale Musikakademie für Solisten (IMAS) in Hannover.

Kronstein died in Hannover at the age of 70.

== Recordings ==
- Franz Schubert: Messe Es-Dur, Hannoversche Chorgemeinschaft, Göttinger Symphonie Orchester, Hannover 1983; 1982 concert recording in the Großer Sendesaal of the Norddeutscher Rundfunk in Hannover.
