= Ralf Gothóni =

Finnish-German pianist and conductor (born 1946)

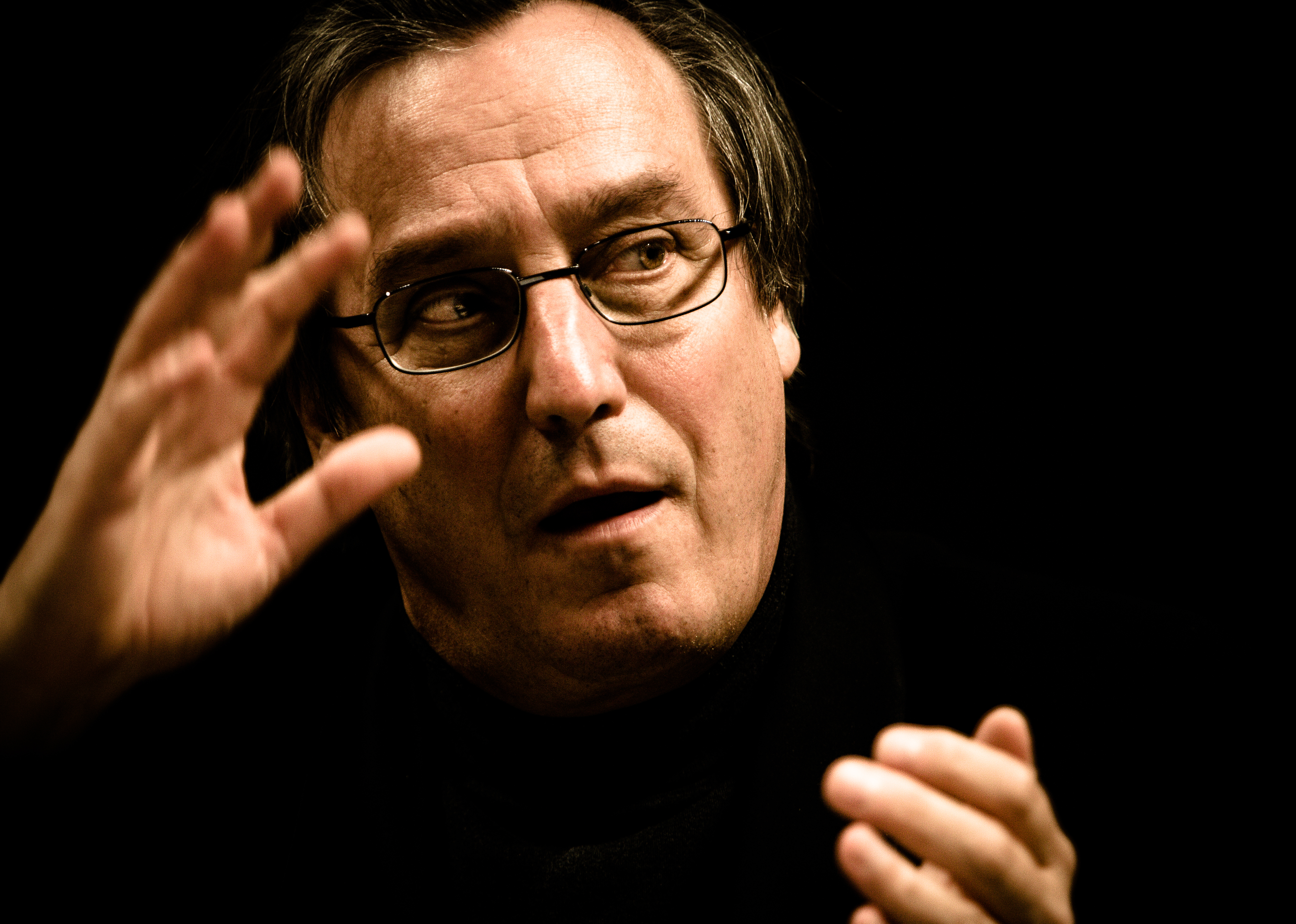
- Ralf Gothóni in the 2010s
- Born: 2 May 1946 (age 80); Rauma, Finland
- Occupations: Pianist; Conductor; Teacher; Composer
- Spouses: Arja Gothóni; Aila Rath-Gothóni; Elina Vähälä (div. 2013); Suzan Saber (m. 2013; div. 2022)
- Children: Mark Gothoni (b.1967); Maris Gothóni (b. 1979)
- Citizenship: Finland; Germany

Ralf Georg Nils Gothóni (born 2 May 1946) is a Finnish-German pianist and conductor. He is also active as a chamber musician, professor, composer, and author. Born in Rauma, he made his orchestra debut at age 15. Besides his worldwide concert career he has made some 100 recordings with major labels. He often performs in a double role conducting from the keyboard.

Gothóni has performed as a pianist and conductor on five continents with numerous renowned orchestras and singers, performed at almost all major music festivals and recorded almost 100 albums for several international labels.

Gothóni has performed at music festivals in Salzburg, Berlin, Prague, Aldeburgh, Edinburgh, Roque de Antheron, Ravinia and Tanglewood. He has appeared as a soloist with several orchestras, including the Chicago, Detroit and Toronto Symphony Orchestras, the Berlin and Warsaw Philharmonics, the Bavarian Radio Orchestra, the Japan Philharmonic and the English Chamber Orchestra. He performs in numerous concerts each year, both as a soloist and as a conductor, leading from the piano.

Gothóni began his musical studies as a violinist at the age of three. However, he switched from violin to piano at the age of five. When he had played the piano for the first time - his first piece was the Pori March - he broke his violin on the corner of the table. At the age of eight, he was accepted into the Sibelius Academy in Helsinki to study with Tapani Valsta at the Sibelius Academy, Helsinki and later with Ervin László in Fribourgh, Switzerland and Max Martin Stein in Düsseldorf.

Gothóni made his debut as an orchestral soloist at the age of 15, and in 1967 he performed at the Jyväskylä Summer Festival as “Debutante of the Year.” In the late 1960s, he worked as a rehearsal pianist at the Royal Stockholm Opera.

== Life and career ==
Gothóni made his recital debut in 1967 as the "Debutant of the year" at the Jyväskylä Summerfestival. Thereafter he performed as recitalist, orchestra soloist and chamber musician mostly in his home country until leaving Finland in 1977 after organizing his first project and landmark of his career; The Schubertiade in Helsinki: forty Finnish singers performed circa 450 lieder by Franz Schubert. Gothóni played all of them and soon, after moving to Berlin, he became famous as Lieder pianist appearing as partner with such singers as Jorma Hynninen, Martti Talvela, Arleen Augér, Edith Mathis, Anne Sofie von Otter, Ileana Cotrubas, Peter Schreier, and Barbara Hendricks. He performed in lied concerts until the mid-1990s, then focused on solo and chamber music repertoire, as well as orchestral conducting.

In Berlin Gothóni played many concerts as soloist and chamber musician in the early 1980s and he came together with the most important classical music agent who wanted have him on his roster. The discussions were not fruitful: The Agent asked Gothóni to make a decision about his character – to be everything - soloist, chamber musician and Lieder pianist was an illusion. Gothóni moved to Munich and from there to Hamburg where he stayed 18 years. He appeared as a versatile pianist in recitals, orchestra concerts, at chamber music festivals and tours with instrumentalists and singers until the mid 1990s. After being chosen for the American Gilmore Artist Award in 1994 he concentrated on solo and chamber concerts and started with conducting. In 2007 he made his last recital tour due to arthritis in the hands.

== Projects and positions of trust ==
Gothóni has been a professor at the Sibelius Academy from 1992 to 2007, at the Hochschule für Musik in Hamburg from 1986 to 1996, and at the Hanns-Eisler-Hochschule in Berlin from 1996 to 2000. In 2000, he was appointed visiting professor at the Royal College of Music in London, and in 2006 he began as professor of piano chamber music at the Instituto da Camara, Reina Sofia, Madrid. In 2010–2011, he also served as a visiting professor at the Hochschule für Musik Detmold and, since 2012, at the Hochschule für Musik Karlsruhe. In 2021, the Guildhall School of Music in London invited him to its faculty with the title "International Chair of Keyboard Chamber Music".

Gothóni gives master classes around the world, and has been a member of the faculty of the Steans Institute for Young Artists in Chicago for several summers. In recent years, Gothóni has also been invited to serve on the juries of major competitions (including New York, Minneapolis, Santander, Vevey, Stuttgart, Bolzano, Alaska, Qingdao) and to serve as international experts. As an opponent of music competitions, he has, however, participated in the juries of major piano competitions where pianists have been able to demonstrate their skills as a comprehensive musician, also in chamber music. Gothóni also conceived of a new kind of international competition in which pianists perform as soloists, chamber musicians, lied pianists and play a concerto while conducting an orchestra from the piano. The competition was held for the first time in October-November 2025 in cooperation with the Shanghai Conservatory and the Savonlinna Academy of Music.

Gothóni was the artistic director of the Savonlinna Opera Festival from 1984 to 1987. He created the Forbidden City Music Festival in Beijing in 1996 and the "Musical Bridge Egypt–Finland" in 2007. He was professor of chamber music at the Hochschule für Musik Hanns Eisler in Berlin 1996–2000, the Sibelius Academy in Helsinki 1992–2007, the Hochschule für Musik in Hamburg 1986–1996 and 2006–2012 at the Instituto International da Camara, Reina Sofia, Madrid. Gothóni has made a significant contribution to the education of young musicians through Savonlinna Music Academy where he has served as artistic director. He was principal conductor of the English Chamber Orchestra from 2000 to 2009. From 2004 to 2014 Gothóni was the guest conductor of the Deutsche Kammerakademie. He has been invited to many important competition juries such as Queen Elizabeth Competition, London International Piano Competition, The Busoni Competition, Clara Haskil International Piano Competition and Paloma O'Shea International Piano Competition.

In the United States, Gothóni was music director of the Northwest Chamber Orchestra (Seattle) from 2002 until 2006. His initial appearance with the orchestra in 2001 was highly acclaimed and led to his appointment in Seattle. In 2006 he resigned in the context of financial pressures on the orchestra. The orchestra was later dissolved.

== Recordings ==
Gothóni has made nearly 100 albums for several labels, including BIS, CPO, Decca, DGG, EMI, Finlandia and Ondine, with whom he made over 20 CDs in the 1990s with Franz Schubert as the main composer. Concert recordings include the acclaimed recording of Benjamin Britten's Piano Concerto with the Helsingborg Symphony Orchestra and Okko Kamu, including the original third movement of the composition. For Ondine, he also recorded the hour-long Heitor Villa-Lobos Piano Concerto (Choros XI) with the Finnish Radio Symphony Orchestra conducted by Sakari Oramo, and two piano concertos by Einojuhani Rautavaara with the Leipzig Radio Orchestra (Max Pommer) and the Bavarian Radio Orchestra (Jukka-Pekka Saraste).

Recent recordings include several CDs of music by Aulis Sallinen and Alfred Schnittke

Gothóni has premiered over a dozen concertos; in 2004 he played and conducted the premiere of Sir John Tavener's Pratirupa Piano Concerto in London at the composer's 60th birthday concert. In the 2005–2006 season he premiered the double concertos by Aulis Sallinen and Curtis Curtis-Smith with violinist Elina Vähälä. Gothóni is also regularly heard as a guest artist at major chamber music festivals.

== Published works ==
His writings include Luova hetki ("The Creative Moment", 1998), Pyöriikö kuu ("Does the moon rotate", 2001), Flyygelin kanssa ("With the grand piano", 2004) and Hämähäkki ("The Spider", 2014). His compositions include a full opera, three chamber operas, (Miraculous Message from a Strange Star, libretto by Hermann Hesse; Hunden, libretto by T. Wulff; Sun in the Sand, libretto by Viivi Luik); a chamber concerto for viola and chamber ensemble, "Peregrina", inspired by the Peregrina poems of the German poet Eduard Mörike, a concerto for piano 4-hands and the cantata The Ox and its Shepherd. His arrangement of Hugo Wolf's Italian Songbook and Robert Schumann's Dichterliebe have been performed with great success.

== Awards ==
In 1994, Gothóni won the US Gilmore Prize, one of the greatest classical music awards. He has also received the Schubert Medal of the Austrian Ministry of Culture in 1978, the Finnish Cultural Foundation's Recognition Award in 1983, and the Pro Finlandia Medal in 1990. In 2012, Queen Sofia of Spain honored him for his artistic and pedagogical achievements.

== Personal life ==
Gothóni's first spouse was Arja Gothóni; their son, Mark Gothóni (born 1967), is a violinist, chamber musician, and professor at the Berlin University of the Arts. His second spouse was Aila Rath-Gothóni; their son, Maris Gothóni (born 1979), is a pianist and poet. Aila Rath-Gothóni died in a traffic accident in 1996. His third spouse was violinist Elina Vähälä, but the marriage ended in divorce in 2013. Gothóni was married to violist Suzan Saber from 2013 to 2022.

Preceded by Jeffrey Tate	Principal Conductor, English Chamber Orchestra; 2000–2009	Succeeded by Paul Watkins (music director)
Preceded by Adam Stern	Music Director, Northwest Chamber Orchestra; 2002–2006	Succeeded by (no successor)
