= Christiane Iven =

German soprano (born 1965)

Christiane Iven (born 9 March 1965) is a German lied, concert and opera singer as well as a vocal teacher at the Hochschule für Musik und Theater München.

== Career ==
Iven was born in Hamburg as the youngest of three siblings of a North German merchant family.

She attended the old-language Gymnasium Christianeum until her Abitur in 1984. Afterwards, she studied singing and vocal pedagogy at the University of Music and Theatre Hamburg, first with Hans Kagel and later with Judith Beckmann. She completed her education in Dietrich Fischer-Dieskau's Lied class at the Universität der Künste Berlin.

In 1986, while still a student, Iven began her solo activities as a concert and lied singer and was also a permanent member of the NDR radio choir in Hamburg for several years.

From 1992 to 1996, she was engaged as lyric mezzo-soprano at the Theater Bremen and from 1996 to 2001, at the Nationaltheater Mannheim. From 2001 to 2006, she was a member of the Staatsoper Hannover ensemble, where she changed to soprano. This was followed by a permanent engagement at the Staatsoper Stuttgart, with which she remained associated until 2015. There and at various European opera houses, she sang roles like the Feldmarschallin (Der Rosenkavalier), Agathe (Der Freischütz), Marie (Wozzeck), Kundry (Parsifal), Ariadne (Ariadne auf Naxos), Alice Ford (Falstaff), Elvira (Don Giovanni), Emilia Marty (The Makropulos Affair), Sieglinde (Die Walküre) and Isolde (Tristan und Isolde).

Among the most important works of her concert repertoire were the oratorios by Johann Sebastian Bach, Lieder and symphonies by Gustav Mahler, Lieder by Franz Schubert, Johannes Brahms and Hugo Wolf, Lieder and oratorios by Robert Schumann, the great song cycles by Olivier Messiaen, orchestral Lieder by Alban Berg, the Vier letzte Lieder by Richard Strauss and Wagner's Wesendonck Lieder.

Iven gave concerts with the Academy of St. Martin in the Fields, the Royal Concertgebouw Orchestra, the Ensemble intercontemporain, the Münchner Philharmoniker, the NDR Elbphilharmonie Orchester, the Orchestre de Chambre de Lausanne, the Oslo Philharmonic, the Deutsches Symphonie-Orchester Berlin conducted by Marc Albrecht, Vladimir Ashkenazy, Teodor Currentzis, Michael Gielen, Nikolaus Harnoncourt, Heinz Holliger, Sir Neville Marriner, Matthias Pintscher. She gave Lieder recitals with Burkhard Kehring, Igor Levit, Wolfram Rieger, András Schiff and Jan Philip Schulze. She gave Lieder recitals at the Lucerne Festival, the Festspiele Mecklenburg-Vorpommern, the Schleswig-Holstein Musik Festival as well as at the Schwetzingen Festival. She gave her farewell to the stage and the concert podium in 2016.

== Teaching ==
From 2001 to 2007, Iven was professor at the Hochschule für Musik, Theater und Medien Hannover. Since the winter semester 2013/14, she has held a professorship for singing at the University of Music and Drama Munich.

In addition, she is a jury member at international singing competitions. She gave master classes, among others at the Internationale Musikakademie für Solisten (IMAS) in Schloss Bückeburg, at the National Taipei University, the Internationale Bachakademie Stuttgart, the Musikhochschule Luzern and the Internationale Sommerakademie Mozarteum Salzburg.

== Recordings ==
- Gustav Mahler (1860–1911): Des Knaben Wunderhorn. SWR SO Baden-Baden & Freiburg, with Hanno Müller-Brachmann, Michael Gielen Hänssler, DDD, 2009/11
- Alban Berg (1885–1935): Orchesterstücke op. 6 Nr. 1–3; Altenberg-Lieder op. 4; Sieben frühe Lieder. Strasbourg PO, Marc Albrecht Pentatone, DDD, 2007
- Robert Schumann (1810–1856): Szenen aus Goethes Faust. With Christian Gerharer, Werner Güra, Birgit Remmert among others at the Concertgebouw Orchestra Nikolaus Harnoncourt Label: RCOLive, DDD, 2008
- Franz Schubert (1797–1828): Mayrhofer-Lieder, Vol.2. with Burkhard Kehring, Klavier Schubert-Lied-Edition 12, Naxos 2003
- Die singende Stadt. Ein Film von Vadim Jendreyko. Eine Produktion von FILMTANK in Koproduktion mit der Staatsoper Stuttgart und ZDF / 3sat, 2011
