= John Owings =

American pianist and educator

- Born: 1943 (age 82–83)
- Occupations: Pianist and educator
- Known for: Solo, collaborative, and orchestral performances

Academic background
- Education: Bachelor of Music; Master of Science in Piano
- Alma mater: University of Texas; The Juilliard School

John Owings is an American pianist and educator. He was the Herndon Professor of Music and Chair of the Piano Division at Texas Christian University.

Owings is most known for his solo and collaborative recitals, and for his orchestral performances with symphony orchestras, as well as for his recordings of works by 19th, 20th, and 21st century composers. He won the gold medal at the Robert Casadesus International Piano Competition in Cleveland, as well as honors at the Vianna da Motta International Competition in Lisbon, the London Liszt Society Competition, and the Musical Arts Competition in Chicago.

== Early life and education ==
Owings was born in San Antonio, Texas. He earned his Bachelor of Music degree from the University of Texas in 1965. From 1965 to 1967, he was a Fulbright Scholar at the Royal College of Music in London. He later completed his Master of Science in Piano at The Juilliard School in 1970. His teachers have included Karl Leifheit, Dalies Frantz, Martin Canin, Rosina Lhévinne, Géza Anda, and Wilhelm Kempff.

== Career ==
Owings has held faculty positions at Indiana University, Oberlin Conservatory of Music, and Texas Christian University. He has appeared as a guest artist at several notable festivals, such as Music Fest Perugia, InterHarmony, PianoTexas International Academy and Festival, the Round Top Festival, and Bucaramanga.

Owings has also been a member of the jury for national and international competitions. During his 33 years as Chair of the Piano Division at Texas Christian University, he contributed to establishing the Artist Diploma program in Piano and the Master of Music degree in Collaborative Piano. He oversaw administrative areas, including auditions, policies, and events like Piano@TCU. He served as an academic advisor to piano majors. He was appointed as a Professor at Texas Christian University in 1990 and held the Harold D. and Imogene Herndon Endowed Professorship of Music from 1996 to 2023.

== Media coverage ==
Owings' work has garnered media attention, with his performances and recordings featured in publications and media outlets, including Fanfare, BBC Music Magazine, The Bulletin of the Society for American Musicians, and on BBC Radio. In a review of one of his concerts, Scott Cantrell wrote in the Dallas Morning News: "Mr. Owings delved far beneath and beyond notes and bar lines. He made everything he played seem like a living organism." Cantrell further remarked, "It was one of those concerts you feel lucky to have experienced". John Bell Young, writing in the American Record Guide, described Owings as "a phenomenally gifted musician" while reviewing his CD collaboration with violinist Fritz Gearhart. Anthony Tommasini praised one of Owings' performances in The New York Times, stating: "On his own, Mr. Owings excitingly dispatched the finger-twisting double-note passages in Casadesus's relentless 1946 Toccata, which mixes syncopated rhythms borrowed from jazz with grim modal harmonies".

== Works ==
Owings has performed in solo and chamber recitals, as well as concerto appearances at venues across the United States, Latin America, Europe, and Asia. His notable performances include nine concerts at Carnegie Hall's Weill Hall in New York, as well as appearances with the symphony orchestras of Chicago, Cleveland, Dallas, Denver, Fort Worth, Houston, San Antonio, the Boston Pops, the English Chamber Orchestra, the BBC Scottish and BBC Welsh Symphony Orchestras, and the National Symphony Orchestras of Colombia and Peru. His recordings feature piano compositions by Samuel Barber, Aaron Copland, Elliott Carter, Robert Casadesus, and Julius Reubke, along with chamber works by Eric Ewazen, Richard Lavenda, Elena Sokolowski, and Quincy Porter.

An advocate for chamber music, Owings has collaborated with musicians such as members of the Borromeo and Miró String Quartets, and violinists Nicholas Kitchen, Michael Shih, Stefan Milenkovich, and Fritz Gearhart. He has also performed with cellists Carlos Prieto, Yeesun Kim, Emilio Colón, Stephen Balderston, and Misha Quint. In 2001, he teamed with Misha Galaganov (viola) and Gary Whitman (clarinet) to establish Trio Con Brio, an ensemble that commissioned and premiered new works by living composers.

In addition to being a Steinway Artist, Owings received the Chancellor's Award for Distinguished Research and Creative Activity from Texas Christian University in 1993 for his performances of Beethoven's 32 Piano Sonatas. His highlights at TCU include performances of J.S. Bach's Goldberg Variations, all-Chopin and all-Schumann recitals, collaborations with the TCU Symphony Orchestra, and solo and collaborative recitals for PianoTexas International Festival and Academy.

== Selected discography ==
- Quincy Porter: The Unpublished Manuscripts. John Owings (piano), Fritz Gearhart (violin). 1999.
- The American Piano: Piano Sonatas by Samuel Barber, Aaron Copland & Elliott Carter. John Owings (piano). 1999.
- Beethoven: Six Piano Sonatas. 2001.
- Robert Casadesus: Complete Works for Violin. John Owings (piano), Fritz Gearhart (violin), Kathryn Lucktenberg (violin). 2001.
- Robert Casadesus: Piano Works. 2005.
- Julius Reubke: The Keyboard Works. John Owings (piano), H. Joseph Butler (organ). 2006.
- Trio Con Brio: A Musical Celebration. Gary Whitman (clarinet), Misha Galaganov (viola), John Owings (piano). 2012.
- Chiaroscuro: Chamber Music of Richard Lavenda. Gary Whitman (clarinet), Misha Galaganov (viola), John Owings (piano). 2013.

== Awards and honors ==
- 1963 – First Prize, G. B. Dealey National Competition
- 1965 – First Prize, Sorantin National Piano Competition
- 1968 – First Prize, London Liszt Society Competition
- 1975 – First Prize, Casadesus International Piano Competition
- 1980 – First Prize, Musical Arts Competition
- 1993 – Named a Steinway Artist, Steinway & Sons
- 1993 – Chancellor's Award for Distinguished Research and Creative Activity, Texas Christian University
