= Göttinger Symphonieorchester =

German symphony Orchestra

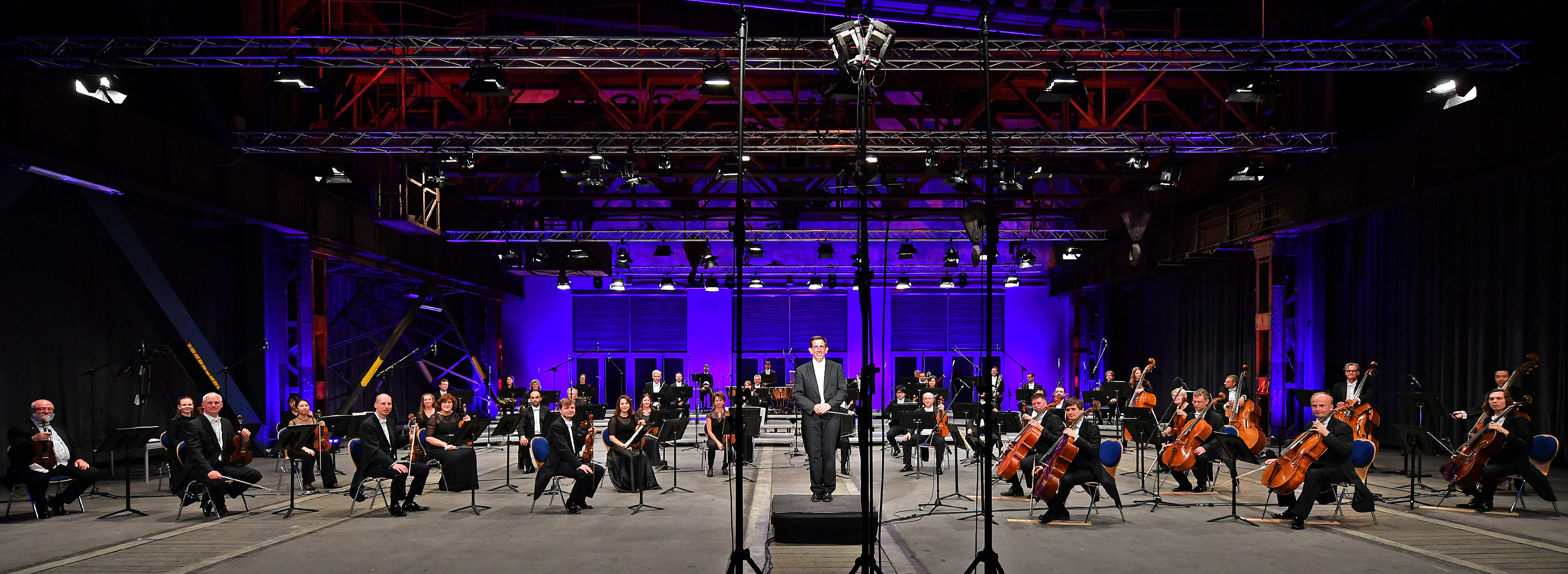
The Göttingen Symphony Orchestra in July 2020

The Göttinger Symphonieorchester (GSO) is the symphony orchestra of Göttingen, Germany. It was founded in 1862.

== History ==
Since its founding in 1862, outstanding artists such as Richard Strauss, Ferruccio Busoni, Max Reger, the Jochum brothers, Sir Georg Solti, Wilhelm Kempff, Gidon Kremer Martha Argerich, Heinrich Schiff, Rudolf Buchbinder, Simone Kermes, Dimitri Ashkenazy, Niklas Liepe, Albrecht Menzel and others have become musical companions of the Göttingen Symphony Orchestra.

Frank Peter Zimmermann has been an honorary member of the orchestra since 2001.

== Repertoire ==
The repertoire of the orchestra follows all historical and stylistic directions - from Baroque to New Music. In addition, works by contemporary artists are frequently presented. Numerous premieres bear witness to the orchestra's high commitment to New Musik.

== Concert activity ==
With more than 100 concerts a year, the Göttingen Symphony Orchestra offers its audience a wide-ranging programme. It is firmly anchored in the cultural life of Göttingen and, as "the travelling orchestra of Lower Saxony", is also an important orchestra in the Lower Saxony musical landscape. The orchestra is a regular guest at music festivals such as the Göttingen International Handel Festival, the Choriner Musiksommer, the Festspiele Mecklenburg-Vorpommern the Sommerliche Musiktage Hitzacker, the Niedersächsische Musiktage, the Harzburger Musiktage, the Domkonzerte Königslutter, the Walkenrieder Kreuzgangkonzerte and the Weilburger Schlosskonzerte.

In addition, there have been successful guest performances throughout Germany and in neighbouring countries. In 2017, a tournée took the orchestra among others to the People's Republic of China.

For years, the orchestra has been dedicating itself to new groups of visitors with great success. Concerts are offered in kindergartens, schools, hospitals and old people's homes in and outside Göttingen, and public dress rehearsals are organised especially for the target groups of children, young people, the disabled and older citizens.

In addition, there exist numerous CDs and radio recordings with the Göttingen Symphony Orchestra.

== Chief conductors since 1862 ==
- August Ferdinand Schmacht (1862–1886)
- Rudolf Bullerjahn (1886–1890)
- Eduard Gustav Wolschke (1890–1904)
- Walter Mundry (1904–1912)
- Phillip Werner (1913–1921)
- Heinz Schwier (1922–1932)
- Herbert Charlier (1932–1933)
- Hermann Henze (1933–1934)
- Fritz Volkmann (1934–1935)
- Hans Lenzer (1935–1936)
- Werner Ellinger (1936–1937)
- Mathieu Lange (1937–1943)
- Werner Bitter (1943–1946)
- Fritz Lehmann (1946–1950)
- Günther Weißenborn (1950–1957)
- Béla Hollai (1957–1962)
- Othmar Mága (1962–1967)
- Andreas Lukácsy (1968–1974)
- Volker Schmidt-Gertenbach (1968–1974 deputy chief conductor)
- Volker Schmidt-Gertenbach (1974–1989 chief conductor)
- Hermann Breuer (1982–1991 deputy chief conductor)
- Christian Simonis (1990–2005)
- Christoph-Mathias Mueller (2005–2018)
- Nicholas Milton (since 2018)

== Recordings (selection) ==
- Kikta, Rubtsov, Eshpai: Russian oboe concertos. Maria Sournatcheva (Oboe), Christoph-Mathias Mueller. Musikproduktion Dabringhaus & Grimm, Detmold (2016)
- Ludwig van Beethoven: Egmont; op. 84. Schauspielmusik zu Goethes Trauerspiel. Sony Music Entertainment, Munich (2013)
- Max Bruch: Arminius, oratorio; op. 43. (Libretto: Joseph Cüppers). Cpo-Musikproduktion, Georgsmarienhütte (2009)
- Max Bruch: Scottish fantasy; op. 46. Sabrina Höpcker, Vahlde (2009)
- Flötenkonzerte in romantischer Zeit. Leuenhagen und Paris, Hannover; TIM The International Music Company (Vertrieb), Hamburg (2001), ISBN 3-923976-29-1
- Literatur und Musik. Göttinger Symphonie-Orchester, Göttingen (2000)
- Waltzes and quadrilles from Vienna. Naxos Deutschland, Unterhaching (2000)
- Komponisten in Niedersachsen. Vol. 1 + 2. Thorofon, Wedemark (2000)
- Jean Françaix: L’apocalypse selon St. Jean. Schott Wergo Music Media, Mainz (1998)
- Johannes Brahms: Ein deutsches Requiem. Norbert Ehl, Wolfhagen (1985)
- Franz Schubert: Messe Es-Dur. Hannoversche Chorgemeinschaft, Hannover (1983)
