= Sarah Louvion =

French flautist

- Born: 1976 (age 48–49); France
- Education: Conservatoire à rayonnement régional de Douai; Conservatoire de Paris
- Occupation: Flautist
- Organizations: Frankfurter Opern- und Museumsorchester
- Website: www.sarahlouvion.com

Sarah Louvion (born 1976) is a French classical flautist. The award-winning player has been the principal flute of the Frankfurter Opern- und Museumsorchester from 2002, and is active as a soloist and chamber musician. She has given international master classes.

== Biography ==
A native of the north of France, Louvion studied flute at the Conservatoire à rayonnement régional de Douai, with Raymond Guiot, Philippe Pierlot and Vincent Lucas. She also studied mathematics and physics. She studied further at the Conservatoire de Paris, in the transverse flute classes of Alain Marion's and Sophie Cherrier, and in chamber music. She was accepted to further studies after graduation.

She has been invited to international festivals, such as the MIDEM of Cannes in 2000, in the framework of the "classical revelations" of the ADAMI. She has been invited to festivals such as the Pablo Casals Festival in Prades, to the Weilburger Schlosskonzerte in Germany, and to the International Festival of Colmar, where she premiered Guillaume Connesson's Flute Sonata which he dedicated to her.

Since 2002, Louvion has been principal flautist of the Orchestra of the Frankfurt Opera, the Frankfurter Opern- und Museumsorchester. She has played with the hr-Sinfonieorchester, the orchestra of the WDR Köln, the Bavarian Radio Symphony Orchestra, the Munich Opera Orchestra, the Bamberg Symphony, the Orchestre philharmonique de Radio France, the Orchestre National de France, and the Orchestre de l’Opéra de Lyon, among others.

She performed as a soloist with the Frankfurter Opern- und Museumsorchester, the Toulouse Chamber Orchestra, the Orchestre national d'Île-de-France, the Pasdeloup Orchestra, the Orchestre de chambre Amadeus, the Douai Orchestra, the Tokyo Ensemble, and the Moscow Chamber Orchestra, among others. After playing Bach's Orchestral Suite in B minor at the Frankfurt Alte Oper in December 2011, she played in February 2012 in Lisbon, Mozart's Concerto for Flute, Harp, and Orchestra, alongside harpist Xavier de Maistre, with the Gulbenkian Orchestra conducted by Bertrand de Billy.

Her partners in recitals are the pianist Delphine Bardin, and the harpist Françoise Friedrich. Numerous engagements have taken her regularly to Asia, where she has also given master classes.

== Awards ==
Louvion has won numerous prizes at international competitions. In 1999 she won the 2nd prize at the "Syrinx" International Competition in Rome and in 2001 first prize of the Kobe International Flute Competition in Japan, as well as the 3rd prize of the Geneva International Music Competition. In December 2011, she won the international Pro Musicis prize in the category "Soloist" in Paris.

== Recording ==
Louvion's first recording appeared in 2008, with the Ensemble du Festival flûte-haubois en Livradois, conducted by Ariel Zuckermann. It contains French 20th-century music with a solo flute, Pierre-Philippe Bauzin's Concerto for flute and strings, Op. 22, André Jolivet's quintet Chant de Linos for flute, violon, viola, cello and harp, Albert Roussel's: Sérénade for the same ensemble, Op. 30, and Jacques Ibert's Pièce for solo flute.
