= Marioara Trifan =

American pianist and conductor

Marioara Trifan (born 8 March 1950) is an American pianist and conductor who performs internationally.

== Career ==
Trifan was born in Los Angeles and grew up in New Jersey. She studied at the Curtis Institute of Music, Philadelphia, and at the Juilliard School, New York, where she received bachelor's and master's degrees. She won prizes at several international piano competitions, such as the Ferruccio Busoni International Piano Competition (1971), the Premio Jaén (1973), the Paloma O'Shea Santander International Piano Competition (1975), the Concorso Internazionale Dino Ciani in Milan (1975), the Sydney International Piano Competition (1977) and the Clara Haskil International Piano Competition (1981).

She made her conducting debut in 1985 at the National Theatre Mannheim and has since extensively conducted operas, symphonies, and ballet in Germany and the United States. Trifan was First Kapellmeister at Theater Koblenz from 1994 to 1998. Since then, she has been a professor and musical director at the Opera School of the Hochschule für Musik und Theater München in Munich and gives frequent masterclasses in Europe and America.
