= André Jolivet =

French composer (1905–1974)

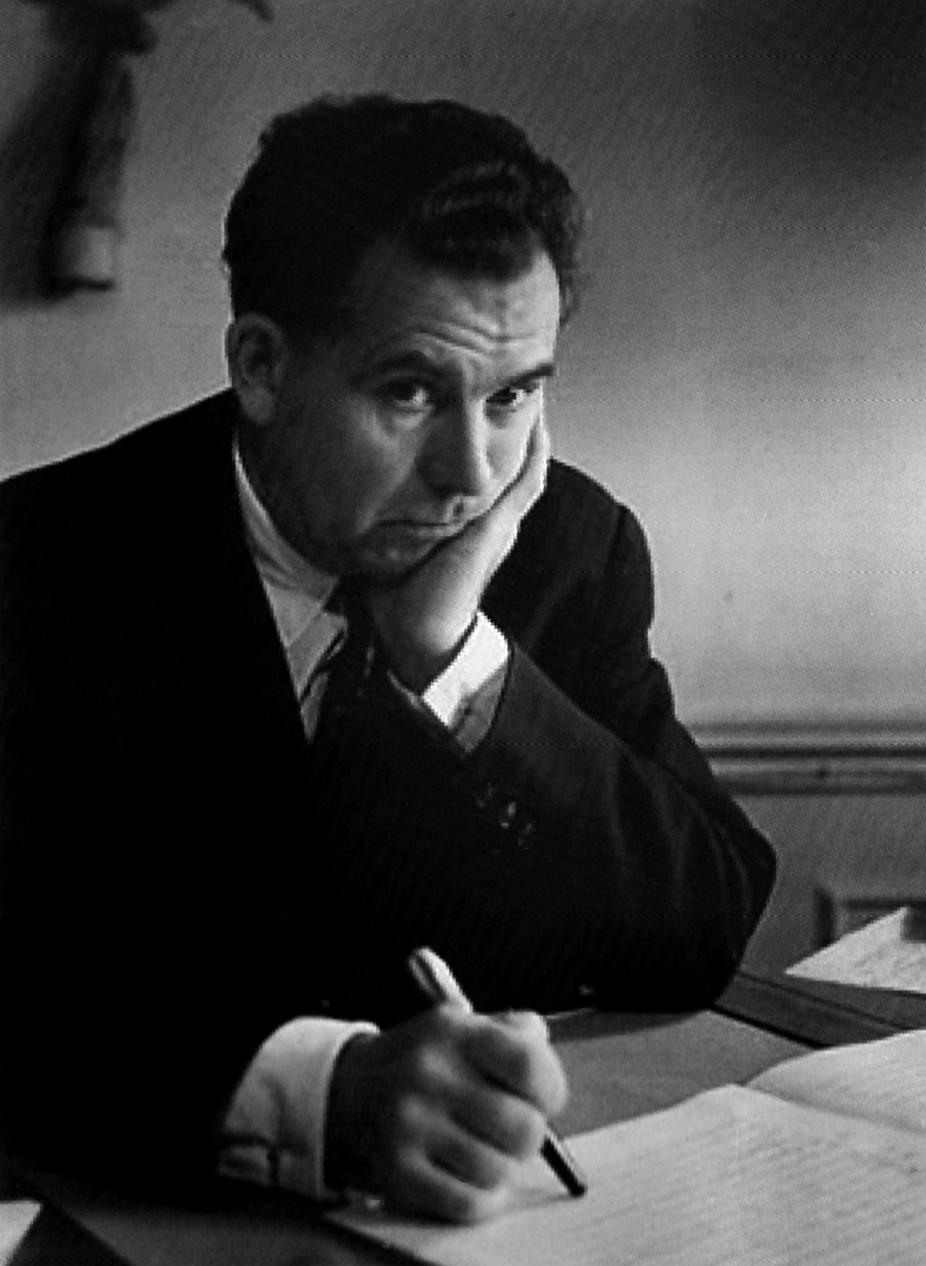
André Jolivet in 1930

André Jolivet (pronounced [ɑ̃dʁe ʒɔlivɛ]; 8 August 1905 – 20 December 1974) was a French composer. Known for his devotion to French culture and musical thought, Jolivet drew on his interest in acoustics and atonality, as well as both ancient and modern musical influences, particularly on instruments used in ancient times. He composed in a wide variety of forms for many different types of ensembles.

== Life ==
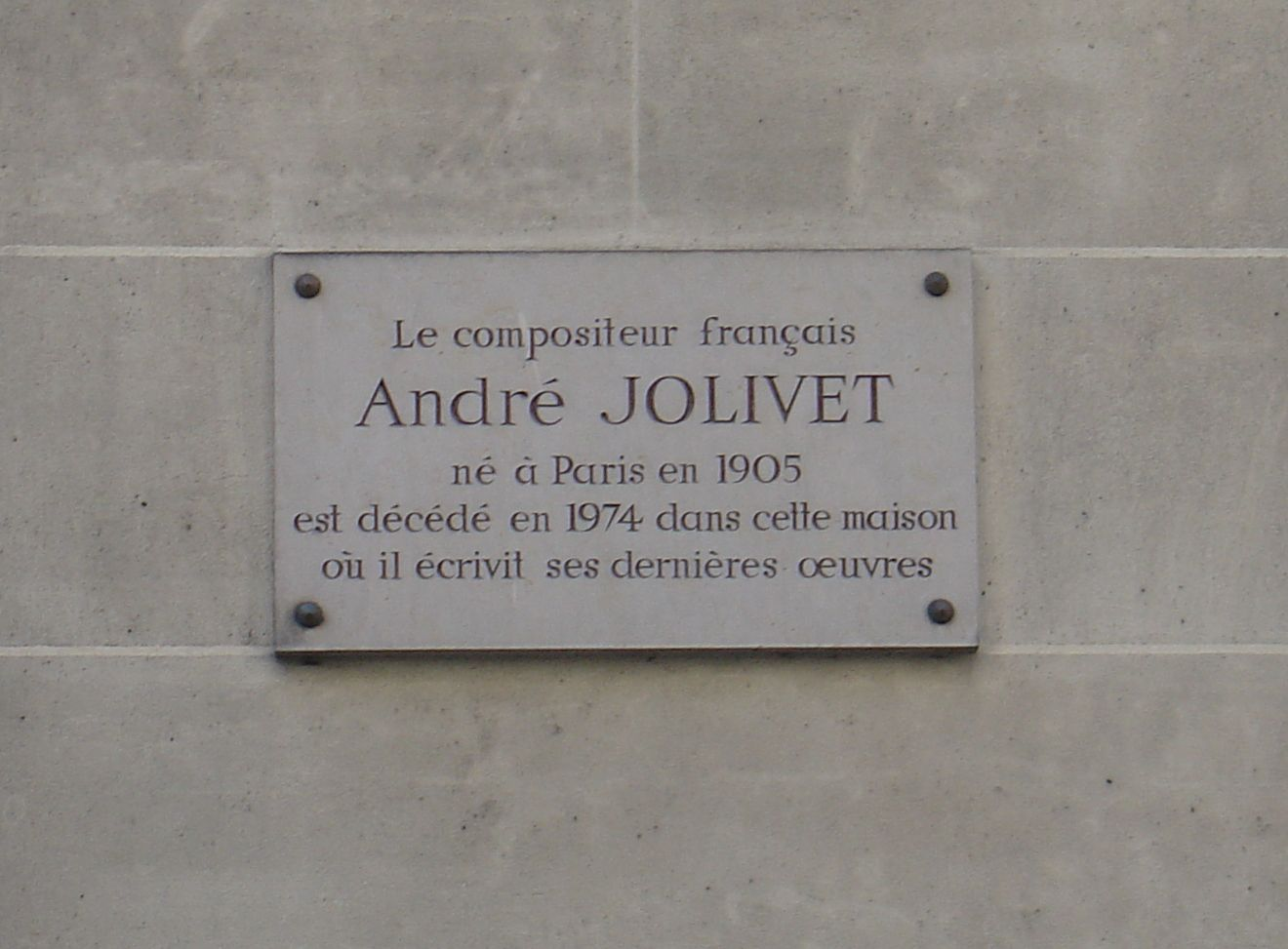
Plaque at 59 Rue de Varenne, Paris, commemorating André Jolivet

André Jolivet was born on 8 August 1905, at rue Versigny in Montmartre, Paris, the son of Victor-Ernest Jolivet and Madeleine Perault; his father an artist, his mother a pianist. Jolivet developed an interest in the arts early in his life, taking up painting and cello lessons at the age of 14. However, he was encouraged by his parents to become a teacher, going to teachers' college and teaching primary school in Paris (taking three years in between to serve in the military). One of his own teachers, however, believed Jolivet had a future in music, strongly encouraged him to pursue composition, and introduced him to Paul Le Flem, Jolivet's first teacher in composition. Le Flem gave Jolivet a firm grounding in classical forms of harmony and counterpoint. After hearing his first concert of Arnold Schoenberg, Jolivet became interested in atonal music, and then on Le Flem's recommendation became the only European student of Edgard Varèse, who passed on his knowledge of musical acoustics, atonal music, sound masses, and orchestration. In 1936 Jolivet co-founded the group La jeune France along with composers Olivier Messiaen, Jean-Yves Daniel-Lesur, and Yves Baudrier, who were attempting to re-establish a more human and less abstract form of composition. La jeune France developed from the avant-garde chamber music society La Spirale, formed by Jolivet, Messiaen, and Daniel-Lesur the previous year.

=== Private life ===
Jolivet married twice, firstly violinist Martine Barbillion in 1929; they had a daughter, Francoise-Martine (1930–2004). In 1933, he married Hilda Ghuighui (also spelt Guigue) (1906–1996), and they had three children, Pierre-Alain (1935–2005), Christine (b. 1940), and Merri (1943-2014).

=== Death ===
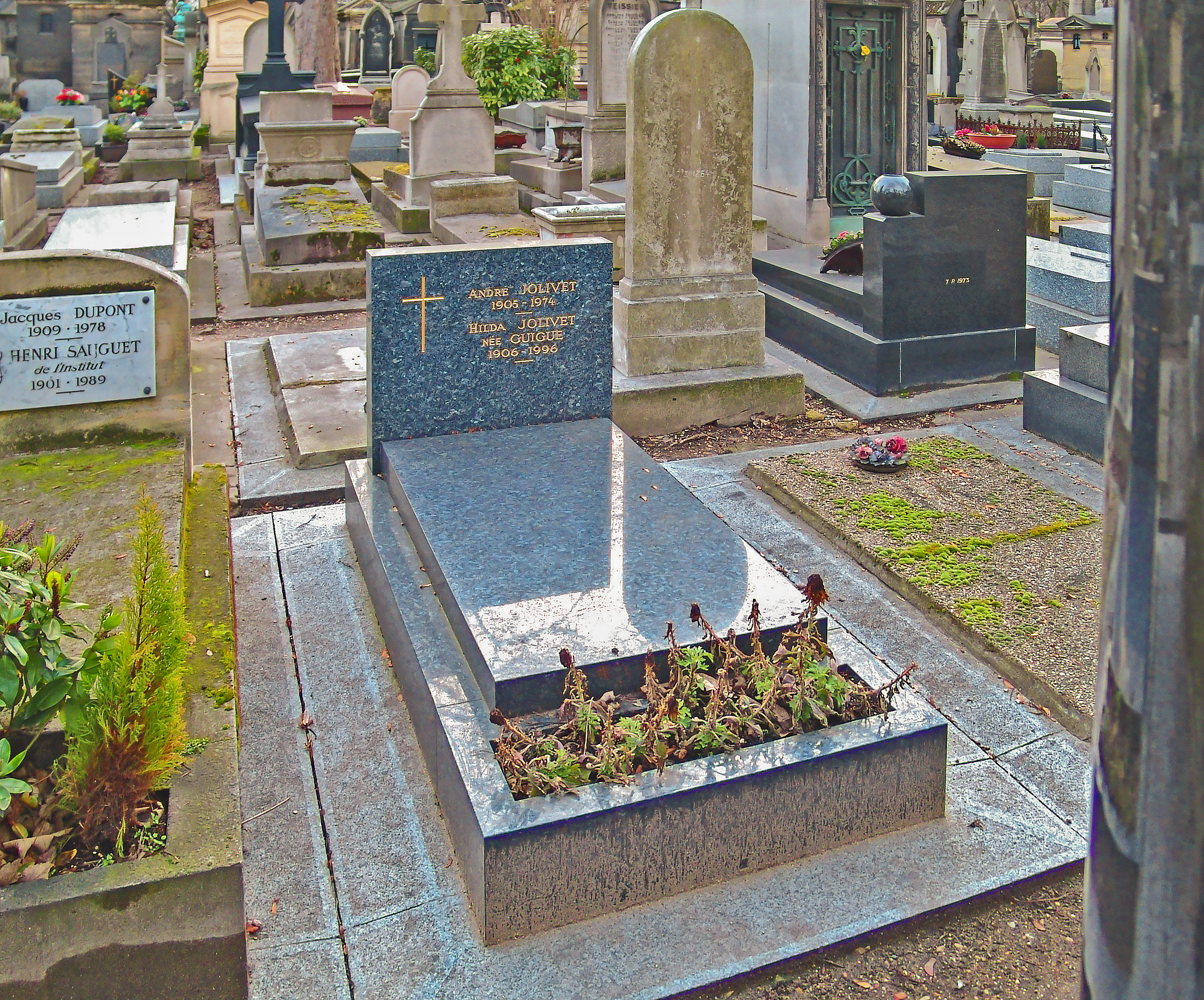
Jolivet's grave next to that of Henri Sauguet

Jolivet died in Paris in 1974 aged 69, leaving unfinished his opera Le Soldat inconnu. He was buried at Montmartre Cemetery next to the composer Henri Sauguet (section 27, near the grave of Hector Berlioz).

== Career ==
Jolivet's aesthetic ideals underwent many changes throughout his career. His initial desire as an adolescent was to write music for the theater, which inspired his first compositions, including music for a ballet. Claude Debussy, Paul Dukas, and Maurice Ravel were to be his next influences after he heard a concert of their work in 1919; he composed several piano pieces while training to become a teacher before going to study with Le Flem. Schoenberg and Varèse were strongly evident in his first period of maturity as a composer, during which his style drew heavily upon atonality and modernistic ideas. Mana (1933), the beginning of his "magic period", was a work in six parts for piano, with each part named after one of the six objects Varèse left with him before moving to the United States. Jolivet's intent as a composer throughout his career was to "give back to music its original, ancient meaning, when it was the magical, incantatory expression of the religious beliefs of human groups." Mana, even as one of his first mature works, is a reflection of this; Jolivet considered the sculptures as fetish objects. His later writing continued to seek the original meanings of music and its capacity for emotional, ritual, and celebratory expression.

In 1945 he published a paper declaring that "true French music owes nothing to Stravinsky", though both composers drew heavily upon themes of ancient music in their work; Jolivet and La jeune France rejected neoclassicism in favor of a less mechanical and progressive and instead a more spiritual style of composition. Later, during World War II, Jolivet shifted away from atonality and toward a more tonal and lyrical style of composition. After a few years of working in this more simplistic style, during which time he wrote the comic opera Dolorès, ou Le miracle de la femme laide (1942) and the ballet Guignol et Pandore (1943), he arrived at a compromise between this and his earlier more experimental work. The First Piano Sonata, written in 1945, shows elements of both these styles.

Finally realizing his youthful ambition to write for the theater, Jolivet became the musical director of the Comédie Française in 1945, a post he held until 1959. While there he composed for plays by Molière, Racine, Sophocles, Shakespeare, and Claudel, scoring 14 works in total. He also continued to compose for the concert hall, often inspired by his frequent travels around the world, adapting texts and music from Egypt, the Middle East, Africa, and Asia into his distinctly French style.

During the 1950s and 1960s, Jolivet wrote several concertos for a variety of instruments including trumpet, piano, flute, harp, bassoon, percussion, cello, and violin. These works, while highly regarded, all demand virtuosic technical skill from the performers. Jolivet is also one of the few composers to write for the ondes Martenot, an early electronic instrument, completing a concerto for it in 1947, 19 years after the instrument's invention. Jolivet founded the Centre Français d'Humanisme Musical at Aix-en-Provence in 1959, and in 1961 went to teach composition at the Paris Conservatoire.

Recordings of Jolivet's music appears on the labels Stradivarius, Erato, Naxos, and BIS.

== Selected works ==
=== Chamber and solo music ===
- 12 Inventions, for wind quintet, trumpet, trombone, and string quintet (1966)
- Adagio, for strings (1960)
- Andante, for string orchestra (1934)
- Cérémonial, homage to Varèse for six percussion instruments (1968)
- Chant de Linos, for flute, violin, viola, cello, and harp (1944)
- Chant d'oppression, for viola and piano (1935)
- Cinq danses rituelles (1939)
- Cinq églogues, for viola solo (1967)
- Cinq incantations, for flute (1936)
- Cosmogonie, for piano (1938)
- Deux études de concert, for guitar (1965)
- Fantaisie-Impromptu, for saxophone and piano (1953)
- Hymne à l'univers, for organ (1961)
- Mana, six pieces for piano (1935)
- Mandala, organ (1969)
- Pastorales de Noël, for flute, bassoon, and harp (1943)
- Rhapsodie à sept, for seven winds and strings (1957)
- Sérénade, for two guitars (1956) (dedicated to the duo of Ida Presti and Alexandre Lagoya)
- Sérénade, for wind quintet with principal oboe (1945)
- Sonata, for flute (1958)
- Sonatine, for flute and piano (1961)
- Sonatine, for flute and clarinet (1961)
- Sonatine, for oboe and bassoon (1963)
- String Quartet (1934)
- Suite delphique, for 12 instruments (1943)
- Suite en concert, for flute and four percussion instruments (1965)
- Suite en concert, for cello (1965)
- Tombeau de Robert de Visée, for guitar (1972)

=== Keyboard ===
- Cinq danses rituelles, for piano (1939)
- Cosmogonie, for piano (1938)
- Hymne à l'univers, for organ (1961)
- Mana, six pieces for piano (1935)
- Mandala, for organ (1969)
- Six Etudes, for piano (1931)
- Sonata, for piano (1945)
- Sonata, for piano (1957)
- Trois Temps No. 1, for piano (1931)
- Trois Temps No. 2, for piano (1931)

=== Concertos ===
- Concerto for ondes Martenot and orchestra (1947)
- Concertino for trumpet, piano, and string orchestra (1948)
- Concerto for flute and strings (1949)
- Concerto for piano (1951)
- Concerto for harp and chamber orchestra (1952)
- Concerto for bassoon, strings, harp, and piano (1954)
- Concerto for trumpet (1954)
- Concerto for percussion (1958)
- Concerto for cello number 1 (1962)
- Concerto for flute and percussion (1965)
- Concerto for cello number 2 (1966)
- Concerto for violin (1972)

=== Orchestral music ===
- 3 Symphonies (1953, 1959, 1964)
- Cinq danses rituelles (orchestral version, 1941)
- Cosmogonie (orchestral version, 1938)
- Danse incantatoire (1936)
- Suite delphique, for strings, harp, ondes Martenot, and percussion (1943)
- Symphony for strings (1961)

=== Vocal music ===
==== Songs ====
- Les trois complaintes du soldat, for voice and orchestra (1940)
- Poèmes pour l'enfant, for voice and eleven instruments (1937)
- Songe à nouveau rêvé, concerto for soprano and orchestra
- Suite liturgique pour voice, oboe, cello, and harp (1942)
- Épithalame, for 12-part choir (1953)
- Poèmes intimes, for soprano and chamber orchestra

==== Sacred music ====
- La vérité de Jeanne, oratorio (1956)
- Mass Uxor tua (1962)
- Messe pour le jour de la paix (1940)

=== Ballets ===
- Ariadne (1964)
- Ballet des étoiles (1941)
- Guignol et Pandore (1943)
- L'inconnue (1950)
- Les quatre vérités (1940)
- Marines

=== Operas ===
- Antigone (1951)
- Bogomil (unfinished)
- Dolorès ou Le miracle de la femme laide (1942)
