= Xyrion Trio =

The Xyrion Trio is a German classical piano trio.

== Biography and career ==
The Xyrion Trio was founded in 2001, and includes Nina Tichman, piano, Ida Bieler, violin, and Maria Kliegel, cello. The trio has performed in many major cities, and has also performed in international festivals, including the Beethovenfest Bonn, Ludwigsburger Schloßkonzerte, Rheinische Musikfest. The Xyrion Trio has performed throughout Germany, Switzerland, Spain and France, and in 2007, assumed the artistic directorship of the Andernacher Musiktage which takes place every year in May.

The Xyrion Trio has recorded several CDs, including a series of Beethoven's complete piano trios, for the Naxos label, to include a total of five volumes.
