= Zsuzsanna Sirokay =

Hungarian pianist

Zsuzsanna Sirokay (Hungarian: [ˈʒuʒɒnnɒ ˈʃirokɒi]; born 28 March 1941 in Ungvár, Carpathian Ruthenia, Hungary) is a Hungarian pianist and lives in Switzerland. She passed her education with Professor Péter Solymos at the Franz Liszt College of Music in Budapest with distinction. Besides studies with György Kurtág she attended master courses with Alfred Brendel, Paul Badura-Skoda, Jörg Demus and Géza Anda.

Sirokay was a finalist at the Clara Haskil International Piano Competition in Vevey, Switzerland in 1967 and 1969, and won competitions held in Leeds and Vienna. She has undertaken concert tours and broadcast on radio throughout much of Europe

The second of Cornelius Cardew's Three Winter Potatoes for solo piano is dedicated to her.

== Recordings ==
- W. A. Mozart, Klavierkonzert A-Dur KV 488 and C-Dur KV 415, Hungaroton
- Béla Bartók, Klavierwerke (4 Klagelieder, Allegro barbaro, Suite op. 14 and others), Jecklin

Chamber music:

- «Romantische Klarinettenmusik»: Norbert Burgmüller, Niels Wilhelm Gade, Charles Villiers Stanford (with Lux Brahn), Jecklin
- «Musik aus der Blütezeit des Bassethorns»: Franz Danzi, Alois Beerhalter (with Hans Rudolf Stalder), Jecklin
- «The Virtuoso Flute»: F. Kuhlau, F. Ries, C. Czerny, Bernhard Molique (with Peter-Lukas Graf), Jecklin
- «Virtuose Klarinettenmusik der Romantik II»: Boieldieu, Cavallini, Ponchielli, Rossini and others (with Hans Rudolf Stalder and Heinz Hofer), Jecklin
- Johannes Brahms, Sonatas Op. 120 F-Moll and Es-Dur (with András Tószeghi), Angelicum
- Friedrich Kuhlau, 2 Sonatas A-Moll Op. 85 and Es-Moll Op. 64 (with Peter-Lucas Graf), Claves
