= Delphine Bardin =

French classical pianist (born 1974)

Delphine Bardin (born 18 July 1974) is a French classical pianist.

== Biography ==
Born in Tours, Delphine Bardin began playing the piano at the age of five. She then studied with Paule Grimaldi and entered the Conservatoire de Paris, where she won first prizes in piano, chamber music, piano accompaniment and vocal accompaniment.

She was then admitted to the advanced cycle, in the class of Pierre-Laurent Aimard for piano and Christian Ivaldi for chamber music.

In 1996, she was awarded the Yvonne Lefébure Fellowship and the following year was awarded the Clara Haskil International Piano Competition (Vevey, in Switzerland).

Numerous solo engagements followed in Switzerland, Canada, Germany and France; winner of the "Natexis Foundation", she was also named "Rising Star" for the 2001/2002 season, which allowed her to perform in prestigious concert halls such as the Cologne Philharmonic, the Wigmore Hall of London and the Centre for Fine Arts, Brussels.

She has performed in festivals such as the Klavier-Festival Ruhr, the Mozart-Messiaen Days in Vevey, the Festival des Arcs.

Chamber music holds a very important place in her activity and she plays regularly with cellist Ophélie Gaillard, and flautist Sarah Louvion. Together with cellist Maryse Castello and violinist Arno Madoni, she formed the Pilgrim Trio. In duet with violinist Elsa Grether, she was awarded the Pro Musicis Prize.

== Selected discography ==
- CD Mozart / Schumann avec l’Orchestre de Chambre de Lausanne sous la direction de Jesus Lopez-Cobos (Claves 1998)
- Album Airs chantés, with Canadian soprano Hélène Guilmette (Ambroisie 2004)
- Fauré's Barcarolles (Diapason d'Or 2010) (Alpha 2010).
