= Pastorales de Noël =

Composition by André Jolivet

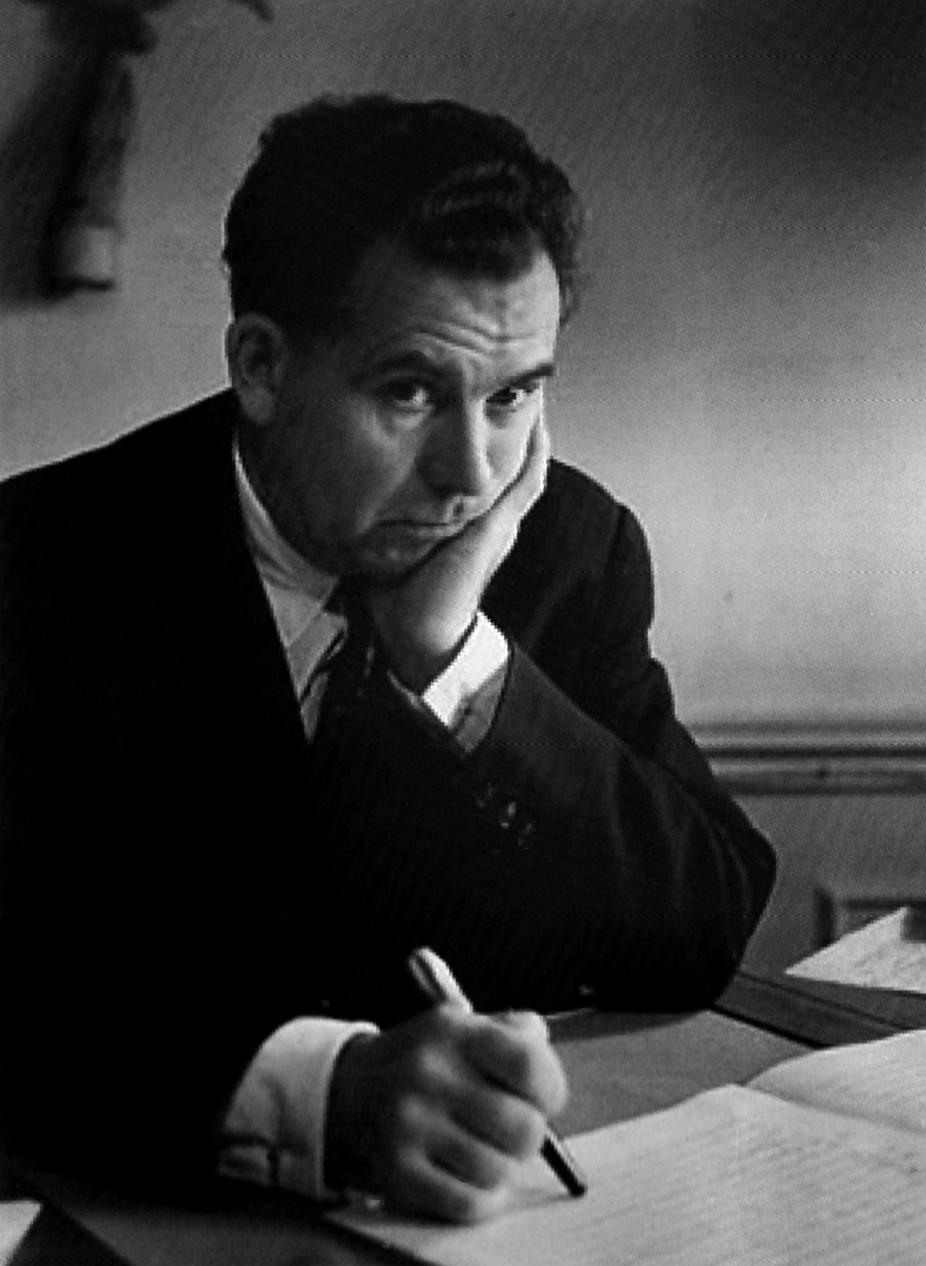
André Jolivet in 1930

Pastorales de Noël (Christmas Pastoral) is a trio composition for flute, bassoon and harp written by André Jolivet in 1943. It is cast in four movements and lasts about 12 minutes.

It has been described as an "unusual and very lovely Christmas piece".

== Overview ==
The work, for the most part gentle and evocative, establishes a mood of antiquity. The four scenes are vividly characterized and the instruments are used to great effect.

There are four movements:

1. L'Étoile
2. Les Mages
3. La Vierge et l'enfant
4. Entrée et danse des bergers

The opening movement, "L'Étoile (The Star) begins with a mysterious duet for flute and bassoon and features sparkling harp arpeggios. In "Les Mages", the bassoon and the flute echo the Magis' efforts during their journey, with a melody that displays a characteristic augmented interval (E♭ to F♯). The goal of their pilgrimage is the subject of the next movement, "La Vierge et l'enfant". It is extremely simple, based entirely on the C minor scale. The harmony consists only of three chords: C minor, F minor and G minor and calls to mind a peaceful lullaby. The final movement, "Entrée et danse des bergers" (Entrance and Dance of the Shepherds) is more rhythmically complex and changes metre several times. It ends unexpectedly on an E major chord with added sixth.

== Selected discography ==
- Castagner, Faisandier, Laskine, 2005, Recorded in 1956, Accord 2CD 4767783.
- Trio Nordmann, 1972, Erato STU-70-706.
- The Britten–Pears Ensemble, 1995, ASV CD DCA-918.
- Manuela Wiesler, Christian Davidsson, Erica Goodman, 1996, Bis Records CD 739.
- Ensemble Arpeggio, 2004, ASV QS 6252.
