= Volker Schmidt-Gertenbach =

German music conductor (1941–2026)

Volker Schmidt-Gertenbach (28 December 1941 – 25 July 2026) was a German musician and conductor. From 1974 to 1989, he was music director and general music director of the Göttinger Symphonie Orchester.

== Life and career ==
Schmidt-Gertenbach was born the son of a cantor, in Witzenhausen, on 28 December 1941. He received his first violin and piano lessons at the age of 6. After graduating from high school, he began to study music and mathematics. He gained his first orchestral experience with a student orchestra he founded in Göttingen. Intensive studies with Rudolf Kempe and Wolfgang Sawallisch followed. At the end of the 1960s he led the orchestra of the StMV Blaue Sänger Göttingen.

In 1965, the Staatstheater Kassel engaged him as Repetitor.

Schmidt-Gertenbach had a decisive influence on the Göttinger Symphonie Orchester for 21 years. First from 1968 to 1974 as deputy music director, then from 1974 to 1989 as chief conductor and generalmusicdirector (GMD).

He regularly performed with artists such as Wilhelm Kempff, Claudio Arrau, Alfred Brendel, Martha Argerich, Géza Anda, Mstislav Rostropovich, Heinrich Schiff and Frank Peter Zimmermann.

From 1981 to 1984, Schmidt-Gertenbach was also permanent conductor of the Radio Symphony Orchestra in Stavanger (Norway).

Schmidt-Gertenbach completed extensive concert tours through the Federal Republic, Italy, the US, Spain and Japan with the world-renowned orchestras Sinfonia Varsovia, AUKSO chamber orchestra and Cappella Istropolitana.

He performed in Vienna, Berlin, Rome, Chicago and Washington as well as at the Schleswig-Holstein Music Festival, the Eastern Music Festival (US), the summer festival of Menton in France, the Rheingau Musik Festival, the Walkenrieder Kreuzgangkonzerte and at the Festspiele Mecklenburg-Vorpommern.

As a guest conductor, Schmidt-Gertenbach travelled to France, Great Britain, Ireland, Denmark, Norway, Spain, Italy, Switzerland, Austria, the Netherlands, Belgium, Hungary, Romania, Slovakia, the Czech Republic, Poland, Russia, Egypt, Israel, Korea, Japan, South Africa, Mexico and the USA.

Schmidt-Gertenbach recorded over 100 works for various broadcasters, appeared on television several times and also made a name for himself in the music industry.

In 1998, 2001 and 2002 Schmidt-Gertenbach was conductor of the German-Polish Choral Academy "in terra pax".

Schmidt-Gertenbach lived in Sommerhausen during his final years. He died on 25 July 2026, at the age of 84.

== Recordings (selection) ==
- Henry Litolff: Konzert-Sinfonien, Kl Orch op. 45 Concerto symphonique Nr. 3 Es-Dur "National hollandais" (Fono-Schallplattengesellschaft, 1979)
- Franz Liszt: Totentanz (Fono-Schallplattengesellschaft, 1980)
- Wolfgang Amadeus Mozart: Sinfonie D-dur KV 84 (Aperto-Schallplatten, 1983)
- Wolfgang Amadeus Mozart: Sinfonie A-dur KV 201 (Aperto-Schallplatten, 1984)
- Wolfgang Amadeus Mozart: Sinfonie D-dur KV 385 (Aperto-Schallplatten, 1985)
- Wolfgang Amadeus Mozart: Sinfonie A-dur KV 201 (Aperto-Schallplatten, 1985)
- Joseph Haydn: Cellokonzerte (Aperto-Schallplatten, 1985)
- Wolfgang Amadeus Mozart: Klavierkonzerte (Aperto-Schallplatten, 1987)
- Gustav Holst: St. Paul's suite (Aperto-Schallplatten, 1988)
- Musik auf Villa Hügel – Live (Essen / Krupp, 1991)
- Alexandra von der Weth: Konzertarien von Mozart und Beethoven (Fono-Schallplattengesellschaft, 1994)
- Wolfgang Amadeus Mozart: Symphonie Nr. 41 C-Dur KV 551 (Aperto-Schallplatten, 1995)
- Robert Schumann: Symphonie Nr. 1 B-Dur op. 38 (Aperto-Schallplatten, 1995)
- Felix Mendelssohn Bartholdy: Sinfonien (Line Music, 1995)
- Joseph Haydn: Sinfonie Nr. 44 e-Moll (Aperto-Schallplatten, 1995)
- Franz Schubert: Symphonies nos. 5, 6 (BMG Ariola, 1997)
- Joseph Haydn: Piano concertos Hob. XVIII, 3, 4, 11 (BMG Ariola, 1997)
- Ludwig van Beethoven: Violin concerto in D major op. 61 (BMG Ariola, 1998)
- Felix Mendelssohn Bartholdy: Die Streicher-Sinfonien (Line Music, 1998)
- World of baroque – Vol. 1 (EMI-Electrola, 1999)
- Frédéric Chopin: Piano concerto no. 1 in E minor (BMG Ariola, 1999)
- Frédéric Chopin: Meisterwerke (BMG Ariola, 1999)
- World of baroque – Vol. 2 (EMI-Electrola, 2000)
- Felix Mendelssohn Bartholdy: Gesamtausgabe der Streichersinfonien (Line Music, 2000)
- Frédéric Chopin: Klavierkonzerte Nr. 1 & 2 (BMG Ariola, 2003)
- Musikbad Pyrmont – Promenade (Christian Feldgen, 2006)
