= Dinorah Varsi =

Uruguayan pianist and composer

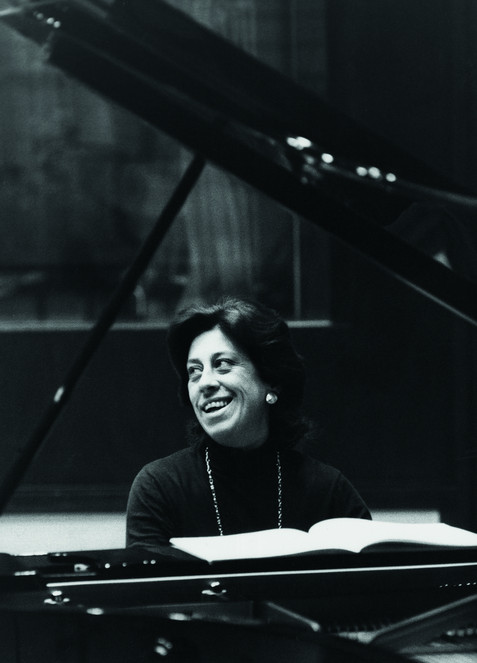
- Born: 15 November 1939; Montevideo, Uruguay
- Died: 17 June 2013 (aged 73); Berlin, Germany
- Musical career
- Occupation: Musician
- Instrument: Piano

Dinorah Varsi (15 November 1939 - 17 June 2013) was a Uruguayan classical pianist.

== Early life ==
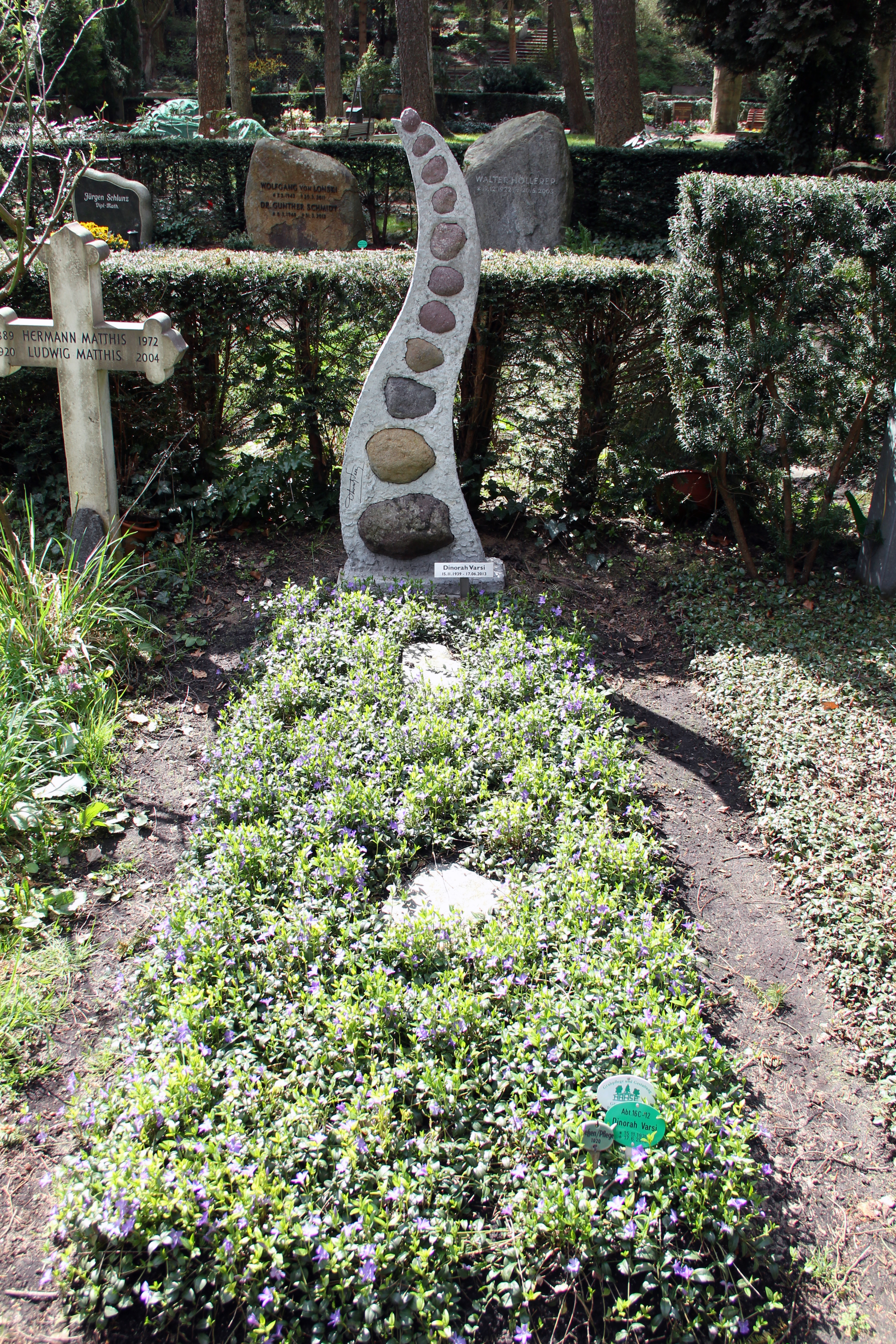
Grave, Friedhof Heerstraße, in Berlin, Germany

Varsi was born in Montevideo, Uruguay. She started playing the piano at the age of three and studied with Sarah Bourdillon de Santorsola, at Montevideo's Escuela Normal de Música. At the age of eight Varsi played Bach's F minor Keyboard Concerto in Uruguay and Brazil, and in 1949 she made her debut with the OSSODRE (Uruguay's National Radio Symphony Orchestra), playing the same concerto under Vicente Ascone. In 1952, Varsi played her first recital at the Centro Cultural de Música. In 1955, she performed Rachmaninov's Second Piano Concerto with Victor Tevah and the OSSODRE. In 1960 she appeared with the same orchestra, playing Beethoven's G major Concerto with Enrique Jordá. In Buenos Aires in 1959 she took first prize in the George Lalewicz competition, followed by first prizes in the Maria Canals International Music Competition in Barcelona in 1962 and the Concours Clara Haskil in 1967, in Lucerne.

In 1961 Varsi made her debut in the United States when Dallas Symphony Music Director Paul Kletzki invited Varsi to perform as a soloist with his orchestra. She continued her studies in Paris, New York and Switzerland, and after her triumph in the Clara Haskil International Piano Competition in 1967, her international performing and recording career was launched. She performed extensively with major European symphony orchestras and major music festivals, taught master classes, and was a juror at the international competitions. Although the core of her repertoire concentrated on the great Romantic composers, she also played Mozart and contemporary composers such as Galina Ustvolskaya.

== Middle years ==
After leaving Uruguay, Dinorah Varsi studied in New York with American pianist Leonard Shure. In the early sixties she settled in Paris and later in Switzerland where she studied with Hungarian pianist Géza Anda. She won the Haskil Competition, and performed in concerts in Salzburg, Berlin, Prague and Zurich. She appeared in festivals, including as Salzburg, Lucerne, Schleswig-Holstein and Munich. Among her orchestra appearances, she was a soloist with the Berliner Philharmoniker under Semyon Bychkov, the Royal Concertgebouw Orchestra of Amsterdam under Bernard Haitink, the Royal Philharmonic in London, the Munich Philharmonic and the Rotterdam Philharmonic. Some of the conductors she collaborated with were Giuseppe Sinopoli, Charles Dutoit, Rudolf Kempe and Witold Rowicki. A tour through Southern Africa was completed in 1972 to critical acclaim.

Dinorah Varsi died in Berlin, Germany, on June 17, 2013.

== Discography ==
Varsi's recordings include performances of Schumann (Kreisleriana and Kinderszenen), Chopin (the three piano sonatas, complete Mazurkas, 24 Etudes, 24 Preludes, Fantasy in F minor, Impromptus and complete Nocturnes), Brahms (both concertos, Rhapsodies Op.79, piano pieces Op. 76, 116, 117, 118 and 119), Franck (Prelude, Chorale and Fugue), Debussy (Préludes, Book I) and Galina Ustvolskaya (Sonata Nº4), for Phillips, EMI, Mediaphon, Deutsche Harmonia Mundi and Saphir.

She also collaborated on record with violinist Arthur Grumiaux in works for violin and piano.
