= Mao Fujita =

Japanese pianist

- 藤田真央
- Born: 28 November 1998 (age 27); Tokyo, Japan
- Education: Tokyo College of Music High School; Tokyo College of Music; Hochschule für Musik Hanns Eisler Berlin, Konzertexamen (since April 2024)
- Occupation: Pianist
- Awards: Rosario Marciano International Piano Competition, Clara Haskil International Piano Competition
- Website: maofujita.com

Mao Fujita (Japanese: 藤田真央; born 28 November 1998) is a Japanese pianist.

== Life ==
Mao Fujita was born 28 November 1998 in Tokyo and began learning piano at age three. He studied piano with Ms. Yuka Matsuyama and Prof. Gen Matsuyama from age 9 until at least 2016. He is a graduate of Tokyo College of Music High School. As of 2019 he is studying as a special scholarship student in the Piano Performance for Talented Students Division at the Tokyo College of Music.

His first appearance on the major international competitions was in 2010, where he received the 1st prize in the Junior Section of The World Classic in Taiwan. He won several piano competitions over the following years, including the Rosario Marciano International Piano Competition in Vienna in 2013 and the 27th Clara Haskil International Piano Competition in Switzerland in 2017.

He participated in the Gina Bachauer International Young Artists Piano Competition in 2016 and won 3rd prize.

Fujita won the Second Prize and Silver Medal at the XVI International Tchaikovsky Competition piano category in 2019.

== Discography ==
- Beethoven - Rachmaninov - Miyoshi (Mao Fujita) Naxos Crescendo NYCC-10001, 2013
- Beethoven: Piano Sonata No. 14 - Wagner/Liszt: Tannhauser Overture - Prokofiev Piano Sonata (Mao Fujita) Naxos Japan NYCC-27296, 2015
- Passage (Mao Fujita) Naxos Japan NYCC-27306, 2018
- Paderewski: Piano Masterpieces (Yukio Yokoyama, Mao Fujita, Yukine Kuroki) Naxos Japan NYCC-27307, 2018
- Listen to the Universe – Mao Fujita with Masahiko Enkoji, 2019
- Chopin: Impromptus & Scherzos (Mao Fujita) Naxos Japan, 2020
- Mozart: The Complete Piano Sonatas (Mao Fujita) Sony Classical G010004812009Z, 2022
