= Hartmut Höll =

German pianist and music professor (born 1952)

Hartmut Höll (born November 24, 1952) is a German pianist and music professor.

== Biography ==
Höll was born in Heilbronn. He trained in Stuttgart, Milan and Munich, specializing in art song accompaniment. From the time of his début in 1973 he has worked closely with the soprano (later mezzo-soprano) Mitsuko Shirai, winning the Hugo Wolf Competition in Vienna, the Robert Schumann Competition at Zwickau (1974) and international prizes in 1976 in Athens and 's-Hertogenbosch. For many years their recitals have been acclaimed throughout Europe and the United States, as well as in Japan, the Middle East and South America. They have also recorded extensively together.

Höll was also frequent accompanist to Dietrich Fischer-Dieskau, from 1982 until the singer's retirement in 1993. Their recording of Beethoven's songs won special praise for Höll's finely shaded playing. Another close associate has been the viola player Tabea Zimmermann, and they too have made some remarkable recordings, including sonatas by Brahms and Shostakovich,.

Since 2001 he has accompanied Renée Fleming for recitals in Europe, Australia, Asia and the United States. He has also worked with other singers, such as Urszula Kryger, Yvonne Naef, Jochen Kowalski, René Pape, Christoph Prégardien, Hermann Prey, Jadwiga Rappé, Peter Schreier, Changyong Liao, and Roman Trekel, and the clarinettist Sabine Meyer.

== Teaching ==
Höll is professor at the Hochschule für Musik Karlsruhe and a visiting professor in Salzburg and Helsinki. He also serves as artistic director of the International Hugo Wolf Academy in Stuttgart.

== Writing ==
- WortMusik, Staccato, Düsseldorf 2012 ISBN 978-3-932976-44-5

== Selected discography ==
- Schoeck: Lieder (1986) Claves Records
- Mozart: 21 Songs (with Mitsuko Shirai) (1986) Capriccio Records
- Mendelssohn: Lieder (with Dietrich Fischer-Dieskau) (1991) Claves Records
- Schoeck: Das Hold Bescheiden (1993) Claves Records
- Weber: Lieder (1993) Claves Records
- Ravel: Songs (with Dietrich Fischer-Dieskau) (1993) Orfeo Records
- Schoeck: Das stille Leuchten (1994) Claves Records
- Richard Strauss: Songs (with Mitsuko Shirai) (1994) Cappricio Records
- Lieder (Songs) with Viola (1995) Capriccio Records
- Schubert Edition: Die Schőne Műllerin; Winterreise (1997) Capriccio Records
- Schumann: Frauenliebe und –Leben Op. 42; Liederkreis Op. 39 (1997) Camerata Records
- Norbert Burgmũller: Chamber Music (2000) MDG Records
- Victor Ullman: Lieder (2001) Capriccio Records
- Brahms: Viola Sonatas; Schumann: Märchenbilder (2003) EMI Classics
- Schumann: Sonata Op. 105, Märchenbilder, Romanzen, Fantasiestűcke, Adagio and Allegro (2004) Capriccio Records
- Schubert: Lieder (2004) Apex Records
- Ludwig Thulle: Selected Songs (2012) Capriccio Records
- German Duets: Mendelssohn, Schumann, Brahms (2014) Dux Records
