= Chant de Linos =

1944 musical composition by André Jolivet

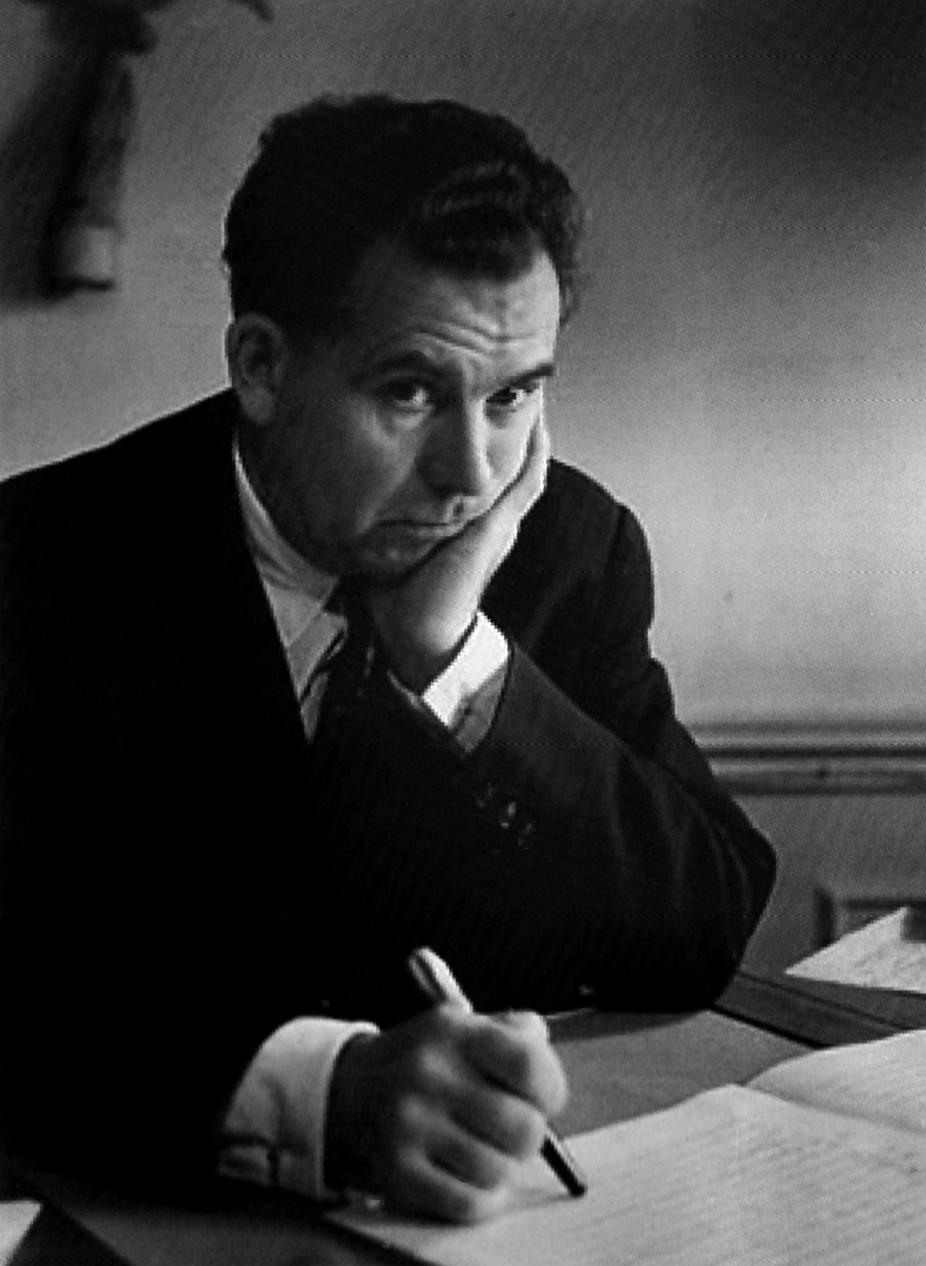
André Jolivet in 1930

Chant de Linos is a work for flute and piano written by French composer André Jolivet in 1944 as a commission for a Conservatoire de Paris competition which was subsequently won by Jean-Pierre Rampal. He transcribed it for flute, violin, viola, cello and harp the same year. The piece has since become a staple of the modern flute repertoire.

Both versions last about 10 minutes.

== Overview ==
Jolivet's musical ambition was to

give back to music its ancient and original character as the magic and incantational expression of human groups. Music should be a sonorous manifestation directly related to the universal cosmic system.

Ancient myths from around the world were one of his sources of inspiration. Thus, Chant de Linos is based on the mythological musician Linus, who taught music to Orpheus and Heracles. Jolivet described the work as an ancient Greek mourning chant consisting of laments interspersed with cries and dances. In the work, the laments are usually in 5/4 while a strongly accented ostinato in 7/8 sets the dance sections apart.

The piece is based on an archaic-sounding modal scale (G, A♭, B, C♯, D and F). Although it is in one movement, it consists of several parts. After the improvisatory introduction, there are four main sections with variations, differing meters and tempos. They can be sketched as follows

- Section A – slow in 5/4
- Section B – moderate in 3/4
- Section C – fast in 7/8
- Section D – moderate in 7/8

The overall structure is AB A′B′ CD A″B″ C′.

The work displays a wide range of techniques including flutter-tonguing, extreme dynamic changes, and irregular phrases.

== Recordings ==
Piano version

- Robert Aitken (flute), 1988, Bis Records – 184.
- Emmanuel Pahud (flute), 1997, EMI Classics – 7243-5-56488-2-2.
- Juliette Hurel (flute), 2002, Naïve Records – V4925.
- Patrick Gallois (flute), 2005, Naxos Records – 8557328.
- Sharon Bezaly (flute), 2006, Masterworks For Flute And Piano, Bis Records – 1429.
- Denis Bouriakov (flute), 2012, Prokofiev, Copland, Debussy, Nami 4988071010196.

Ensemble version

- Philippe Racine (flute), 1990, Claves Records – 50-9003.
- Manuela Wiesler (flute), 1996, André Jolivet – Complete Flute Music, Volume 2, Bis Records – 739.
- Pierre-André Valade (flute), 2003, Jolivet, L'oeuvre pour Flûte, Recorded in 1993, Accord Records – 4722982.
- Eline van Esch (flute), 2005, André Jolivet, Incantations, Etcetera Records – KTC1322.
- Sarah Louvion (flute), 2008, Farao Classics – B108032.
