= François-Xavier Poizat =

- Born: August 18, 1989 (age 36); Grenoble, France
- Occupation: Pianist
- Website: www.fxpoizat.com

François-Xavier Poizat is a pianist with French, Swiss and Chinese origins. He is the founder of the Puplinge Classique music festival.
