= Pierre-Philippe Bauzin =

French organist, improviser and composer

Pierre-Philippe Bauzin (12 April 1933 – 11 January 2005) was a French organist, improviser and composer.

== Biography ==
Born in Saint-Émilion, Bauzin began studying the piano at the age of five, the organ at ten and harmony at eleven. At twelve years old, he became, by competition, titular of the great organ of the Saint-Pierre church of Bordeaux. At the age of fourteen, he obtained his First prize for piano and his First prize for harmony at the conservatoire de Bordeaux. Three months later, he was admitted to piano and harmony classes at the Conservatoire de Paris, where he won several prizes. At sixteen, he was titular organist at the Notre Dame de Lourdes church in Chaville and officially conducted his first choir.

His masters were:

- Yves Nat and Jean Batalla (piano)
- Maurice Duruflé (harmony and pipe organ)
- Noël Gallon (counterpoint and fugue)
- Élisabeth Brasseur (Choir direction)
- Louis Fourestier (Conducting)
- Olivier Messiaen (musical analysis)
- Arthur Honegger (musical composition)

It was mainly as an organist that he travelled the world. He was a lifetime guest organist in the St. Peter's Basilica of the Vatican in Rome, where he received several times the congratulations of Pope John Paul II. In the 1990s, he gave improvisation master classes on the organ at the Juilliard School of New York. Thus, through his exceptional qualities as an improviser, he gave numerous organ recitals throughout Europe and the United States.

Bauzin died 11 January 2005 in Nice at age 71 and was buried at Ambarès in his native region.
