= Greta Hofer (opera singer) =

German opera singer

Greta Hofer, née Greta Köhler, pseudonym Greta Colere (28 December 1900 – 7 May 1995) was a German opera singer.

== Life ==
Hofer was born in Hanover then part of the Deutsches Kaiserreich. After the First World War, from 1919 to 1923, she registered at the Hochschule für Musik, Theater und Medien Hannoversinging lessons.

She then had her first engagement in Dortmund. Since 1927, she has been performing in England with the pseudonyme Greta Colere under the conductors Thomas Beecham, Adrian Boult and Malcolm Sargent.

During the Nazi era, Köhler married the tenor Laurenz Hofer (28 April 1888 in Cologne – 29 November 1964) and moved with him to Berlin.

At the end of the Second World War, she returned with her husband to the city that was 48% destroyed by the bombing of Hanover in World War II and opened a singing studio with him, which she continued alone as a widow from 1964.

Graduates of her classes included the singers Josef Metternich, Rudolf Schock and Gotthard Kronstein.

Hofer died in Hanover at the age of 94.

== Recordings ==
The German National Library lists (as of April 2012) six record titles that document Greta Hofer's singing, including

- War's auch nur ein Traum. Lied aus der Operetta Monika, music: Nico Dostal, text: Hernecke, Gesang: Greta Hofer, Theo Reuter and his Orchestra, Clangor-Schallplatten G.m.b.H. Berlin, Schallplatten-Volksverband M 1810 (Seite 2 von 2)
