= Hildegard Uhrmacher =

German soprano (born 1939)

- Born: 15 December 1939 (age 85); Mönchengladbach, Germany
- Other names: Hildegard Kronstein-Uhrmacher
- Occupations: Operatic soprano; Academic teacher
- Organizations: Hamburg State Opera; Musikhochschule Hannover; Hochschule für Musik Detmold
- Spouse: Gotthard Kronstein

Hildegard Uhrmacher (born 15 December 1939), married name Hildegard Kronstein-Uhrmacher, is a German operatic soprano who appeared at European opera houses in coloratura soprano roles such as Mozart's Konstanze, but also in contemporary works including Marie in Bernd Alois Zimmermann's Die Soldaten. She was a professor of voice at the Musikhochschule Hannover and the Hochschule für Musik Detmold. Her 2006 autobiography is entitled Hilde, du schaffst das.

== Life ==
Uhrmacher was born in Mönchengladbach. She worked as a teacher for three years in Waldniel. At the same time, she studied voice with Clemens Clettenberg, Peter Witsch and in the opera studio of the Deutsche Oper am Rhein. There, she made her debut in 1964 as Vespina in Haydn's L'infedeltà delusa.

From 1965 to 1967, she was a member of the ensemble of the Deutsche Oper am Rhein. From 1967 to 1973, she had an engagement at the Staatstheater Kassel. In 1974, she became first coloratura soprano of the Hamburg State Opera, where she remained until 1984. She appeared as a guest at the Bavarian State Opera, Cologne Opera, Opernhaus Dortmund, Staatstheater Nürnberg, Oper Frankfurt, in Karlsruhe, and internationally at the Vienna State Opera, Dutch National Opera in Amsterdam, Maggio Musicale Fiorentino and Welsh Opera in Cardiff.

In 1980, she appeared in the festival at Schloss Weikersheim in the title role of Salomé by Richard Strauss. From 1981 to 1988, she had a guest contract with the Stuttgart State Opera and from 1981 to 1989 with the Bavarian State Opera. At the Staatsoper Hannover, she appeared as Marie in Bernd Alois Zimmermann's Die Soldaten in 1989 and as Felice in Wolf-Ferarris I quatro rusteghi in 1991; she performed the title role of Hanna Glawari in Lehar's Die lustige Witwe at the Deutsche Oper am Rhein in 1995.

Her roles included Mozart characters such as the Queen of the Night in Die Zauberflöte, Konstanze in Die Entführung aus dem Serail, and Despina in Così fan tutte, also the Baroness in Lortzing's Der Wildschütz and Gilda in Verdi's Rigoletto.

Since the mid-1980s, she has been a professor at the Musikhochschule Hannover, and later at the Hochschule für Musik Detmold. From 1982 Uhrmacher was married to the baritone Gotthard Kronstein until his death in 1997, also performing under the name Hildegard Kronstein-Uhrmacher. She has held master classes at the Internationale Musikakademie für Solisten (IMAS). She published her autobiography Hilde, du schaffst das (Hilde, you'll manage) in 2006.
