= Jochum =

Jochum is a masculine given name and a surname. Notable people with the name include:

== Given name ==
- Jochum Brinch Lund (1743–1807), Norwegian merchant, shipowner and industrial pioneer
- Jochum de Lange, Norwegian rebel, farmer and sailor
- Jochum Nicolay Müller (1775–1848), Norwegian naval officer
- Jochum Johansen (1823–1913), Norwegian civil servant
- Jochum ten Haaf (born 1978), Dutch actor

== Surname ==
- Betsy Jochum (1921–2025), American baseball player
- Charles Jochums (born 1957), Belgian racing cyclist
- Eugen Jochum (1902–1987), German conductor, brother of Georg and Otto
- Georg Ludwig Jochum (1909–1970), German conductor
- Michael Jochum, American rock drummer
- Otto Jochum (1898–1969), German composer, choral director and music educator
- Pam Jochum (born 1954), American politician and President of the Iowa Senate
- Thomas J. Jochum (1951–2020), American politician from Iowa

== Other ==
- JOCHUM, a group of characters created by the Japanese company, Sanrio.
