= Emilio Colón =

Emilio Colón (born 1967) is an American solo cellist, chamber musician, conductor, composer and pedagogue. He was born in Puerto Rico. He is an international artist, concertizing in Canada, Costa Rica, Colombia, Ecuador, France, Italy, Germany, Guatemala, Hungary, Japan, Korea, Malta, the Netherlands, Puerto Rico, Spain, Switzerland, and the United States.

Colón is married to fellow musician and cellist Cara Elise Colón, and together they founded the International Chamber Orchestra of Puerto Rico (ICOPR).

== Education ==
Colón received a bachelor's degree from the Puerto Rico Conservatory of Music in 1986 as a student of Joaquín Vidaechea, where he won the Pablo Casals Medal upon graduation. As a student and teaching assistant to the distinguished cellist and pedagogue Janos Starker, Colón earned a master's degree from the Indiana University Jacobs School of Music in 1989. He won first prize at the Las Americas Festival Solo Competition. Colón plays on an Amati Cello from 1690 and a Dominique Peccatte bow.

The given name of Emilio Colón is Emilio W. Colón.

== Career ==
Colón's cello playing has been described in prose as "full of life and warmth" by the American Record Guide, who also praised his performance as "lively, exciting, expressive and absolutely beautiful." Fanfare Magazine wrote of the cellist, "Emilio Colón is obviously a virtuoso with taste." In 2017, he was awarded the "Artist of the Year" by the New York Classical Music Society.

Performing throughout the world, Emilio has been invited as soloist with the Reno Chamber Orchestra, Casals Festival, National Symphony of the Ukraine, Istanbul State Symphony Orchestra, İzmir State Symphony Orchestra, Antalya Symphony Orchestra, International Symphony Orchestra of Lviv, Guayaquil Symphony Orchestra, Puerto Rico Symphony Orchestra, Guayaquil Philharmonic Orchestra, Huntsville Symphony Orchestra, Classical Orchestra of Guatemala, Bozeman Symphony and San Angelo Symphony; recitalist for Shanghai Oriental Arts Center in China, Nevada Chamber Music Festival, L'Hermitage Foundation and Bruman Summer Concerts in Los Angeles, Associazione Contrappunto in Tuscany, Tons Voisin Festival in Albi, France, La Musica International Chamber Festival in Sarasota, Florida, Mill Valley Chamber Music Society, Round Top International Festival Institute, Miami Music Festival, Chamber Music Unbound in California and recital tours throughout Europe and Asia.

Colón's recordings are featured on the Enharmonic, Centaur, Zephyr, and Lyras labels. Colón currently records for Klavier as a solo cellist, chamber musician, conductor, and composer under the label. Colón's arrangements, editions and original compositions are published by Masters Music Publications and H.P. Music Publications.

As the second youngest faculty member to be appointed in the history of the Jacobs School of Music at Indiana University, Colón is also known as a pedagogue. He has offered courses at the Conservatoire de Paris, the Geneva Conservatoire, the Franz Liszt Academy of Music, and Toho Gakuen in Tokyo. He is also on faculty at the International Festival-Institute at Round Top in Texas and Chamber Music Unbound at the Mammoth Lakes Music Festival in California.

As President of the American Cello Institute, he is the founder and artistic director of its main project, the International Chamber Orchestra of Puerto Rico. A 501(c)3 non-profit organization, it has won consecutive awards from the National Endowment for the Arts, National Endowment for the Humanities, and Puerto Rican Foundation for the Humanities: along with awards from the Titin Foundation and Flamboyan Foundation for providing free access to the arts through concerts, young artist fellowships, and outreach events for under-served communities in Puerto Rico and throughout the Caribbean, US, and Canada through educational televised programming.

As host and producer of the television series "Beethoven in the Caribbean" and "Music and Puerto Rico", Emilio is an advocate of making classical music accessible and engaging in the digital world, appearing on CBS Puerto Rico, ABC USVI, NBC and the CW in markets in Puerto Rico, Caribbean, US, Canada, and Guam.

== Recordings ==
- Title: Esencia, Klavier label
  - Co-producer for the album, arranger, and cello soloist
  - Description: All new arrangements by Emilio Colón for cello and piano.
  - Program: Lecuona; Danzas Afro-Cubanas Ginastera; Danzas Argentinas Piazzolla; Nuevo Tango: Oblivion, Tzigane Tango, Milonga del Angel, Muerte del Angel Danzas Célebres Puertorriqueñas Morel Campos; Felices Días Mislán; Tu y Yo Miranda; Impromptu, Op.10 Colón: Armando's Waltz for Cello and Piano (premiere).
- Title: Alma Latina, The Latin Soul of the Cello, Klavier label, international distribution
  - Emilio Colón, cello and Sung Hoon Mo, piano. Cello and piano pieces from Spain and Latin America.
  - Program: Ginastera; Pampeana No. 2, Op. 21 Ponce (arr. Cassadó); Estrellita Falla (arr. Colón); Siete Canciones Populares Españolas Piazzolla; Le Grand Tango Villa-Lobos; Pequena Suite Morel-Campos (arr. Colón); Bella Illusión Tavárez (arr. Colón); Un Recuerdito Danza capricho Turina (arr. Colón); Tres Sonetos, Op. 54; 1. Anhelos (Desires) Sarasate (arr. Colón); Zigeunerweisen, Op. 20.
- Title: Obseción, Klavier label
  - Emilio Colón: Co-producer for the album, cellist, arranger, composer
  - Trio Amadé debut recording
  - Program: Copland; Vitebsk Bernstein; Trio Piazzolla; Las Cuatro Estaciones Porteñas Colón; "N" Tango for piano trio.

== Compositions ==
- Poeme: La Garza en El Daule (2022) — Inspired by the river Daule in Guayaquil, which serves as a source of life, energy, and beauty for the people and creatures in Ecuador, including the beautiful and unique bird, La Garza (or heron).
  - Commissioned by Don Ramón Sonnenholzner.
- Los Jolgoriosos (2007) — Salmetón for violin and piano
  - Dedication: for Jessica Mathaes on the occasion of her Cuypers 200th birthday; inspirado por mis queridos amigos Rafi y Ramonita.
  - Premiered on December 9, 2007 by Jessica Mathaes and Rick Rowley at Bates Recital Hall in Austin, Texas.
- Los Niños y las Minarets (2007)
  - Commissioned by Ellen Siegal and the Felici Trio.
  - Dedication: A mis queridos amigos The Felicio Trio y Ellen Siegal.
  - Premiered on August 1, 2007 by the Felici Trio at the Mammoth Lakes Festival in California.
  - Suite Miniatura for violin, cello, and piano
1. Ari y Sofía: El Juego de las Sillas
2. Bodie at Horshoe Lake
3. Erratics
4. Iris y Naomi: Libros de Niños
5. Ana y Elisa: Par' de Camisas
- Dana la Colorá (2007) — for double bass and piano
  - Commissioned by James Vandemark.
  - Dedication: A mi querido amigo JB and his lovely daughter Dana.
  - Premiered on June 9, 2007 at the International Festival-Institute in Roundtop Texas by James Vandemark and Nariaki Sugiura.
- Recuerdos de Tata (2007)
  - Commissioned by the Bloomington Symphony Orchestra.
  - Dedication: A lamemoria de dos seres queridos Elsie Ramírez de Roque y Evelina Cucalón de Fougeres.
  - Premiered on May 4, 2007 by Emilio Colón and the Bloomington Symphony Orchestra: Thomas Lowenheim, conductor.
  - Poemas Borincanos for cello and orchestra
1. La Casa Grande: La Casa Vieja de Maresúa
2. Tinayarí
3. Bonita
4. El Combate
- Antecedentes (2005) — for cello and piano as companions to Armando's Waltz
  - Premiered on April 10, 2005 recital at the Centro de Bellas Artes in San Juan, Puerto Rico
    - Doña Bele y Don Enrique
    - Armando's Waltz
    - Pambel
- Armando's Waltz (2002) — for cello and string quartet
- "N" Tango for Violin, Cello, and Piano (2001)
  - Premiered by Trio Amadé on September 23, 2001 at the Sommerabendmusik Series, St. Paul's Episcopal Church, Delray Beach, FL.
  - Recorded by Trio Amadé for Klavier Records in September 2001.
- Renaten Satz (1995) — for cello and string quartet
  - Commissioned by and premiered at the Cedar Arts Forum String Camp, Waterloo, IA.
- Romanza Para Emma (1995) — for cello and string quartet
- Tres Recuerdos (1994) — for piano trio and string orchestra
  - Commissioned by and premiered at the Cedar Arts Forum String Camp, Waterloo, IA.
- Fantasías Boricuas (1987) — for violin and piano
  - Guánica
  - Jíbaro
  - Impro sobre un seis
  - Madre
- Pena en Frustración (1986) — prelude for piano
- Amor: Tu y Dos Cuadros (1986) — for medium voice and piano
- Pensamiento (1985) — prelude for piano
- El Ladrón (1985) — for medium voice and piano
