= Gitti Pirner =

German pianist

Gitti Pirner (Margit Pirner, born June 26, 1943, in Immenstadt im Allgäu) is a German classical pianist and professor emeritus of the University of Music and Performing Arts Munich.

== Biography ==
Pirner grew up in Sonthofen. Having learned to play the piano from early childhood, she gave her first piano recital at the age of seven and Mozart's first piano concerto at the age of eight. When she was twelve, she played Mozart's 23rd Piano Concerto in A major, KV 488, as part of a solo concert, and received positive press coverage from the Westdeutsche Allgemeine Zeitung.

In 1956 the young Pirner went to study under Erik Then-Bergh in the Munich Musikhochshule. Pirner then went to study in Rome with Guido Agosti, Wilhelm Kempff, and finally Louis Hiltbrand at the Geneva Conservatory, where she won the first prize at the Geneva International Music Competition and, after her return to Munich, the Interpretationspreis.

Pirner taught a master class at the University of Music and Performing Arts Munich for 30 years until 2013 and holds a visiting professorship at the Zurich University of the Arts. In addition, she led courses in Tokyo and Shanghai and was a juror in international competitions.

== Awards ==
In 2004, Pirner received the Order of Merit of the Federal Republic of Germany. She lives since 21 May 1991 in Tutzing where she received the distinction of honorable citizen in 2010.
