= Nina Tichman =

American woman pianist

Nina Tichman (born 27 April 1949 in New York) is an American pianist. She studied at the Juilliard School in New York, which awarded her the Eduard-Steuermann-Prize for outstanding achievements, then in Europe with Alfons Kontarsky, Hans Leygraf and Wilhelm Kempff.

Tichman has received numerous prizes, including at the Busoni, Casagrande, ARD, Ferruccio Busoni International Piano Competition, European Piano Contest Bremen, and Mendelssohn competitions. Her recording of the complete works of Claude Debussy, which she also performed cyclically in New York and in Frankfurt. Works for piano and violoncello with the cellist Maria Kliegel and Beethoven's Piano Trio with the Xyrion Trio. She has also made further recordings with works by Bartók, Copland (complete work), Chopin, Corigliano, Fauré, Mendelssohn, Penderecki, Reger.

Since 1993, Tichman has been professor for piano at the Hochschule für Musik und Tanz Köln and gives master classes in the USA (Princeton, Amherst, IKIF), in Europe (European Academy Palazzo Ricci, Mozarteum Salzburg, Seelscheider Musiktage), Japan (Aichi University of the Arts) and China.
