= Reimar Dahlgrün =

German pianist

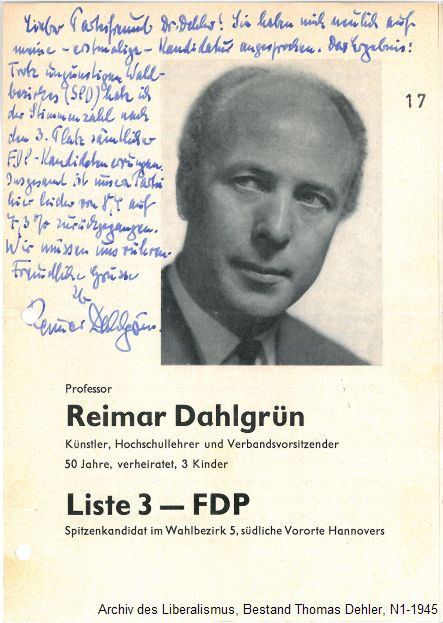
Reimar Dahlgrün to Thomas Dehler on a leaflet for the local elections, September 1964

Reimar Dahlgrün (7 April 1914 – 16 April 1982) was a German pianist, professor at the Hochschule für Musik, Theater und Medien Hannover and journalist.

== Life ==
Born in Hanover during the Weimar Republic, Dahlgrün attended the Hanoverian Kaiser-Wilhelm- und Ratsgymnasium Hannover and passed his Abitur there. During the Nazi era, he studied from 1933 to 1938 at the "Städtische Konservatorium" (today Hochschule für Musik, Theater und Medien Hannover) as well as at the Universität der Künste Berlin, where, among other things, he took piano lessons with Conrad Hansen and conducting with Walther Gmeindl

After the end of the Second World War and even before the founding of the Federal Republic of Germany, Dahlgrün led a piano class at the Municipal Conservatory in Hanover from 1946 onwards and performed at the piano and as piano accompanist. At the time of the reconstruction of the city, 48% of which was destroyed by the bombing of Hanover in World War II, the Filmtheater was opened on Kröpcke 1953 with a festive prelude by Dahlgrün on Grand piano.

From 1959, Dahlgrün was promoted to professor at the Municipal Conservatory and headed the department solo class there. He initiated the international exchange of the Hanoverian Academy of Music with institutes in cities such as Brussels, Copenhagen and Milan. The musician was in demand as a jury for music competitions and published in numerous professional journals.

Dahlgrün was temporarily chairman of the Deutscher Tonkünstlerverband as well as the Lower Saxony state committee of the Jugend musiziert. He was also chairman of the Association of Liberal Professions in the State of Lower Saxony.

From 1964, Dahlgrün was politically active in the Free Democratic Party (FDP). He was a candidate for the local elections in Lower Saxony in 1964 as well as for the 1965 West German federal election unsuccessfully on the Lower Saxony State list according to files in the Archive of Liberalism of the Friedrich Naumann Foundation for Freedom.

As a long-standing member of the "Hannoversche Künstlerverein" (HKV), an association for artists, Dahlgrün was its chairman from 1966 until his death in 1982. His successor at the HKV was Gotthard Kronstein.

Dahlgrün died in Hanover at the age of 68.

== Honours ==
- Reimar Dahlgrün was awarded the Officer cross of the Order of Leopold II of Belgium.
- Dahlgrün was appointed honorary citizen of the city of Fort Worth in Texas.
