= Sheila Arnold =

American politician (1929–1997)

Member of the Wyoming House of Representatives
- In office 1978–1992

Personal details
- Born: January 15, 1929 New York City, U.S.
- Died: June 12, 1997 (aged 68)
- Party: Democratic

Sheila Arnold (January 15, 1929 – June 12, 1997) was an American politician in the state of Wyoming. She served in the Wyoming House of Representatives as a member of the Democratic Party. She worked in the investment business and is an alumna of the University of California, Los Angeles.
