= Mitsuko Shirai =

Japanese mezzo-soprano (born 1947)

- 白井 光子
- Born: 28 May 1947 (age 78); Nagano Prefecture, Japan
- Occupations: Singer (mezzo-soprano); academic
- Organisation: Hochschule für Musik Karlsruhe

Mitsuko Shirai (born 28 May 1947) is a Japanese mezzo-soprano and music professor.

== Biography ==
Born in Nagano, Shirai first trained in Tokyo before settling in Germany, where she completed her vocal studies with Elisabeth Schwarzkopf. Between 1973 and 1976, she took prizes in competitions at Vienna, Zwickau, 's-Hertogenbosch, Athens, and Munich. She made her recital début in Tokyo in 1975, her European début in Amsterdam the following year. In 1989 she made her New York début at Carnegie Hall, in Ravel's Shéhérazade.

In 1973 Shirai formed a duo with the pianist Hartmut Höll. The pair have toured extensively, performing repertory from Scarlatti to the complete vocal works of Anton Webern, and have given masterclasses in Europe, the USA and Israel. In 1997 the two were awarded the ABC International Music Award.

Shirai has made occasional excursions into opera, including an admired Despina at Frankfurt in 1987, and has appeared in concert versions of Lucio Silla, Wagner's Das Liebesverbot, and Dukas's Ariane et Barbe-bleue.

Other orchestral appearances have been with the Berlin Philharmonic, New Japan Philharmonic, Atlanta Symphony, Nouvel Orchestre Philharmonique de Paris and the Vienna Symphony. Conductors include Riccardo Chailly, Eliahu Inbal, Yuri Ahronovitch, Ferencic and Wolfgang Sawallisch.

== Teaching ==
In 1992 she was appointed professor of singing at the Hochschule für Musik Karlsruhe.

She has presented masterclasses at the Savonlinna Opera Festival, the Schleswig-Holstein Musik Festival, and the Aldeburgh Festival, as well as in Switzerland, the USA, and at Isaac Stern's Jerusalem Music Centre.

== Selected discography ==
- Haydn: Arianna a Naxos; English Canzonettas (1990) Camerata Records
- 2x Winterreise (1991) Capriccio Records
- Othmar Schoeck: Das Holde Bescheiden (1993) Claves
- Lieder mit Viola (Songs with Viola) (1995) Capriccio Records
- Schubert-Edition: Die Schöne Müllerin; Winterreise (1997) Capriccio Records
- Schumann: Frauenliebe und –Leben, Op. 42, Liederkreis, Op. 39 (1997) Camerata Records
- Wolf: Mörike-Lieder (1998) Capriccio Records
- Norbert Burgmüller: Chamber Music (2000) MDG
- LiedOpera: Franz Schubert, Vol. 1, Op. 1–24 (2000) Capriccio Records
- Schumann: Songs/Lieder (2003) Brilliant
- Europäisches Liederbuch (2003) Capriccio Records
- Lied Edition (10 CDs) (2004) Capriccio Records
- Paul Dukas: Ariane et Barbe-Bleue (2011) Capriccio Records
- Schumann: Myrthen, Op. 25 (selections); Lenau-Lieder, Op. 90 (unknown date) Brilliant
- Schubert: Abendröte; Spohr: Deutsche Lieder (unknown date) Capriccio Records
- Wolf: Goethe-Lieder (unknown date) Capriccio Records
- Robert Franz: Selected Songs (unknown date) Capriccio Records
- Mozart: 21 Lieder (unknown date) Delta Distribution
- Mahler: Lieder (unknown date) Capriccio Records
- Franz Schubert: Lieder (unknown date) Capriccio Records
- Richard Strauss: Ausgewählte Lieder (unknown date) Capriccio Records
- Hölderlin Gesänge (1994) Capriccio Records
- Schönberg: Ausgewählte Lieder (unknown date) Capriccio Records
- Schumann-Lieder (unknown date) Capriccio Records
- Schubert: Winterreise, D 911 (unknown date) Capriccio Records
- Alban Berg: Lieder, 1900–1925 (unknown date) Capriccio Records
- Schumann: Liederkreis, Op. 39 (unknown date) Capriccio Records
- Brahms: 21 Lieder (unknown date) Capriccio Records
- Webern: Early Songs, Op. 3, 4, 12 (unknown date) Capriccio Records
- Franz Liszt: 16 Lieder (unknown date) Capriccio Records
- Wolf: Songs with Orchestra (2012), Capriccio 5101–four orchestral songs of Wolf with the Berlin Radio Orchestra and David Shallon

== Prizes ==
1982 Robert-Schumann-Preis

1996 Großen Idemitsu-Musikpreis

1997 ABC International Music Award

2008 “Verdienstmedaille am violetten Band“ donated by the Emperor of Japan

2010 Bundesverdienstkreuz

2018 “The Order of the Rising Sun, Gold Rays with Rosette” donated by the Emperor of Japan regarding her engagement for the German Lied and culture

2018 Ehrendoktorwürde by the University of Victoria / Canada (Dr. honoris causa)
