= Konstanze Eickhorst =

German pianist

Konstanze Eickhorst (born 1961, in Bremen) is a German pianist.

Eickhorst won the IX Clara Haskil (1981) and IV Géza Anda (1988) competitions. A member of the Linos Ensemble, she has been active at an international level as a soloist and a chamber musician, and has recorded for CPO. She teaches at the Musikhochschule Lübeck.
