= Domkonzerte Königslutter =

Music festival in Germany

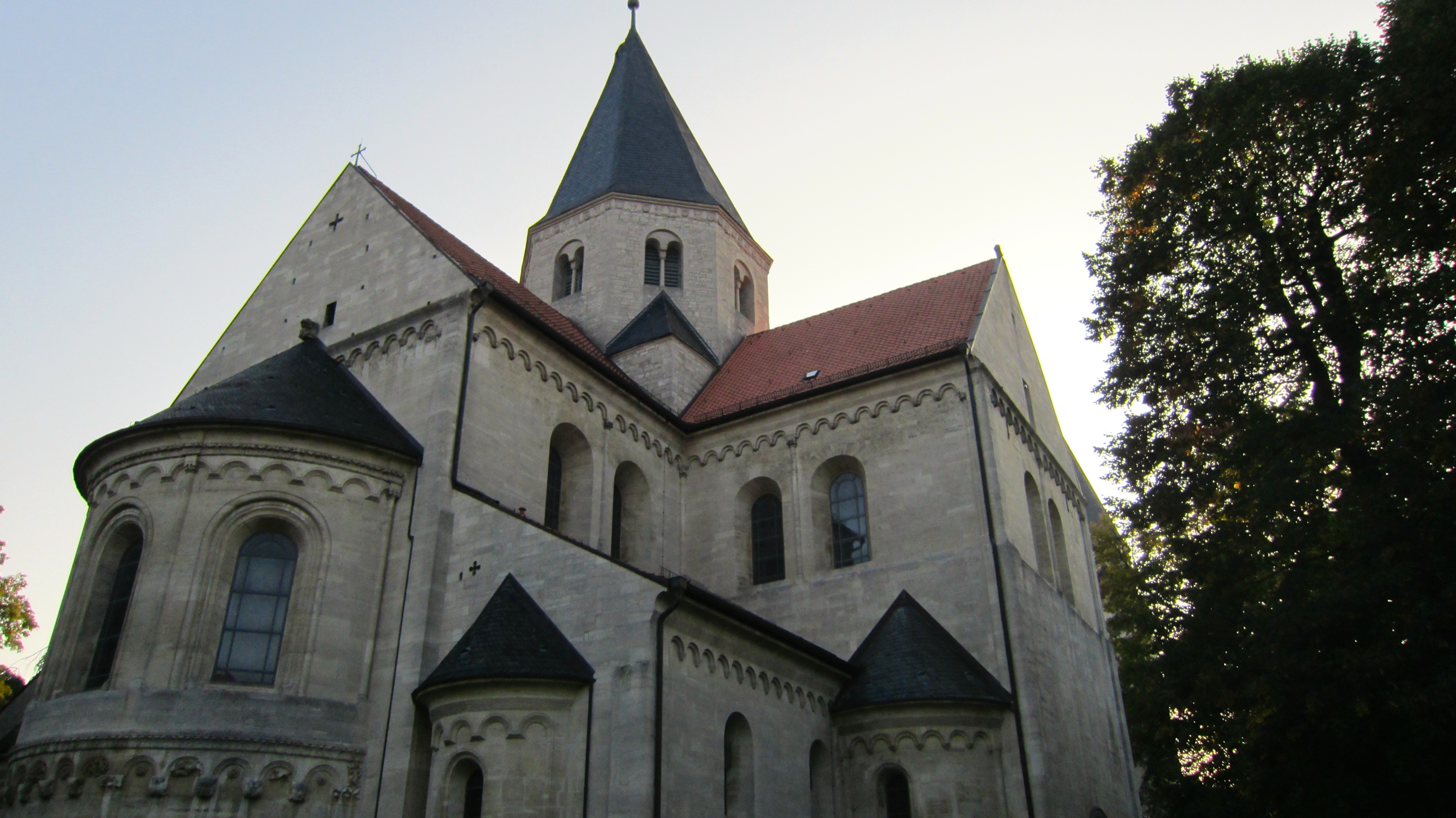
Königslutter

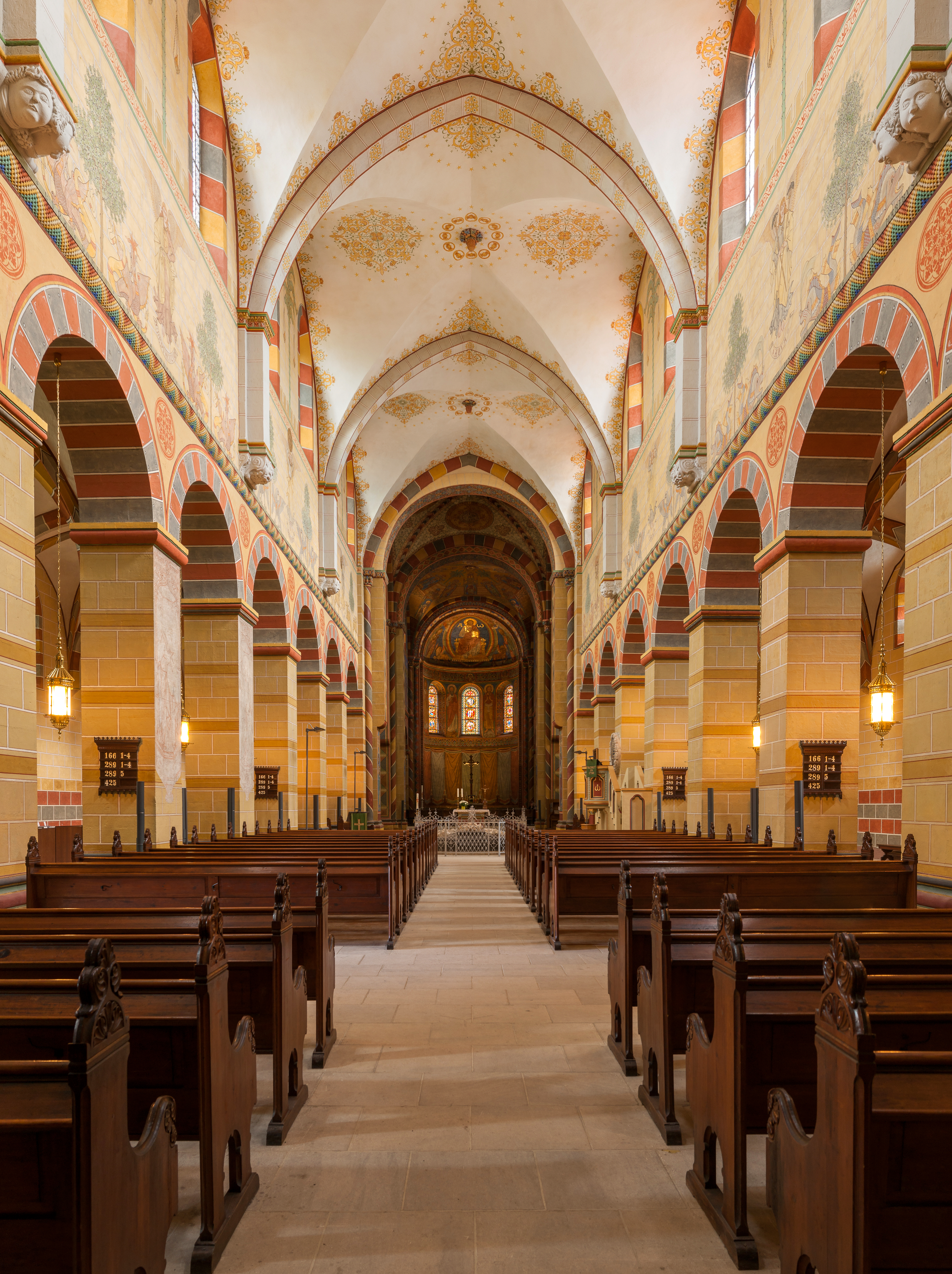
Kircheninnenraum

The Domkonzerte Königslutter have been the annual music festival in the Kaiserdom at Königslutter in Lower Saxony district of Helmstedt since 1980.

== History ==
The Domkonzerte Königslutter were established in 1980. Since then, 6-10 events have been held annually for a fortnight in September in the Kaiserdom Königslutter as well as in the cloister and other venues. In addition to concerts of various genres such as classical music, klezmer, salon music, a cappella, gospel and church music, festival worships with musical accompaniment and literature readings are offered on two Sundays.

Since 2016, Thomas Krause has been artistic director of the Königslutter Cathedral Concerts.

== Artists (selection) ==
Staatsorchester Braunschweig, soloists and Opera Choir of the Staatstheater Braunschweig, Cathedral Choir and Königslutter Trombone Choir, Herbert Feuerstein, Babette Haag, Helge Burggrabe, Hans-Dieter Karras, Cappella Istropolitana, Corinna Waldbauer, Maulbronner Kammerchor, Jan-Gregor Kremp and Olaf Weiden, Flautando Köln, Los Romeros, Martin Weller, Bachorchester zu Leipzig, Dresdner Kreuzchor, Kammerchor der Frauenkirche Dresden, Ensemble Frauenkirche Dresden, Matthias Grünert, Annette Markert (mezzo-soprano) and Wolfgang Kupke (organ), Per Arne Glorvigen Trio, Ensemble Amarcord, Bernd Bartels (trumpet and corno da caccia), VocaMe, Günther Maria Halmer and Frank Fröhlich, brass ensemble Ludwig Güttler, Mitteldeutsches Kammerorchester with Andreas Hartmann,

Hanna Victoria Permann (violin), Bremer Kaffeehaus-Orchester, David Orlowsky Trio, Elm Saxophone Quartet, Viva Voce and soloists from the Gewandhausorchester Leipzig, Göttinger Symphonie Orchester, Wildes Holz, Philharmonic Brass Dresden, Paul Maar and Capella Antiqua Bambergensis, Sweet Soul Gospel, Baroque Ensemble of the Staatsorchester Braunschweig with Martin Weller and Salomo Schweizer, Giora Feidman and Sergej Tcherepanov (organ), Till Brönner and Dieter Ilg, Avi Avital (mandolin) and Aydar Gaynullin (accordion), Basta, Cameron Carpenter, Gismo Graf Trio, Thomanerchor Leipzig, Canadian Brass.

== Sponsorship ==
The Domkonzerte Königslutter are supported by the city of Königslutter, the "Verein Domkonzerte Königslutter e.V.", the "Domgemeinde Königslutter", the Stiftung Braunschweigischer Kulturbesitz as owner of the property as well as numerous sponsors and patrons.
