= Walkenrieder Kreuzgangkonzerte =

German music festival

Coordinates: 51°34′59″N 10°37′09″E

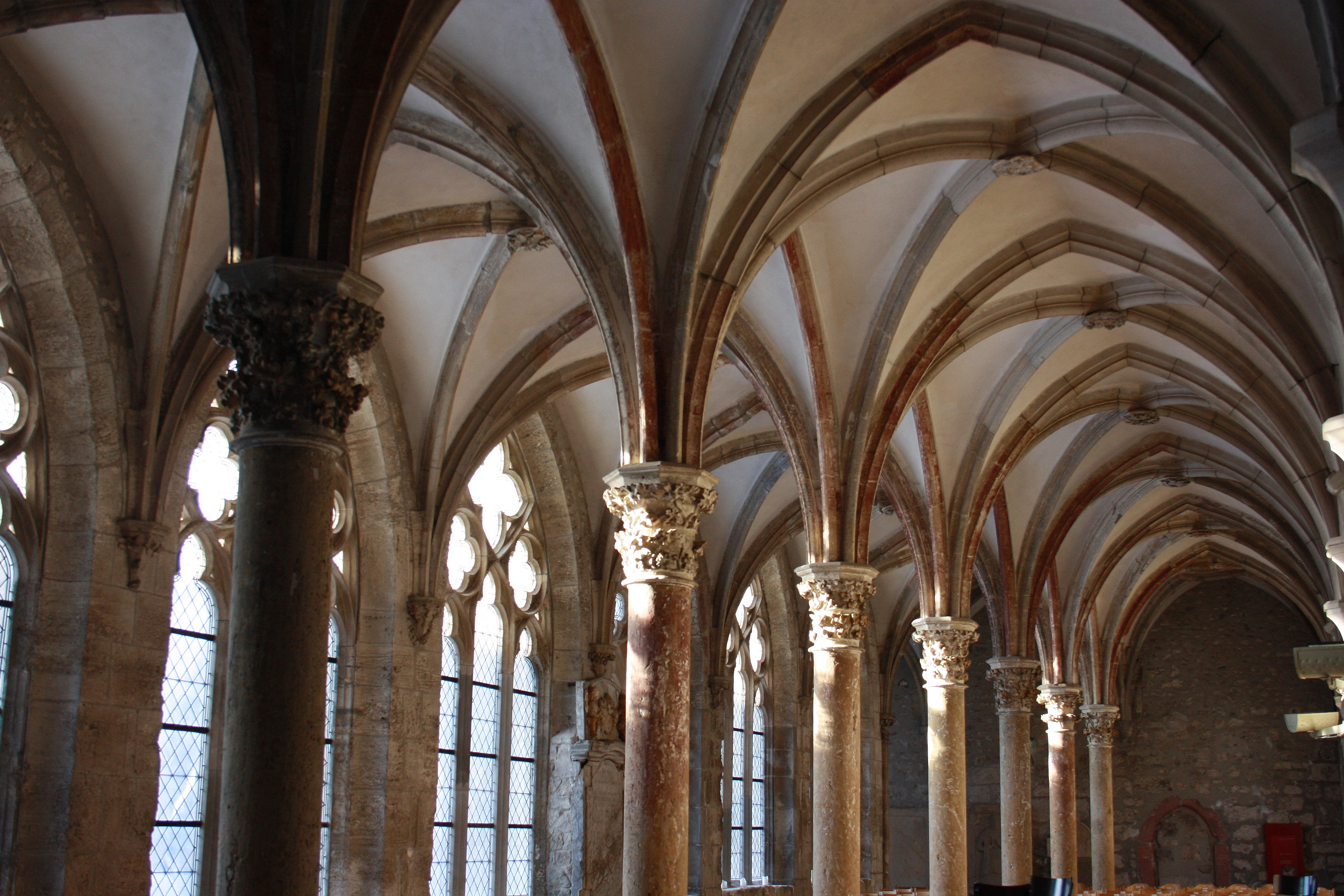
Walkenried Abbey – Double-nave cloister, today concert hall in the World Heritage Site (2010)

The Walkenrieder Kreuzgangkonzerte have been the annual music festival of Walkenried Abbey in Lower Saxony Göttingen district since 1983.

Since 2010, the Walkenried Abbey venue has been part of the World Heritage Site Upper Harz Water Regale.

== Preliminary work ==
From 1980 onwards, extensive redevelopment and restoration measures began in Walkenried Abbey, whereby the cloister, which had been open until then, received its leaded windows. The installation of warm-air underfloor heating in the double cloister this area of the monastery could for the first time, all year round, be culturally used.

These construction measures under the direction of the then Chief District Director Friedrich-Karl Böttcher, who accompanied the reconstruction until his retirement in 1999, laid the foundation for the cloister concerts.

== History ==
The Walkenried Cloister Concerts were founded in 1983. Three classical concerts in the first season became a music festival with regularly up to 20 events. In recent years, literary readings with and without music accompaniment have been added to the variety of concerts. The genre today includes classical, salon music, gospel, folk, swing, jazz, a cappella and pop music.

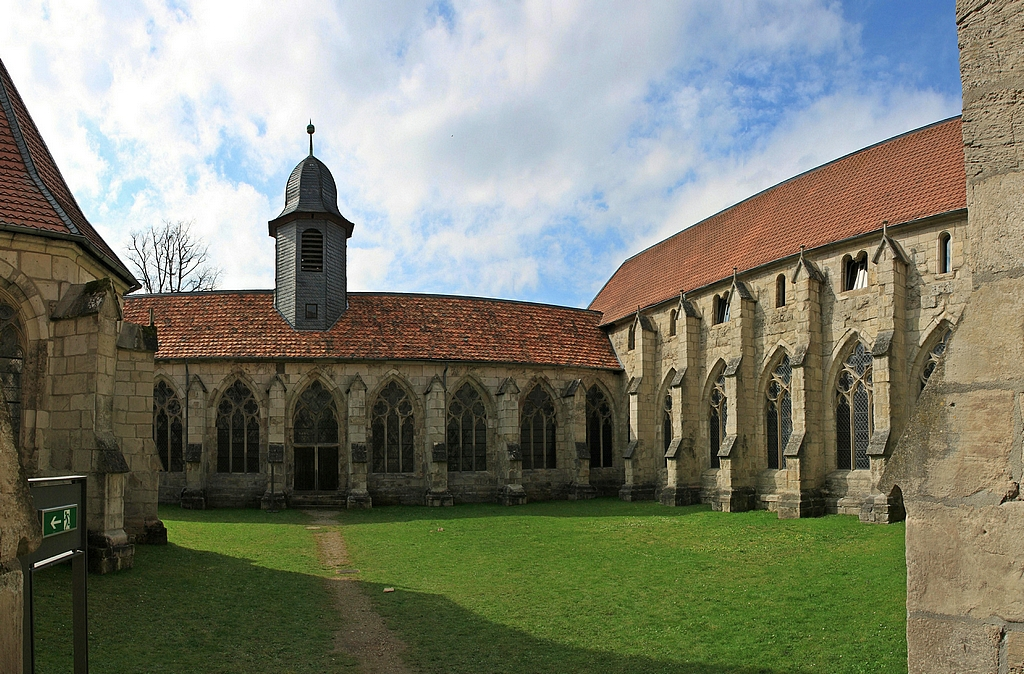
Kloster Walkenried – Kreuzgarten

The ambitious season begins in May with the Opening Concert and ends in December with the Concert Between the Years. Over the course of a year, two to four events are offered monthly in the double cloister of the Walkenried Monastery and in summer also in the Cloister Garden. Up to 5,000 listeners attend the Walkenried cloister concerts each season.

The artistic director from 1999 to 2014 was Friedrich-Karl Böttcher. As of 2015, the Landkreis Osterode am Harz as the sponsor and the Stiftung Braunschweigischer Kulturbesitz as the owner of the monastery complex have entrusted the artistic direction of the concerts to an advisory board. Thomas Krause has been appointed artistic director of the Walkenried Cloister Concerts.

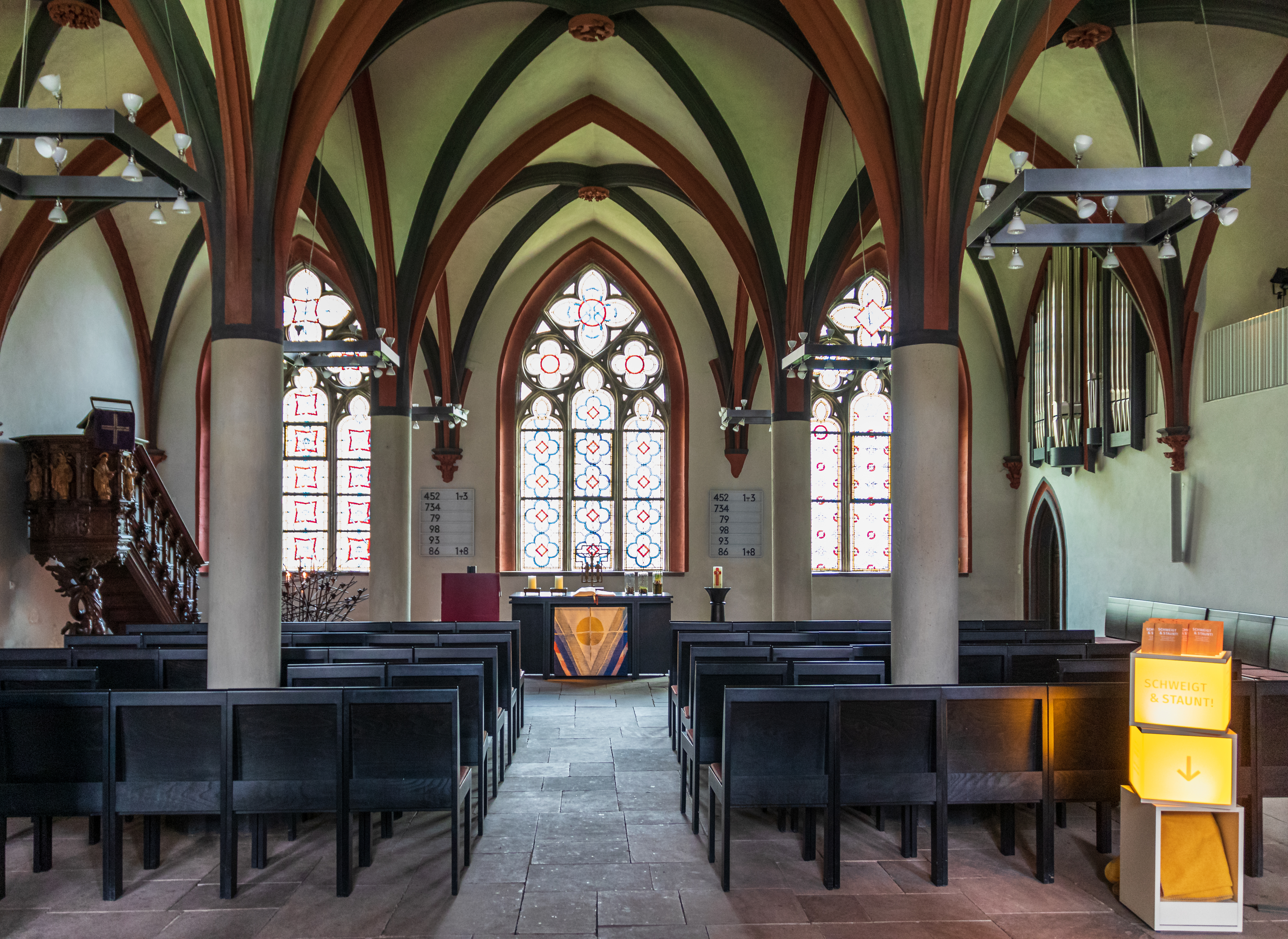
Walkenried Monastery – Chapter House

The 32nd Cloister Concerts brought some innovations to the events. In 2015, for example, a concert meditation was offered for the first time, an afternoon concert at 3 p.m. with coffee and cake, a concert in the chapter house of the monastery, as well as a walking concert with buffet.

For the first time in 2015, the Walkenried Cloister concerts organised the KINO IM KLOSTER – OpenAir in the Cloister Garden together with the Cistercian Museum and the Central-Lichtspiele Herzberg am Harz. The cult film The Name of the Rose was shown in conjunction with a themed tour of the locations that also play a role in the film.

The venue Walkenried Abbey has been a UNESCO World Heritage Upper Harz Water Regale site since 2010.

The café in Walkenried Monastery is open during the cloister concerts.

== Artists (selection) ==
Since their inception, the Walkenried Cloister Concerts have been arranged by top-class artists and personalities, such as, among others:

Abegg Trio, Hermann Prey, Margaret Price, Thomas Quasthoff, Ludwig Güttler, Alban Berg Quartet, Pepe Romero, Norbert Blüm, Göttinger Symphonie Orchester, Gerhard Schöne, Thekla Carola Wied, Götz Alsmann, Dieter Bellmann, Main-Barockorchester Frankfurt, Elke Heidenreich, Captain Cook und seine singenden Saxophone, Henryk Böhm (baritone) and Gerrit Zitterbart, Bachorchester zu Leipzig, Jochen Kowalski and Junges Barockorchester Berlin, Philharmonic Brass Dresden, Giora Feidman and Gitanes Blondes, Qntal, Ulrike Kriener and Gudrun Haag (harp), Bläsersolisten der Staatskapelle Berlin, Vokalensemble VocaMe, Ralf Bauer and Emil Rovner (violoncello), Mitteldeutsche Kammerphilharmonie, Ensemble Frauenkirche Dresden with Matthias Grünert, Ensemble Amarcord, Denis Wittberg (singer) and his Shellac soloists, Staatsorchester Braunschweig in Barockbesetzung, Dresdner Kapellsolisten, Pater Anselm Grün with Hans-Jürgen Hufeisen and Oskar Göpfert, Felix Klieser und Michael Schäfer, Andreas Hartmann mit dem Thüringer-Salonquintett, David Orlowsky Trio, Jörg Faßmann with Lenka Matějáková and Cornelia Osterwald "Barocktrio Dresden-Leipzig", Chursächsische Capelle Leipzig, Staatsorchester Braunschweig in großen Besetzung, Viva Voce, New York Polyphony (vocal music from the Middle Ages and Renaissance), Los Romeros, Anne Schoenen and Band "Die SCHOENEN", Günther Maria Halmer and Jörg Fuhrländer (accordion), Bolero Berlin – Berliner Philharmoniker einmal anders, Wilhelm Bruns with the Parforcehorn Ensemble "Les Amazones",

Mitteldeutsches Kammerorchester, Ulrich Pleitgen, Figurentheater Gingganz, Bremer Kaffeehaus-Orchester, Schola Gregoriana Pragensis (Prague) and Buddhists of the Tendai School "Gjosan-rjù" (Japan), Gregor Gysi and Friedrich Schorlemmer, Loh-Orchester Sondershausen, Bernd Kaftan (actor) and Michael Schäfer (piano), Giora Feidman and Rastrelli Cello Quartet, Basta (a cappella group), Rapalje (Celtic folk music), Gunter Schoß (speaker) and Frank Fröhlich (guitar), Erzgebirgsensemble Aue, Salonorchester Cappuccino, Capellchor Halle of the Evangelische Hochschule für Kirchenmusik Halle with the Bach Consort, Gitanes Blondes, Sky du Mont, Frank Vitzhum (countertenor) and Julian Behr (lute), Till Brönner and Dieter Ilg, Thomanerchor Leipzig, MozART group, Stefan Gwildis,

Gamain (Celtic Folk Music), Christian Funke (violin) and Stefan Altner (organ), Klenke Quartet, Anne Schierack (vocals) and Frank Fröhlich (guitar), vocal ensemble Niniwe, Brass-Band Federspiel, Peter Hahne, Avi Avital and Aydar Gaynullin, Staatsorchester Braunschweig with Salomo Schweizer, Volker Heißmann and Pavel Sandorf Quartet, wind soloists of the Gewandhausorchester in Leipzig, Giora Feidman with Enrique Ugarte and Torsten Münchow, Göttinger Symphonie Orchester with Niklas Liepe, Paul Maar and Capella Antiqua Bambergensis, Tine Thing Helseth and Ensemble "tenThing", Moskauer Kathedralchor, Gismo Graf Trio, Ensemble International, Andrea Sawatzki, Canadian Brass, Christoph Grohmann. Andreas Englisch, Tim Fischer and band, ElphCellisten, Uwaga!, Katharina Thalbach, Zucchini Sistaz, London Brass, Andrea Sawatzki & Christian Berkel.

Many of the artists and personalities mentioned here have been coming to Walkenried Monastery again and again for a guest performance for years.

== Cinema in the monastery ==
Since the summer of 2015, there has been the KINO IM KLOSTER – OpenAir in the Kreuzgarten. The following films were shown in Walkenried Monastery:

- 2015: The Name of the Rose
- 2017: The Blues Brothers

== CD recordings ==
The outstanding acoustics in the double-nave cloisters have also been used for CDs recordings.

- 1997: Gewandhaus Wind Quintet Leipzig at Walkenried Monastery.
- 1998: Chamber Music Association Johann Joachim Quantz Potsdam – Concert Recording.

== Sponsorship ==
The Walkenrieder Kreuzgangkonzerte have been a series of events organised by the Landkreis Osterode am Harz in cooperation with the Förderkreis Kloster Walkenried since 1983. All events are supported only by entrance fees and sponsors. No public funds flow for this.

In 2015, the owner of the property Walkenried Monastery, the Stiftung Braunschweigischer Kulturbesitz (SBK), took over the sponsorship of the cloister concerts from the district of Osterode am Harz.

The Walkenried Kreuzgang Concerts are sponsored by the Landschaftsverband Südniedersachsen.
