= Niklas Liepe =

German classical violinist

Niklas Liepe (born 2 March 1990) is a German classical violinist.

== Life ==
Born in Göttingen, Liepe began his early studies at the age of twelve at the Institute for the Early Promotion of Musically highly gifted at the Hochschule für Musik, Theater und Medien Hannover (HMTM) and received lessons there from Krzysztof Węgrzyn. His studies took place at the Hochschule für Musik und Tanz Köln with Zakhar Bron and Mihaela Martin as well as at the Kronberg Academy with Ana Chumachenco and for chamber music with Oliver Wille at the HMTM Hannover.

Liepe has successfully participated in numerous national and international competitions. He is a prizewinner of the Deutscher Musikwettbewerb, the European Broadcasting Union New Talent Competition, a two-time winner of the Henryk Wieniawski Violin Competition Poland, the International Kocian Violin Competition Czech Republic, cultural prize winner of the Norddeutscher Rundfunk, the Braunschweig Classix Competition, the International Da Ponte Competition and the Gdańsk Festival Weeks in Poland.

Liepe has performed as a soloist with the Frankfurter Opern- und Museumsorchester, the Slovak Radio Symphony Orchestra, the Camerata Wrocław, the Deutsche Radio Philharmonie Saarbrücken Kaiserslautern, the Staatsorchester Braunschweig, the Vogtland Philharmonie Greiz Reichenbach, the Staatsorchester Braunschweig, the Staatsorchester Rheinische Philharmonie, the Brandenburgisches Staatsorchester Frankfurt (Oder), the Landesjugendsinfonieorchester Hessen as well as the East-West Chamber Orchestra and the Bayerisches Kammerorchester Bad Brückenau. His conducting partners have included Christoph Eschenbach, John Holloway, Gregor Bühl, Hartmut Haenchen, Heribert Beissel, Jiri Malát and Nicolás Pasquet. He has played concerts throughout Europe, Australia, the US and Asia and has appeared at festivals such as the Schwetzingen Festival and Dresden Music Festival, the Walkenrieder Kreuzgangkonzerte, the Verbier Festival in Switzerland, and the International Art Festival in Russia.

Chamber music also finds its place in Liepe's artistic output. He has performed with artists such as Gidon Kremer, Yuri Bashmet, Fazıl Say, Christoph Eschenbach and András Schiff. He has been performing in the Duo Liepe together with his brother, the pianist Nils Liepe, since his youth. In 2017, he founded an international festival in Hanover together with Nils Liepe. In addition, there are progressive projects, such as The New Paganini Project.

Liepe plays on a violin by Guarneri del Gesù.

== Recording ==
- 2020 GoldbergReflections (Sony Classical). NDR Radiophilharmonie under the conduct of Jamie Phillips.
- 2018 The New Paganini Project(Sony Classical). Deutsche Radiophilharmonie Saarbrücken/Kaiserslautern.
- 2014 Impresiones Espanolas. (Profil, DDD). Works by Albeniz, Schtschedrin, Sarasate, Granados, Ginastera, Cassado and Turina.
