= Cornelia Osterwald =

German harpsichordist

Cornelia Osterwald (born 25 March 1975) is a German harpsichordist and docent for early music.

== Career ==
Born in Altenburg, Osterwald studied piano, harpsichord and fortepiano at the University of Music and Theatre Leipzig with Professor Helgeheide Schmidt and Professor Christine Schornsheim from 1993 to 2004. This was followed by postgraduate studies in early music with Professor Ludger Rémy at the Hochschule für Musik Carl Maria von Weber Dresden, and again with Christine Schornsheim in Leipzig.

She also attended master class and had private lessons with Walter Heinz Bernstein, Gustav Leonhardt, Andreas Staier and Menno van Delft.

Osterwald performs as a soloist and continuo player. She has performed as a soloist and basso continuo player at the Bachfest Leipzig, the Handel Festival Halle (Saale), the Saxon Mozart Festival Chemnitz and the Walkenrieder Kreuzgangkonzerte, as well as on Deutschlandfunk, Mitteldeutscher Rundfunk and the Norddeutscher Rundfunk.

In addition, she has also performed as a soloist and chamber musician among others in the Chemnitzer Barockorchester, Mendelssohn Leipzig Chamber Orchestra, Neues Bachisches Collegium Musicum, Telemannisches Collegium Michaelstein, Brandenburgisches Staatsorchester Cottbus, Staatsorchester Halle, Brandenburgisches Staatsorchester Frankfurt (Oder), Leipziger Barockorchester and Ensemble Frauenkirche Dresden.

Osterwald taught harpsichord, chamber music and correpetition at the Georg Friedrich Händel Conservatory in Halle and at the Martin Luther University of Halle-Wittenberg Institute of Music from 2001 to 2012.

Since 2004, she has held a teaching position in harpsichord, chamber music and accompaniment at the Hochschule für Musik und Theater "Felix Mendelssohn Bartholdy" Leipzig. In addition, she has been lecturer for harpsichord at the Evangelische Hochschule für Kirchenmusik Halle since 2011.

With Jörg Faßmann and Lenka Matějáková, she played in the "Baroque Trio Dresden-Leipzig".

Osterwald has made numerous CDs and radio recordings.

== Recording (selection) ==
- Johann Sebastian Bach: Flötensonaten (Bella Musica, 2009)
- Johann Sebastian Bach: J.S. Bach im Schloss Waldenburg (Papageno-Marketing, 2013)

== Critics ==
Technically and musically highly secure

— The Göttinger Tageblatt about a concert with the ensemble Quattrovaganti, 2006.

One would like to hear her more often

— The Lausitzer Rundschau über ein Konzert mit dem Bach Consort Cottbus, 2007

Highly virtuosic, fascinatingly natural

— Die Rheinpfalz about a concert with the Mendelssohn Chamber Orchestra Leipzig, 2008
