= Faßmann =

Faßmann is a German surname, with 'faß' meaning 'barrel' and 'mann' meaning 'man'. Notable people with the surname include:

- Heinz Faßmann (born 1955), Austrian politician and professor
- Jörg Faßmann (born 1966), German violinist and academic teacher
