= Klenke Quartet =

German string quartet

The Klenke Quartet is a German string quartet.

== History ==
The quartet was founded in 1991 at the Hochschule für Musik Franz Liszt, Weimar. Since then, the line-up has remained unchanged. The four members are: Annegret Klenke – Violin, Beate Hartmann – Violin, Yvonne Uhlemann – Viola and Ruth Kaltenhäuser – Violoncello. They live in Berlin and Thuringia. Their debut took place in 1994, and the quartet received support from mentors such as Norbert Brainin (Amadeus Quartet), Ulrich Beetz (Abegg Trio), Harald Schoneweg (Cherubini Quartet) and Sándor Devich (Bartók Quartet). The ensemble was supported by the Deutscher Musikrat and the Deutsche Stiftung Musikleben.

The ensemble has performed at festivals including the MDR Musiksommer, the Festspiele Mecklenburg-Vorpommern, the Harzburger Musiktage, the Walkenrieder Kreuzgangkonzerte and accompanied the then Federal President Johannes Rau to South America in 2003. Concerts took the quartet to Iran, Japan and the Netherlands in 2018.

From the beginning, the quartet sought collaboration with fellow musicians. Partners included Martin Stadtfeld, Matthias Kirschnereit, Jascha Nemtsov, Kolja Lessing, Alexander Bader, Nicola Jürgensen, Alexej Gerassimez as well as the Auryn Quartet and the Vogler Quartet. The members of the Cherubini Quartet Harald Schoneweg and Klaus Kämper completed the Klenke Quartet on the CD recording of Tchaikovsky String Sextet Souvenir de Florence. Harald Schoneweg (viola) also participated in the recording of Mozart's string quintets.

Of the CD recordings, the Haydn recording The Seven Last Words of Christ was awarded the "Choc de la musique" by Le Monde de la musique. The most recent Schubert CD, released in the Movimentos Edition, received the "Supersonic Award" from the Luxembourg magazine PIZZICATO in 2015. The Midem Classical Award of the Music Fair in Cannes was awarded in 2007 for another CD recording with string quartets by Mozart. The Harenberg Verlag Kulturführer Kammermusik 2008 recommends the Klenke Quartett's recordings as reference recordings for some of these quartets.

The quartet's repertoire also includes works for string quartet and orchestra by Arnold Schoenberg and Matthew Hindson. The European premiere of Hindson's concerto The Rave and the Nightingale was given by the Klenke Quartet in 2008 in Jena.

== Special activities ==
The quartet performs two concert series of its own. As a tribute to Weimar, where it was founded, the chamber music series AUFTAKT was founded in 2004, which regularly includes fellow musicians in the programme. The Humboldt Soirees, a concert series conceived for three years in the Heilig-Geist-Kapelle at the Humboldt-Universität zu Berlin, was also initiated and artistically directed by the Klenke Quartet.

A close connection with the German-American composer Ursula Mamlok, who died in 2016, led the Klenke Quartet to New York City for a performance of her 2nd String Quartet on her 90th birthday.

Another focus is on children's and family programmes to make the very young generation receptive to chamber music. Most recently, the programme included the children's musical theatre Die kleine Hexe, which was performed at the Tonhalle Düsseldorf, the Kölner Philharmonie, the Philharmonie Luxembourg, Hamburg's Laeiszhalle, the Wiener Konzerthaus and the Festspielhaus Baden-Baden.

== Awards ==
The Saxon Mozart Prize 2022 was awarded to the Klenke Quartet.

== Recording (selection) ==
- Claude Debussy: String Quartet op. 10
- Karl Goldmark: String Quartet in B flat major op. 8
- Joseph Haydn: String Quartet in F major op. 77/2, The Seven Last Words of Christ op. 51
- Felix Mendelssohn Bartholdy: String Quartet in A minor op. 13
- Wolfgang Amadeus Mozart: String Quartets in D minor K. 421, G major K. 387, B flat major K. 458, E flat major K. 428, A major K. 464, C major K. 465 ("Haydn" Quartets); String Quartets K. 499, 575, 589 and 590
- Franz Schubert: String Quartet in C minor D 703 "Quartettsatz", String Quartet in C major D 46, String Quartet in A minor D 804 "Rosamunde"
- Peter Tchaikovsky: String Quartets No. 1 in D major op. 11, No. 2 in F major op. 22, No. 3 in E flat minor op. 30, String Sextet in D minor op. 70 "Souvenir de Florence"
- Anton Webern: Six Bagatelles for String Quartet op. 9
- Wolfgang Amadeus Mozart: String quintets in B flat major KV 174, C minor KV 406, C major KV 515, G minor KV 516, D major KV 593, E flat major KV 614
- Emilie Mayer: String quartet in G minor
