= Salomo Schweizer =

Swiss oboist (born 1993)

Salomo Schweizer (born 1993) is a Swiss oboist and cor anglais player.

== Career ==
Born in Lucerne, Schweizer began his musical career as a recorder player and choir boy in the Lucerne Kantorei. At the age of 14, he switched to the oboe and was soon accepted into Kurt Meier's oboe class at the Lucerne Conservatory.

From 2013 to 2016, he studied at the Zurich University of the Arts in the classes of Simon Fuchs (solo oboe Tonhalle, Zürich) and Martin Frutiger (oboe and cor anglais). He then began a master's degree with Jean-Louis Capezzali in Lausanne and completed his studies with Dominik Wollenweber in Berlin.

As soloist, Schweizer performed among others with the Staatsorchester Braunschweig, the "Junge Philharmonie Zentralschweiz", the Neues Orchester Basel, the "Festivalorchester Arosa" and the "Stadtorchester Zug". He is also invited by various orchestras as solo oboist, including the 21st Century Symphony, the Orchester Musikkollegium Winterthur, the Hamburg State Opera and the Deutsche Oper Berlin.

He is also a guest at music festivals such as the Walkenrieder Kreuzgangkonzertes and the Domkonzerte Königslutter.

As of 2016, was Schweizer solo oboist in the Verbier Festival Orchestra, and since the 2017/18 season he has been solo oboist in the Staatsorchester Braunschweig.

== Prizes and awards ==
- 2012: 1st prize with distinction at the Schweizerischen Jugendmusikwettbewerb.
- 2012: 1st prize International Oboe Competition Luca Figaroli in Adrara San Martino.
- 2016: English Horn Award at The Muri Competition.
- 2017/18: Young Music Talents Foundation Prize Meggen of the Swiss Music Academies.
