= Eileen Kramer =

Australian dancer (1914–2024)

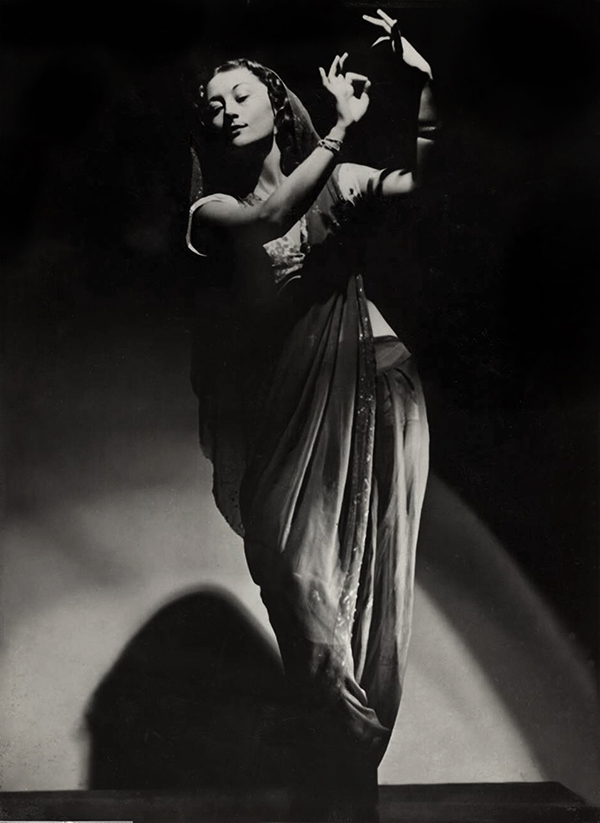
- Kramer, c. 1952
- Born: 8 November 1914; Mosman Bay, New South Wales, Australia
- Died: 15 November 2024 (aged 110 years, 7 days); New South Wales, Australia
- Education: Sydney Conservatorium of Music
- Occupations: Ballet dancer; choreographer; artist; actor
- Years active: 1943–2024
- Website: eileen-kramer.com

Eileen Kramer (8 November 1914 – 15 November 2024) was an Australian dancer, artist, performer, choreographer, and supercentenarian. She began by studying singing and music in Sydney in the 1930s, but after attending a performance of the Bodenwieser Ballet in 1940, she immediately decided on a career change to dance. After joining the troupe that had made such an impression on her, she toured around Australia and overseas for the next decade. She then lived and worked in France and the United States for the next 60 years, before returning to Australia at the age of 99, where she remained active in the arts until her death at the age of 110. Back in Australia, Kramer met choreographer/filmmaker Sue Healey, with whom she collaborated in several film and video works.

== Early life and education ==
Eileen Kramer was born on 8 November 1914, and grew up in Mosman Bay, Sydney, with one sibling, a brother. Her father, a car salesman, began showing signs of alcoholism when Kramer was about 10, leading to her mother leaving and secretly relocating with the children to the suburb of Coogee when Eileen was 13. Her mother then began working as a store detective at Farmers (now part of Myer), a department store on George Street.

In 1936, when her mother remarried, Kramer left home and lived in a shared cottage on Phillip Street until 1940 and studied singing at the Sydney Conservatorium of Music. To support herself, she worked as an usherette and an artist's model, at one time posing for Norman Lindsay.

In 1940, her mother took her to a charity concert which included "The Blue Danube", performed by Gertrud Bodenwieser's dance company. The next day, Kramer sought out Bodenwieser, and after successfully auditioning and completing three years of training, she joined Bodenwieser's main troupe and began her career in professional dance. The Bodenwieser style was expressionistic and used the body to show emotion.

== Career ==
Kramer toured Australia with the Bodenwieser Ballet for 10 years (from 1943 to 1953). The group also toured internationally post-war to France, New Zealand, South Africa, and India.

After leaving the troupe in 1953, Kramer travelled to India, then lived and worked in Paris as an artist's model, often for André Lhote and his studio. In 1957, aged 42, she met Israeli-American filmmaker Baruch Shadmi. The two collaborated on a mixed animated and live-action film, for which Kramer hand-made over 400 figures. At a casino in Dieppe, while Shadmi played roulette, she met Louis Armstrong, who taught her to do the twist. While working on their film in the mid-1960s, Shadmi had a stroke, and Kramer effectively put her dance career on hold for 18 years while caring for him in New York. He died in 1987.

In 1988, Kramer resumed her career and moved to Hinton to live with an old stage friend, before moving to Lewisburg in 1992. There she worked as both dancer and choreographer with the Trillium Performing Arts Collective. In 2008, she self-published her first book, Walkabout Dancer, an account of her life.

In September 2013, Kramer returned to Australia at the age of 99, because she missed the kookaburras and the smell of gum trees. There she met filmmaker/choreographer Sue Healey, with whom she began to collaborate. In 2014, to mark turning 100, she crowdfunded, choreographed, and performed a dance piece called "The Early Ones".

In 2017, she created a dance-drama A Buddha's Wife, inspired by her travels in India, part of a wider work celebrating her life, and supported by the Arts Health Institute.

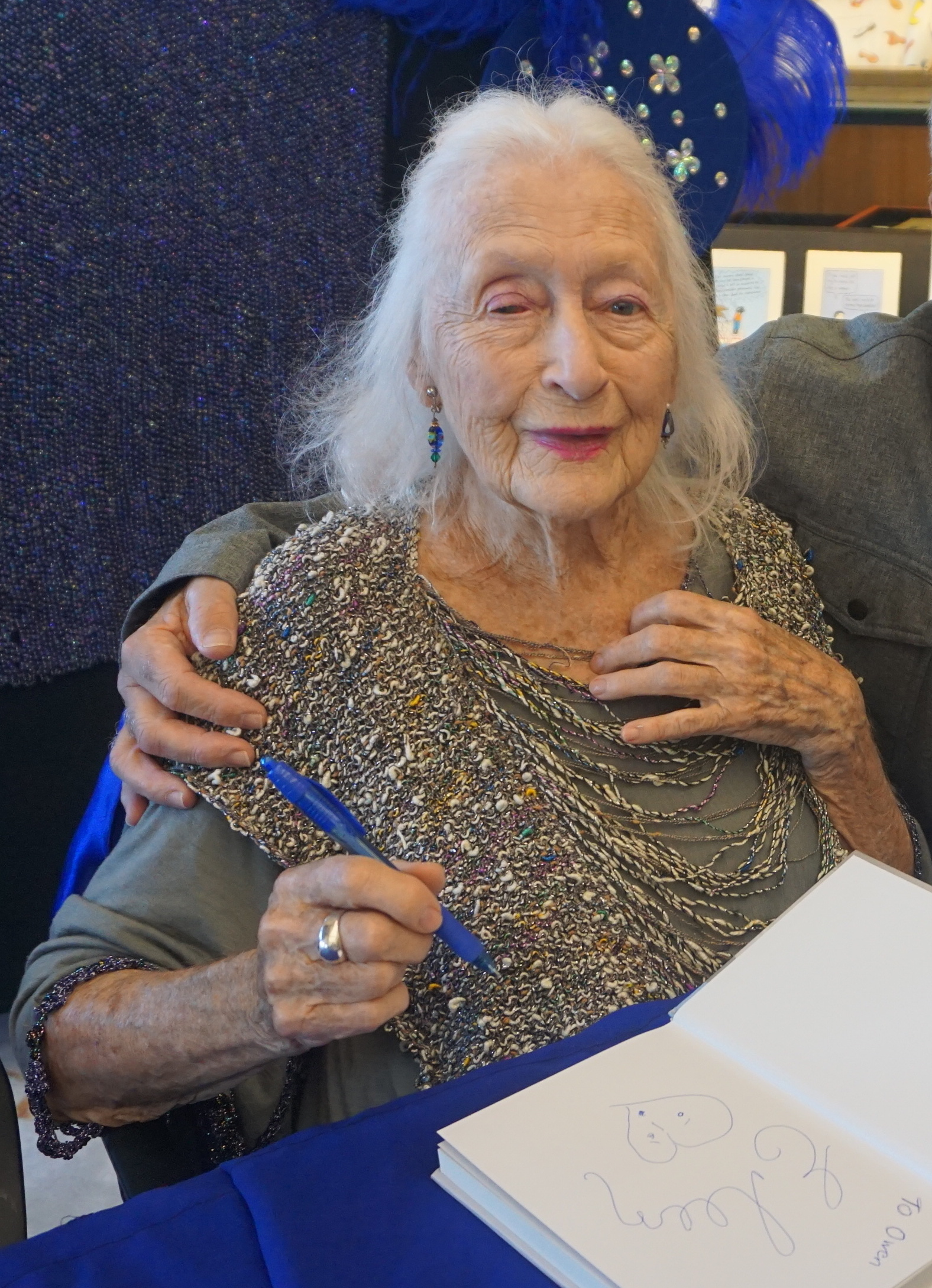
Kramer signing a copy of Eileen: Stories from the Phillip Street Courtyard in 2019

Kramer's memoir, co-written with Tracey Spring, Eileen: Stories from the Phillip Street Courtyard, was published in November 2018. In 2019, she entered a self-portrait for the Archibald Prize, becoming the award's oldest-ever contributor.

In 2022, Kramer made a video while dancing seated on a chair, to the instrumental piece "Eileen" by clarinettist David Orlowsky (of the David Orlowsky Trio) and lutenist David Bergmüller, from their album Alter Ego. The video was released in May 2022 and won the "video clip" award in the 2023 Opus Klassik prizes.

In 2024, Kramer once again worked with Sue Healey, this time in collaboration with composer and musician Laurence Pike, to create Afterworld, which features Kramer's final performance. The basis for the short film was Pike's 2024 album The Undreamt-of-Centre, which he wrote during the COVID-19 pandemic. The music was inspired by Greek mythology, modernist poet Rainer Maria Rilke's Sonnets to Orpheus, and Pike's personal experience of grief. Dancers Nadiyah Akbar, Josh Freedman, Benjamin Hancock, Taiga Kita-Leong, and Siobhan Lynch star in the film along with Kramer. The film premiered at the 2025 Sydney Festival, showing from 7 to 11 January at the Neilson Nutshell.

== Recognition ==
A portrait, The inner stillness of Eileen Kramer by plastic surgeon Andrew Lloyd Greensmith, was a finalist for the Archibald Prize in 2017.

Also in 2017, single-channel video portrait (6 minutes 3 seconds) of Kramer by choreographer/filmmaker Sue Healey was a finalist in the Digital Portrait Prize (National Portrait Gallery, Canberra). It was also a finalist in the Blake Prize (Casula Powerhouse, Sydney) in 2018. In September 2018, Healey was awarded the Australian Dance Award for Outstanding Achievement in Film or New Media.

In December 2018, Kramer was the featured guest on ABC's One Plus One interview program.

In 2015, she was nominated as one of the 100 Women of Influence Awards by The Australian Financial Review and Westpac.

== Personal life and death ==
Kramer never married nor had any children. Her first relationship was with Richard Want, her psychoanalyst, in 1936. She also had a romance with a French diplomat while in India. Kramer later had two extended relationships while living abroad, with Baruch Shadmi (1920–1987) and "rich Southern widower" William "Bill" D. Tuckwiller (died c.1997).

Kramer died in New South Wales on 15 November 2024, a week after her 110th birthday.

== Publications ==
- 2008, Walkabout Dancer (Trafford Publishing: ISBN 978-1-4251-7359-3)
- 2018 (with Tracey Spring), Eileen: Stories from the Phillip Street Courtyard (Melbourne Books: ISBN 978-1-9255-5639-1)

== Filmography ==
- 2017: Eileen – short film by Sue Healey
- 2020: The Witch of Kings Cross as herself (documentary)
- 2020: The End, as Rita (Episode: "Blood Sandwich")
- 2022: Eileen (short film; a collaboration between Sue Healey and European musicians David Orlowsky and David Bergmüller.) as the dancer
- 2024: On View: Icons, by Sue Healey, which premiered at the 2024 Sydney Festival
- 2025: Afterworld, a collaboration between Healey and composer and musician Laurence Pike, featuring Kramer's final performance.
