= Gregor Bühl =

German conductor and academic (born 1964)

- Born: 1964 (age 61–62); Birkesdorf, near Düren, Germany
- Origin: Germany
- Genres: Classical, Opera
- Occupations: Conductor, faculty professor
- Instrument: Orchestra
- Years active: 1991–present
- Website: gregorbuehl.at

Gregor Bühl (born 1964 in Birkesdorf near Düren) is a German opera and concert conductor and faculty professor of conducting and opera répétition at the University of Music Franz Liszt Weimar. He works internationally and has a broad repertoire encompassing works of the classical operatic canon as well as contemporary compositions.

== Education and early career ==
In 1984, Gregor Bühl began his conducting studies at the Robert Schumann Hochschule Düsseldorf with Wolfgang Trommer. In addition, he attended masterclasses with Ferdinand Leitner, Gary Bertini, and Hiroyuki Iwaki. Bühl has been a scholarship holder of the Deutsche Stiftung Musikleben and the DAAD.

Following a masterclass with Gerd Albrecht, Bühl subsequently was engaged as Albrecht's assistant at the Hamburg State Opera (1991–1995).

In 1993 he received the Cultural Prize of the Berenberg Bank in Hamburg, and in 1995 he was awarded Second Prize at the Nikolai Malko Conducting Competition in Copenhagen.

== Opera conductor ==
Since completing his tenure in Hamburg, Bühl has worked as a freelance conductor. Guest engagements have taken him to the Deutsche Oper Berlin, Stuttgart State Opera, the National Theatre Weimar, as well as the opera houses of Lisbon, Gothenburg, Oslo, Caracas, and Reykjavík.

His debut at the Semperoper with Giacomo Puccini's Madama Butterfly led to an immediate re-invitation for concert performances of the rarely performed Strauss version of Wolfgang Amadeus Mozart's Idomeneo.

Bühl maintains a close relationship with the Royal Opera (Stockholm), where he conducted the new production of Wagner's Ring. The final installment premiered with Götterdämmerung on 15 September 2007. The production was recorded by Swedish television and released on DVD. From January 2008 onwards, four complete Ring cycles followed. The collaboration continued in November 2008 with Tristan und Isolde.

In the following years, he made regular guest appearances at the aforementioned and other major opera houses. He has maintained an ongoing collaboration with the Staatstheater Hannover, where he conducted several new productions, including the German premiere of Manfred Trojahn's opera Orest and a production of Giuseppe Verdi's La traviata.

In 2009, Bühl made his North American debut at the Canadian Opera Company in Toronto with Beethoven's Fidelio. His South American debut followed at the Teatro Colón in Buenos Aires with a production of Franz Lehár's Die lustige Witwe. Further guest engagements included appearances at the Opéra national de Montpellier.

In 2021, Bühl conducted the world premiere of the opera Electric Saint by Stewart Copeland at the Deutsches Nationaltheater Weimar.

Among the works conducted by Bühl are Madama Butterfly, Il trovatore, La Cenerentola, Rigoletto, Pique Dame, L'elisir d'amore, Les Contes d'Hoffmann, and Tosca.

== Concert conductor ==
On the concert podium, Gregor Bühl has appeared with numerous radio symphony orchestras in Germany, Austria, the Netherlands, Scandinavia, Eastern Europe, and Israel. He has also conducted the Düsseldorf Symphony Orchestra, the Staatskapelle Weimar, the Rheinland-Pfalz State Philharmonic Orchestra, the Trondheim Symphony Orchestra, and the Israel Symphony Orchestra.

== Recordings ==
The CD American Classics, recorded for Teldec with his wife Sharon Kam as soloist, was included in the German Record Critics' Award recommendation list. The CD Sharon Kam – Works for Clarinet and Orchestra, recorded with the MDR Symphony Orchestra under Bühl's direction for Berlin Classics, featuring works by Carl Maria von Weber, Felix Mendelssohn, Louis Spohr, and others, earned Sharon Kam the Echo Klassik award in 2006.

Bühl has also devoted particular attention to the concert works of Walter Braunfels. The most recent of a total of four CD recordings received the German Record Critics' Award.

== Academic career ==
From 2016 to 2022, Bühl was a professor at the Oslo Opera Academy. As of 1 April 2025, Bühl was appointed Professor of Conducting and Opera Repetition at the University of Music Franz Liszt Weimar.

== Personal life ==
Bühl has been married to the clarinetist Sharon Kam since 1994. The couple have three children and live in Hanover.
