= Matan Porat =

Israeli pianist and composer

- מתן פורת
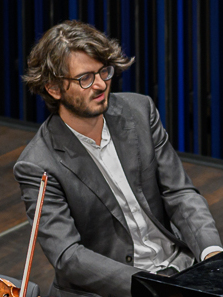
- Born: 1982 (age 43–44); Israel
- Occupations: Pianist; Composer
- Website: www.matanporat.com

Matan Porat (Hebrew: מתן פורת), is a classical pianist and composer. He was born in Tel-Aviv, Israel and lives in Berlin.

== Life ==
Porat has a master's degree from the Juilliard School in New York City. He has studied piano under Emanuel Krasovsky, Murray Perahia and Maria João Pires and composition with Ruben Seroussi and George Benjamin.

He has performed piano recitals at the Philharmonie hall in Berlin, Wigmore Hall and Barbican in London, at Carnegie Hall in New York and at the Louvre in Paris. He has played with Renaud Capuçon, Sharon Kam, Kim Kashkashian, Emmanuel Pahud, Dorothea Röschmann and Alisa Weilerstein, with the Jerusalem and Ysaye Quartets, and as a soloist with the Chicago Symphony Orchestra, Polish National Radio Symphony Orchestra, Sinfonia Varsovia, SWR Symphonieorchester, Münchener Kammerorchester, Hong Kong Sinfonietta and Jerusalem Symphony Orchestra. Porat has participated in festivals including Marlboro, Lockenhaus, Ravinia, Verbier, Heidelberger Frühling and Rheingau Festivals.

His compositions were commissioned and performed by Cuarteto Casals, Andreas Scholl, Maria João Pires, Kim Kashkashian, Avi Avital and Nicolas Altstaedt, as well as the Academy of the Deutsches Symphonie-Orchester Berlin. He has been the composer in residence at the Lockenhaus festival, festival Mizmorim in Basel, Chamberfest in Cleveland and at Intonations festival in Berlin.

Porat's playing for the silent movies The General and Metropolis at Marlboro Music in 2009 was described as "an astounding feat of creative musicianship" by Alex Ross, and as "quite sensational" by Richard Goode. The New York Times mentioned his "magnificent sound and breadth of expression" from another performance at the 92Y in New York.

== Recordings ==
Porat has released four solo Albums for the French label Mirare, "Variations on a theme by Scarlatti" (2013), "Lux" (2018), "Carnaval" (2020) and "Dances for Zoe" (2023), as well as two chamber music discs, Ives violin sonatas with Liana Gourdjia on the Printemps des arts label (2018) and "Contrasts" (2019) with Sharon and Ori Kam on the Orfeo label which won the Preis der deutschen Schallplattenkritik.
