= Chursächsische Capelle Leipzig =

German chamber orchestra

The Chursächsische Capelle Leipzig is a chamber orchestra founded in Saxony in 1994 by Anne Schumann.

== History ==
The Chursächsische Capelle Leipzig was founded in 1994 from members of the Gewandhausorchester, the Händelfestspielorchester Halle (Saale) and freelance musicians.

The musical ensemble plays on original instruments and is dedicated to musical compositions of the 17th and 18th centuries. In the style of the old Hofkapellen, the ensemble changes instrumentation depending on the programme.

The Capelle's main venue is Schönefeld Palace in Leipzig, where it can be heard at the Schönefelder Schlosskonzerte, among other events.

The Chursächsische Capelle Leipzig is a regular guest at the Bosehaus Leipzig, the Handel House and the Palais im Großen Garten, and gives concerts among others at the MDR Musiksommer, the Bachfest Leipzig, the Uckermärkischen Musikwochen, the Magdeburg Sonntagsmusiken and the Walkenrieder Kreuzgangkonzertes.

In 1996, the Chursächsische Capelle Leipzig recorded a CD chamber music of the Bach family with Ludger Rémy; in the meantime, further CD recordings are on the market.

== Recording (selection) ==
- Bach family: Kammermusik der Bach-Familie (Raumklang, 1996)
- Mitteldeutsche Barock-cantatas – Kantaten aus der Thüringer Musiksammlung Großfahner. (CPO, 2003)
- Sämtliche Werke für Nagelgeige. (Beoton, 2003)
- Johann Friedrich Fasch: Konzert am Hof zu Principality of Anhalt-Zerbst (Konzertmitschnitt zu den 10. Internationalen Faschfesttagen 2008)
