= Michael Obst (composer) =

German composer & pianist (born 1955)

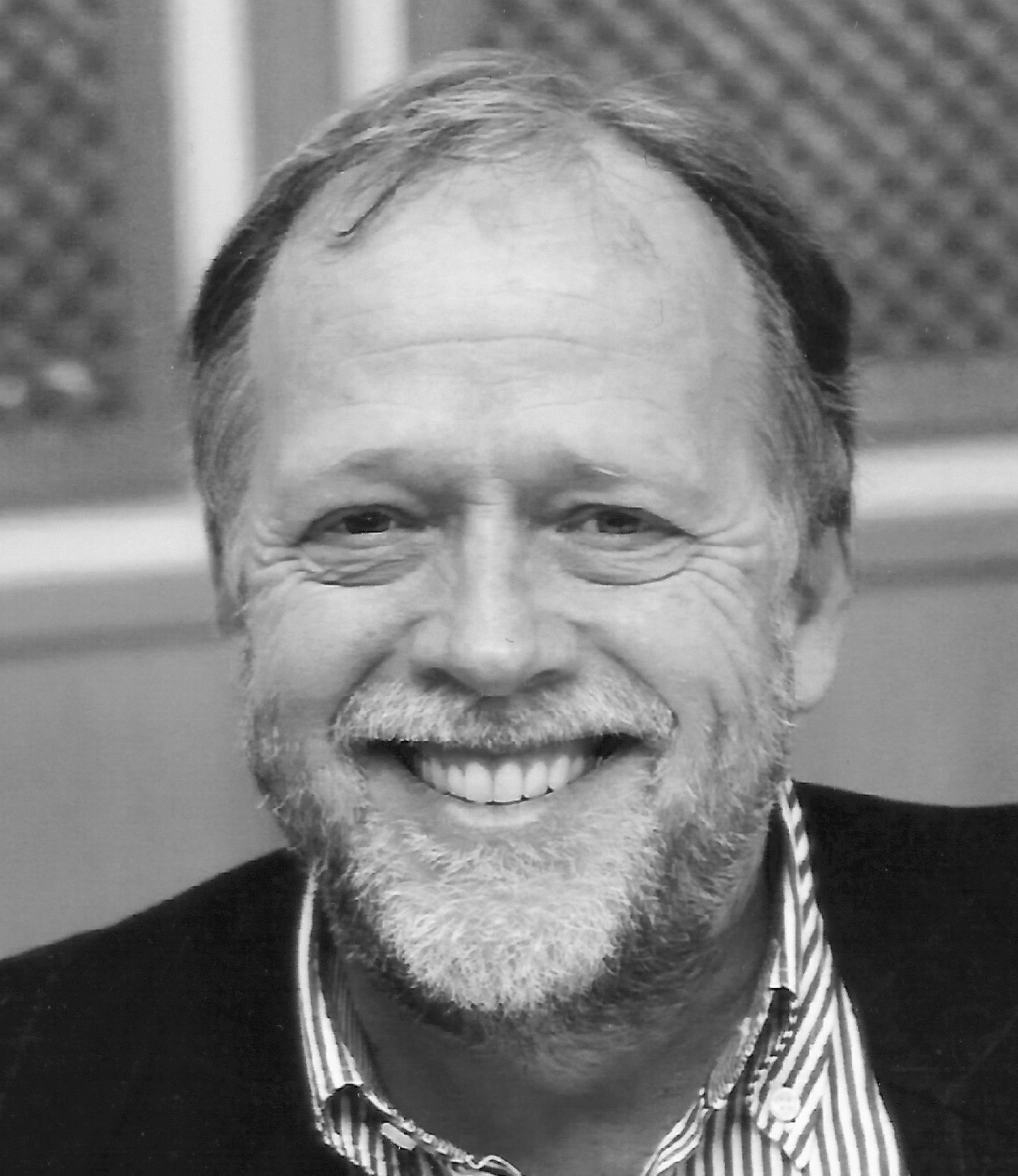
Michael Obst in 2014

Michael Obst (born 30 November 1955) is a German composer and pianist.

== Life ==
Obst was born in Frankfurt am Main. He studied music education from 1973 to 1978 in Mainz, and from 1977 to 1982 studied piano with Alfons Kontarsky and Aloys Kontarsky at the Hochschule für Musik Köln, where he sat his piano examination in 1982. At the same time, between 1979 and 1986, he studied composition with Hans Ulrich Humpert in the Studio for Elektronic Music of the Hochschule für Musik Köln. From 1981 to 1992 he was the pianist and a founding member of the Ensemble Modern, from 1986 to 1989 he worked as an interpreter with Karlheinz Stockhausen, playing synthesizer in Stockhausen's operatic cycle Licht.

He was invited to the Studios of Ghent (IPEM), Stockholm (EMS), Bourges (Groupe de musique expérimentale de Bourges), Paris (IRCAM), and Freiburg (SWF-Heinrich Strobel Stiftung) as well as to the Studio for Electronic Music of the Westdeutscher Rundfunk in Cologne. At IRCAM he realized the electronics for his chamber opera Solaris (to a libretto by Stanisław Lem); the opera received its première at the Munich Biennale in 1996. From 1997 to 2021 he has been professor of composition at the Hochschule für Musik Franz Liszt in Weimar.

From 2010 to 2013 he was a guest professor for composition at the University of Music and performing Arts in Vienna.

In works such as Solaris, Obst adopts a modernist sensibility while at the same time questioning its underlying philosophy.

== Selected World Premières and Important Performances ==
- 10 Years IRCAM Paris 1987: "Kristallwelt III" for ensemble on tape, commission IRCAM
- Donaueschinger Musiktage 1987: "Kristallwelt III" for ensemble and tape
- Donaueschinger Musiktage 1989: "Miroirs" for 6 vocalists, commission SWF
- Donaueschinger Musiktage 1995: "Diaphonia" for soloists, orchestra and live-electronics, com. SWF
- World Music Days (ISCM) Cologne 1987: "Chansons" for Mezzo-Soprano, 5 instruments, live-electronics and tape, commission WDR
- Holland-Festival Amsterdam 1990: "Kristallwelt III" for ensemble and tape
- 10 Years Ensemble Modern, Frankfurt 1990: "Nachtstücke" for 7 instr. + live-el.
- Présence '92 -jeunes compositeurs- Radio France, Paris: "Fresko" for 5 instruments, commission Radio France
- Musik-Kino Philharmonie Cologne 1992: "Dr. Mabuse Part I", music for the silent movie by Fritz Lang for ensemble, commission Philharmonie Cologne
- CineMémoire, Paris 1993: "Dr. Mabuse Parts I+II", for ensemble and live-electronics, commission [part II] IRCAM/EIC
- Munich Biennale 1996: "Solaris" (première), chamber-opera, co-production with IRCAM/Paris and Munich, commission GEMA-Stiftung Munich
- Musik-Triennale 1997 Cologne: "Shadow of a Doubt" for solo percussion and ensemble, commission Philharmonie Cologne
- European Cultural City 1999 – Weimar: "Caroline", opera, commission German National Theater Weimar
- Le Merveilleuse Festival 2003, Cité de la Musique, Paris: "Nosferatu" (Murnau), music for the silent movie for ensemble, commission Ensemble InterContemporain
- Gewandhaus Leipzig 2006: "Espaces sonores" (première) for Wind Quintett and Orchestra, commission from the Radio/TV – Orchestra Leipzig (MDR)
- MainFranken Theater Würzburg 2010: "Die andere Seite" (Kubin) (première), commission from the MainFranken Theater Würzburg
- Bayerische Theaterakademie "August Everding" 2013, "Solaris" Chamber Opera, Stage Direction: Kovalik Balázs
- Festival cresc...Biennale für moderne Musik, Frankfurt 2013, "Die Befristeten", concertante radio play after the theatre piece of the same name by Elias Canetti
- Landestheater Linz, 17 September 2016, Austrian première "Solaris", MD: Daniel Linton-France, SD: Hermann Schneider
- Landestheater Linz, 21 May 2017, Austrian première "Die andere Seite", MD: Dennis Russel Davies, SD: John Dew

== Discography ==
- METAL DROPS, Inside–metal drop music–Ye–Na–Je, electroacoustic music, CD Wergo WER SM 1043–2
- CRYSTAL WORLD, Crystal World I–III, electroacoustic music, CD Wergo WER 2011–50
- MICHAEL OBST, Kristallwelt III–Fresko–Nachtstücke, EIC/IRCAM, CD Adès 205832
- Diaphonia, SWF–Sinfonieorchester/Gielen, Donaueschingen 1995, CD col legno WWE 31898
- Fábrica, electroacoustic music, composers of Nordrhein Westfalen (Germany), CD Koch–Schwann 3–5037–3
- Oktett für Bläserensemble, Bläserensemble Sabine Meyer, EMI Records 7243-5-57084-2-7
- Trio No 2 for Violin, Violoncello and Piano, Abegg Trio, TACET Records 174

== Television Productions ==
- DR MABUSE, DER SPIELER Ensemble InterContemporain – Ann Manson, ZDF-ARTE 1996
- SOLARIS Biennale München-Xsemble München – Musical Director: Peter Rundel Stage Director: Anja Sündermann, Bayerischer Rundfunk 1996

== Compositions ==
=== Stage works ===
World Première	Title	Description	Libretto and source
4 December 1996, Muffathalle/ Munich Biennale	Solaris	Chamber opera in 3 parts with an overture and an intermezzo, 90'	the composer, after the novel by Stanislaw Lem
10 July 1999, Nationaltheater Weimar	Caroline	Opera in two parts	Ralph Günther Mohnnau after the life of Caroline Schelling
25 September 2010, Mainfranken Theater Würzburg	Die andere Seite	Opera	Hermann Schneider, after the novel The Other Side by Alfred Kubin
21 May 2022 Landestheater Linz (Austria)	Under the Glacier	Opera in three parts, a prologue and an epilogue	Hermann Schneider, after the novel Kristnihald under Jökli by Halldór Laxness

=== Other works ===
- 1980/81 Metal Drop Music, quadraphonic electronic music
- 1980/83 Piano Piece no. 3 for piano solo
- 1981 Resonanzen 1 for violoncello solo
- 1981/88 Traumlandschaften for 2 pianos
- 1981/82 Inside, quadrophonic electronic music
- 1982 YE-NA-JE stereophonic electronic music
- 1983 Visioni di Medea, quadrophonic electronic music
- 1983–85 Crystal World I, quadrophonic electronic music
- 1984 Crystal World II (Chorale), quadrophonic electronic music
- 1985/86 Crystal World III, quadrophonic electronic music
- 1985/86 Crystal World III for ensemble and tape
- 1987 Chansons for mezzo-soprano, 5 instruments, live-electronics, and tape
- 1987 Ende Gut, quadrophonic electronic music
- 1989 Poèmes for percussion solo and tape
- 1989 Miroirs for 6 vocalists
- 1990 Dr. Mabuse Der Spieler Part I: Der große Spieler for ensemble and live-electronics (film music for the restored complete version of the silent film "Dr. Mabuse, der Spieler" by Fritz Lang)
- 1990–92 Poèmes, "d'après des images en blanc et noir" for orchestra
- 1990 Nachtstücke for 7 instruments and live-electronics
- 1991 Fresko for 5 instruments
- 1991 Nuances for flute and percussion
- 1992–93 Dr. Mabuse Der Spieler Part II: Inferno for ensemble and live-electronics (film music for the restored complete version of the silent film "Dr. Mabuse, der Spieler" by Fritz Lang)
- 1993–94 Diaphonia for soloists, orchestra and live-electronics
- 1994 Fábrica I, stereophonic electronic music
- 1995 Fábrica II for 4 percussionists and tape
- 1996 Journey's End, quadrophonic electronic music
- 1997 Shadow (...of a Doubt), for percussion and ensemble
- 1998 Traces for oboe solo
- 1998 Suite for bass clarinet, accordion and double bass
- 1998 Octet for Winds
- 1998/99 Piano Piece no. 5 for piano solo
- 1998/99 Reflections for accordion solo
- 2000 The Wind for violin, French horn and tape
- 2000 Images for violin solo
- 2000 Six Sketches for French horn solo
- 2001 Piano Trio no. 1
- 2001 Transit, for orchestra
- 2002 Nosferatu, (music for the classic silent film by Friedrich Wilhelm Murnau)
- 2003/04 Espaces Sonores, 8-track electronic music
- 2004–05 Espaces sonores, for wind quintet and orchestra
- 2006 Arcus for string quartet and electronic music
- 2006 Piano Trio no. 2
- 2009 Trois Rêves for ensemble
- 2009 Four Little Pieces for B-flat clarinet
- 2013 Die Befristeten, concertante radio play for speakers and ensemble after the theatre piece of the same name by Elias Canetti (text adaptation by Ursula Ruppel)
- 2013–14 Variazioni for two trumpets and two ensembles
- 2014 Te Deum for six-part mixed choir
- 2016 Noctuelles for 11 instruments

== Writings by Michael Obst (selection) ==
- De nouveau critère pour apprécier la musique electroacoustique in: Esthétique et Musique Electroacoustique, Paris 1996, pp. 71–76
- Neue Musik (-festival)? in: Festschrift 75 Jahre Donaueschinger Musiktage, Donaueschingen 1996, pp. 77–80
- Fábrica – analyse structurelle in: Analyse en Musique Electroacoustique, Bourges 1997, pp. 155–159
- Projection du son prise comme élément compositionnel, La fonction de l'électronique en direct dans mon opéra *Solaris in: Composition/Diffusion en Musique Electroacoustique, Bourges 1998, pp. 142–150
- La musique – pourquoi? in: Musique Electroacoustique: expérience et prospective, Bourges 1999, pp. 116–117
