= Christian Funke =

German classical violinist (born 1949)

Christian Funke (born 1949) is a German violinist, concertmaster and Professor for violin. Since 1987 he has been the conductor of the Bachorchester zu Leipzig.

== Career ==
Funke, born in Dresden in 1949, studied at the Hochschule für Musik Carl Maria von Weber from 1959 to 1966 and then continued his studies at the Moscow Conservatory with Igor Bezrodnyi.

After his Staatsexamen in 1972, he was engaged as 1st concertmaster at the Staatskapelle Dresden. Since 1979, he was 1st concertmaster of the Gewandhausorchester Leipzig. As soloist, he has played many violin concertos, among others by Tchaikovsky, Beethoven, Brahms, Mozart, Sibelius, Shostakovich and Stravinski with the Gewandhaus Orchestra.

Funke won numerous prizes in national and international competitions, including a second prize in the violin category at the 1968 edition of the International Johann Sebastian Bach Competition.

In 1986, he was appointed professor for violin at the Hochschule für Musik Franz Liszt, Weimar. He also holds an Honorary Professorship at the University of Music and Theatre Leipzig.

He has played several times Bach's Concerto for Two Violins together with Igor Oistrakh and Maxim Vengerov. Furthermore, he was able to win soloists like Sergei Nakariakov for the ensemble.

As a soloist, he is a frequent guest with renowned orchestras and chamber music evenings or at music festivals like the Walkenrieder Kreuzgangkonzerte.

Funke plays a violin from the famous Italian luthier Gagliano.

Numerous vinyl and CDs recordings are available.

== Recordings ==
- Georg Frideric Handel: Feuerwerksmusik (Deutsche Schallplatten, Berlin 1978 / 1980)
- Claude Debussy: Späte Sonaten (Deutsche Schallplatten, Berlin 1980 / 1981)
- Pyotr Ilyich Tchaikovsky: Virtuose Violinsonaten (Deutsche Schallplatten, Berlin 1983)
- Tchaikovsky: Konzert für Violine und Orchester D-Dur op. 35 (Deutsche Schallplatten, Berlin 1983)
- Robert Schumann: Violinsonate Nr. 2 d-moll op. 121 (Deutsche Schallplatten, Berlin 1985)
- Ludwig van Beethoven: Tripelkonzert (Delta Music, Frechen 1987)
- Cantabile. (Deutsche Schallplatten, Berlin 1988)
- Tchaikovsky: Konzert für Violine und Orchester D-Dur op. 35 (Magna-Tonträger, Berlin 1989)
- Franz Schubert: Traummusik Vol. 1 (Magna-Tonträger, Berlin 1990)
- Krebs – Kirnberger – Scheinpflug – Stamitz. (Pilz Media Group, 1990)
- Tchaikovsky: Konzert für Klavier und Orchester no. 1 b-Moll op. 23 (Magna-Tonträger, Berlin 1990)
- Berühmte Konzertzugaben. (Magna-Tonträger, Berlin 1992)
- Antonio Vivaldi: Le quattro stagioni (Image Concert, Herzberg / Harz 1994)
- Robert Schumann: Sonaten für Violine und Klavier Nr. 1 & 2 (Edel, Hamburg 1996)
- Virtuose Violinsonaten. (Edel, Hamburg 1997)
- Tchaikovsky: Konzert für Violine und Orchester D-Dur (Edel, Hamburg 1998)
- Cantabile. (Edel, Hamburg 1998)
- Claude Debussy: Kammermusik (Edel, Hamburg 1999)
- Tchaikovsky: Konzert für Violine und Orchester D-Dur (Edel, Hamburg 2003)
- After work hour / 4. (Edel, Hamburg 2004)
- Tchaikovsky: Romeo und Julia (Edel Germany, Berlin 2006)
- Moments of peace. (Edel Classics, Hamburg 2007)
- Gute Nacht, schlafe sacht. (Edel Entertainment, Hamburg 2012)
- Tchaikovsky: Konzert für Violine und Orchester D-Dur op. 35. (DNB, Leipzig/Frankfurt, 2018)
