= Salonorchester Cappuccino =

German musical ensemble

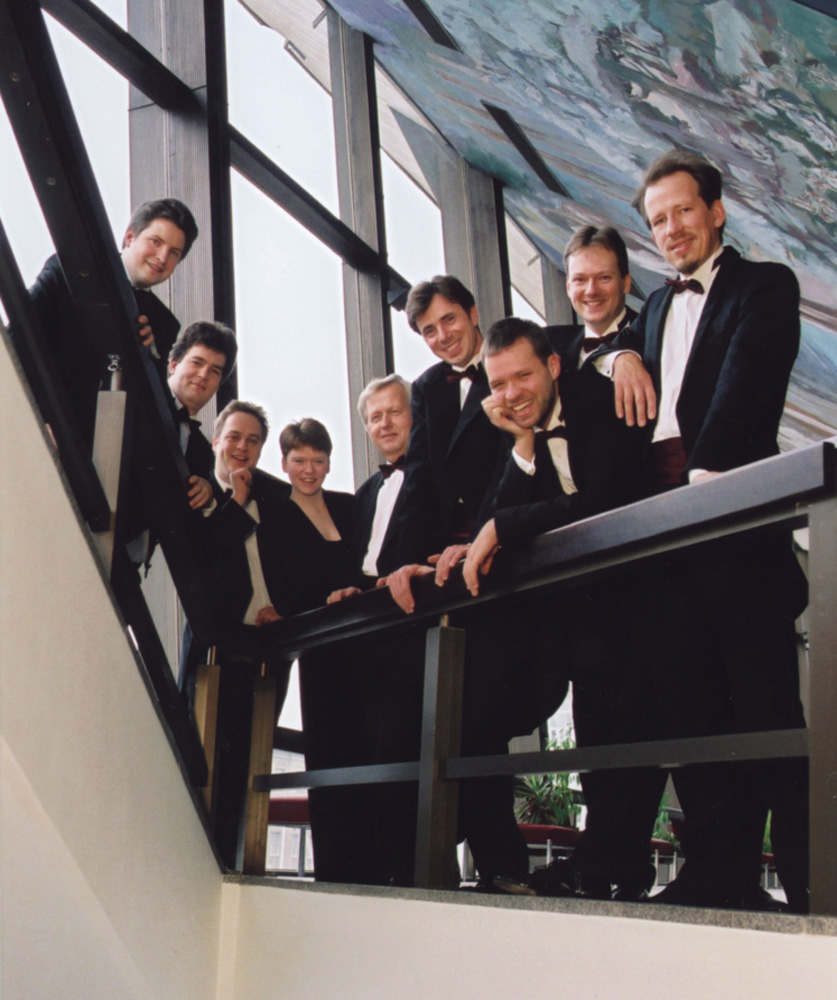
The Salonorchester Cappuccino in Gewandhaus Leipzig

The Salonorchester Cappuccino is an ensemble founded in Leipzig in 1989 and dedicated to the cultivation of salon music as a form of upmarket light music.

== History ==
In 1989, some students at the University of Music and Theatre Leipzig got together to make music at a party. Their common fondness for salon and coffeehouse music kept them together longer, and together with one of their teachers they founded an ensemble dedicated to this genre. Because of the reference to the coffee house, they chose the name "Salonorchester Cappuccino". Its leader is the violinist Albrecht Winter.

After initially sporadic performances at private parties, public concerts soon followed and finally, from 1995, a regular concert series under the title "Das gibt's nur einmal" (There's only one time for that), named after the film hit by Werner Richard Heymann, which is heard at the end of each of these concerts. Initially, the concerts took place in the Alte Handelsbörse in Leipzig. Due to a lack of space, it became necessary to move to the Mendelssohn Hall of the Gewandhaus in 1999. In the meantime, the concert series, with six concerts per season, has become an integral part of the subscription programme of the Gewandhaus Leipzig. It had to be extended to two dates per concert due to strong demand.

In the meantime, most of the students of that period are in various orchestras or teach at music colleges. However, they like to get together for the Leipzig concerts or for concert tours, such as to classical music festivals in the summer of 2009 to the Mozart Festival Würzburg, the Ludwigsburger Schlossfestspiele and to the Altenburg music festival as well as to the Walkenrieder Kreuzgangkonzerte.

== Repertoire ==
The repertoire of the Salonorchester Cappuccino is very versatile. It includes not only the popular melodies of the Viennese operettas or the German film hits as well as the character pieces of coffee house music. On the one hand, it ranges from less frequently played arrangements of "serious classic and opera cross-sections to more swinging rhythms of American-influenced dance music of the 1920s, from musicals to titles of the entertainment orchestras after the Second World War. Vocal interludes by the leader are also included from time to time.

The concerts, especially those in the "Das gibt's nur einmal" series, each have a specific theme. Geographical regions, seasons, anniversaries and many other occasions and circumstances can determine the selection. Composer portraits are offered under the title "Zum Fünf-Uhr-Tee bei ...". However, not only pieces by the reference person are played, but also references to predecessors and contemporaries are made. Repetitions of titles from earlier concerts do not occur.

A trademark of the "Cappuccino Concerts", however, is especially the informative, witty and entertaining conferences by Albrecht Winter.

== Line-up ==
1. Violin and direction:	Albrecht Winter (Professor at the Hochschule für Musik und Tanz Köln)
2. Violin:	Eva Heinig (Orchester der Musikalische Komödie Leipzig)
Violoncello:	Hartmut Becker (freelance)
Double bass:	Felix Raddatz (Thüringen Philharmonie Gotha-Eisenach) / Claus-Peter Nebelung (Staatskapelle Halle)
Flute / Saxophon:	Thomas Reimann (Musikalische Komödie)
Oboe:	Pavel Kondakov (Hofer Symphoniker) / Klaus-Peter Voß (Staatskapelle Halle)
Clarinet:	Marco Thomas (Professor at the University of the Arts Bremen) / Jan Doormann Deutsches Nationaltheater und Staatskapelle Weimar
Trombone:	Tobias Hasselt (Leipzig Gewandhaus Orchestra)
Piano:	Horst Singer (Professor at the University of Music and Theatre Leipzig)

(as of March 2021)

== Recording ==
- 1998: Das gibt’s nur einmal
- 2003: Grüß mir mein Wien (with Regina Werner-Dietrich, singing)
- 2009: Wieso ist der Walter so klug für sein Alter
