= Anne Schumann =

German violinist

- Born: 1966 (age 59–60); Dohna, East Germany
- Education: Spezialschule für Musik Weimar; Hochschule für Musik Franz Liszt, Weimar
- Alma mater: Hochschule für Musik Carl Maria von Weber Dresden
- Occupation: Violinist
- Known for: Founder of the Chursächsische Capelle Leipzig orchestra
- Awards: Fasch prize of the city of Zerbst

Anne Schumann (born in 1966) is a German violinist and docent in Baroque music.

== Career ==
Schumann was born in Dohna. She received her first violin lessons at the age of five with Sabine Harazim and later with Hartmut Opolka. In 1974 she had her first public performance in Handel House in Halle an der Saale. From 1979 she was an external student at the Spezialschule für Musik Weimar and from 1982 to 1984 she was also in the boarding school there.

In 1984 she began studying music at the Hochschule für Musik Franz Liszt, Weimar. In May/June 1985 she went on a concert tour with a specially composed youth symphony orchestra to Hungary, Czechoslovakia, Poland, Bulgaria, the GDR and the Soviet Union. In 1985 she changed to the Hochschule für Musik Carl Maria von Weber Dresden in the class of Heinz Rudolf.

In 1988 she dealt with historical instruments for the first time. In 1989 she played in the Gustav Mahler Jugendorchester under Claudio Abbado and became a member of the Gewandhaus orchestra in Leipzig.

Since 1993 Schumann has played as a freelance baroque violinist, primarily in England with the English Baroque Soloists and the Orchestre Revolutionaire et Romantique.

In 1994 she founded her own Ensemble in Leipzig, the Chursächsische Capelle Leipzig, which is especially dedicated to the performance of forgotten chamber music works. For several years (1992, 1993, 1995, 1996 and 1998) she was concertmaster in the European Union Baroque Orchestra. Besides her occupation with historical violins and violas, she likes to work on new repertoires for the viola d'amore.

Since 2002 she also teaches at summer courses and workshops, e.g. at the Academy for ancient music in Bruneck, at the International Summer Course in the Michaelstein Abbey in Blankenburg (Harz) and at Musica viva Musikferien in Tuscany.

She also works with many ensembles in projects including Händelfestspielorchester Halle, Chursächsische Capelle Leipzig, English Baroque Soloists, Orchestre Révolutionaire et Romantique, Les Amis de Philippe, Telemann-Kammerorchester Michaelstein, La Cesta, Musicalische Schlemmerey and Fürsten-Musik.

Schumann plays on a Baroque violin and viola d'amore, and has recorded numerous Compact Discs.

== Prizes and awards ==
2019: Fasch prize of the city of Zerbst

== Discography ==
- Georg Philipp Telemann: Tafelmusik für Naxos mit dem "Orchestra of the Golden Age" (Manchester, 1995)
- William Lawes: Royall Consorts with Monika Huggett in the Ensemble "The Greate Consort" (ASV London, 1995/96)
- Georg Friedrich Handel: Cantate d'amore – italienische Liebeskantaten (Delta Music, 1996)
- Johann Sebastian Bach: Bach Cantata Pilgrimage (Soli Deo Gloria, 2000)
- Johann Gottlieb Graun: Trio sonatas with Forte piano (cpo, 2006)
- Philipp Heinrich Erlebach: Cantatas by Erlebach (cpo, 2007)
- Johann Friedrich Fasch: Fasch Concerti (cpo, 2008)
- Musik für Viola d'amore (Genuin, 2010)
- Antonio Bertali: Le Concert Brisé (Accent, 2012)
- Heinrich Ignaz Franz Biber: Rosenkranzsonaten I. (Kamprad, 2015)

== DVD ==
- DVD Barockmusik mit Bildern von Petra Iversen (2012)
