= Albrecht Winter =

German classical violinist

Albrecht Winter (born 14 June 1970) is a German violinist, Kapellmeister and academic teacher.

== Life and career ==
Born in Rüdersdorf bei Berlin, Winter comes from a family of cantors, in which the Protestant church music tradition and music-making at home shaped him from an early age. After attending a special music school, he studied violin with Klaus Hertel at the University of Music and Theatre Leipzig from 1988 to 1993. During his studies, he won a prize at the International Johann Sebastian Bach Competition in 1992. From 1996 to 1997, he taught for one and a half years as an assistant at the Leipzig Hochschule.

From 1997, Winter was concertmaster of the 2nd violins in the Leipzig Gewandhaus Orchestra for six years. Since 2003 he has held a professorship for violin and didactics at the Wuppertal department of the Musikhochschule Köln.

Already during their studies in Leipzig, some music (not singing!) and theology students with a penchant for early music got together and formed the vocal ensemble "Collegium Canticorum", of which Winter is still the 2nd bass today. Rehearsal weekends and summer concerts with a now expanded repertoire bring them together from all parts of Germany.

In 1989, some students at Leipzig University discovered their love of salon music. Together with one of their teachers, they founded the Salonorchester Cappuccino, whose violin soloist and director is Albrecht Winter and which can now look back on a thirty-year tradition. The repertoire of the musicians, who now belong to various orchestras, presented in theme concerts ranges from arrangements of classical music to swinging film hits. The entitlement concerts of the Salonorchester Cappuccino have been an integral part of the concert programme of the Gewandhaus. A hallmark of Winter's concerts is its informative, witty and entertaining conferences.

From 2004 to 2013, Winter was artistic director of the Leipziger Neues Bachisches Collegium Musicum. There, in addition to Bach's secular music, he focused on that of his predecessors and reconstructed the historic Gewandhaus concerts of the 18th century.
