= Sharon Kam =

Israeli-German clarinetist (born 1971)

Sharon Kam שרון קם
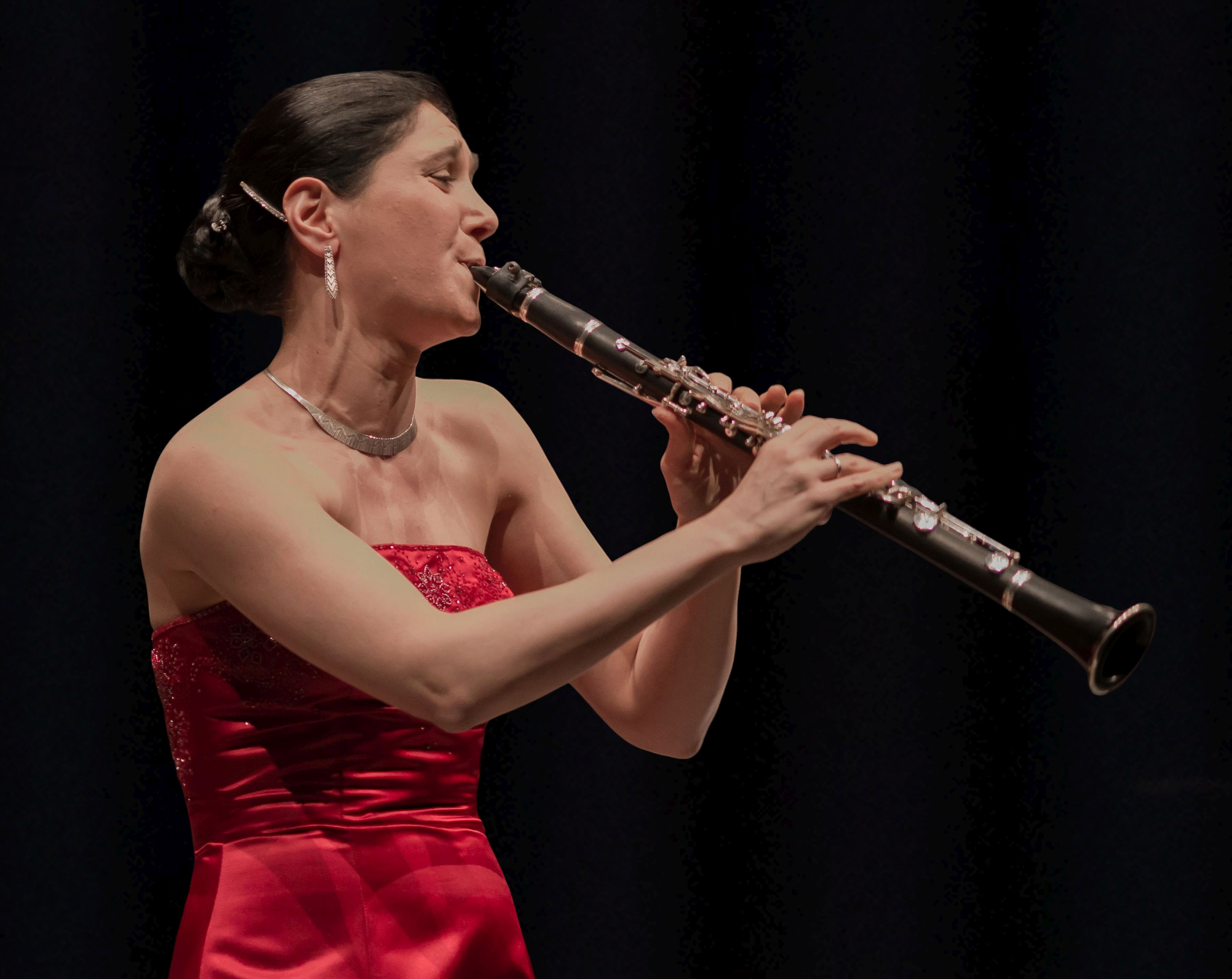

Background information
- Born: August 11, 1971 (age 54); Haifa, Israel
- Genres: Classical music, contemporary music
- Occupation: Solo clarinetist
- Instruments: Clarinet and basset clarinet (French system)
- Years active: 1987–present
- Labels: Berlin Classics, Orfeo
- Website: sharonkam.com
- Career
- Education: Juilliard School of Music by Charles Neidich
- Agent(s): Impresariat Simmenauer GmbH, Berlin; Press: Hasko Witte, Büro für Künstler, Hamburg
- Known for: Numerous CDs, one DVD, several YouTube videos, sound recordings also on Spotify and Deezer
- Awards: Various awards, 1992–2006
- Personal
- Spouse(s): Gregor Bühl, conductor
- Children: 3 children Residence: Hannover, Germany

Sharon Kam (Hebrew: שרון קם; born August 11, 1971) is an Israeli–German clarinetist who performs internationally as a soloist. She won the ARD International Music Competition in 1992. Since October 2022, she has also been Professor for Clarinet at the Hochschule für Musik, Theater und Medien Hannover.

== Biography ==
Sharon Kam started playing the piano at the age of 5, then the recorder at the age of 7, which she played until she was 15. She began playing the clarinet at the age of 12 and received a scholarship from the Jewish-American Cultural Society after just one year. From 1989, she studied for four years on a full scholarship at the Juilliard School of Music in New York, one year with David Shifrin and then with Charles Neidich.

In 1987, Kam performed as a soloist with the Israel Philharmonic Orchestra in Mozart's Clarinet Concerto under the direction of Zubin Mehta, who then invited her to tour with the orchestra in Canada. In 1990, she was the soloist in a joint historic concert by the Israel Philharmonic Orchestra and the Berlin Philharmonic to celebrate the fall of the Berlin Wall.

In 1992, she won the ARD International Music Competition (second prize, the first was not awarded), followed a year later by the Davidoff Prix. In 1998 she received the ECHO Klassik Prize as "Instrumentalist of the Year" for her CD recording of the Weber concertos with the Gewandhaus Orchestra conducted by Kurt Masur. In 2006, she was again awarded for her CD with the MDR Leipzig Radio Symphony Orchestra featuring works by Spohr, Weber, Rossini and Mendelssohn. Her 2002 CD "American Classics" with the London Symphony Orchestra under the direction of Gregor Bühl was awarded the German Record Critics' Prize.

Kam's interpretation of the Mozart concerto as part of Mozart's 250th anniversary in 2006 at the Prague National Theater was broadcast live on television in 33 countries and is available on DVD. The same year, she realized her dream of recording Mozart's clarinet concerto and quintet, playing the basset clarinet.

Kam has given concertos worldwide with major orchestras such as the Chicago Symphony Orchestra, the Berlin Philharmonic, the Israel Philharmonic Orchestra, London Symphony Orchestra, and Leipzig Gewandhaus Orchestra. She was "Artist in Residence" at the Bodensee Festival in 2011.

Kam is also active in the field of chamber music and works regularly with artists such as Lars Vogt, Christian Tetzlaff, Daniel Müller-Schott, Enrico Pace, Leif Ove Andsnes, Liza Ferschtman, Antje Weithaas, Julian Steckel and the Schumann Quartet. Sharon Kam is a frequent guest at a number of festivals. She was curator of the Dvořák Festival in Prague in 2018 and is Artist in Residence at the Tonhalle Düsseldorf in the 2024/2025 season.

In the realm of contemporary music, she has premiered many works, including Krzysztof Penderecki's concerto and quartet, as well as concertos by Herbert Willi (at the Salzburg Festival), Iván Erőd and Peter Ruzicka (in Donaueschingen).

Kam married the conductor Gregor Bühl in 1994, has three children and lives with her family in Hanover.

Kam plays on Buffet Crampon clarinets.

== Prizes and awards ==
- 1992: 2nd prize at the ARD International Music Competition (The 1st prize was not awarded.)
- 1993: Prix Davidoff
- 1998: ECHO-Klassik award as ‘Instrumentalist of the Year’ for her CD recording of the Carl Maria von Weber concertos with the Gewandhausorchester under Kurt Masur
- 2002: Preis der deutschen Schallplattenkritik for ‘American Classics’ with the London Symphony Orchestra under the direction of Gregor Bühl
- 2006: ECHO Klassik Award as 'Instrumentalist of the Year'
- 2022: Opus Klassik in the category chamber music recording with Hindemith: ‘’Works for clarinet‘’

== Selected recordings ==
- The Romantic Clarinet (Rietz: Klarinettenkonzert op. 29, Bruch: Konzert für Klarinette, Viola & Orchester op. 88, Weber: Klarinettenquintett op. 34 arr. für Streichorchester) 2007.
- Mozart Gala From Prague / Clarinet Concerto (Don Giovanni: Overture, K.527, Concerto for Clarinet and Orchestra in A major, K.622, Symphony No.38 in D major, K.504 "Prague") 2006.
- Works for Clarinet and Orchestra (Mendelssohn: Two Concert pieces for Clarinet, basset-horn and Orchestra, op. 113 and op.114, Spohr: Concerto Nr. 4 in e minor, Weber: Concertino op. 26, Rossini: Introduction, Theme and Variations) 2005.
- Sharon Kam – Artist Portrait 2003.
- American Classics (Copland: Concerto for clarinet, Bernstein: Prelude, Fugue and Riffs, Gould: Derivations for clarinet and Band, Shaw: Concerto for clarinet, Gershwin: Summertime, They All Laughed, The Man I Love, I Got Rhythm) 2002.
- Brahms: Clarinet Quintet, String Quartet No. 2. With the Jerusalem Quartet (Harmonia Mundi; 2013)
- Brahms, Reger: Clarinet Quintets. With Isabelle van Keulen, Ulrike-Anima Mathé, Volker Jacobsen, Gustav Rivinius (Berlin Classics; 2015)
- Sharon Kam: Portrait. Virtuoso clarinet music. (Berlin Classics; 2016)
- Contrasts. Works by Mozart, Schumann, Brahms, Bartók, Rechtman. With Ori Kam, viola; Matan Porat, piano (Orfeo; 2019)
- Sharon Kam. concertos for clarinet and orchestra by Weber, Kurpinski, Crusell. ORF Radio Symphony Orchestra, conductor: Gregor Bühl (Orfeo)
- Hindemith - Clarinet Concerto ∙ Clarinet Quartet ∙ Sonata, with Antje Weithaas (Violin), Julian Steckel (Violoncello), Enrico Pace (Piano) and the Frankfurt Radio Symphony Orchestra under Daniel Cohen (Orfeo; 2021)
