= Orest =

Orest is a masculine given name. Notable people with the name include:

- Orest Banach (born 1948), German-American former soccer goalkeeper
- Orest Budyuk (born 1995), Ukrainian footballer
- Orest Grechka (born 1975), Ukrainian-American former soccer player
- Orest Kärm (1902–1944), Soviet Estonian politician
- Orest Khvolson (1852–1932), Russian physicist
- Orest Kindrachuk (born 1950), Canadian former National Hockey League player
- Orest Kiprensky (1782–1836), Russian portrait painter
- Orest Klympush (born 1941), Ukrainian engineer and politician
- Orest Kostyk (born 1999), Ukrainian football goalkeeper
- Dmytro Kozatskyi, Ukrainian soldier with the call sign "Orest"
- Orest Kryvoruchko (1942–2021), Ukrainian artist
- Orest Kuzyk (born 1995), Ukrainian footballer
- Orest V. Maresca (1914–2000), American politician
- Orest Meleschuk (born 1940), Canadian former curler
- Orest Lebedenko (born 1998), Ukrainian footballer
- Orest Lenczyk (born 1942), Polish football manager and former player
- Orest Levytsky (1848–1922), Ukrainian historian, ethnographer and writer
- Orest Onofrei (born 1957), Romanian politician
- Orest Panchyshyn (born 2000), Ukrainian footballer
- Orest Somov (1793–1833), Russian writer, critic, editor and publisher
- Orest Subtelny (1941–2016), Ukrainian-Canadian historian
- Orest Tereshchuk (born 1981), Ukrainian former tennis player
- Orest Zerebko (1887–1943), Galician-born Canadian journalist and politician
