= Abegg Trio =

German piano trio

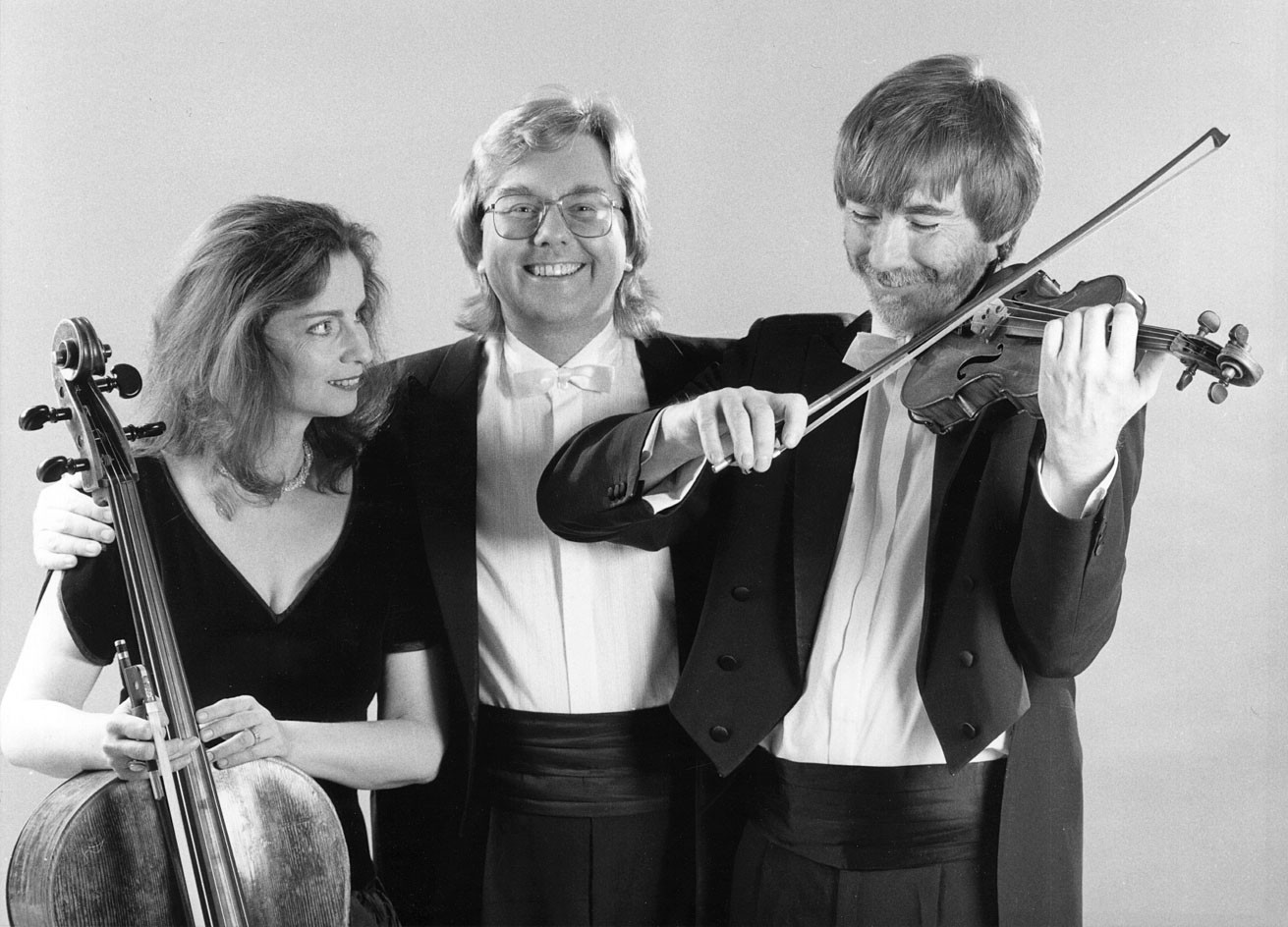
The Abegg Trio 1990

The Abegg Trio was a German piano trio. Since its foundation in 1976, it played in the original line-up.

In 2017 the ensemble disbanded after its 41st birthday.

== History ==
The Abegg Trio was founded in 1976 at the Hochschule für Musik und Theater Hannover. In 1977 it received awards at the International Chamber Music Competition Colmar and the Geneva International Music Competition, in 1979 at the German Music Competition in Bonn, in 1981 in Bordeaux, in 1986 the Bernhard-Sprengel-Prize in Hannover and in 1992 the Robert Schumann Prize of the City of Zwickau. The ensemble's name refers to Robert Schumann's first published composition the Variations on the name "Abegg" as a tribute to him.

The ensemble has made concert tours to 50 countries in Europe, North and South America, Asia, Australia and Africa and has appeared at the Schubertiade Vorarlberg, the Rheingau- and the Schleswig-Holstein Musik Festival, the Ludwigsburg Festival, the Vienna Musiksommer, the Styriarte Graz, the Bregenzer Festspiele, the Braunwald Music Weeks, the Engadin Concert Weeks, the Janáček-Festival Ostrava, the Mozart Festival Würzburg, the Heidelberg Mozart Festival Weeks, the Lower Saxony Music Days, the Kassel Music Days and the Walkenrieder Kreuzgangkonzerte.

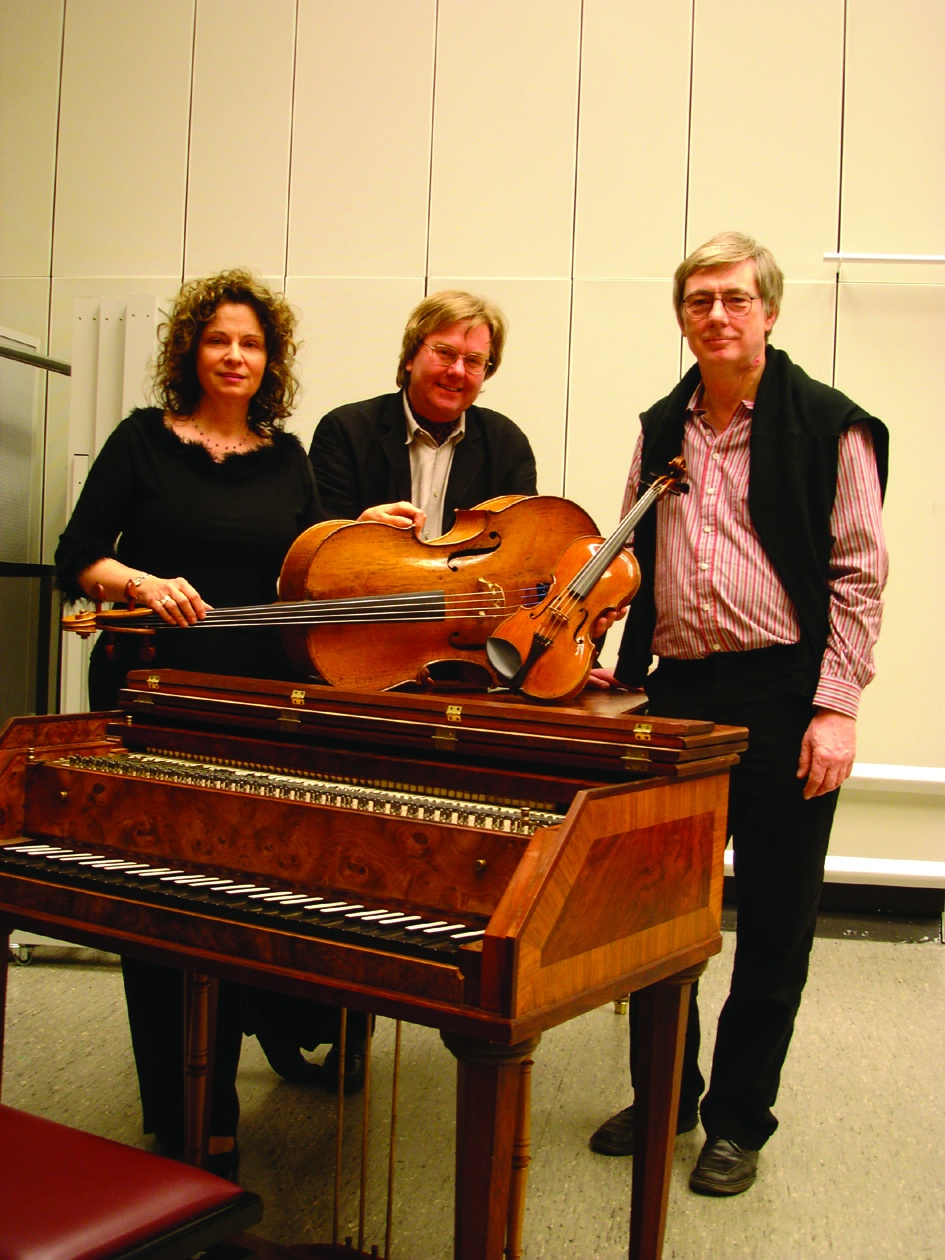
The Abegg Trio in 2006

Since 1982 the Abegg Trio has released 30 recordings on Harmonia mundi, Intercord, EMI and Tacet. Besides works by Haydn, Louise Farrenc, Clara Schumann, Fanny Hensel, Chopin, Berwald, Kiel, Goetz, Smetana, Tchaikovsky, Rachmaninoff, Janáček, Debussy, Ravel, Henze, Acker, Killmayer, Rihm and Erdmann lie the complete cycles of the piano trios by Mozart, Beethoven, Schubert, Mendelssohn, Gade, Schumann, Brahms, Dvořák and Shostakovich.

Recordings with trios by Beethoven, Fanny and Felix Mendelssohn, Smetana, Janáček, Debussy and Ravel were five times awarded at the Preis der deutschen Schallplattenkritik, CDs were chosen as reference recordings (stereoplay: Mozart, classics today USA: Beethoven, Schubert, Chopin, Brahms and Dvořák), in Klassik heute the second Dvořák CD became "Klassik-Tipp des Monats", Audio chose the Brahms recording as "CD of the Month", in the Neue Musikzeitung the Haydn CD appeared on the "Top List of the Year 1993", in the highscore list of the Süddeutsche Zeitung Joachim Kaiser rated the first Schubert CD as his "record of the year", the second Schubert CD was awarded stereoplay "Audiophile CD-Tip of the Month".

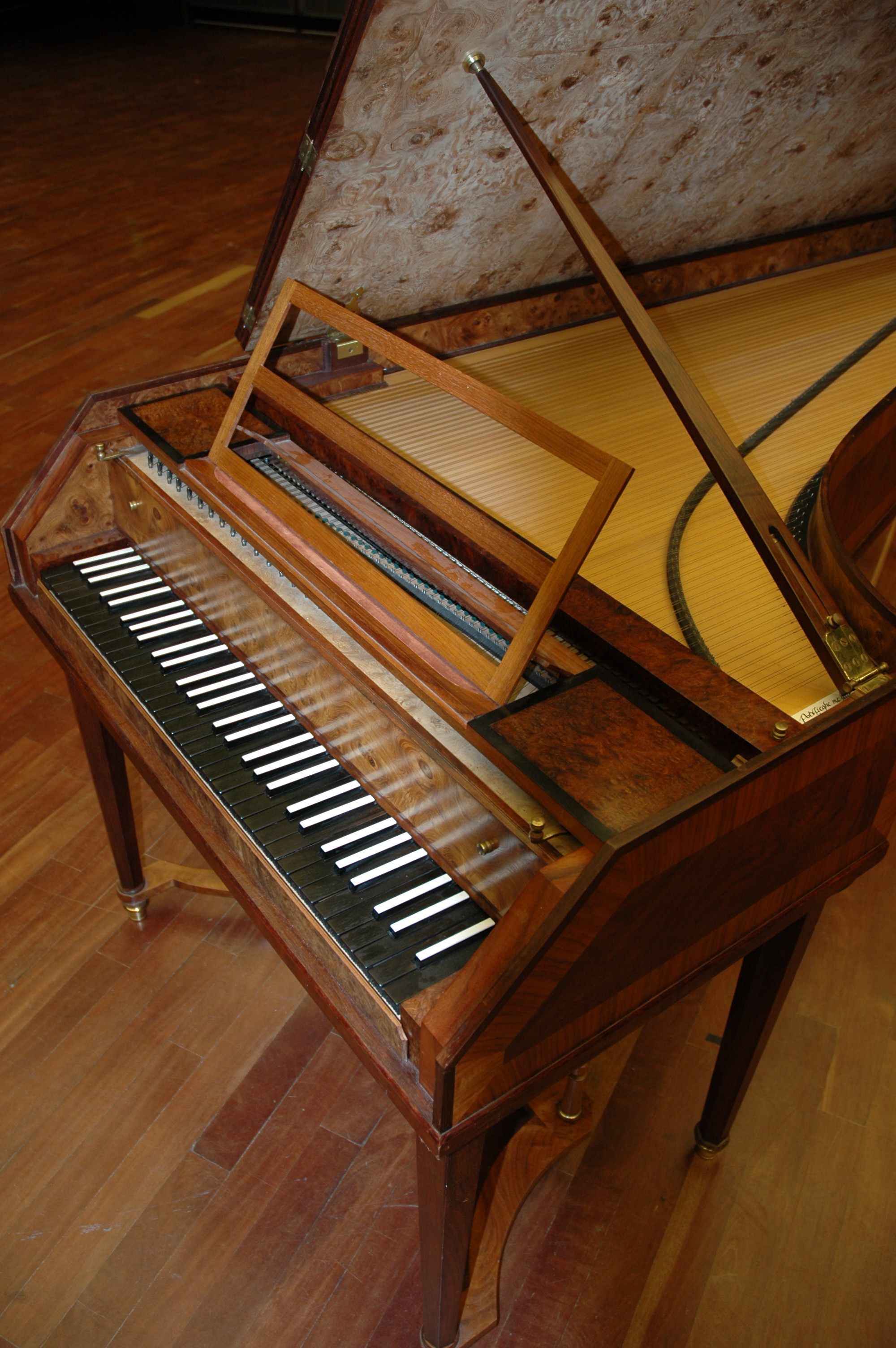
Tangent piano based on historical models by Dierik Potvlieghe

The Abegg Trio also played concerts on historical instruments. Works by Haydn, Mozart, Kraus, Beethoven, Schubert, Donizetti, Mendelssohn and Brahms have been performed. The strings play original instruments with gut strings (violins by F. Antonius Luppo 1729 and by Nicolas Lupot 1821, cellos by J. Baptist Salomon 1756 and by Andrea Castagneri 1747), the pianist used various fortepianos, (originals and copies) according to the time of origin of the works. These new experiences were also documented on some CDs: Works by Mozart (piano trios KV 10 - 15, Divertimento KV 254) were recorded with a Silbermann-fortepiano replica of a 1749 Silbermann and a tangent piano, works by Johannes Brahms (piano trios A major Op. posth., G major Op. 36 after the sextet, horn trio Op. 40, clarinet trio Op. 114) were recorded with original grand pianos by Johann Baptist Streicher. The Abegg Trio performed the piano trios by Haydn played with an original of John Broadwood (1808).

In addition to their concert activities, the three musicians taught at the music academies in Münster and Hannover. Together, the Abegg Trio passed on their experience in international master classes.

The Abegg Trio dissolved at the end of 2017.

From 1976 to 2017 it performed over 40 years in the original line-up, a very rare case of continuity in a chamber music ensemble.

== Members ==
- Ulrich Beetz (violin)
- Birgit Erichson (cello)
- Gerrit Zitterbart (piano)

== Discography ==
- Joseph Haydn: Klaviertrios G-Dur, C-Dur, Es-Dur, es-Moll (modern), A-Dur, d-Moll, E-Dur (historisch), Quintett mit 2 Hörnern (historisch)
- Wolfgang Amadeus Mozart: Sämtliche Klaviertrios KV 10, 11, 12, 13, 14, 15, 254 (historisch), 254, 442, 496, 502, 542, 548, 564 (modern)
- Ludwig van Beethoven: Sämtliche Klaviertrios op. 1, 1–3, op. 70, 1–2, op. 97, op. 44, op. 121a, WoO 38, WoO 39, Hess 48
- Franz Schubert: Sämtliche Klaviertrios op. 99, op. 100 (zwei Versionen), op. post. und andere
- Frédéric Chopin: Klaviertrio op. 8
- Felix Mendelssohn Bartholdy: sämtliche Klaviertrios op. 49, op. 66
- Fanny Hensel: Klaviertrio op. 11
- Robert Schumann: Sämtliche Klaviertrios op. 63, op. 80, op. 88, op. 110, u. a.
- Clara Schumann: Klaviertrio op. 17
- Johannes Brahms: Sämtliche Klaviertrios op. 8 (1853, 1889), op. 87, op. 101 (modern), op. 40, op. 114, op .posth., op. 36 (historisch)
- Hermann Goetz: Klaviertrio op. 1
- Franz Berwald: Klaviertrio d-Moll
- Friedrich Kiel: Klaviertrio op. 34
- Louise Farrenc: Klaviertrio op. 34
- Niels Wilhelm Gade: Sämtliche Klaviertrios op. 29, op. 42
- Bedřich Smetana: Klaviertrio op. 15
- Antonín Dvořák: sämtliche Klaviertrios op. 21, op. 26, op. 65, op. 90
- Leoš Janáček: Klaviertrio „Kreutzer-Sonate“
- Pjotr Tschaikowski: Klaviertrio op. 50
- Sergei Rachmaninoff: Klaviertrio g-Moll
- Claude Debussy: Klaviertrio G-Dur
- Maurice Ravel: Klaviertrio a-Moll
- Dmitri Shostakovich: sämtliche Klaviertrios op. 8, op. 67
- Hans Werner Henze: Klaviertrio Kammersonate
- Dieter Acker: Klaviertrio Stigmen
- Wilhelm Killmayer: Klaviertrio Brahmsbildnis
- Dietrich Erdmann: Klaviertrio
- Wolfgang Rihm: Klaviertrio Fremde Szene II
- Michael Obst: Klaviertrio Nr. II
