= Jörg Faßmann =

German violinist and music educator

Jörg Faßmann (born 1966) is a German violinist and academic teacher for music.

== Career ==
Born in Dessau, Faßmann received his first violin lessons at the age of five. He won prizes in various competitions for young people and made his debut as a soloist with orchestra at the age of nine.

He studied at the University of Music and Theatre Leipzig with Klaus Hertel and in the master class of Gustav Schmahl at the Hochschule für Musik Carl Maria von Weber Dresden. In 1987, he joined the Staatskapelle Dresden and became its deputy conductor in 1989 as 1st concertmaster.

Since 1992, he has held a lectureship at the Hochschule für Musik Carl Maria von Weber Dresden and was appointed professor in 2011. In addition, he is in great demand as a soloist and chamber music partner in Europe, the US and Japan and has conducted master classes in Spain, Germany and the US.

He was co-founder of the Dresden String Trio in 1995, which has since developed a broad repertoire, extensive CD- and radio recordings and has been a guest at festivals like for example the Rheingau Musik Festival, the MDR Musiksommer and the Walkenrieder Kreuzgangkonzerte.

In addition, he is the 1st violinist of the 2005 founded Ensemble Frauenkirche Dresden. With Cornelia Osterwald and Lenka Matějáková, he gave concerts as the "Barocktrio Dresden-Leipzig". Since 2016 he plays with Lenka Matějáková, Andreas Kuhlmann, Matthias Wilde and Dariya Hrynkiv in the "Ensemble International".

Faßmann plays on replica of the "Il Cannone Guarnerius" violin from the master workshop of the luthier Joachim Schade (Halle/Saale).

== Recordings (selection) ==
- Wolfgang Amadeus Mozart: Sinfonie A-Dur KV 134 (Sächsische Tonträger, 1997)
- Salomon Jadassohn: Viertes Trio für Pianoforte, Violine und Violoncello op. 85 (Institut für deutsche Musikkultur im östlichen Europa, 2003)
- Wolfgang Amadeus Mozart: Sinfonien und Serenaden (B.T.M., 2004)
- Gaetano Donizetti: La favorite – Arr. for two violins by Richard Wagner with texts by Michael Dissmeyer (D. Oehms, 2005)
- Dmitri Shostakovich: Musik für Violine und Klavier (Chr. Frank, 2012)
