= Lenka Matějáková =

Czech violinist

Lenka Matějáková (born 1986) is a Czech violinist.

== Career ==
Born in Jilemnice, Czechoslovakia, Matějáková received her first violin lessons at the age of five at the primary music school in Prague with Eva Bublová. She continued her education at the Prague Conservatory in the class of Pavel Kudelásek.

From 2007 to 2008 she studied at the University of Music and Performing Arts Vienna with Jela Špitková, and from 2008 to 2012 with Jan Pospíchal. This was followed by Master's studies at the Hochschule für Musik Carl Maria von Weber Dresden with Jörg Faßmann. From 2014 to 2015 she was in the class of Wolfgang Hentrich. She took part in various master class in Israel, France, Switzerland, the US and the Czech Republic.

Together with Václav Hudeček she went on tour in the Czech Republic. Under the direction of Ekkehard Klemm, she performed Benjamin Britten's violin concerto as part of the university symphony concerts in the Semperoper Dresden.

Recitals have taken her to various cities in Europe. As a soloist she has performed with Czech orchestras, including in the Rudolfinum with the Czech National Symphony Orchestra and in the Prague Castle with the Czech Chamber Philharmonic Prague, as well as in the Bedřich Smetana Hall of the Municipal House with the Prague Symphony Orchestra. From 2012 to 2013, she was a member of the Giuseppe Sinopoli Academy of the Sächsische Staatskapelle Dresden.

She has performed at international music festivals, including the Mährischer Herbst, the Festspiele Mecklenburg-Vorpommern, the Festival van Vlaanderen, the Walkenrieder Kreuzgangkonzerte and participated in competitions. With the "Puella Trio" she was awarded best chamber music ensemble in Weikersheim.

Matějáková is a scholarship holder of the Brücke/Most Foundation and the German Academic Exchange Service.

In 2016, she had a temporary contract at the Dresden Philharmonic as deputy 1st concert master. At the same time, she founded the chamber music ensemble with her long-time chamber music partners. "Ensemble International".

== Prizes and awards ==
- 2003: 1st prize – International Violin Competition Open Art, Nová Paka (Czech Republic).
- 2010: 2nd prize – Stefanie Hohl Violin Competition, Vienna.
- 2013: eco-Preis – BASF Schwarzheide GmbH.

== Discography ==
- In 2009, Lenka Matějáková released a CD of contemporary Czech music with the Puella Trio. OCLC 1145611522
- Duo animé: works by Antonin Dvořák, Leoš Janácek, Bohuslav Martinů and Josef Suk. Lenka Matějáková (violin), Dariya Hrynkiv (piano), GENUIN classics, Leipzig 2019. OCLC 1178740040
