= Sergej Tcherepanov =

Russian organist (born 1967)

Sergej Tcherepanov Сергей Черепанов
- Born: 1967 (age 57–58); Kazakhstan, USSR
- Education: Moscow Conservatory; Musikhochschule Lübeck; Hochschule für Musik und Theater Hamburg
- Occupations: Classical organist; Harpsichordist; Academic teacher
- Organizations: St. Petri, Bosau; Musikhochschule Lübeck

Sergej Tcherepanov (Russian: Сергей Черепанов, born 1967) is a Russian organ and harpsichord teacher and church musician working in Germany. He is church musician in Bosau, and a lecturer at the Musikhochschule Lübeck. As a concert organist and a continuo player, he has appeared internationally. He has performed as duo partner on tours of clarinetist Giora Feidman.

== Life and career ==
Tcherepanov was born in 1967 in the north of Kazakhstan (then USSR). He studied music at the Moscow Conservatory, piano with Viktor Merzhanov and organ with Natalia Gureeva and Alexander Fiseiskyn. He attended further master classes for organ and harpsichord, including with Siebe Henstra in Utrecht, and participated in various ensembles for Early Music, among others working with Alexei Lubimov and Yuri Bashmet.

He continued his organ studies in Germany in 1997 with Martin Haselböck at the Musikhochschule Lübeck. He studied for the concert exam from 2000 to 2002 at the Hochschule für Musik und Theater Hamburg with Wolfgang Zerer. He received a scholarship of the Hamburg Busche-Stiftung, and studied further with Harald Vogel, and at a historic organ in Stade with Martin Böcker He took master classes in Paris with Jean Guillou and Olivier Latry.

From 2000 to 2003, he was organist at the Arp Schnitger organ in Steinkirchen near Hamburg. Since 2002, he has been a lecturer for organ playing and piano accompaniment at the Musikhochschule Lübeck. Since 2003, he has worked as a church musician and organist at the Petrikirche in Bosau. He is artistic director of the annual Bosau Summerkonzerte festival, where he launched the Bosau International Summer Academy in 2009, held annually parallel to the summer concerts and offering master classes in organ, harpsichord, oboe and baroque violin.

Tcherepanov's solo concerts have taken him to many European countries. He performed as a continuo player with ensembles for Early Music at international festivals such as the Salzburg Festival and Festival Oude Muziek in Utrecht. His partners in chamber music have included violinist Gunar Letzbor, oboist Diethelm Jonas, flutist Susanne Ehrhardt and balalaika player Alexander Paperny. He has appeared as duo partner of clarinetist Giora Feidman, on tours with a program from classical to klezmer, at places including the Berliner Dom. He has collaborated with theatres in Flensburg, Kiel and Mexico.

He has been lecturer of organ and piano accompaniment at the Musikhochschule Lübeck. He has been on the jury of organ competitions, and has taught organ and harpsichord as a guest lecturer. He has made recordings for television and CD.

== Awards ==
In 1997, Tcherepanov won the 34th competition of the Possehl-Stiftung in Lübeck. In 2000 he received the prize of the Arp Schnitger Association, and afterwards further prizes in Germany and South Africa. He was awarded the culture prize of Ostholstein in 2020.
