= Bremer Kaffeehaus-Orchester =

German musical ensemble

The Bremer Kaffeehaus-Orchester is a German musical ensemble of classically trained musicians that was founded in Bremen on 30 April 1990 and has played in an unchanged line-up ever since. They play a style commonly referred to as coffeehouse music or salon music.

The ensemble consists of Constantin Dorsch (violin), Klaus Fische (flute, piccolo, saxophone, clarinet, bass clarinet, moderation), Johannes Grundhoff (piano, until 2022), Anselm Hauke (double bass), Gero John (violoncello), and Machiko Totani (piano, from 2022). In their performances, which are presented in a humorous way, they also use rather rare instruments such as a reception doorbell or a vuvuzela.

The repertoire includes, among others. Works by Johann Pachelbel, Antonio Vivaldi, Wolfgang Amadeus Mozart, Robert Schumann, Giuseppe Verdi, Johann Strauss II, Johannes Brahms, Georges Bizet, Edvard Grieg, Erik Satie, Paul Lincke, Franz Lehár, Carlos Gardel, Felix Bernard, Duke Ellington, Aram Khachaturian, Glenn Miller, Sonny Burke, Henry Mancini, The Beatles, Deep Purple, Sting, Seal and increasingly their own compositions.

The group regularly gives concerts in the Bremen concert hall Die Glocke, but also throughout Germany and neighbouring countries.

Since 1995, numerous recordings of music by the Bremen Coffee House Orchestra have been available.

== Recording (selection) ==
- Die Erste (1995)
- Die Zweite (1996)
- Die Dritte (1997)
- Weihnachtsstimmung (1998)
- Lieben Sie Strauß? (Sony Musik Entertainment, 1999)
- Rendezvous im Kaffeehaus (Sony Musik Entertainment, 2000)
- Winter Wonderland (Gero John, 2003)
- Träumerei im Kaffeehaus (2004)
- Best of Kaffeehaus (2005)
- Weihnachten im Kaffeehaus (2006)
- Café Espressivo (2009)
- Bremer Weihnacht (2011)
- Opus 12 (Gero John, 2012)
- Black Coffee (2015)
