= David Orlowsky Trio =

German music ensemble

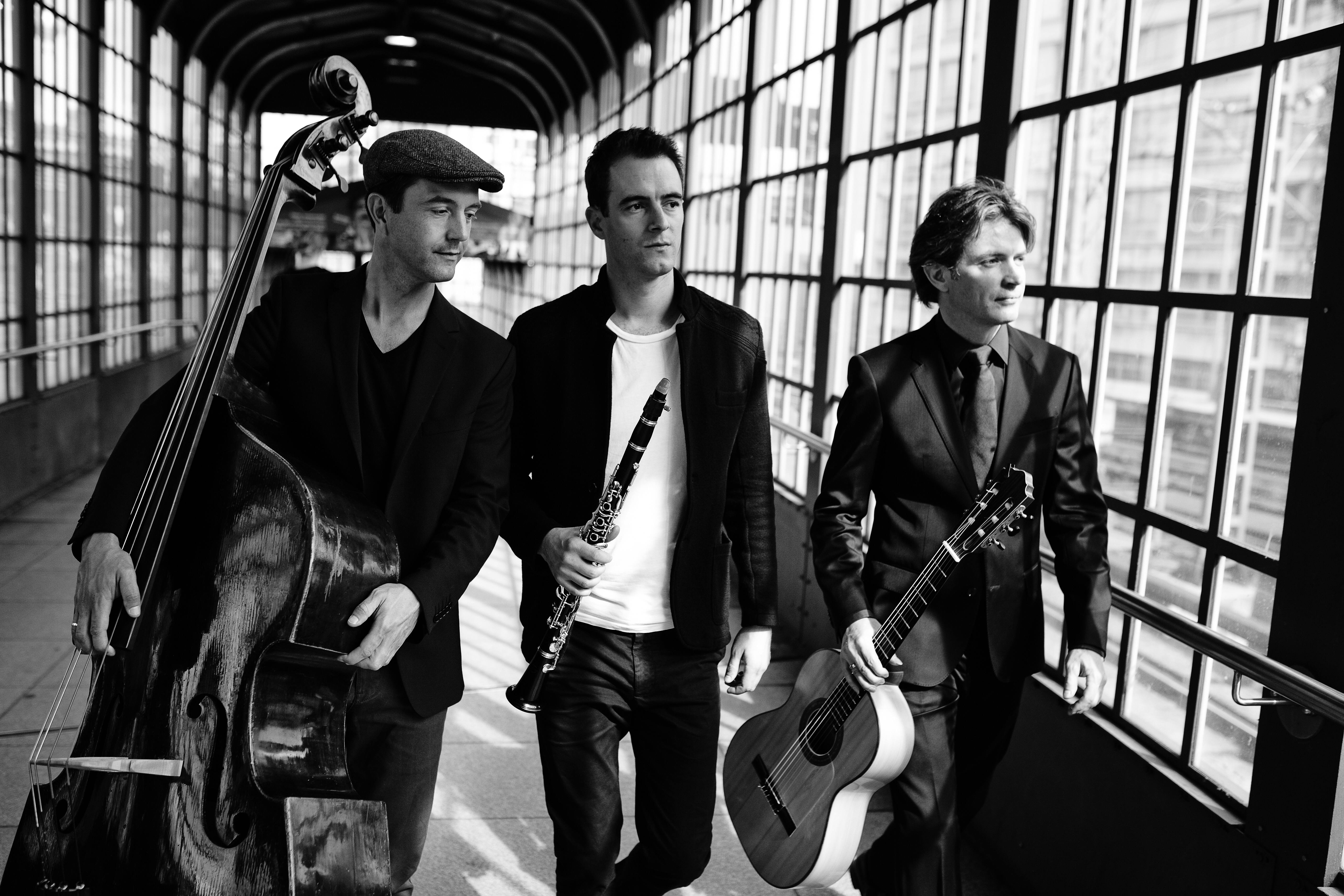
David Orlowsky Trio (2014)

The David Orlowsky Trio (previously: Klezmorim or David Orlowsky's Klezmorim) was a German music ensemble founded in 1997 and disbanded in 2019.

== History ==
The founding members of the Trio included the clarinettist David Orlowsky, the double bassist Florian Dohrmann and the guitarist Jo Ambros. Jo Ambros was succeeded by Frank Wekenmann (* 1968) from 2003 to 2005; from 2005 Jens-Uwe Popp (* 1967) took over the guitarist position in the trio.

In the beginning, the ensemble played traditional klezmer music. Today, the repertoire consists mainly of original compositions with influences from klezmer, jazz, Arabic music and chamber music.

The trio's compositions are published in 5 music books by Advance Music / Schott-Verlag. and at the Self-publishing Verlag Bookmundo.

Since 1999, the trio has released ten CDs seven of them on Sony classical. In 2008, they changed their name to David Orlowsky Trio.

Concert tours have taken the trio to America, Asia, Europe; they have performed at the Concertgebouw Amsterdam, Carnegie Hall New York and the Berlin Philharmonie. The ensemble has performed at the Schleswig-Holstein Music Festival, the Ludwigsburger Schlossfestspiele, the Rheingau Musik Festival, the Lucerne Festival, the Beethovenfest Bonn and the Walkenrieder Kreuzgangkonzerte.

Among others, musical partners have included Iveta Apkalna (organ), Avi Avital (mandolin), Per Arne Glorvigen (bandoneon), the Kammerakademie Potsdam, Ross Daly lyre), Daniel Hope (violin), Dominique Horwitz (actor).

In 2019, the trio gave its farewell tour under the motto "Milestones - 20 years of David Orlowsky Trio". The last concert took place as part of the Schleswig-Holstein Music Festival on 30 August 2019 at the Meldorf Cathedral.

== Prizes and awards ==
The ensemble was awarded the ECHO Klassik in the category "Classical Music without Borders" in 2008. In 2015, the trio again received the ECHO Klassik in this category.

== Recording ==
- 2001 – Sedum (Way Out Records)
- 2003 – Panta Rhei (Way Out Records)
- 2004 – Lark (Way Out Records)
- 2007 – Noema (Sony Classical)
- 2008 – Nessiah (Sony Classical)
- 2011 – Chronos (Sony Classical)
- 2014 – Klezmer Kings - A Tribute (Sony Classical)
- 2015 – Symphonic Klezmer (Sony Classical)
- 2017 – Paris – Odessa (Sony Classical)
- 2019 – One Last Night-Live at Elbphilharmonie Hamburg (Sony Classical)
