= Stiftung Braunschweigischer Kulturbesitz =

German foundation

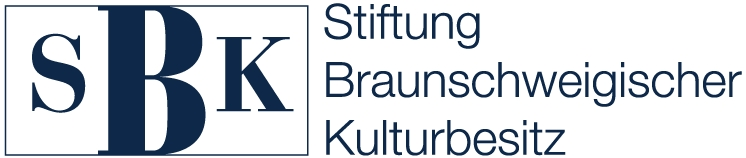
Stiftungslogo

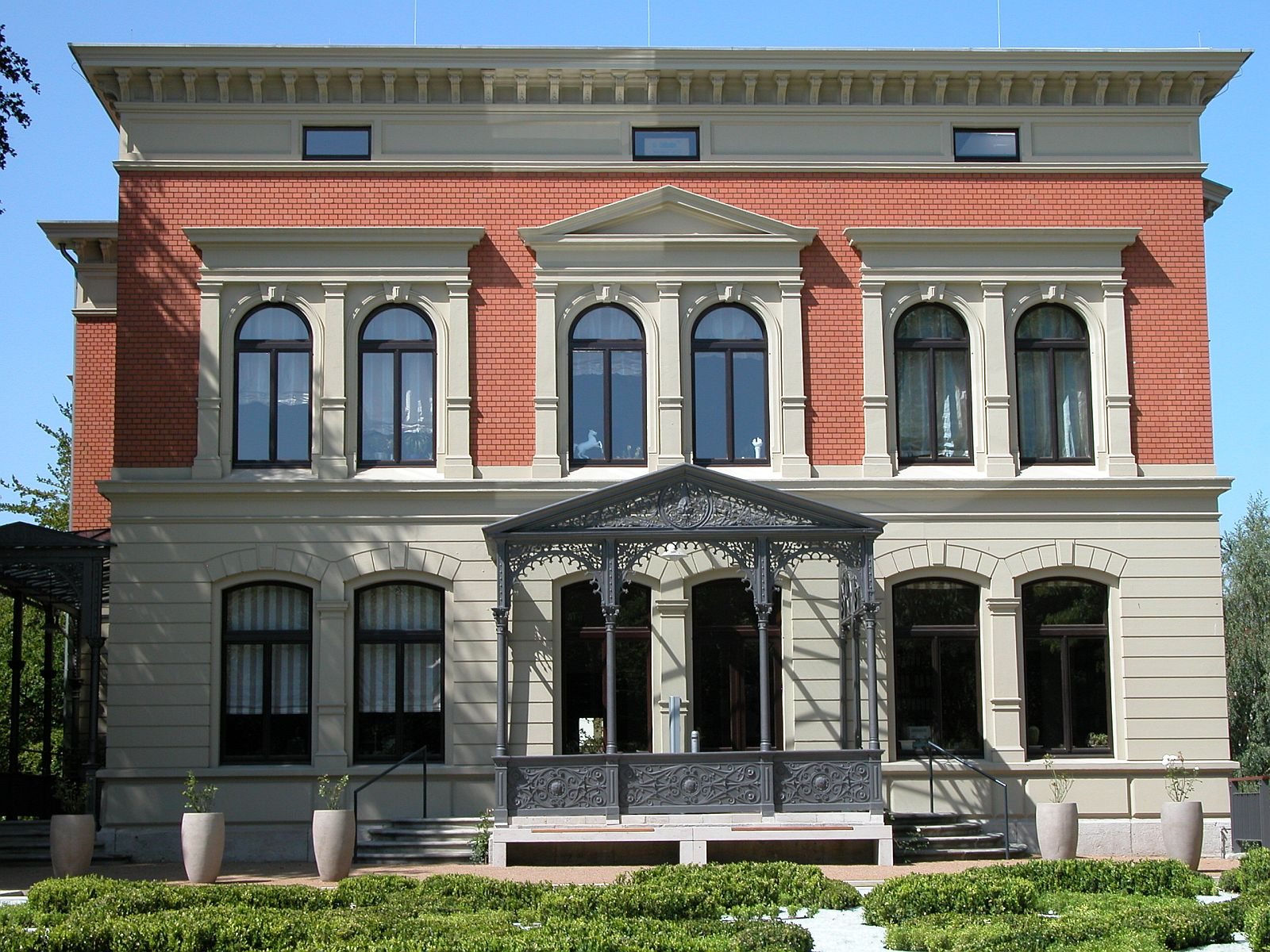
Sitz der Stiftung Braunschweigischer Kulturbesitz: Die Gerloffsche Villa (Haus der Braunschweigischen Stiftungen) at Löwenwall

The Stiftung Braunschweigischer Kulturbesitz (SBK) was established by Gesetz über die Stiftung Braunschweigischer Kulturbesitz of 16 December 2004 with effect from 1 January 2005 as a Stiftung öffentlichen Rechts with its seat in Braunschweig.

== History of origins ==
Following the dissolution of the Braunschweig (region) on 31 December 2004, which until that date had held the assets of the "Braunschweig United Monastery and Study Fund" (founded in 1569) and the Braunschweig Foundation (founded in 1934), the need arose to create an institution that would be responsible for the continuity of cultural and historical identity of the Freistaat Braunschweig. This happened with the founding of the SBK, under whose umbrella the other two foundations were united.

== Purpose of the foundation ==
The primary purpose of the foundation is the promotion and preservation of cultural and historical traditions of the Brunswick Land and the former Brunswick Land. In addition to church, cultural and social projects, the Braunschweigisches Landesmuseum, the Staatstheater Braunschweig and the Technische Universität Braunschweig are also supported from the foundation's assets. The SBK is responsible for organising regional cultural promotion for the State of Lower Saxony.

== Foundation assets ==
The foundation's assets amount to over 275 million euros and consist largely of real estates and financial deposits. The properties include, among others, cultural assets such as the Kaiserdom in Königslutter, a large number of monasteries and churches, more than 20 foundation and monastery estates with about 7,500 hectares of arable land as well as 5,500 hectares of forestry land and more than 3,000 hereditary building rights. Projects are supported from the annual income of about two million euros.

The City of Braunschweig plans to transfer part of the municipal real estate and land portfolio in Riddagshausen to the SBK. Dazu gehören along others die Kloster Riddagshausen, die Gaststätte Riddagshausen as well as the former Reichsjägerhof „Hermann Göring“. The SBK will lease part of this land to the Evangelische Stiftung Neuerkerode.

== Critic ==
In June 2017, the Niedersächsischer Landesrechnungshof criticised in its annual report "inappropriately high expenses" of the Foundation, its president and its Director in their representation and entertainment costs, business trips to other European countries as well as inappropriately large official cars. Expenditure on administration rose from €150,000 per year to €930,000 within ten years.
