= Bachorchester zu Leipzig =

German chamber orchestra

The Bachorchester zu Leipzig (sometimes also Bachorchester Leipzig, formerly Bachorchester des Gewandhauses zu Leipzig) is a chamber orchestra made up of musicians from the Leipzig Gewandhaus Orchestra, which performs music by Johann Sebastian Bach and other masters of Baroque and pre-Classical music. Its director is Christian Funke.

== History ==
Gewandhauskapellmeister Franz Konwitschny performed Bach's six Brandenburg Concertos with a small cast of the Gewandhaus Orchestra to great acclaim at the Bachfest Leipzig in 1962. This was Konwitschny's last conducting in Leipzig before his death the same year. The concertmaster of the Gewandhaus Orchestra, Gerhard Bosse, continuing Konwitschny's legacy, established the small ensemble in 1963 as the "Bach Orchestra of the Gewandhaus zu Leipzig" during the period without a chief conductor. This orchestra subsequently undertook several concert tours abroad in the West, including as one of the first GDR ensembles to the FRG after the Berlin Wall building of 1961, which caused the displeasure of the remaining orchestra members of the Gewandhaus.

Bosse and the Gewandhaus director Karl Zumpe appeased them with alleged, but in reality non-existent, state resolutions. The international successes of the Bach Orchestra and the somewhat compensatory regulation that members of the Bach Orchestra should be given less consideration when the Gewandhaus Orchestra travelled abroad brought some peace.

In 1979, Kurt Masur called Christian Funke from the Dresden Staatskapelle to Leipzig under the promise that he would be able to take over the Bach Orchestra after Bosse. Although Masur toyed with the idea of dissolving the somewhat outdated Bach Orchestra in favour of other younger chamber ensembles, Funke insisted on the promise. Masur kept his promise by completely separating the Bach Orchestra from the Gewandhaus Orchestra, i.e. the music-making of the Gewandhaus members in the Bach Orchestra was now regarded as a secondary or leisure activity.

The now newly formed Bach Orchestra performed for the first time at the Gewandhaus on 16 January 1988 and soon began a successful touring schedule. When the centrally mediating Künstler-Agentur der DDR ceased its work after the Peaceful Revolution in 1990, Funke was well prepared for this situation by taking over from the Gewandhaus. In order to resolve the last conflict with the Gewandhaus Orchestra, the name "Bachorchester des Gewandhauses zu Leipzig", which was left after the separation from the Gewandhaus, was shortened to "Bachorchester zu Leipzig" in 2014.
