= Staatsorchester Braunschweig =

The Staatsorchester Braunschweig is a German orchestra in Braunschweig, Lower Saxony. It was founded in 1587 by Julius, Duke of Brunswick-Wolfenbüttel as his court orchestra. It worked with Franz Liszt and Richard Strauss. It lost its independence as a court orchestra in 1918 and became the orchestra of the Braunschweiger Landestheaters. It retained this status until the end of the Second World War, which saw the abolishment of the Free State of Brunswick, on which it took the name Braunschweiger Staatsorchester then its present name.

== Kapellmeisters and conductors ==
These have included several notable musicians:

- Michael Praetorius
- Heinrich Schütz
- Karl Heinrich Graun
- Louis Spohr
- Felix Mendelssohn Bartholdy
- Hector Berlioz
- Franz Liszt
- Richard Strauss

In the past 40 years its music directors have included Heribert Esser, Stefan Soltesz, Philippe Auguin, Jonas Alber and Alexander Joel. Carl Melles was its conductor laureate until his death in 2004.
