= Annette Unger =

German classical violinist

Annette Unger, née Börner, (born 28 May 1962) is a German violinist and a scholar academic.

== Life and career ==
Unger was born in Dresden, the daughter of flutist and university teacher Ruth Börner (1936-2017) and the composer, cantor and Kapellmeister Hans Börner born and began playing the violin at the age of six. After attending the Dresden Special School of Music, she studied violin and Chamber Music with Karl Unger (a member of the Sächsische Staatskapelle Dresden) at the Hochschule für Musik Carl Maria von Weber Dresden. After graduating, she received a teaching position there and in 1992 became Professor of Violin.

Unger has performed as a soloist and chamber music partner in Europe, Japan and Korea and has worked with, among others, the Staatskapelle St. Petersburg, the Dresdner Kapellsolisten, the Landesbühnen Sachsen, the Elbland Philharmonie Sachsen, the orchestra of the Theater Lüneburg with conductors such as Ekkehard Klemm, Helmut Branny, Klaus Zoephel, Urs Theus and Hans Börner. She has also made guest appearances at festivals such as the Dresden Music Festival, the Festival Dreiklang, Mitte Europa and the Mozart Festival Würzburg and at the Schubertiade Schnackenburg.

Since 1994 she has been a member of the Dresdner Kapellsolisten and together with this ensemble was the winner of the ECHO Klassik 2010 edition.

In addition to her teaching activities in Dresden, Unger regularly gives master classes in Germany, the Czech Republic, Italy, Switzerland and the USA. In 1999, she founded the Internationale Musikakademie Meißen e.V. to promote young artists.

She also acted as a juror at international competitions such as the Queen Sophie Charlotte Competition of the Festival of Arts in Mirow, Live Music Now, the Anton Rubinstein Competition in Dresden, the Max Bruch Competition in Cologne. At the International Competition "Szymon Goldberg" for Violin and Viola Meißen, she has been the artistic director and jury chairperson since 2008.

== Lectures and publications ==
Publications by Annette Unger have been issued by Schott-Verlag, Artama - Zentralhaus Publikation and ESTA.

== Recording ==
CDs with Unger have been released on the labels Genuin classics and Sächsische Tonträger with works from the Baroque to the Modern.
