= Helmut Branny =

German conductor and double bassist

- Born: 1957 (age 68–69); Ore Mountains, Bezirk Dresden, East Germany
- Education: Hochschule für Musik Carl Maria von Weber
- Occupations: Double bassist; Conductor; Academic teacher
- Organizations: Sächsische Staatskapelle Dresden; Dresdner Kapellsolisten; Cappella Musica Dresden; Hochschule für Musik Carl Maria von Weber
- Awards: ECHO Klassik

Helmut Branny (born 1957) is a German conductor, double bassist and professor of chamber music at the Hochschule für Musik Carl Maria von Weber Dresden. He is a member of the Sächsische Staatskapelle Dresden, musical director of the Dresdner Kapellsolisten and the Cappella Musica Dresden. With the Kapellsolisten, he has made many recordings, and toured internationally.

== Career ==
Branny, born in the Ore Mountains, Bezirk Dresden (then in East Germany), studied double bass at the Hochschule für Musik Carl Maria von Weber in Dresden with Heinz Herrmann from 1973 to 1979. Subsequently, he was engaged at the Staatskapelle Dresden.

Since its foundation in 1994, he has led the Dresdner Kapellsolisten. With the chamber orchestra, he has given guest performances in Europe and Asia among others. He has performed at the Berlin Philharmonie, Kölner Philharmonie, and at festivals such as the Rheingau Musik Festival, and Festival Mitte Europa.

He has also conducted with soloists such as Alison Balsom, Albrecht Mayer, Martin Stadtfeld, Matthias Goerne, Gábor Boldoczki, Nils Mönkemeyer, Dorothee Oberlinger, Sergei Nakariakov and Lise de la Salle. In addition to his membership of the Staatskapelle, he has held a teaching post at the Hochschule für Musik Carl Maria von Weber since 1995, and has been a professor for chamber music there since 2003. His engagements in Dresden have taken him among others to the Dresden Frauenkirche, the Dresden Music Festivals and the Moritzburg Festival. Branny and the Kapellsolisten have a long-standing artistic relationship with the Dresdner Kreuzchor. He is also responsible for the musical direction of the Cappella Musica Dresden, founded in 1995.

Branny is a chamber music partner of ensembles including Akademie für Alte Musik Berlin, Freiburger Barockorchester, Mitteldeutsche Barocksolisten Leipzig and "Les amis de Philippe" in Bremen. He has collaborated with conductor Peter Schreier and cellist Jan Vogler. Branny also deals with contemporary music, performing world premieres of works by Rainer Lischka, Takashi Jashimatsu and Berthold Paul, interpreting works by Wolfgang Rihm and Kazimierz Serocki, among others. In 2012, he conducted the Kapellsolisten and singers in a revival of the opera La casa disabitata by Princess Amalie of Saxony, which had been rediscovered in Moscow. Branny led a recording with bassoon concertos found in the library of the Dresden Court which acquired the collection of Johann Georg Pisendel, a concerto by Johann Gottlieb Graun, two concertos by Antonín Reichenauer and one concerto by Franz Horneck.

== Awards ==
2010: ECHO Klassik – "Concert Recording of the Years" for Weichet nur, betrübte Schatten

== Recordings ==
Recordings of the Kapellsolisten conducted by Branny have included:

- Jubilate Deo (VEB Deutsche Schallplatten, 1988)
- Haydn – Konzert für Oboe und Orchester C-Dur (Sächsische Tonträger, 1995?)
- Haydn – Sinfonie G-Dur Nr. 94 "mit dem Paukenschlag" (Günter Voigt, Jan Vogler, 1996)
- Mozart – Symphony No. 21, K. 134 (Sächsische Tonträger, 1997)
- Mit Pauken und Trompeten (Sächsische Tonträger, 1997)
- Mozart – Sinfonien und Serenaden (B.T.M., 2004)
- Mit Pauken und Trompeten (B.T.M., 2004)
- Mozart – Konzert für Flöte, Harfe und Orchester, K 299 (B.T.M., 2004)
- Mozart – Berühmte Bläserkonzerte (B.T.M., 2004)
- Zeitgenossen – Musik der Zeit / 28. Dresdner Konzerte (Wolfgang Smitmans, 2007)
- Jan Vogler – my tunes / 1 (Sony, 2007)
- Schubert / Mendelssohn Bartholdy / Schumann – Weichet nur, betrübte Schatten (Sony, 2009)
- Haydn – Symphonies No. 26, 43 & 83 (Sony, 2009)
- Dennis (Sony, 2009)
- Jan Vogler – my tunes / 2 (Sony, 2010)
- Elin Kolev, violin (Sony, 2011)
- Bach / Corelli / Handel / Telemann / Torelli / Vivaldi – Festliches Konzert (ARS Produktion, 2015, of live concert at Villa Hügel, 8 December 2013)
- Graun / Horneck / Reichenauer / Telemann – Dresdner Fagottkonzerte aus Schranck II (Dresden bassoon concertos from cabinet II) (ARS Produktion, 2016)
