= Dresdner Kapellsolisten =

German musical ensemble

- Chamber orchestra
- Founded: 1994
- Location: Dresden
- Principal conductor: Helmut Branny
- Website: www.dresdner-kapellsolisten.de

The Dresdner Kapellsolisten is a German chamber orchestra based in Dresden. The ensemble of soloists was formed in 1994 mostly by members of the Staatskapelle Dresden, directed by double bassist Helmut Branny. They play mostly music of the 18th to 20th centuries, on modern instruments but in historically informed performances. They focus on music by less-known composers from the 18th to 20th centuries, namely composers from Dresden. The chamber orchestra has performed in Germany, Southern Europe, Japan and South Korea, including festivals such as Mozart Festival Würzburg and Rheingau Musik Festival. They have produced numerous recordings.

== History ==
The chamber orchestra was founded in Dresden in 1994. It is made up mostly of musicians from the Staatskapelle Dresden and the Dresden Philharmonic; individual members of the ensemble are also active in the Dresdner Trompeten Consort. In contrast to other orchestras, equal cooperation with each other is particularly important to the players, including director Helmut Branny, a double bass player of the Staatskapelle.

The repertoire of the orchestra ranges from Baroque music to contemporary music, with a focus on the music of the 18th to 20th centuries played in historically informed performances, but playing on modern instruments. They have revived music by less-known composers, including Friedrich Wilhelm Herschel, Johann Gottlieb Naumann, Antonio Rosetti and Anton Teyber. Composers from Dresden are of special interest, such as Amalia of Saxony, Johann Gottlieb Graun, Antonio Lotti, Johann Georg Pisendel, Franz Seydelmann and Jan Dismas Zelenka. The Kapellsolisten have performed with soloists such as Maurice André, Isabelle van Keulen, Axel Köhler, Viktoria Mullova, Peter Schreier, Nils Mönkemeyer, and Jan Vogler. They also played with Alison Balsom, Gábor Boldoczki, Matthias Goerne, Danjulo Ishizaka, François Leleux, Albrecht Mayer, Sergei Nakariakov, Peter Rösel, Lise de la Salle and Martin Stadtfeld.

The orchestra has performed in radio broadcasts of Mitteldeutscher Rundfunk, Norddeutscher Rundfunk, Deutsche Welle and DeutschlandRadio Berlin, among others. They have played at major music centres and festivals in Germany, Southern Europe, Japan and South Korea. Festivals have included the Festspiele Mecklenburg-Vorpommern, Mozart Festival Würzburg, Rheingau Musik Festival, Choriner Musiksommer, Kissinger Sommer, MDR Musiksommer, Festival Mitte Europa and Walkenrieder Kreuzgangkonzerte. They have produced many CDs. For a concert celebrating their 20th anniversary, they commissioned a work from Petr Popelka, who is double bass player of the Staatskapelle Dresden and the Kapellsolisten, and wrote a Sinfonia da camera (chamber symphony) in five movements. The final movement includes a vocal part. They are scheduled to perform the closing concerts of the 2021 Weilburger Schlosskonzerte with music by Luigi Boccherini, Michael Haydn and Josef Haydn.

== Prizes and awards ==
- 2010: ECHO Klassik – Konzerteinspielung des Jahres (Concert recording of the year): Weichet nur, betrübte Schatten, with violist Nils Mönkemeyer

== Recordings ==
Recordings of the Kapellsolisten conducted by Branny have included:

- Haydn – Konzert für Oboe und Orchester C-Dur (Sächsische Tonträger, 1995?)
- Haydn – Sinfonie G-Dur Nr. 94 "mit dem Paukenschlag" (Günter Voigt, Jan Vogler, 1996)
- Mozart – Symphony No. 21, K. 134 (Sächsische Tonträger, 1997)
- Mit Pauken und Trompeten (Sächsische Tonträger, 1997)
- Mozart – Sinfonien und Serenaden (B.T.M., 2004)
- Mit Pauken und Trompeten (B.T.M., 2004)
- Mozart – Konzert für Flöte, Harfe und Orchester, K 299 (B.T.M., 2004)
- Mozart – Berühmte Bläserkonzerte (B.T.M., 2004)
- Zeitgenossen – Musik der Zeit / 28. Dresdner Konzerte (Wolfgang Smitmans, 2007)
- Jan Vogler – my tunes / 1 (Sony, 2007)
- Schubert / Mendelssohn Bartholdy / Schumann – Weichet nur, betrübte Schatten (Sony, 2009)
- Haydn – Symphonies No. 26, 43 & 83 (Sony, 2009)
- Dennis (Sony, 2009)
- Jan Vogler – my tunes / 2 (Sony, 2010)
- Elin Kolev, violin (Sony, 2011)
- Bach / Corelli / Handel / Telemann / Torelli / Vivaldi – Festliches Konzert (ARS Produktion, 2015, of live concert at Villa Hügel, 8 December 2013)
- Graun / Horneck / Reichenauer / Telemann – Dresdner Fagottkonzerte aus Schranck II (Dresden bassoon concertos from drawer II) (ARS Produktion, 2016)
