= La casa disabitata =

- Opera by Princess Amalie of Saxony
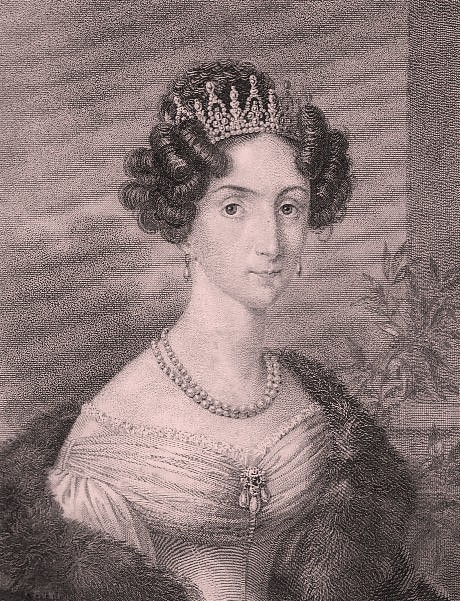
- Princess Amalie of Saxony
- Librettist: Princess Amalie of Saxony
- Language: Italian
- Premiere: 17 September 1835; Pillnitz Castle, Dresden

La casa disabitata (The Uninhabited House) is a comic opera in one act composed by Princess Amalie of Saxony to her own Italian-language libretto. It was first performed in the court theatre of Pillnitz Castle in Dresden on 17 September 1835. The opera had no further performances until it was revived in 2012 as part of the Dresden Music Festival after its manuscript score was found in a Moscow library.

== Background and performance history ==
La casa disabitata was the last of the 12 short comic operas which Princess Amalie had composed to her own libretti as entertainments for the Saxon court in Dresden. The story is not original. The opera's title, plot, setting, and characters are the same as those of Giovanni Giraud's one-act farce La casa disabitata, first performed in 1808 and published in 1825. Giraud's play was also the basis of the two-act opera La casa disabitata, composed by Lauro Rossi to a libretto by Jacopo Ferretti. Rossi's opera premiered at La Scala to great success in 1834, a year before Princess Amalie's version, and was subsequently performed throughout Italy and in Paris.

Princess Amalie's La casa disabitata was performed in the small court theatre of Pillnitz Castle on 17 September 1835. The evening also included Johann Pixis performing his piano composition Les trois Clochettes and his adopted daughter Francilla Pixis singing Dessauer's bolero "Le Retour des promis". According to Prince Albert of Saxony, opera performances like this were generally for special court occasions and not repeated. The Saxon State Library holds a copy of Friedrich Baumfelder's 1874 arrangement of one of the opera's arias ("Oh luce del giorno") and one other fragment. However, the manuscript score of the opera itself had been amongst those confiscated by the Russian army at the end of World War II and taken back to Russia.

The Dresden-based oboist Petra Andrejewski discovered the score in a Moscow library and reconstructed the opera for a revival at the Dresden Music Festival on 27 May 2012—the first performance of La casa disabitata in 177 years. The performance was in concert version (Russian authorities would only grant permission to use the manuscript for a single unstaged performance). It took place in the salon of the 17th-century summer palace in Dresden's Großer Garten with Helmut Branny conducting the Dresdner Kapellsolisten. The performance was also recorded for later broadcast on several European radio stations including Mitteldeutscher Rundfunk, Österreich 1, and Catalunya Música.

In her review of the 2012 revival for Musical America, Rebecca Schmid described the score as a "rehashed Mozartean farce with shades of Cimarosa and Rossini". Gramophone's critic, James Jolly, thought the music "charming and occasionally surprisingly engaging with its vivid colours and original orchestral effects."

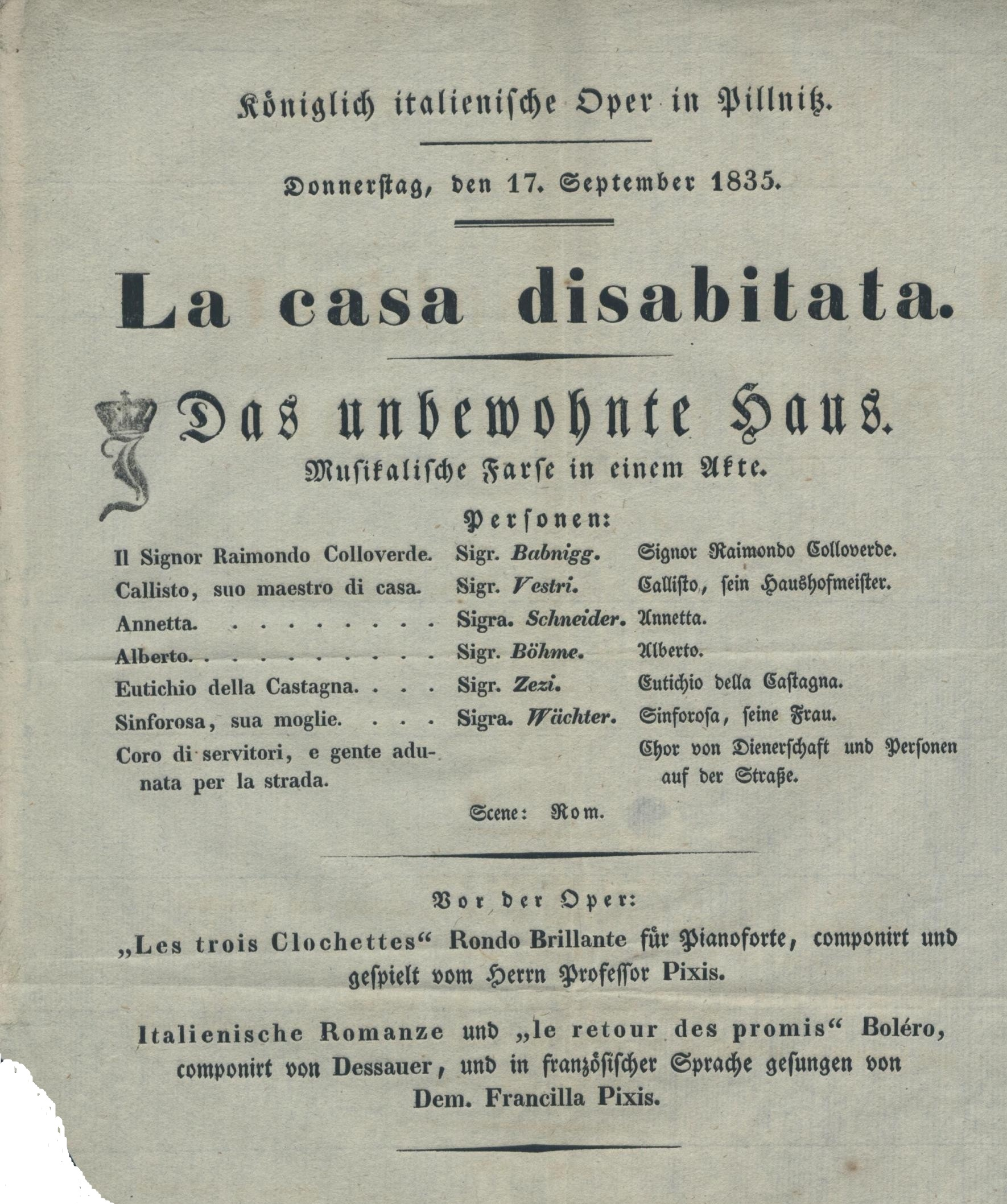
Programme for the 1835 performance

== Roles ==
Role	Voice type	Premiere cast, 17 September 1835	Revival cast, 27 May 2012 Conductor: Helmut Branny
Raimondo Colloverde, a wealthy nobleman	baritone	Anton Babnigg	Ilhun Jung
Callisto, Raimondo's major domo	baritone	Gioachino Vestri	Allen Boxer
Annetta, an orphaned young woman	soprano	Maschinka Schneider	Anja Zügner
Eutichio della Castagna, an impoverished poet	baritone	Alfonso Zezi	Matthias Henneberg
Sinforosa Eutichio's wife	soprano	Thérèse Wächter-Wittman	Tehila Nini Goldstein
Alberto, Callisto's friend and accomplice	tenor	Albert von Böhme	Aaron Pegram
Servants and passers-by

== Synopsis ==
The opera is set in an abandoned house in Rome belonging to the nobleman Don Raimondo Colloverde. Unable to rent it out because it has the reputation of being haunted, he has instructed his major domo, Callisto, to place a sign in the street offering it to a poor person rent-free.

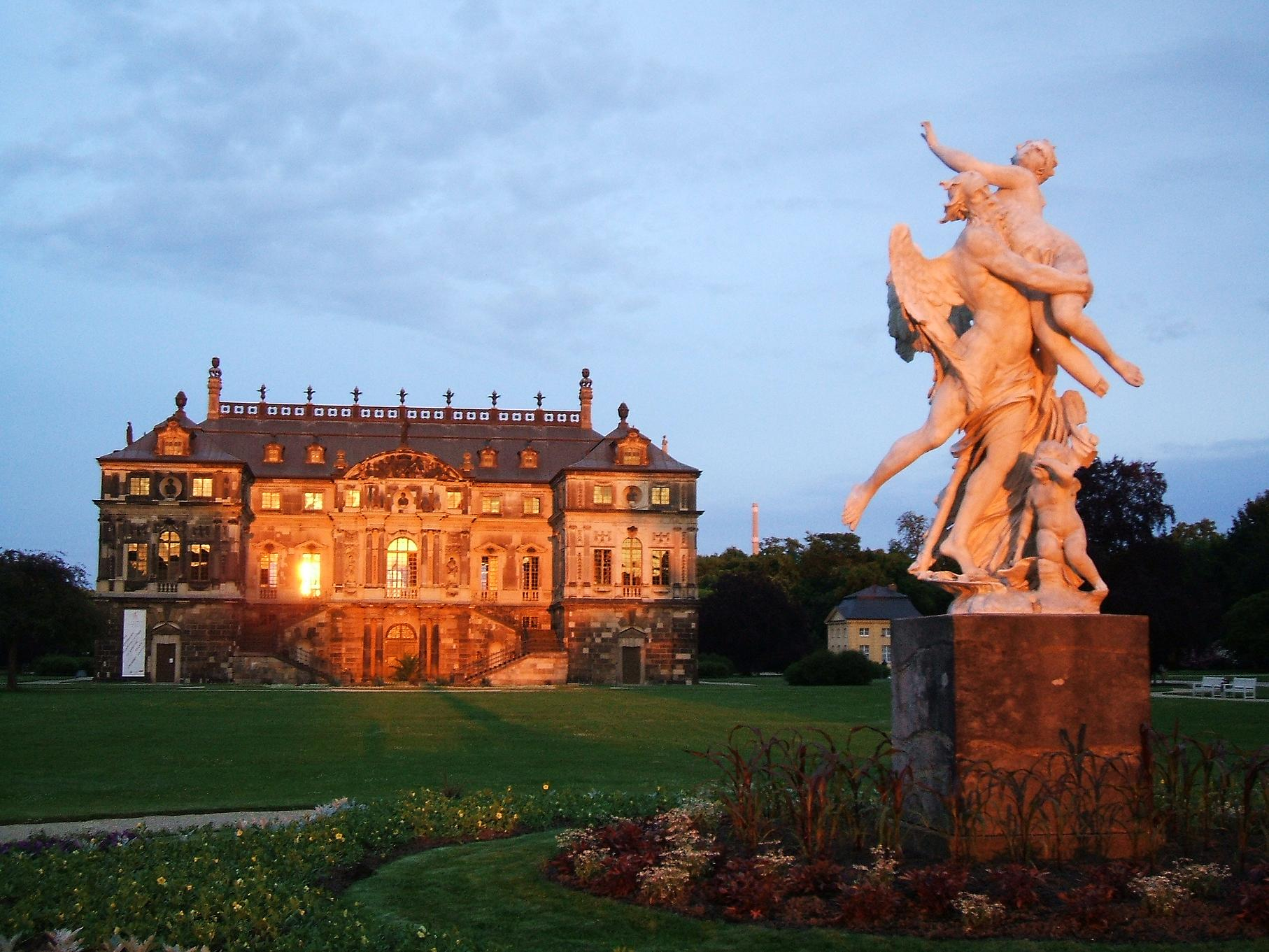
The summer palace in Dresden's Großer Garten where on 27 May 2012 La casa disabitata received its first performance in 177 years.

Unbeknownst to Raimondo, Callisto has a sideline in smuggling and contraband and uses the uninhabited property for his illegal activities. He and his friend Alberto regularly appear there as "ghosts" to frighten off prospective tenants. Callisto has also been sheltering the orphaned Annetta in the house in the hope of persuading her to marry him. He makes yet another attempt, but she refuses and tells him that she loves Don Raimondo instead. On hearing this, Callisto has Alberto lock her in one of the rooms of the house.

Meanwhile, Eutichio della Castagna, an impoverished poet, sees the sign and decides to accept Raimondo's offer. Raimondo gives him the keys and provides him with a pistol in case he becomes frightened by the ghosts. In an aside to Callisto, Raimondo asks what happened to the lovely young orphan who had been sheltering there and confesses that he has long loved her from afar. Callisto tells him that Annetta had left months ago and he has not heard from her since.

Eutichio's wife Sinforosa arrives. She is ten years older than her husband and a jealous woman. Sinforosa is immediately suspicious that Eutichio has taken the house to start a liaison with the attractive young woman seen living there. Despite his protestations to the contrary, she demands the keys to the front door to prevent him from letting her imagined rival into the house. That night Annetta manages to escape from her room. She tries to leave the house but finds the front door locked. Eutichio hears the noise and on seeing Annetta thinks she is a ghost. She finally convinces him that she is not a ghost but a real person. As Eutichio touches her hand to verify this, Sinforosa walks in. Her worst suspicions confirmed, she rails at Eutichio for his infidelity.

Callisto and Alberto now appear, veiled in black from head to toe and pretending to be ghosts. Thoroughly terrified, Eutichio shoots Callisto, wounding him in the shoulder. Uproar ensues. Don Raimondo arrives with his servants. Callisto, who has not been fatally wounded, is chastised by his master and expresses his remorse. Don Raimondo and Annetta confess their love for each other and makes plans to marry. Eutichio and Sinforosa are reconciled. Don Raimondo tells Eutichio that he and Sinforosa can live in the house rent-free for as long as they wish. All present unite to sing of their delight at the outcome.
