= Siegfried Geißler =

German composer, hornist and politician

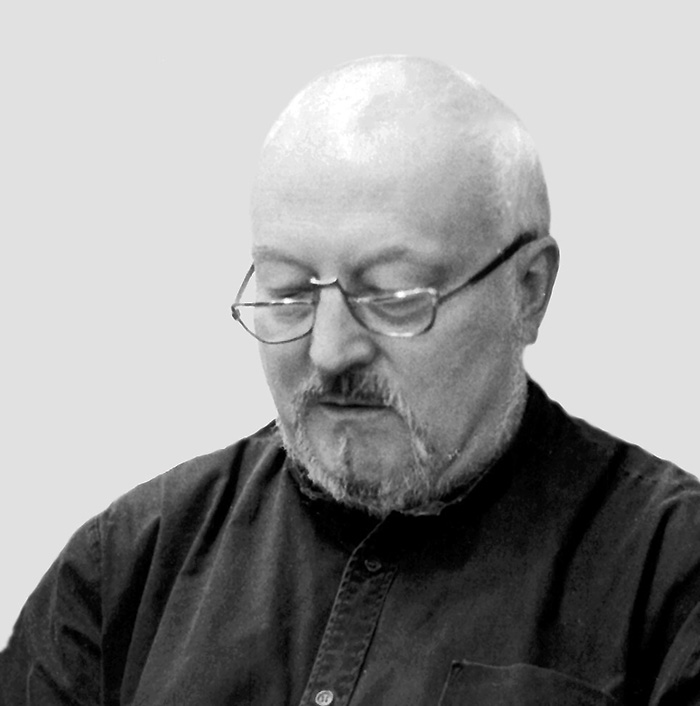
- Geißler in 2002
- Born: Siegfried Rudolf Geißler; 26 March 1929; Dresden, Germany
- Died: 10 July 2014 (aged 85); Suhl, Thuringia, Germany
- Occupations: Hornist; Conductor; Composer; Politician
- Organizations: Staatskapelle Dresden; Thüringen Philharmonie Suhl; New Forum; Landtag of Thuringia

Siegfried Rudolf Geißler (26 March 1929 – 10 July 2014) was a German composer, conductor, hornist and politician. He founded the Thüringen Philharmonie Suhl in 1979. After the Wende, he was a member of the New Forum who was elected to the first Landtag of Thuringia in 1990. As its senior, he was its Father of the House and opened the inaugural session.

== Career ==
=== Composer, conductor and hornist ===
Born in Dresden, Geißler was born the son of a working-class family in Dresden, attended elementary school from 1935 to 1943 and then studied piano and horn at the Hochschule für Musik Carl Maria von Weber Dresden until 1946. Already at this time he made some minor appearances as hornist with the Staatskapelle Dresden, the Semperoper and the Dresden Philharmonic. He then worked as principal hornist at the municipal theatre of Cottbus. In 1947, he escaped to the West and became principal hornist in the symphony orchestra of Speyer. During this time he first appeared as a conductor. After his return to the DDR in 1951 he became solo hornist of the Kreiskulturorchester of Sonneberg. From 1953 he was conductor of the Erzgebirgsphilharmonic of Aue, in 1956 of the Thüringisches Kreiskulturorchester Mühlhausen and from 1958 to 1962 under Heinz Bongartz in the Dresden Philharmonic. With this orchestra, he was the first European orchestra after 1945 to undertake a concert tour to China.

Until 1965, he was conductor and Kapellmeister of the Thuringia State Symphony Orchestra Gotha, then chief conductor of the Suhl State Symphony Orchestra based in Hildburghausen, and elevated to Thüringen Philharmonie Suhl in 1979. He was involved in the association of the Singakademie and the Suhler Knabenchor. In addition to numerous guest tours in Europe and Asia, he formed the Philharmonie into an ensemble of international reputation. In 1980 Geißler retired from the position of chief conductor of the Suhl Philharmonic. According to his Stasi documents, his friendship with the painter Kurt W. Streubel was no longer tolerated by the cultural policy of the SED.

From 1980, Geißler worked as a freelance composer and conductor. He created 52 compositions, including eight symphonies, solo concertos, chamber music, choral works and electronic music. In his last creative period, he composed in twelve-tone technique. He dedicated his Sixth Symphony to his friend Streubel.

=== Art collector and art sponsor ===
In 1962, the relations between Geissler and the Ministry for State Security (MfS) as well as the Verband Bildender Künstler der DDR (VBK) turned cold. Painter and graphic artist Kurt W. Streubel (1921-2002) supported him from then on. After Streubel's sketches, he created his first joint drafts for "Antiopera". Conceived as a "spoken play with poetry set to music", it contained "8 more or less political songs". In 1969, together with the composer and personal friend Hans-Jürgen Thiers (1929), Geißler composed the oratorium "Der Mensch" after texts by the Lithuanian poet Eduardas Mieželaitis. For this purpose Streubel created a title page, the printing of which was prohibited by state authorities.

In the mid-1960s, Geißler met the painter and graphic artist Karl Meusel (1912–1986) in whose works he found inspiration for his compositions.

== Politics ==
=== Political commitment until 1990 ===
Already after his return from the Federal Republic to the GDR in 1951, Geißler intervened critically and arguably - much to the displeasure of the political leadership. In 1958, Geißler joined the SED. However, his attitude to party ideology prompted the MfS to launch a comprehensive surveillance and observation process (OV "Antipode") on Geißler.

Geißler became a member of the Volkskammer committee for the dissolution of the MfS/AfNS and district representative for the dissolution of the MfS/AfNS under the chairmanship of Joachim Gauck. After his withdrawal from the SED on 30 September 1989, Geißler was co-founder of the Citizens' Committee of Suhl, founder of the Citizens' Committee of the State of Thuringia, co-founder of the New Forum Suhl and South Thuringia and appointed citizen of the Round Table of the City of Thuringia.

=== Political commitment from 1990 ===
Geißler ran for the 1990 Thuringian state election on the common landesliste of the New Forum, the East German Green Party and Democracy Now and won a mandate. As the oldest elected member of parliament he chaired the constituent session of the first Landtag of Thuringia on 25 October 1990 in the Deutsches Nationaltheater and Staatskapelle Weimar. He was also one of the fathers of the current Thuringian constitution.

Geißler, together with Matthias Büchner as one of two representatives of the New Forum first belonged to the joint faction New Forum/Greens/Democracy Now. After their exclusion from the faction, which thereupon renamed itself Bündnis 90/Die Grünen Thüringen, Geißler and Büchner were fraktionslose Abgeordnete from 22 December 1992 until the end of the parliamentary term in 1994. Geißler and Büchner caused a scandal on 25 October 1993 at the Wartburg: The members of the Thuringian parliament voted on Thuringia's new constitution at the solemn state parliament session in the last reading. The necessary two-thirds majority was secured with the votes of the CDU, FDP and SPD deputies. The Council of Elders had stipulated that only the chairmen of the five state parliamentary groups should have speaking time. The two non-attached members of parliament did not agree. Matthias Büchner tried during the meeting to make himself heard, but was expelled by the president of the Landtag Gottfried Müller after three Ordnungsruf of the hall. Geißler left the meeting as a protest.

Geißler died in Suhl on 10 July 2014.

== Works ==
Geißler composed works in several genres, including:

- Eight symphonies and one unfinished symphony
- Double Concerto for cello, mezzo-soprano and orchestra
- Violin Concerto No. 1
- Violin Concerto No. 2
- Horn Concerto
- Lieder

== Legacy ==
- In 1994, Geißler gave the Staatsarchiv Meiningen his entire personal registry as a member of the state parliament. In 2009, the State Archives took over the second part of his political estate as a deposit, to which ten files with personal documents from the period from 1989 to 2005 belong.
- The artistic legacy, which consists mainly of sheets music in the form of original manuscripts and sound recordings, is kept in the Saxon State and University Library Dresden.

== Publications ==
Interviews were published:

- Holger Zürch [in German] (2006). "15 Jahre Thüringer Landtag im Rückblick einstiger Abgeordneter aus den Gründerjahren im Freistaat Thüringen". Mit freiem Volk auf freiem Grunde. Leipzig: Selfpublication at Engelsdorfer Verlag. pp. 65–78. ISBN 978-3-939404-01-9. – The interview with Siegfried Geißler can also be found online at Qucosa starting on page 30 in the e-Book of this book.
- Siegfried Geißler: Wer sich nicht engagiert, hat auch kein Recht zu schimpfen. Conversation (p. 11–26) in Holger Zürch Thüringens Gründerjahre. Gespräche mit Thüringer Abgeordneten über ihre Zeit im Landtag zwischen 1990 und 1999. Erfurt 2004, ISBN 3-931426-85-8 (volume 20 of the series Thüringen gestern & heute, published by the Bundesverband Deutscher Liebhaberorchester)
