= 1835 in music =

This article is about music-related events in 1835.

== Events ==
- January 2 – The Neue Leipziger Zeitschrift für Musik, edited by Robert Schumann, changes its name to Neue Zeitschrift für Musik.
- January 24 – Postponed premiere Vincenzo Bellini's I puritani in Théâtre-Italien Paris
- January 25 – Hector Berlioz becomes resident music critic for the Journal des débats.
- May 4 – Samuel Sebastian Wesley, son of the composer Samuel Wesley, grandson of Charles Wesley, and organist of Hereford Cathedral, elopes with and marries Mary Anne Merewether, sister of the cathedral's dean.
- June 4 – Franz Liszt joins his mistress, Marie d'Agoult, in Basel, Switzerland.
- July 8 – Dan Emmett is discharged from the US Army and begins his career as a blackface banjoist and singer.
- October – Contralto Clorinda Corradi relocates to Havana, Cuba.
- November 9 – At a concert in Johann Sebastian Bach's home city of Leipzig, Felix Mendelssohn, Clara Wieck and Louis Rakeman perform Bach's Concerto in D minor for three keyboards and orchestra.
- November 28 – 25-year-old Robert Schumann and 16-year-old Clara Wieck begin their romance.
- December 14 – The St James's Theatre, London, opens with an "operatic burletta", Agnes Sorel.
- Soprano Fanny Corri-Paltoni makes her last known stage appearance, at Alessandria in Italy.
- Gioachino Rossini completes Les soirées musicales which includes the patter song "La Danza".
- Music department added to the Prussian Academy of Arts in Berlin.

== Publications ==
- Luigi Cherubini – Cours de contrepoint et de fugue

== Classical music ==
- Frédéric Chopin – Ballade No. 1
- John Field – Nocturne No.14 in C major, H.60
- Mikhail Glinka – Mazurka in F major
- Fanny Hensel
  - Wand'l ich in dem Wald des Abends, H-U 283
  - Ich stand gelehnet an den Mast, H-U 284
  - Über allen Gipfeln ist Ruh, H-U 285
  - Wenn der Frühling kommt. H-U 286
  - Der Strauß H-U 287
- Franz Liszt
  - Duo (Sonata) on Polish Themes, for violin and piano, S.127
  - Réminiscences de La juive, for solo piano, S.409a
- Otto Nicolai – Gran marcia funebre
- Ferdinand Ries – Symphony No. 7
- Robert Schumann – Carnaval, Op. 9
- Alicia Anne Spottiswoode – "Annie Laurie"
- Giuseppe Verdi – Messa solenne (Messa di Gloria)
- Samuel Sebastian Wesley – Larghetto for Organ in F minor

== Opera ==
- Princess Amalie of Saxony – La casa disabitata
- Daniel Auber – Le cheval de bronze
- Vincenzo Bellini – I puritani
- Gaetano Donizetti
  - Lucia di Lammermoor
  - Maria Stuarda
- Fromental Halévy
  - L'éclair
  - La Juive
- Giuseppe Persiani – Ines de Castro
- Mikhail Zagoskin – Askold's Grave (Аскольдова могила, Askol’dova mogila)

== Births ==
- January 14 – Felix Otto Dessoff, conductor and composer (died 1892)
- January 23 – August Lanner, composer
- February 14 – Louis Gallet, librettist (died 1898)
- February 24 – John Henry Martin, band instrument manufacturer (died 1910)
- March 1 – Ebenezer Prout, composer (died 1909)
- March 15 – Eduard Strauss, composer (died 1916)
- March 24 – August Winding, composer (died 1899)
- March 30 – Bernhard Scholz, composer (died 1916)
- July 10 – Henryk Wieniawski, violinist and composer (died 1880)
- August 12 – Peter Piel, composer (died 1904)
- August 20 – Oscar Stoumon, music critic and composer (died 1900)
- September 28 – Jean Louis Gobbaerts, pianist (died 1886)
- October 7 – Felix Draeseke, composer (died 1913)
- October 9 – Camille Saint-Saëns, composer (died 1921)
- October 11 – Theodore Thomas, conductor (died 1905)
- November 25 – Joseph Glæser, organist and composer (died 1891)
- December 1 – Carl Johan Frydensberg, composer (died 1904)
- December 12 – Georges Jean Pfeiffer, composer (died 1908)
- date unknown – Abu Khalil Qabbani, Syrian dramatist and composer (died 1902)

== Deaths ==
- February 19 – Amzi Chapin, cabinetmaker, singing-school teacher and shape note composer
- April 23 – Joseph Antonio Emidy, violinist and composer (born 1775)
- April 25 – François Tourte, bowmaker (born 1747)
- May 9 – Sebastian Mayer, operatic bass (born 1773)
- August 3 – Wenzel Müller, composer (born 1767)
- August 10 – Claus Schall, violinist and composer (born 1757)
- September 23 – Vincenzo Bellini, composer (born 1801)
- October 21 – Muthuswami Dikshitar, youngest of the Carnatic music composer trinity (born 1775)
- November 19
  - Thomas Linley the elder, musician and founder of a musical dynasty (born 1733)
  - Abraham Mendelssohn Bartholdy, banker and father of Felix and Fanny Mendelssohn (born 1776)
