= Hochschule für Musik Carl Maria von Weber =

Education organization in Dresden, Germany

Coordinates: 51.054°N 13.725°E

- Type: Public
- Established: 1856
- Affiliations: Sächsische Staatskapelle Dresden, Semperoper, Dresden Philharmonic
- Principal: Rektor Prof. Lars Seniuk
- Students: c. 600
- Location: Wettiner Platz 13, Dresden, Saxony, Germany
- Campus: Urban
- Website: www.hfmdd.de

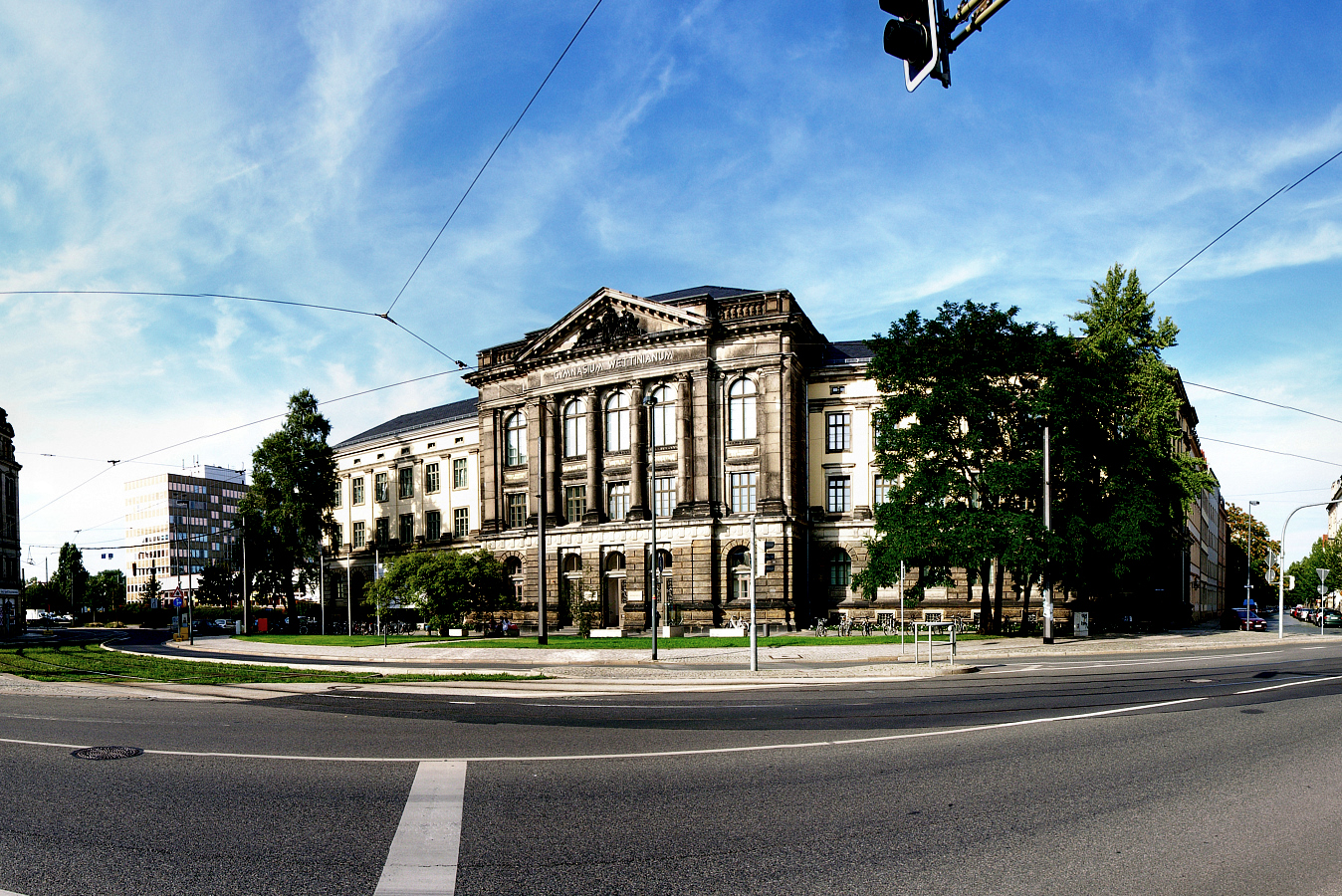
The main building in 2007

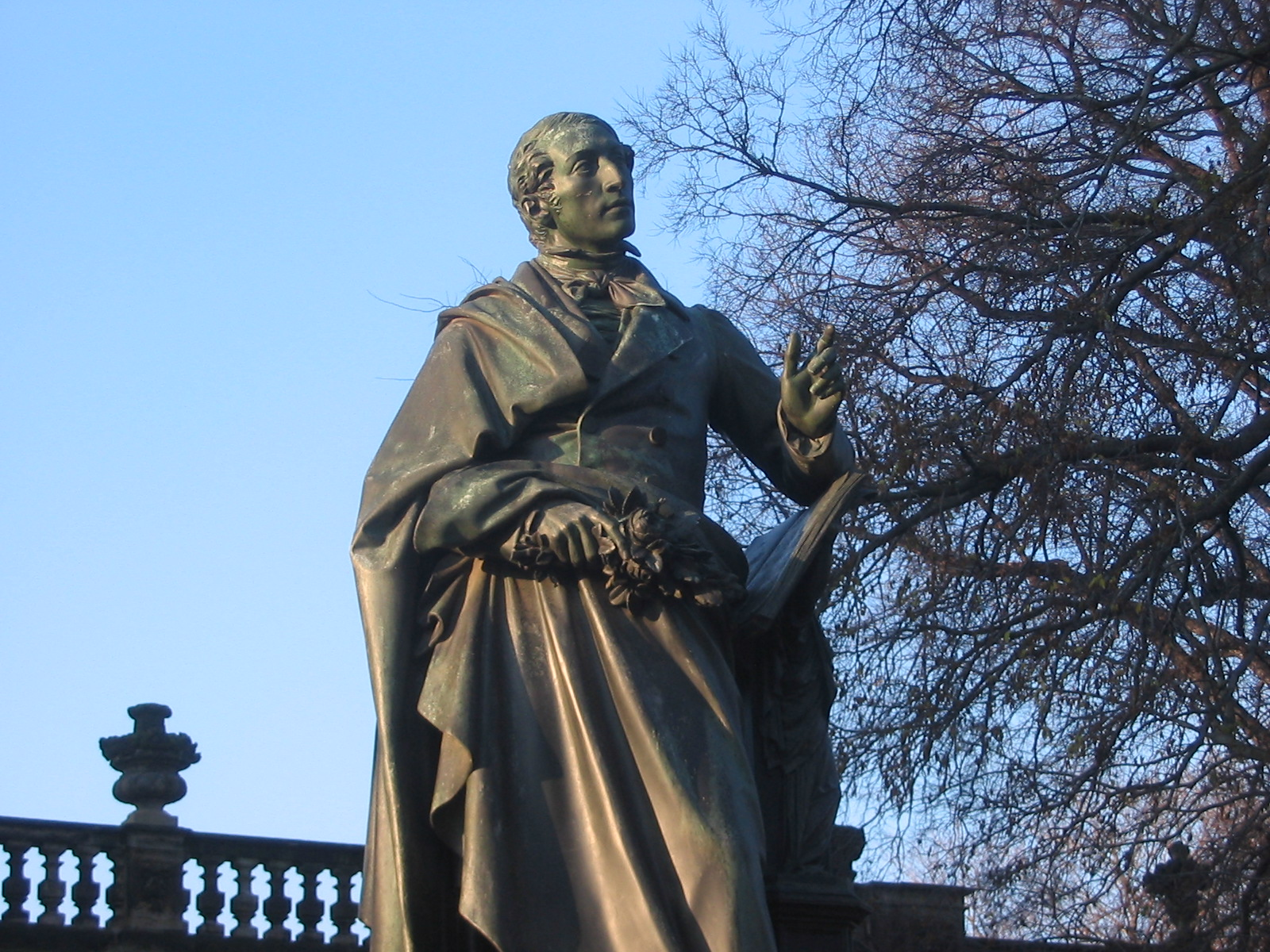
Statue of Weber, in Dresden

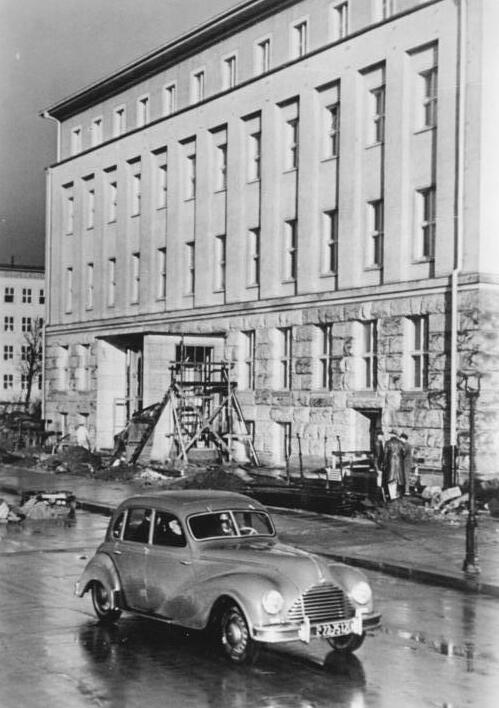
Hochschule für Musik 1952

The Hochschule für Musik Carl Maria von Weber (or Dresden University of Music Carl Maria von Weber; also/formerly known as Dresden Conservatory or Dresden Royal Conservatory) is a university of music in Dresden, Germany.

== History ==
The Hochschule opened on 1 February 1856 and is one of the oldest German conservatoires. Francesco Morlacchi, Carl Maria von Weber and Richard Wagner made reference to the necessity of establishing institutional training for musicians in Dresden. On 1 February 1856, a violinist of the Royal Orchestra, Friedrich Tröstler, founded the first music school in Dresden. In 1881 the title "royal" was granted, and it changed its name to "Royal Conservatoire", although it was a private institution. From 1881 till 1918 was an institution under royal patronage and from 1937 onwards under the municipal authority. The original building of the hochschule was destroyed during World War II and all teaching activities were moved to Mendelssohnalle 34. At first the university was an educational institution where the future instrumentalists of the town's orchestra were trained. It became the Hochschule für Musik; named after Carl Maria von Weber in 1959.

== Studies ==
All orchestral instruments, voice, piano, conducting, composition, music theory and accompaniment, as well as popular music/jazz/rock specialties can be studied at the music university. There are also different courses about Instrumental and Voice Pedagogy and Teacher Training in Music.

Particular emphasis is placed on the education of singers and orchestral musicians. This is because of the especial relationship of the school and the Semperoper, Staatskapelle Dresden, and the Dresden Philharmonic Orchestra. The formation of singers and orchestral musicians was strongly determined by members of the Saxon State Opera, The Staatskapelle and Philharmonic orchestras working as teachers on an honorary basis. There are c. 250 public events organized and realized by students and staff and guests lecturers every year.

== Facilities ==
The main building is located at 13 Wettiner Platz. It has all the facilities of a modern conservatoire, a large recital hall and several smaller ones, rehearsal and practice rooms, teaching studios, a canteen, a library and offices. A new extension to the main building, finished in 2008, houses a new 450-seat concert hall and several rehearsal and teaching rooms.

== Public performances ==
With more than 300 public concerts and opera performances every year, the Hochschule contributes greatly to the region's cultural life and offers its students at the same time a practical artistic training. Regular artistic projects are realized especially by the Opera Class and the bigger ensembles like the hochschule's Symphony Orchestra, the School's Choir and the Bigband. The special image of the Hochschule für Musik is fundamentally shaped by the close connection to Dresden's two big orchestras, the Sächsische Staatskapelle Dresden and the Dresden Philharmonic Orchestra. Furthermore, the Opera Class has a location at its disposal, which enables performances under professional conditions.

== High School of Music "Carl Maria von Weber" ==
Founded in 1965, but working as a different organization since 1945, the High School of Music "Carl Maria Von Weber" (German: Sächsisches Landesgymnasium für Musik "Carl Maria von Weber") is a specialist music school for school-age children, located in Dresden. The school imparts the regular school program but great emphasis is put on individual music training, music theory classes and orchestral playing. Most instrumental teachers are also professors at the Hochschule für Musik "Carl Maria von Weber" or play in one of the professional orchestras of the city. Among the former presidents of the school was the English conductor Sir Colin Davis. Previous patrons include Sir Yehudi Menuhin.

== Some distinguished alumni and staff ==
- Mark Andre (composer)
- Olaf Bär (singer)
- Andreas Bauer Kanabas (bass)
- Conny Bauer (jazz trombonist)
- Stefan Behrisch (jazz composer)
- Boris Blacher (composer)
- Theodor Blumer (conductor)
- Roland Bocquet (composer)
- Kurt Böhme (singer)
- Helmut Branny (conductor, double bassist and professor)
- Arthur Bruhns (composer)
- Till Brönner (jazz trumpeter)
- Walter Damrosch (conductor)
- Felix Draeseke (composer)
- Carl Ehrenberg (composer)
- Franz Eckert (composer)
- Alberto Franchetti (composer)
- Johannes Fritzsch (conducting)
- Siegfried Geißler (composer, conductor, hornist and politician)
- Hartmut Haenchen (conductor)
- John Holloway (baroque violinist)
- Annette Jahns (mezzo-soprano and opera director)
- Vladimir Jurowski (conductor)
- Herbert Kegel (conductor)
- Ekkehard Klemm (conductor)
- Tibor Kozma (conductor)
- Hermann Ludwig Kutzschbach (conductor)
- Viktoria Leléka (singer and composer)
- Christian Lillinger (jazz drummer)
- Otto Lohse (conductor)
- Claudia Mahnke (mezzo-soprano)
- Nils Mönkemeyer (violist)
- Ike Moriz (singer)
- Jean Louis Nicodé (pianist and conductor)
- Egon Petri (pianist)
- Stefan Prins (composer)
- Ludger Rémy (harpsichordist and conductor)
- Elisabeth Rethberg (singer)
- Karl Richter (harpsichordist and conductor)
- Peter Rösel (pianist)
- Petko Staynov (composer)
- Paul Schöffler (singer)
- Hanns-Herbert Schulz (singer and teacher)
- Günter Sommer (drummer)
- Sybille Specht (mezzo-soprano)
- Nadja Stefanoff (soprano)
- Carl David Stegmann (singer)
- Johannes Paul Thilman (composer)
- Thomas Thomaschke (bass singer)
- Hans Tutschku (composer)
- Annette Unger (violinist)
- Siegfried Vogel (operatic bass)
- Amadeus Webersinke (pianist)
- Jeanne You (pianist)
- Udo Zimmermann (composer, musicologist, opera director and conductor)
- Amir Shpilman (composer)

== Principals ==
- Karl Laux (1952–1963)
- Hans-Georg Uszkoreit (1963–1968)
- Siegfried Köhler (1968–1980)
- Max Gerd Schönfelder (1980–1984)
- Dieter Jahn (1984–1990)
- Monika Raithel (1990–1991)
- Wilfried Krätzschmar (1991–2003)
- Stefan Gies (2003–2010)
- Ekkehard Klemm (2010-2015)
- Judith Schinker (2015–2018)
- Axel Köhler (2019-2023)
- Lars Seniuk (2024-

== See also ==
- Sächsische Staatskapelle Dresden
- Semperoper
- Dresden Philharmonic Orchestra
