= Saffo (Pacini) =

Opera by Giovanni Pacini

- Opera by Giovanni Pacini
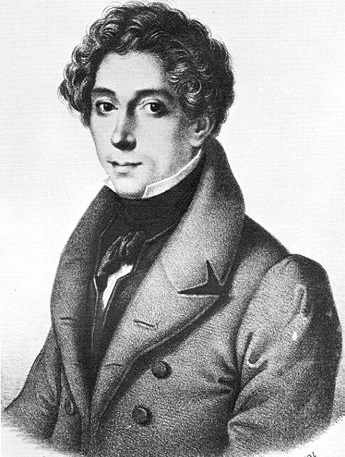
- Pacini
- Librettist: Salvadore Cammarano
- Language: Italian
- Based on: Play by Franz Grillparzer
- Premiere: 29 November 1840; Teatro San Carlo Naples

Saffo is an opera in three acts by Giovanni Pacini set to a libretto by Salvadore Cammarano, which was based on a play by Franz Grillparzer, after the legend of the ancient Greek poet Sappho.

== Performance history ==
The opera was first performed at the Teatro San Carlo in Naples on 29 November 1840, and was also given in Paris at the Théâtre-Italien on 15 March 1842. It was frequently performed during the 19th century. Its first UK presentation was on 1 April 1843 at the Theatre Royal, Drury Lane in London and, in the US in 1847 in New York.

It saw occasional revivals during the 20th century. Notable ones took place at the San Carlo on 7 April 1967, with Leyla Gencer, at Gran Teatre del Liceu onn June 1987, with Montserrat Caballé, and at the Wexford Festival in 1995 under Maurizio Benini with Carlo Ventre as Faone.

== Roles ==
Role	Voice type	Premiere cast, 29 November 1840 (Conductor: Antonio Farelli)
Saffo	soprano	Francilla Pixis
Climene	mezzo-soprano	Eloisa Buccini
Faone	tenor	Gaetano Fraschini
Alcandro	baritone	Giovanni Orazio Cartagenova
Dirce	soprano	Anna Salvetti
Lisimaco	bass	Michele Benedetti
Ippia	tenor	Napoleone Rossi

== Synopsis ==
Place: Greece
Time: Antiquity

During the Poetic Games at the 42nd Olympiad (about 608 BC) a woman poet named Saffo sings so effectively against the practice of tossing felons and undesirables from a cliff on the Island of Leucadia in the hope that Apollo will catch them before they drown in the sea (the Leucadian Leap) that the god's high priest, Alcandro, is driven away in contempt. He vows to get revenge. The priest come upon Faone, a suitor of Saffo given to jealousy. At Alcandro's prompting, Faone denounces Saffo for preferring the poet Alceo to himself.

Later, with Saffo and Apollo being in conflict, she cultivates a friendship with Climene, the daughter of Alcandro, in order to seek the priest's intercession with the god. Saffo agrees to sing at Climene's wedding, but when she finds that the husband-to-be is Faone, the poet completely loses self-control, tries to break up the wedding, vandalizes Apollo's altar and is driven away.

Saffo turns up on the clifftop at Leucadia, convinced that her continuing love for Faone is a curse from Apollo. She intends to throw herself off the cliff in the hope that the god will catch her and remove the painful love. As required by custom, she identifies herself to Ippias, the curator of the Leap. He gives her the go-ahead to jump but an old man idling nearby has heard everything. He recognizes Saffo as Alcandro's long-lost daughter and therefore Climene's sister. Alcandro, Climene and Faone arrive. There is a happy reunion until Ippias points out that Saffo has made an agreement with Apollo from which she cannot back out. Saffo accepts her fate, bids farewell to everybody, and jumps. Climene faints. Faone has to be restrained from jumping, too. Apollo, still angry with her, allows Saffo to drown.

== Recordings ==
Year	Cast (Saffo, Faone, Alcandro, Climene)	Conductor, Opera house and orchestra	Label
1967	Leyla Gencer, Tito del Bianco, Louis Quilico, Franca Mattiucci	Franco Capuana, Orchestra and chorus of the San Carlo Opera, Naples	Audio CD: Opera d'Oro; ASIN: B000EQ5Q4A
1995	Francesca Pedaci, Carlo Ventre, Roberto de Candia, Maria Pentcheva	Maurizio Benini, RTÉ National Symphony Orchestra (live performance at the Wexford Festival).	Audio CD: Marco Polo; ASIN: B00000465M
