= Michael Hampe =

German theatre director (1935–2022)

- Michael Hampe, c. 1990
- Born: 3 June 1935; Heidelberg, Baden, Germany
- Died: 18 November 2022 (aged 87); Zürich, Switzerland
- Education: Otto-Falckenberg-Schule; Heidelberg University
- Occupations: Theatre director; Opera director; Academic teacher; General manager
- Organizations: Mannheim National Theatre; Cologne Opera; Salzburg Festival; Dresden Music Festival; Hochschule für Musik und Tanz Köln

Michael Hampe (3 June 1935 – 18 November 2022) was a German theatre and opera director, general manager (Intendant) and actor. He developed from acting and directing plays at German and Swiss theatres including the Bern Theatre, to focus on directing opera and managing opera houses, first at the Mannheim National Theatre, then the Cologne Opera from 1975. He was professor at the Hochschule für Musik und Tanz Köln since 1977. Hampe was influential for both the Salzburg Festival and, after the reunification of Germany, the Dresden Music Festival for which he commissioned and directed world premieres. He directed at international opera houses and festivals, including productions recorded for television, film and DVD.

== Life and career ==
Born in Heidelberg on 3 June 1935, Hampe was the son of the architect Hermann Hampe and his wife Annemarie née Ebler. His grandfather was the historian Karl Hampe; his great-grandfather was the cultural historian Johannes Scherr. Hampe attended the humanist Gymnasium in Heidelberg. During this time he spent a year in the United States, where he studied chamber music as a cellist at Syracuse University, New York, with Louis Krasner. After graduation, he trained as an actor at the Otto-Falckenberg-Schule in Munich. He also studied dramatics and musicology at the Heidelberg University and in Munich. He studied further in Vienna with Heinz Kindermann, and submitted his doctoral dissertation on the development of stage technology.

Engagements as an actor and stage director in German and Swiss theatres followed. His time at the Bern Theatre between 1963 and 1965 proved key to his development as a director, where he staged works including Oedipus Rex by Sophocles, Molière's The Misanthrope, Goethe's Faust I, Brecht's Life of Galileo, Mozart's operas Idomeneo and Die Zauberflöte, and Heinrich Sutermeister's Der rote Stiefel.

From 1972 to 1975, Hampe was general manager and artistic director (Intendant) of the Mannheim National Theatre.

In 1975, Hampe was named general manager and artistic director of the Cologne Opera, a position he held for 20 years. During his tenure, the Cologne Opera became one of the leading opera houses in Europe. His productions of works by Richard Wagner and Gioachino Rossini are remembered, as well as his engagement for the operas of Benjamin Britten and Leos Janáček. His 1979 production of Cimarosa's Il matrimonio segreto became a worldwide success with performances in London, Paris, Edinburgh, Venice, Stockholm, Washington, Tokyo and Dresden, and was awarded international prizes including the Olivier Award. He returned to Cologne in the 2015/16 season to direct Puccini's La bohème, a season later Beethoven's Fidelio, and in the 2020/21 season Mozart's Die Zauberflöte.

Hampe was on the board of directors of the Salzburg Festival from 1983 until 1990, where he was the stage director for productions, often in collaboration with the scenic designer Mauro Pagano. His productions included the world premiere of Henze's adaptation of Monteverdi's Il ritorno d'Ulisse in patria in 1985, Don Giovanni conducted by Herbert von Karajan in 1987, Rossini's La Cenerentola conducted by Riccardo Chailly in 1988, and Le nozze di Figaro conducted by Bernard Haitink in 1991.

Hampe served as a guest director at major opera houses and festivals. For The Royal Opera, London, he directed Andrea Chénier (1984), and Rossini's The Barber of Seville (1985) and La Cenerentola (1990). Other organizations where he directed include La Scala in Milan, as well as in Paris, Munich, Athens, Stockholm, Helsinki, San Francisco, Los Angeles, Washington, Buenos Aires, Santiago de Chile, Sydney and Tokyo, and at festivals in Florence, Pesaro, Ravenna, Drottningholm, Edinburgh and Lucerne Festival. Many of his productions were recorded for television broadcast or made into films. The total number of his productions is more than 260 as of 2020.

After the Reunification of Germany, Hampe assumed the artistic direction of the Dresden Music Festival, which he led to new international recognition, together with Kim Ry Andersen as managing and deputy director. During his tenure from 1993 to 2000, he commissioned works from composers such as Siegfried Matthus (Farinelli, 1998) and Wilfried Maria Danner (Die Sündflut, 2002), directing their world premieres. His 2000 production of Handel's Serse at the Semperoper was recorded for the internet.

=== Teaching ===
Hampe was professor at the Hochschule für Musik und Tanz Köln since 1977. He also taught at numerous universities and academies in Germany and abroad, including Yale University and the University of Southern California (USC), as well as Europäische Akademie für Musik und Darstellende Kunst Palazzo Ricci, Montepulciano. Hampe was honorary board member of the European Music Theater Academy (EMA) in Vienna.

=== Theatre construction consultant ===
Hampe was in demand as a theatre construction expert and was vice president of the German Theatre Technology Society. He consulted for the buildings of the Opéra Bastille in Paris and the New National Theatre Tokyo, as well as renovation and modernisation of older theatres.

=== Death ===
Hampe died in Zürich on 18 November 2022, at the age of 87.

== Awards and distinctions ==
Hampe was awarded the Commander's Cross of the Order of Merit of the Federal Republic of Germany, the Goldenes Ehrenzeichen des Landes Salzburg and was named Commendatore of the Italian Republic. He was an honorary member of numerous organisations and federations.

== Works and publications ==
- Oper in Köln. Michael Hampe 1975–1995. Illustrations by Paul Leclaire, collaboration with Franz-Peter Kothes; Wienand Verlag, Cologne 1995, ISBN 978-3-87909-429-5.
- Alles Theater – Reden und Aufsätze. With illustrations by Mauro Pagano; Wienand Verlag, Cologne 2000, ISBN 3-87909-695-3.
- Oper – Spiel ohne Regel. Hollitzer Wissenschaftsverlag, Vienna 2013, ISBN 978-3-99012-100-9.
- Hat die Oper eine Zukunft? Ferdinand Schöningh Verlag, Paderborn 2013, ISBN 978-3-506-77300-5.
- Opernschule für Liebhaber, Macher und Verächter des Musiktheaters. Böhlau Verlag Vienna / Cologne / Weimar 2015, ISBN 978-3-412-22500-1.
  - English edition: The Crafty Art of Opera. The Boydell Press, Woodbridge 2016, ISBN 978-1-78204-700-1
  - Japanese edition: Opera no gakkō. Suiyosha Verlag, Tokyo 2017.
- Über Theater, Reden und Schriften. Wienand Verlag, Cologne 2015, ISBN 978-3-86832-259-0

== Archive and estate ==
Part of Hampe's archive is located in the University of Cologne's theatre collection, which will also receive and administer his complete theatrical estate.
