= Fantasy on Polish Airs (Chopin) =

Fantasy for piano and orchestra by Frédéric Chopin

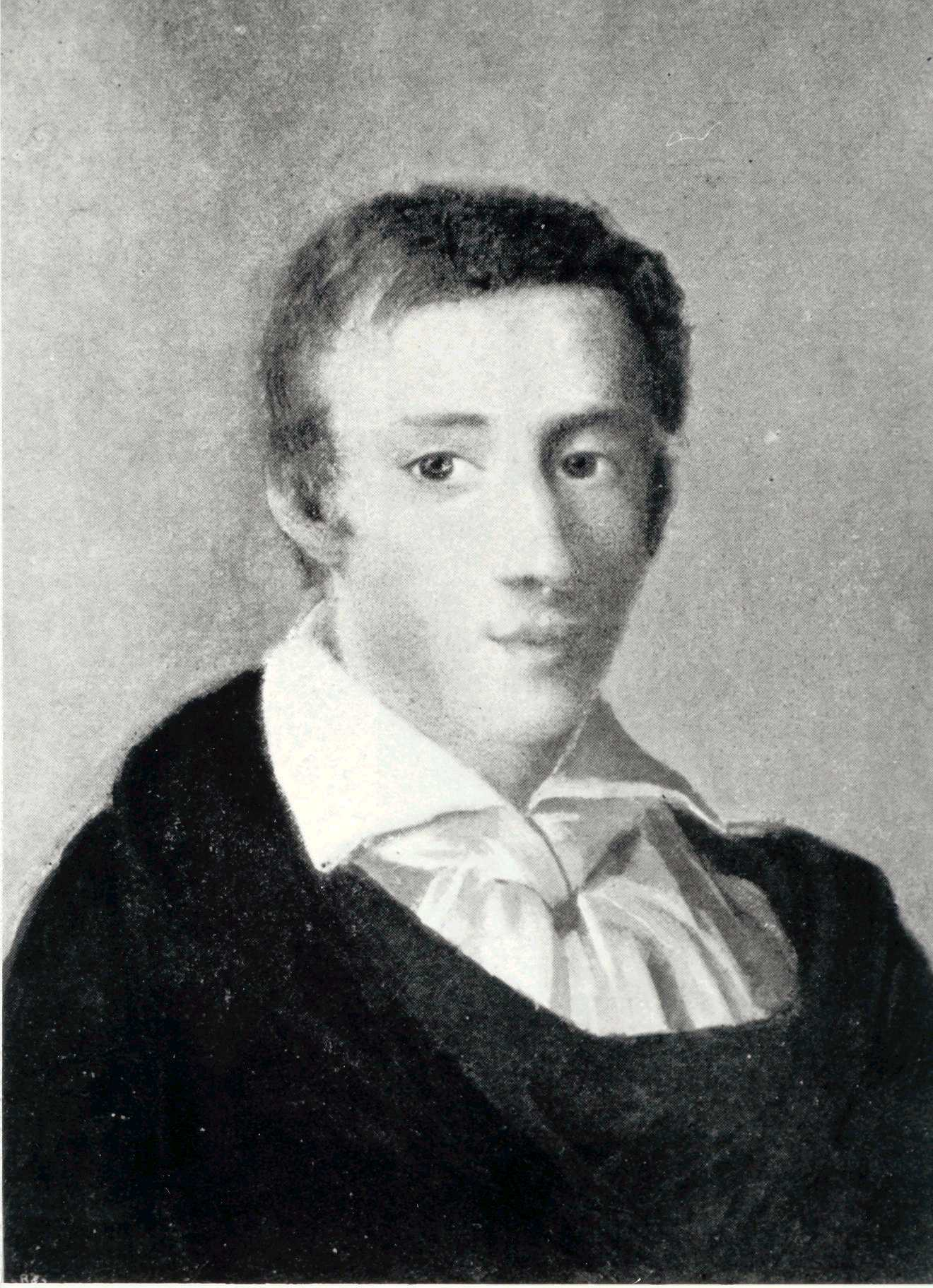
Frédéric Chopin, by Mieroszewski, 1829

Frédéric Chopin wrote six works for piano and orchestra, including two concertos. The Fantasy on Polish Airs in A major, Op. 13, was the second of his concertante works, written in 1828–30. The piece is also sometimes referred to as Fantasia on Polish Airs, Grande fantaisie or Fantaisie brillante. Chopin himself referred to it as his "Potpourri on Polish themes", and kept it in his repertoire for many years.

The Fantasy followed the highly successful Variations on "Là ci darem la mano", Op. 2 of 1827. It was written while a student of Józef Elsner at the Warsaw Conservatory.

== Structure ==
The orchestration calls for flutes, oboes, clarinets (in A), bassoons, horns (in A), trumpets (in D), timpani (A and E), piano and strings. The work contains three main themes, two of which are traditional folk melodies.

=== Introduction ===
The piece starts with a 55-measure introduction marked Largo non troppo. The introduction is in common time and concludes on a chord of the dominant seventh.

=== Już miesiąc zaszedł psy się uśpiły ===
The next section is based on "Już miesiąc zaszedł psy się uśpiły (A month has passed, the dogs slept)." This popular Polish folk song was sung to words from Franciszek Karpiński's idyll "Laura i Filon". Significantly, the song was a favorite of Chopin's mother. The section lasts from mm. 56 to 127. The meter is 6/8. The section begins in A major and ends on C♯ minor.

=== Theme de Charles Kurpinski ===
This section features a melody in the style of a dumka or possibly based on a Ukrainian duple-time round dance or kolomyjka, from an opera by Chopin's compatriot and friend Karol Kurpiński. According to Halina Goldberg, the dumka is a quotation from Kurpinski's Elegy on the Death of Tadeusz Kościuszko, which commemorated the death of this Polish hero in 1817. The section lasts from mm. 128 to 245. The meter is 2/4. The section begins on F♯ minor and ends on a G♯ minor triad.

=== Kujawiak ===
The piece is rounded out with a lively Kujawiak, "Jedzie Jasio od Torunia (Johnny Goes from Torun)". The kujawiak lasts from mm. 246 to 350. The meter is the typical 3/4.

=== Coda ===
The coda lasts from mm. 351 to 403. It features a great amount of style brilliante passage work for the piano.

== History ==
The Fantasy on Polish Airs was given its premiere on 17 March 1830, at the same concert in which the Piano Concerto No. 2 in F minor was first performed in public. It was played again on 11 October the same year, at the concert at which the Piano Concerto No. 1 in E minor was premiered.

The piece was dedicated to Johann Peter Pixis and first published in 1834.

A typical performance of the Fantasy on Polish Airs lasts around 15 minutes. There have been numerous recordings and occasional performances, but the work remains relatively little known.

== Sources ==
- Goldberg, Halina. 2008. Music in Chopin's Warsaw. New York: Oxford University Press.
- Strzyżewski, Mirosław. 2011. Much ado about Chopin: Discussion in the Warsaw Press from 1830 in Interdisciplinary Studies in Musicology 9 (pp. 19–29).
