= Nils Mönkemeyer =

German violist and academic teacher (born 1978)

- Born: 1978 (age 47–48); Holzwickede, West Germany
- Education: Hochschule für Künste Bremen; Musikhochschule Hannover; Hochschule für Musik und Theater München; Mozarteum
- Occupations: Violist; Academic teacher
- Organizations: Hochschule für Musik Carl Maria von Weber Dresden; Hochschule für Musik und Theater München
- Awards: Primrose International Viola Competition; Deutscher Musikwettbewerb; Echo Klassik
- Website: www.nilsmoenkemeyer.com

Nils Mönkemeyer (born 1978) is a German violist and academic teacher. He has recorded several CDs, of viola literature and arrangements for the viola, making it a respected solo instrument. He has been awarded several international prizes.

== Career ==
Born in Holzwickede the oldest child of the guitar player Thomas Brendgens-Mönkemeyer and his wife Heidemarie Mönkemeyer, he first studied the violin at the Hochschule für Künste Bremen. He switched to the viola in 1997, inspired by chamber music. He studied viola at the Musikhochschule Hannover with Christian Pohl. He continued his studies at the Hochschule für Musik und Theater München with Hariolf Schlichtig from 2000, graduating in 2003 with a diploma "mit Auszeichnung". He studied further from 2003 to 2004 at the Mozarteum in Salzburg with Veronika Hagen. He took his concert exam with Schlichtig in 2006, again "mit Auszeichnung".

Mönkemeyer first played an Italian viola by Giuseppe Cavaleri from 1742, a loan from the Landessammlung Rheinland-Pfalz. He plays now an instrument built by Peter Erben, Munich. For his first CD, Ohne Worte, he chose songs by Franz Schubert and Robert Schumann, playing them "without words", accompanied by Nicholas Rimmer. On his second CD, Weichet nur, betrübte Schatten, he recorded viola concertos by Antonio Rosetti and Franz Anton Hoffmeister, the Rosetti a premiere recording. He added arrangements of five vocal movements from Bach cantatas, for example the opening aria from the secular cantata for soprano solo Weichet nur, betrübte Schatten, BWV 202.

He was awarded many prizes, including in 2006 both the first prize of the International Yuri Bashmet Competition and the prize of the Deutscher Musikwettbewerb. In 2009 he was appointed professor of viola at the Hochschule für Musik Carl Maria von Weber Dresden. He has taught at the Musikhochschule München from 2011.

== Awards ==
- 2002: Sonderpreis Internationaler Instrumentalwettbewerb Markneukirchen Markneukirchen; scholarship of the Werner Richard-Dr. Carl Dörken foundation
- 2003: Förderpreis of the Da Ponte-Stiftung, Darmstadt; soloist prize and chamber music prize of the Klassikfestival Ruhr and the Ruhrtriennale, third prize Primrose International Viola Competition
- 2004: Lions-Rotary Solistenpreis; first prize Internationaler Violawettbewerb of the ORF, Vienna
- 2005: Carl-Flesch-Förderpreis of the Philharmonie Baden-Baden
- 2006: First prize International Yuri Bashmet Competition; prize of the Deutscher Musikwettbewerb; GWK-Förderpreis
- 2008: Soloist prize Elba Musikfestival
- 2009: Parkhouse Award (England); ECHO Klassik als "Nachwuchskünstler des Jahres" (newcomer of the year)
- 2010: ECHO Klassik for concerto of the year ("Konzerteinspielung des Jahres")

== Recordings ==
- 2009: Schubert/Mendelssohn/Schumann: Ohne Worte (with Nicholas Rimmer, piano); Weichet nur, betrübte Schatten (with the Dresdner Kapellsolisten, conducted by Helmut Branny)
- 2010: Brahms/Clara Schumann/Robert Schumann: In dunklen Träumen (with Nicholas Rimmer, piano)
- 2011: Telemann/Corelli/Bach/Delalande: Folia (with the Kammerakademie Potsdam)
- 2013: Johann Sebastian Bach, Krysztof Penderecki and Marco Hertenstein. Bach und Mehr
