= Francilla Pixis =

German opera singer

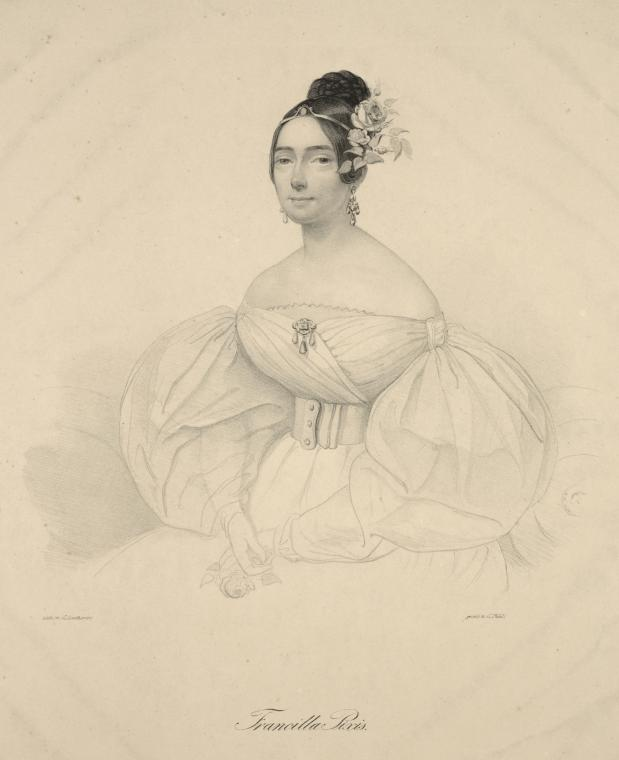
Francilla Pixis

Francilla Pixis (15 May 1816 – ?1888) was a German mezzo-soprano. She was born Franziska Helma Göhringer in Lichtenthal near Baden-Baden. She was initially trained by the pianist and composer Johann Peter Pixis who adopted her when she was 15 but also studied with Henriette Sontag and Ferdinando Paer. She made her concert debut in London in 1833 and her operatic debut in 1834 in Karlsruhe. She subsequently sang in Vienna, Paris, London, and Italy both on the opera stage and in successful concert tours with her adoptive father. In Italy she made her La Scala debut in 1838 in the title role of Rossini's La Cenerentola and also sang at the Teatro San Carlo in Naples and the Teatro Massimo in Palermo. In 1840 she created the title role in Giovanni Pacini's Saffo, which he wrote expressly for her voice. Pixis married a Sicilian nobleman, Giovanni di Sant'Onofrio del Castillo, in 1843 and retired from the stage three years later. Their son, Ugo di Sant'Onofrio del Castillo, served in the Italian Parliament, first in the Chamber of Deputies from 1888 until 1913 and later in the Senate.
