= Jan Vogler =

German cellist

Jan Vogler (born February 18, 1964) is a German-born classical cellist who lives in New York City.

Born in East Berlin, he studied first with his father Peter Vogler and subsequently with Josef Schwab in Berlin, Heinrich Schiff in Basel and Siegfried Palm. At the age of 20 he won the principal cello position of the Staatskapelle Dresden, becoming the youngest player in the history of this orchestra to hold that position. He left the position in 1997 to pursue a solo career, moving to New York with his wife, violinist Mira Wang and their two children.

In New York in 2010, he was a soloist with the Naumburg Orchestral Concerts, in the Naumburg Bandshell, Central Park, in the summer series.

There he befriended Bill Murray who joined him in 2017 for a musical recital in the Kulturpalast (Dresden). The program, titled "New Worlds", was recorded for Decca Records, Murray's debut album, and toured in Germany and America, including the Elbphilharmonie in Hamburg and Carnegie Hall in New York City.

German composer Jörg Widmann dedicated his cello concerto Dunkle Saiten (Dark Strings, 2000) to Vogler. Vogler has performed as soloist with the New York Philharmonic, Chicago Symphony Orchestra, Boston Symphony Orchestra, Pittsburgh Symphony Orchestra, Montreal Symphony Orchestra, Cincinnati Symphony Orchestra, Mariinsky Theatre Orchestra, Staatskapelle Dresden, Bavarian Radio Symphony Orchestra, Stuttgart Radio Symphony Orchestra, Taiwan Philharmonic (NSO), and Vienna Symphony. His regular recital partners include Hélène Grimaud.

He is a Sony recording artist, and his discography includes the Cello Suites of Johann Sebastian Bach, the Dvořák Cello Concerto with the New York Philharmonic, the Schumann Cello Concerto, and other major works.

His cello is the Castelbarco/Fau, made by Stradivari in 1707.

== Awards ==
- 2002: Echo Klassik Instrumentalist of the Year
- 2006: Echo Klassik, Chamber Music Recording of the Year, Mozart Divertimento, K. 563
- 2011: Erich-Kästner-Preis (Dresden)
- 2014: Echo Klassik Instrumentalist of the Year

== Partial discography ==
- 2004: Cello Concertos. (Rundfunk-Sinfonieorchester Saarbrücken, conducted by Thomas Sanderling, Edel Classics).
- 2005: Ludwig van Beethoven and Robert Schumann: The Works for Cello and Piano (Vol. 1–3, Edel Classics).
- 2005: The Secrets of Dvořak's Cello Concerto. (New York Philharmonic, conducted by David Robertson, Sony BMG Music Entertainment (Germany)).
- 2006: W.A. Mozart: Divertimento, K. 563. (Moritzburg Festival, Sony BMG Music Entertainment (Germany)).
- 2007: my tunes. (Dresdner Kapellsolisten, conducted by Helmut Branny, Sony BMG Music Entertainment (Germany)).
- 2007: Concerti brillanti. (Münchener Kammerorchester, Sony BMG Music Entertainment (Germany)).
- 2009: Jan Vogler – the Cellist. (Portrait, Edel Classics).
- 2009: New Worlds. (The Knights chamber orchestra, conducted by Eric Jacobson, Sony Music Entertainment).
- 2009: experience: live from new york. (The Knights, Eric Jacobson, Sony Music Entertainment).
- 2010: My tunes 2. (Dresdner Kapellsolisten, conducted by Helmut Branny, Sony Music Entertainment).
- 2012: Johann Sebastian Bach Cello Suites Sony Music Entertainment.
- 2017: New Worlds. (With Bill Murray, Decca Gold).
- 2022: The Dvorak Album. (With Tiffany Poon, Kevin Zhu, Chad Hoopes, Matthew Lipman and Juho Pohjonen, Sony Classical).
