= Ekkehard Klemm =

German conductor

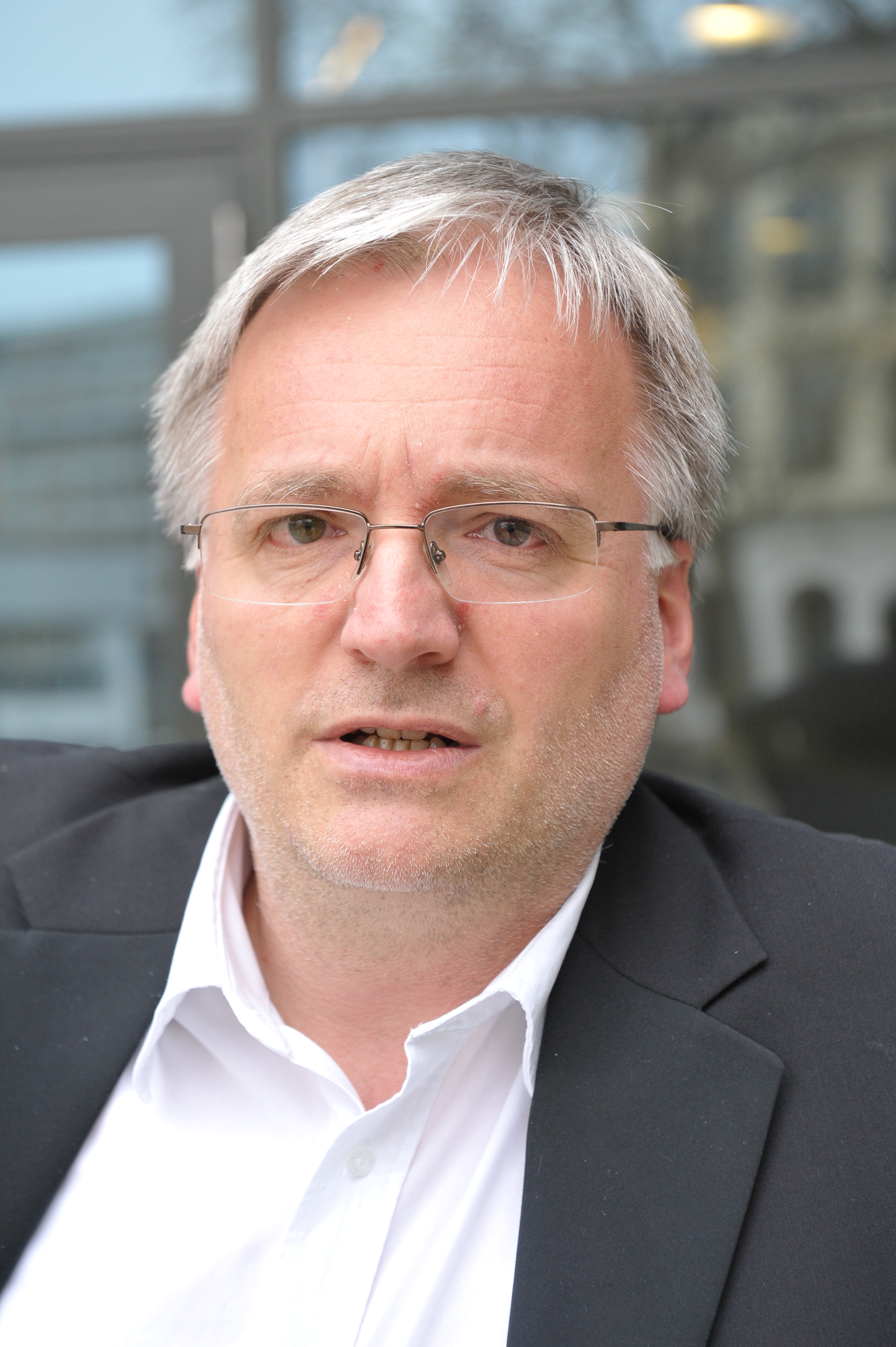
Ekkehard Klemm

Ekkehard Klemm (born 1958) is a German conductor.

== Biography ==
Klemm was born in Karl-Marx-Stadt, East Germany (now Chemnitz, Germany), and studied conducting, composition and piano at the Hochschule für Musik Carl Maria von Weber Dresden. He served as principal conductor of the Opera House in Greifswald (1988–94), chief conductor of the Vorpommern Theater and conductor of the Staatstheater at the Gärtnerplatz in Munich until 1999.

In 2003 Klemm was appointed first principal teacher of conducting at the Hochschule für Musik Carl Maria von Weber Dresden.
