= Bundesverband Deutscher Liebhaberorchester =

The Federal Association of German Amateur Orchestras (Bundesverband Deutscher Liebhaberorchester e.V. abbreviated BDLO) was established in 1924. It is the world's oldest association of symphonic and chamber orchestras. With about 810 orchestras (symphonic orchestras, chamber orchestras, ensembles of chamber music and salon orchestras) and their 30,300 performers, it is one of the largest national associations of this type. Alongside associations from other countries, such as Switzerland, the Netherlands, the Czech Republic, Norway, and Austria, it is also a member of the EOFed (European Orchestra Federation) and its international network of national music libraries.

The BDLO Library specializes in materials for symphonic and chamber orchestras. Its vast collection currently includes around 6,200 music pieces in 12,000 editions.
