= Johann Peter Pixis =

German pianist and composer

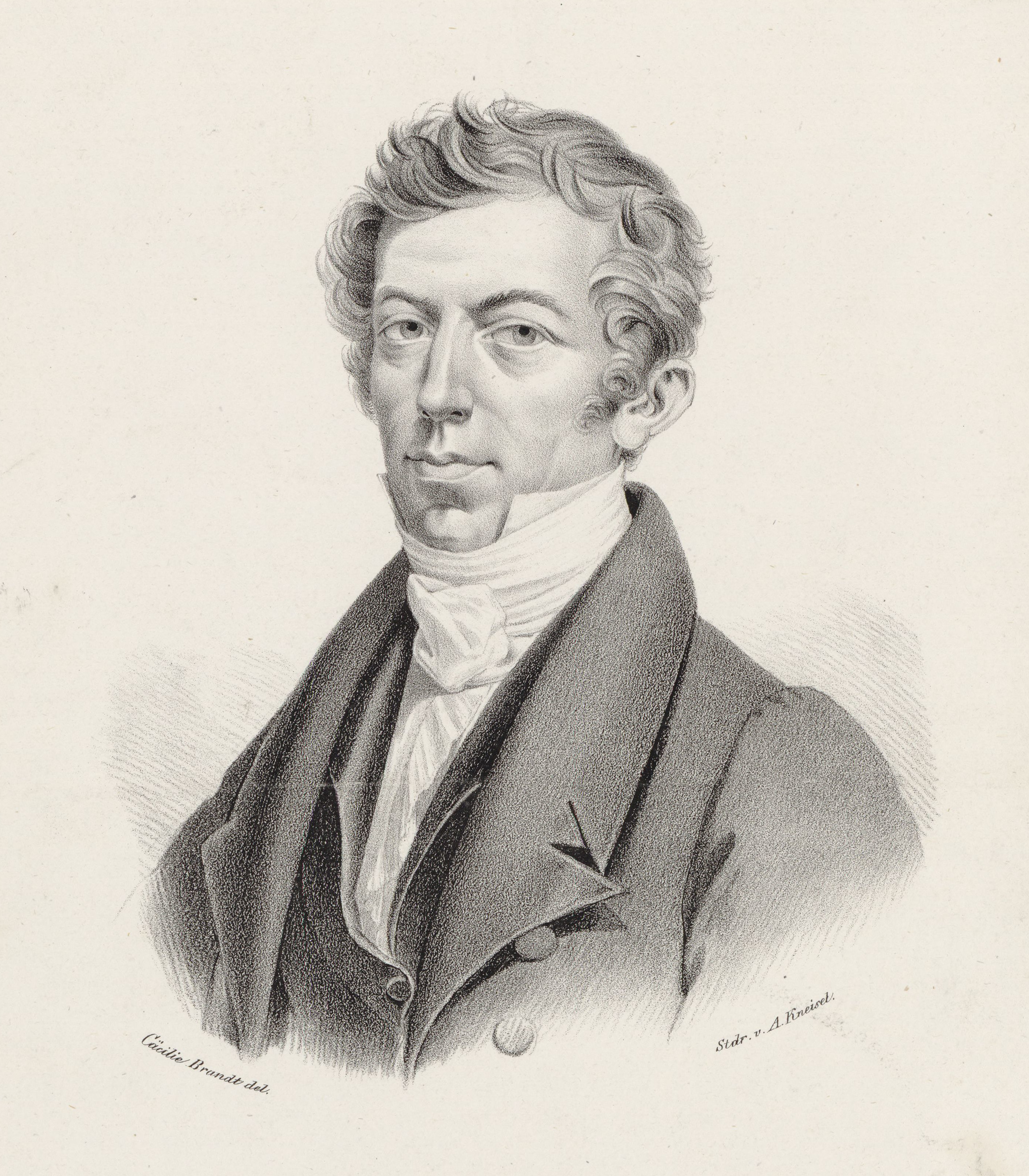
Johann Peter Pixis

Johann Peter Pixis (10 February 1788 – 22 December 1874) was a German pianist and composer, born in Mannheim. He lived in Vienna from 1808 to 1824, then in Paris to 1840, during which time he was among the city's most prominent pianists and composers, although he is almost entirely forgotten nowadays.

== Biography ==
He was the son of Friedrich Wilhelm Pixis (1755–1805), who in 1790 followed his own father to become Preceptor and Organist at the Evangelical Reformed Church. Johann Peter's older brother, also Friedrich Wilhelm Pixis (1785–1842), was a violinist who later became prominent in the musical life of Prague.

The two brothers received early musical training from their father, who took the talented boys on concert tours beginning in 1797; they traveled through Germany and to Denmark, Russia (St. Petersburg), and Poland (Warsaw). During the tour, the older brother also played piano duets with Johann Peter, who in turn accompanied his brother on the cello and violin. While in Hamburg in 1798, Viotti was so impressed by Friedrich Wilhelm junior that he gave daily lessons, which Johann Peter also attended, for two months, and he organized a concert for the two boys.

Friedrich Wilhelm senior moved his family to Vienna in 1806. The brothers gave a series of very successful concerts in Karlsbad and Prague in 1807, during which Johann Peter began to perform his own compositions. From 1808, the brothers were with their family in Vienna. Both studied composition under Johann Georg Albrechtsberger and made contact with the city's music professionals. Friedrich Wilhelm junior moved to Prague in 1810, while Johann Peter settled in Vienna, where he had contact with, among many others, Beethoven and Schubert. In 1814–15, he met Giacomo Meyerbeer, who was in Vienna to study with Antonio Salieri. In his memoirs, Pixis writes about his friendship with Meyerbeer:

Meyerbeer arrived in Vienna with an already established reputation as a pianist. We soon became acquainted, and after learning to know one another better a mutual inclination arose, which later developed into a proper and lasting friendship. He remained for some time in Vienna, worked hard and eventually wrote a one-act opera. . . Shortly thereafter he left Vienna, went to Italy, and I saw him next in Paris, when he returned from Italy crowned with fame.

Pixis also writes in glowing terms about the Vienna premiere of Carl Maria von Weber's Der Freischütz, and he relates a story about Henriette Sontag when she first arrived in Vienna as a young student: Pixis says that he split the cost of voice and Italian lessons with her, to enable her to afford them. Eventually, during his final years in Vienna, Pixis tried to establish himself as an opera composer, but with little success.

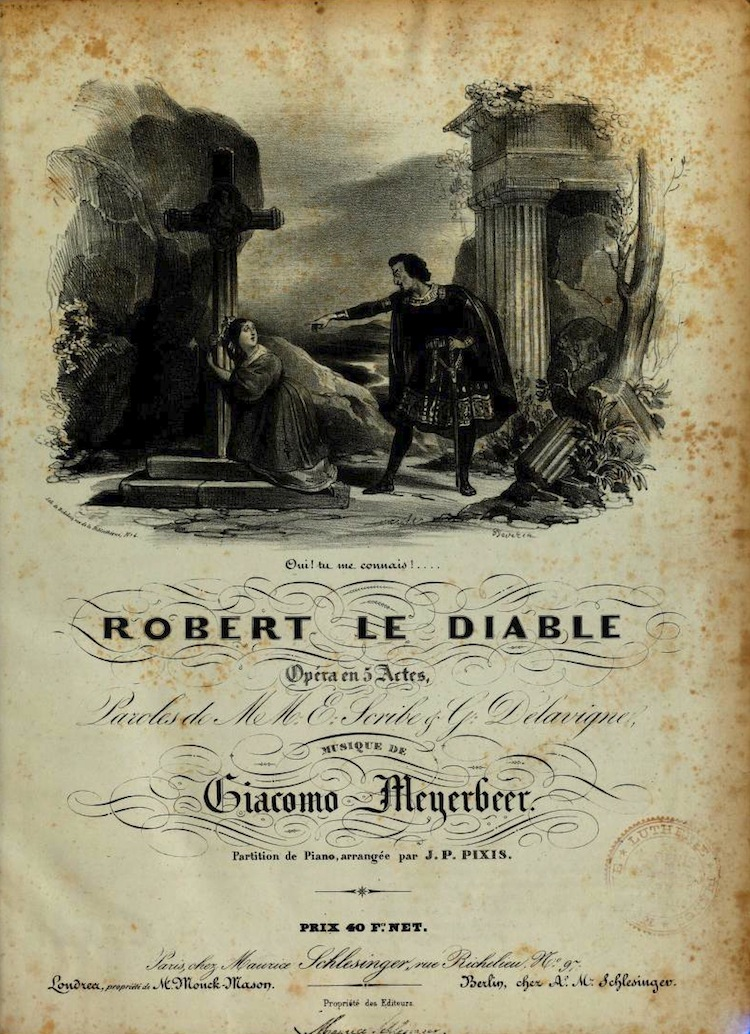
Cover of the vocal score for Meyerbeer, Robert le diable, with piano reduction by Pixis (1831).

Perhaps as a result of his early experiences with his brother, Pixis was an excellent collaborative pianist and toured with several violinists, including concerts in Paris, where he moved in late 1824. During this period Paris saw an influx of foreign musicians, especially pianists from Germanophone countries, a process that had already started in the 1790s, shortly after the founding of the Paris Conservatoire. The pianists included Friedrich Kalkbrenner (in 1799), Jan Ladislav Dussek (1807), Henri Herz (1816), Franz Hünten (1819), Franz Liszt (1823), Frédéric Chopin (1831), Sigismond Thalberg (1836), as well as Stephen Heller, Ferdinand Hiller, and others. Pixis stayed, living in Paris for twenty years and quickly earning a strong reputation as a composer, concert pianist, and chamber music collaborator. At the height of his career, around 1830, he was regarded as one of the best pianists of his time. According to Chopin, it was Pixis who introduced him to the publisher Schlesinger, whose request for a composition on Meyerbeer's "Robert" eventually resulted in the Grand duo concertant sur des thèmes de Robert le diable, B.70, published in 1832. Pixis himself made the piano reduction for the opera's vocal score (1831) and he wrote two original compositions: Caprice dramatique sur 'Robert le diable', Op. 116, and Variations sur le Quatuor de Robert le diable, Op. 117. All of these were also published by Schlesinger.

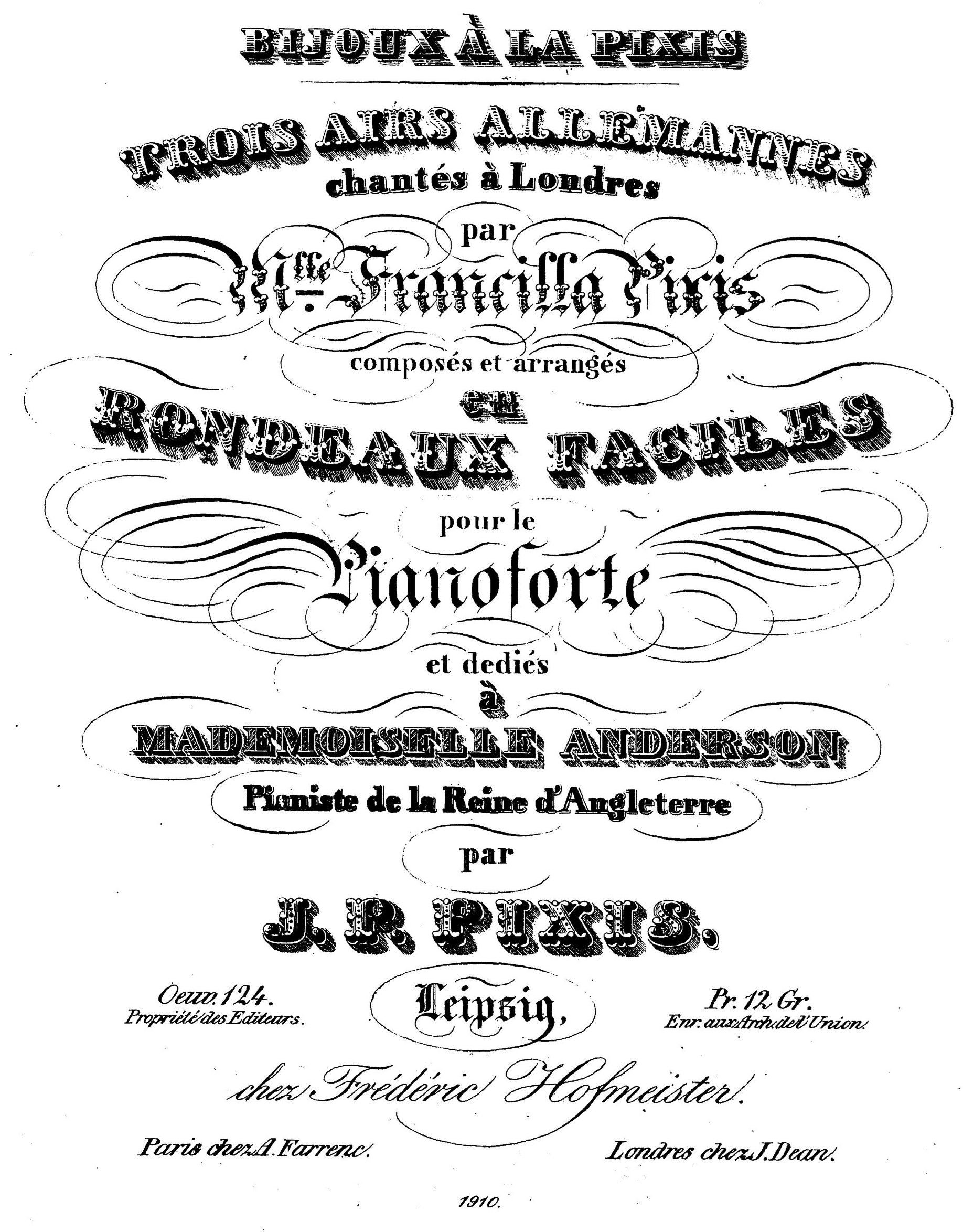
Pixis, Three German Airs, title page. Sung in London by his adopted daughter Francilla.

While in Paris, Pixis trained his adopted daughter Francilla Pixis (1816–1888), who became a well-known singer; her recital appearances were accompanied by Pixis himself.

In 1840, Pixis's compositional and performance career largely behind him, he moved to Baden Baden. In 1843, Francilla married and not long after that retired from the stage. Pixis then turned his attention to the musical training of his nephew Theodor Pixis (1831–1856), who subsequently became concertmaster in Cologne and instructor in the Rheinische Musikschule but died suddenly. Johann Peter Pixis continued to teach the piano until his death in 1874.

== Works ==
The opus numbers of Pixis's published works run to about 150, a total not unusual for the era, and include compositions in a variety of genres but especially chamber music, as well as music for piano solo and piano four-hands. The strongest of his multi-movement concert works are the seven piano trios, published between 1825 (Trio no. 1, Op. 75) and 1845 (Trio no. 7, Op. 147).

While still in Vienna, Pixis was asked to join the collaborative work (involving 51 composers from 1819–1823) Vaterländischer Künstlerverein, an anthology of variations on a waltz by Anton Diabelli, which also included Ludwig van Beethoven's Diabelli Variations. In Paris in 1837, Pixis was involved with the composition of Hexaméron (six composers contributed; the third variation on Bellini's theme is by Pixis). The fact that he was asked by Liszt to participate, along with Chopin, Czerny, Herz, and Thalberg, is evidence of his status in Parisian musical circles.

Ferdinand Hiller dedicated his 3 Caprices ou Etudes Caracteristiques, Op. 4 (1829) to Pixis. Frédéric Chopin dedicated to Pixis his Fantasy on Polish Airs for piano and orchestra, Op. 13, on its publication in 1834.

=== Operas ===
- Almazinda: Die Höhle Sesam (Vienna, 1820)
- Die Zauberspruch (Vienna, 1822)
- Bibiana: Die Kapelle im Walde (Aachen, 1829; Paris, Prague, 1830)
- Die Sprache des Herzens (Berlin, 1836)

=== Chamber music (selected) ===
- Violin Sonata, Op. 14
- Sonata for Flute or Violin, Op. 17
- Violin Sonata, Op. 24
- 7 Grand trios for piano, violin, and cello, Opp. 75, 86, 95, 118, 129, 139, 147
- Piano quintet, Op. 99 (1827)

=== Piano (selected) ===
- Grandes variations militaires for two pianos and orchestra (or string quartet), Op. 66
- Concertino for Piano and Orchestra in E-flat major, Op. 68 (1824/25)
- Concerto for Piano and Orchestra in C major, Op. 100
- Sonata in C minor, Op. 10 (1824 or earlier)
- Many fantasias, rondos, and variations, including Rondino on the Ranz des vaches d'Appenzell of Meyerbeer, Op. 94 (at latest 1827); Variations brillantes, Op. 112 (c. 1830); Rondo "Les trois clochettes," Op. 120; Fantaisie dramatique pour le piano à quatre mains sur des motifs des Huguenots de Meyerbeer, op. 131 (1836?); Fantaisie avec variations sur un duo de L'eclair de Halevy, Op. 133 (1837)

=== Arrangements by Pixis ===
- Louis Spohr, Faust, piano reduction/vocal score (1830)
- Giacomo Meyerbeer, Robert le diable, piano reduction/vocal score (1831)
