= Dresden Music Festival =

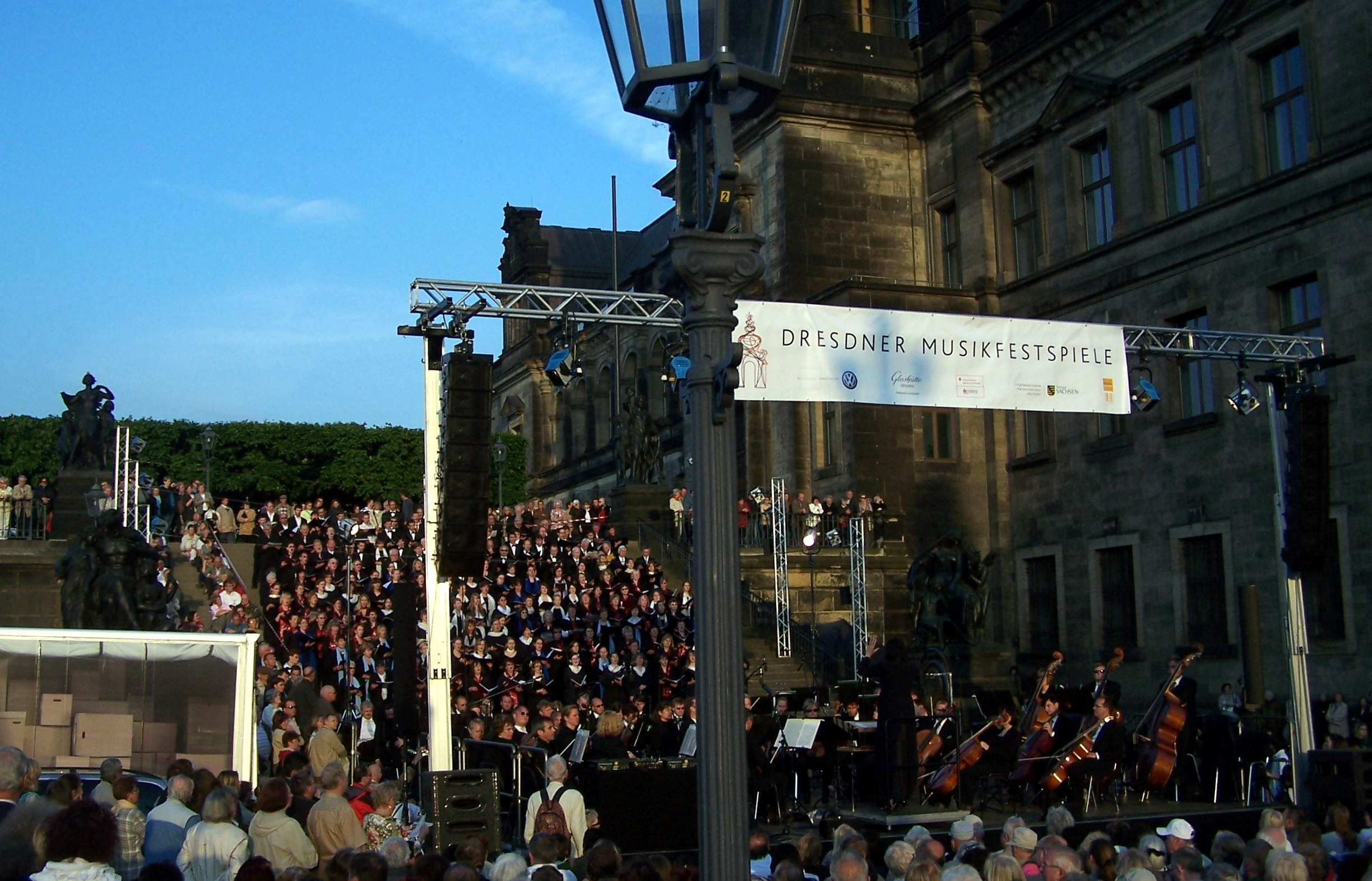
Open-air concert as part of the Dresden Music Festival 2010 near Brühl's Terrace

The Dresden Music Festival (German: Dresdner Musikfestspiele) is an annual music festival which takes place in Dresden, Germany in May and June. Although classical music, including contemporary classical music, forms the core of its performances, world music, jazz, and dance are also presented. One of its hallmarks is that the choice of repertoire is built on a specific theme which changes each year. The festival was established by government decree in 1978 when Dresden was still part of the German Democratic Republic. The German cellist Jan Vogler has been its artistic director since 2009.

The performances are held at a variety of venues in the city, including many baroque buildings destroyed in the bombing of World War II and since rebuilt, including the Semperoper opera house, the Dresden Frauenkirche, and the summer palace and grounds of the Großer Garten. Among the opera rarities presented at the festival have been Richard Strauss's Feuersnot, a co-production with the Dresden Semperoper nominated for the 2015 International Opera Awards, and Princess Amalie of Saxony's La casa disabitata, which received its first performance in the 177 years following its premiere during the 2012 festival.

== Management ==
Since 2009 is Jan Vogler artistic director of the Dresden Music Festival. Before it was Hartmut Haenchen (2002–2008), Torsten Mosgraber (interim/2001–2002), Michael Hampe (1993–2000), Mattis Dänhardt (1991–1992) and Winfried Höntsch (1977–1991).

From 1994 to 2012, Kim Ry Andersen, who studied law and business administration, was deputy director and managing director, who came from the Danish Ministry of Culture and the Royal Danish Theater.
