= Oboe Concerto (attributed to Haydn) =

1790 composition credited to Joseph Haydn

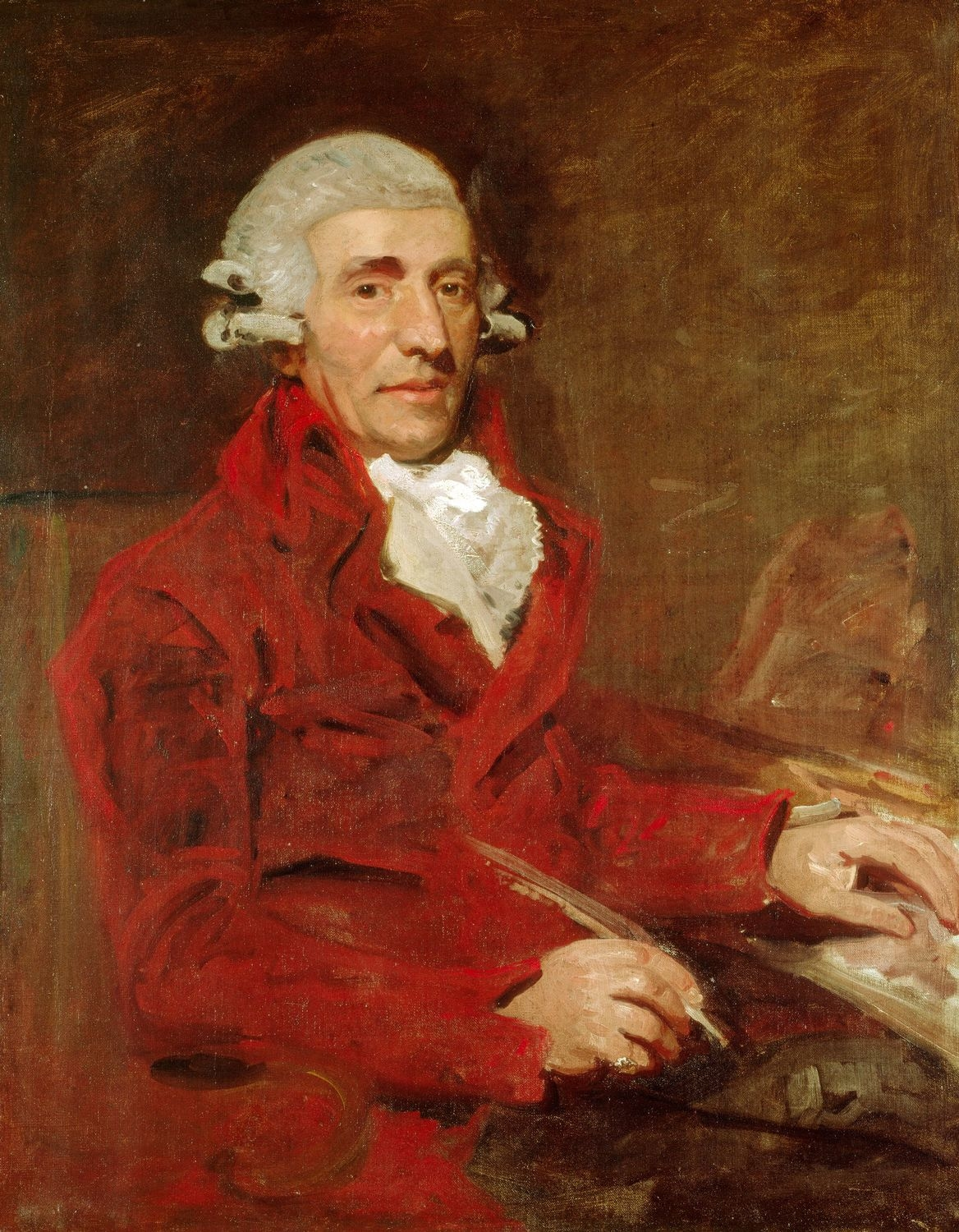
Joseph Haydn as portrayed by John Hoppner in England in 1791

The Oboe Concerto in C major, H. VIIg:C1, commonly attributed to Joseph Haydn, was most likely composed around 1790. However, modern musicologists agree that Haydn did not write the concerto.

== Structure ==
The work is composed of three movements:

1. Allegro spirituoso
2. Andante in F major
3. Rondo: Allegretto

Full performances last about 22 minutes.

Charles-David Lehrer believed that the first movement of the concerto was similar to the oboe concertos of Johann Christian Fischer, Johann Christian Bach, and Carl Stamitz, also arguing that it was similar in structure to the Johann Stamitz and Carl Philipp Emanuel Bach, even though the Haydn concerto had a contrasting B theme.

== Authorship ==
Though commonly attributed to Haydn, the authorship of the concerto has come into dispute. In the 1950s, Anthony van Hoboken included the concerto in his catalogue of Haydn's work. However, when Haydn's worklist was discovered in 2008, the concerto was not included.

The MGG and the Haynes Catalog of oboe music list the concerto as being the work of Ignaz Malzat.
