= Symphony No. 21 (Mozart) =

1772 composition by W. A. Mozart

- by W. A. Mozart
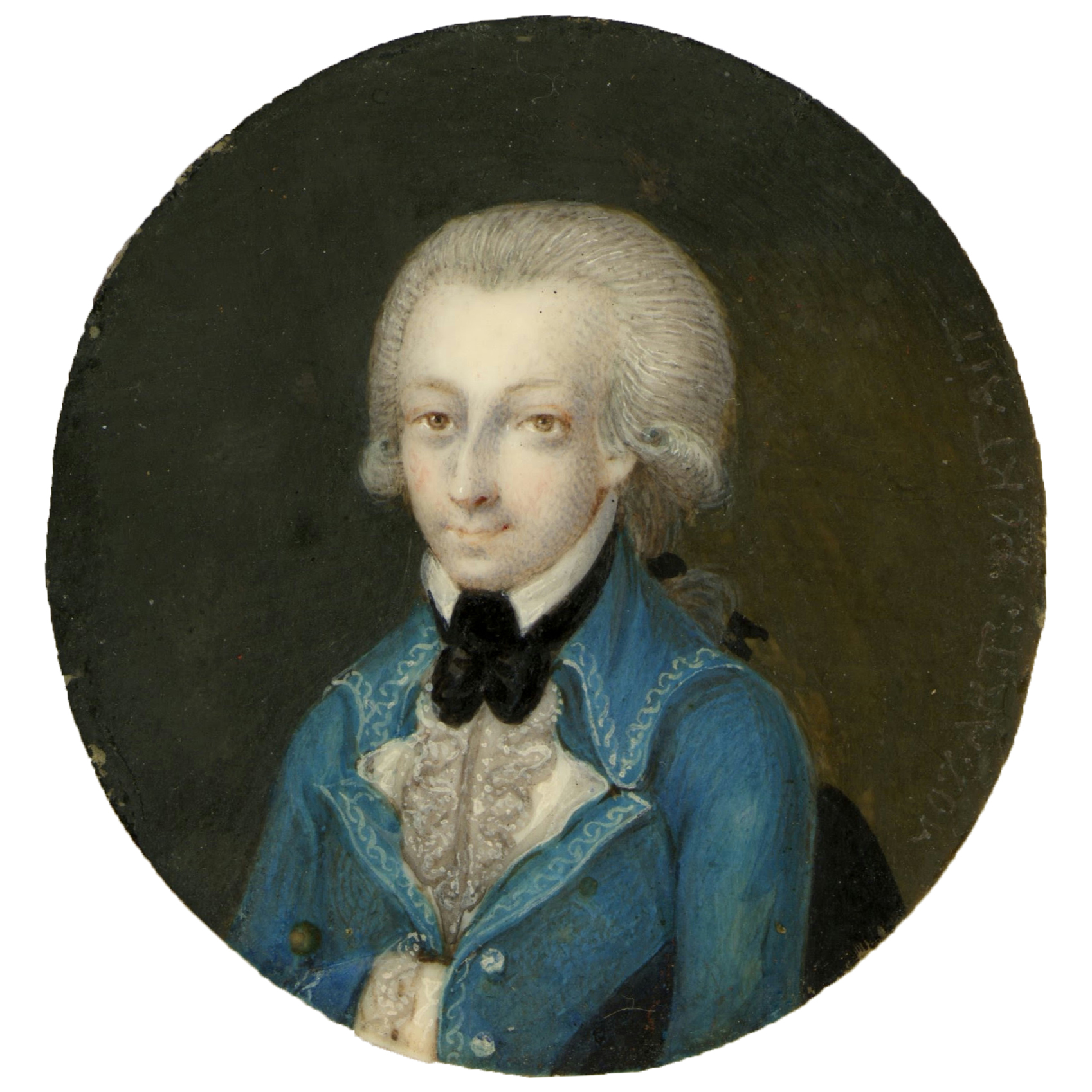
- Mozart in 1773, portrait by Martin Knoller
- Key: A major
- Catalogue: K. 134
- Composed: August 1772
- Duration: c. 19 minutes
- Movements: 4
- Scoring: Orchestra

Symphony No. 21 in A major, K. 134, is a symphony composed by Wolfgang Amadeus Mozart in August 1772, when he was sixteen.

== Structure ==
The symphony is scored for two flutes, two horns, and strings.

There are four movements:

1. Allegro, 3/4 in A major
2. Andante, 2/4 in D major
3. Menuetto – Trio, 3/4 in A major
4. Allegro, 2/2 in A major
