= Mozart Festival Würzburg =

Classical music festival in Germany

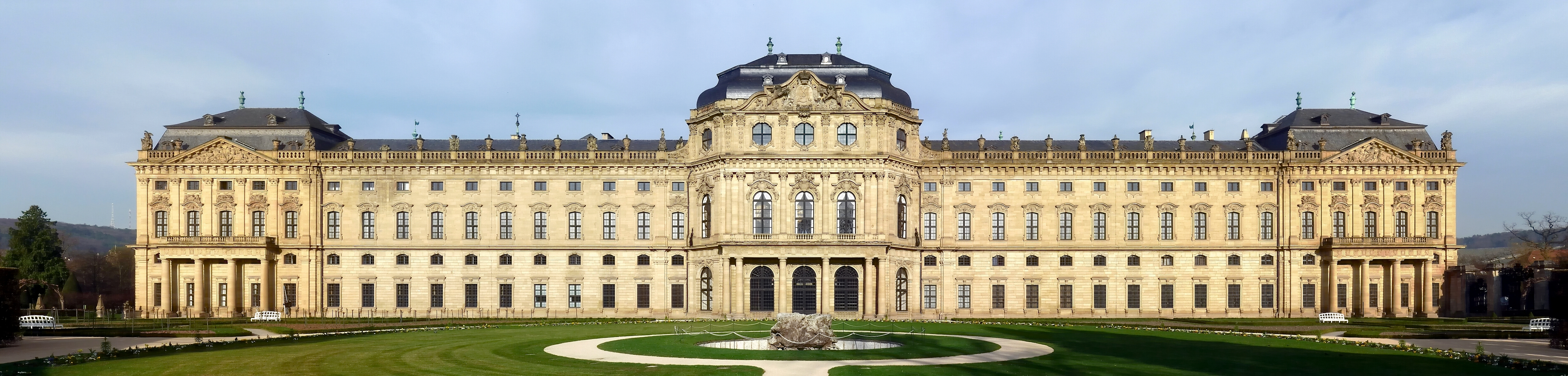
Würzburg Residence

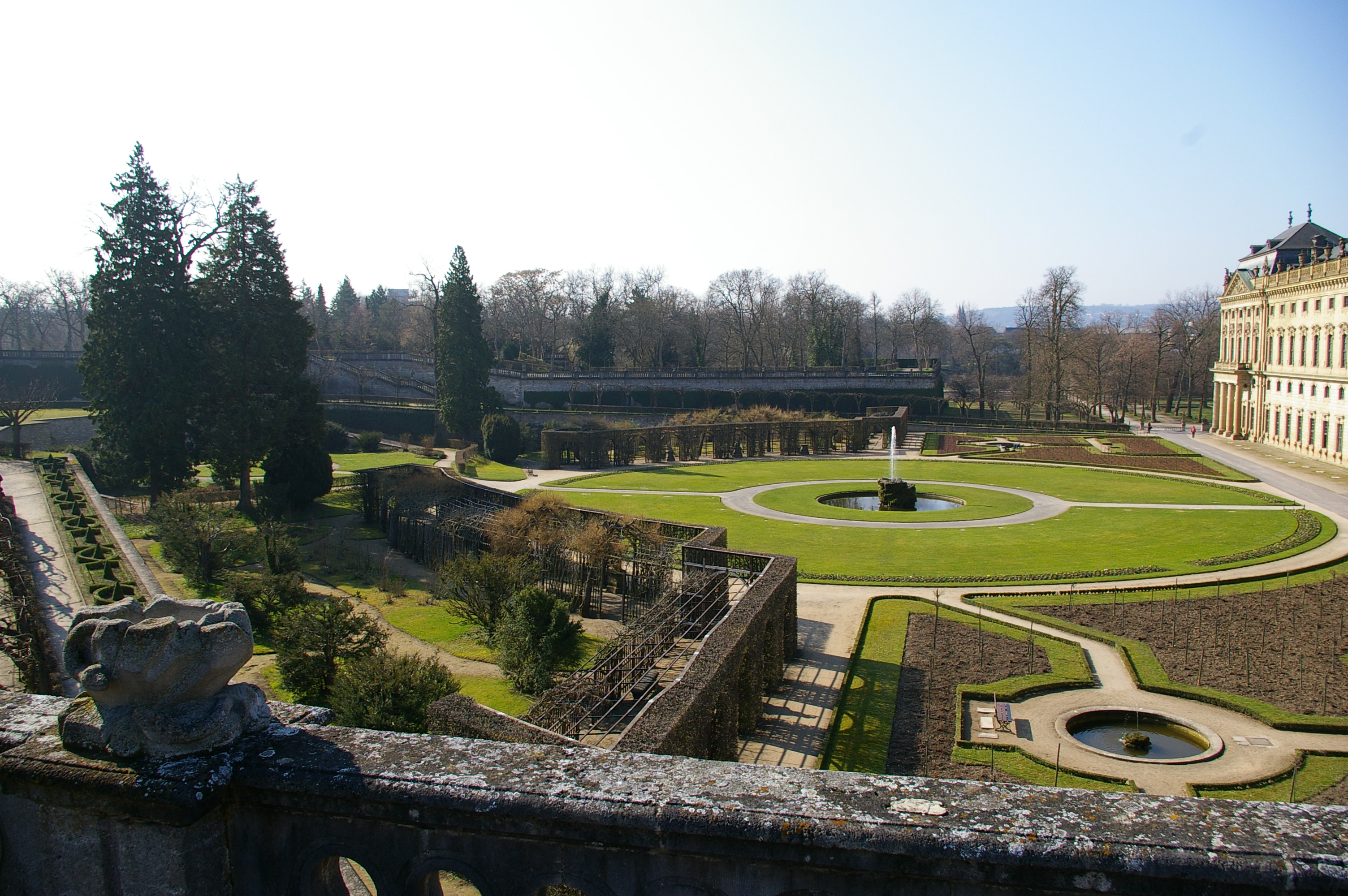
Court gardens

The Mozart Festival Würzburg is an annual four-week festival of classic music in the city of Würzburg. It is the oldest festival dedicated to Mozart's music in Germany. The Festival is held in the building and the gardens of UNESCO World Heritage Würzburg Residence .

== Event ==
The Mozart Festival Würzburg is Germany's oldest Mozart Festival. Like the Salzburg Festival it ranks among the most well-known festivals of classic music in the German-speaking world. Each year between May and June internationally renowned symphony orchestras perform Mozart's masterpieces in more than 60 concerts. It is a mixture of indoor and open-air concerts in the unique atmosphere of Würzburg Residence and its court gardens.

Today between 25,000 and 30,000 people from all over the world visit Würzburg to join this musical event.

== History ==
The Mozart Festival Würzburg was founded in 1922. The idea of organising a Mozart Festival in Würzburg came up one year earlier after an evening of music at the Grand Emperor’s hall in the Würzburg Residence. The conductor, Hermann Zilcher, overwhelmed by the ornate stucco and lavish surroundings said "I only needed to trace a certain piece of ornamentation with my baton in the air, and that was enough for a union between sound, architecture and colour". One year later the Würzburg Mozart Festival was installed.

The last regular Mozart Festival was held in 1942. During the Nazi era, especially in the years 1943-1944, the festival was strongly influenced by the propaganda organisation Kraft durch Freude. Parts of the Residence were destroyed by the bombings of Würzburg in 1945, thus the annual festival ceased for the time being. In the following years the Residence was rebuilt and in 1951, encouraged by Bayerischer Rundfunk, the festival could be continued.

In 2011 the Mozart Festival Würzburg celebrated its 90th birthday.

== Partial list of past featured artists ==
- Heinz Holliger
- Alfred Brendel
- Philippe Herreweghe
- Christopher Hogwood
- Gidon Kremer
- Lorin Maazel
- Sir Neville Marriner
- Waltraud Meier
- Yehudi Menuhin
- Trevor Pinnock
- Jukka-Pekka Saraste
- Olga Scheps
- René Jacobs
- Diana Damrau
- Christian Gerhaher
- Mitsuko Uchida
- Roger Norrington
- Rafael Kubelik
