= Peter Rösel =

German pianist

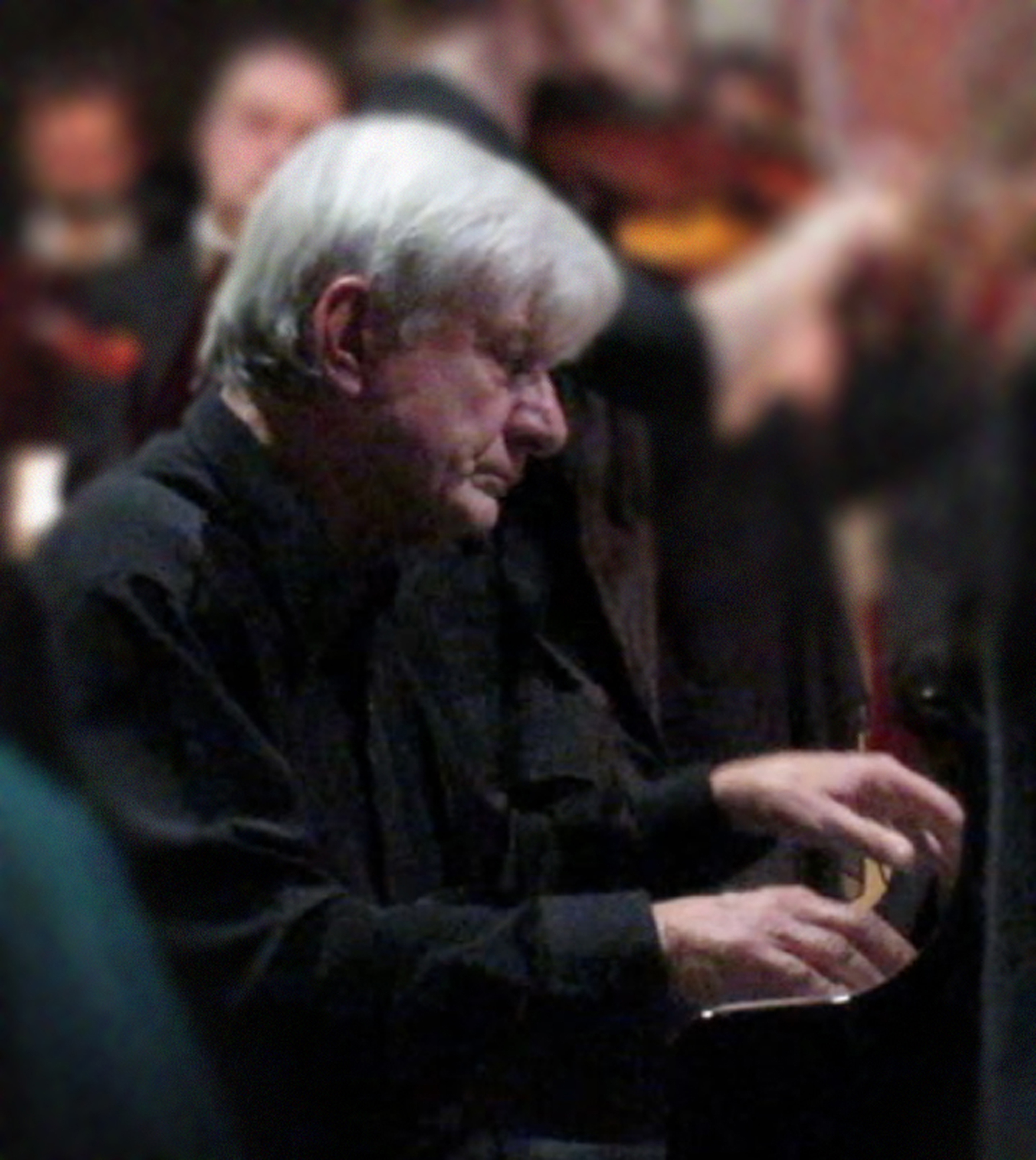
Rösel in 2015

Peter Rösel (born 2 February 1945, in Dresden) is a German concert pianist.

== Appearances ==
Rösel has appeared for years at international festivals (Salzburg, Edinburgh, London Proms, Perth, Hollywood Bowl, Hong Kong) and with many major orchestras, such as Los Angeles Philharmonic and Royal Philharmonic Orchestra, Detroit Symphony Orchestra and Berlin Philharmonic.

He has performed with renowned conductors, Rudolf Kempe, Horst Stein, Yuri Temirkanov, Tennstedt and Vonk. With Kurt Masur and the Gewandhaus Orchestra of Leipzig he has performed on international stages over two hundred times.

Symphonic highlights of Rösel's career have included concerts with the London Philharmonic Orchestra, the Gulbenkian Orchestra of Lisbon, the Netherlands Philharmonic Orchestra, the KBS Symphony Orchestra Seoul, the Mozarteum Orchestra Salzburg, the New Japan Philharmonic, the Gewandhaus Orchestra, the German Symphony Orchestra, the Staatskapelle Dresden, the New York Philharmonic, the Montreal Symphony Orchestra, the Toronto Symphony Orchestra, the Baltimore Symphony Orchestra, the Florida Orchestra, the Philharmonia Orchestra, the Dresdner Philharmonie, the MDR-Sinfonieorchester, the Bern Symphony Orchestra, the National Symphony Orchestra of Taiwan, the Kioi Sinfonietta Tokyo, the NHK Symphony Orchestra and the Konzerthausorchester Berlin. He has performed under conductors including Kurt Sanderling, Günther Herbig, Hartmut Haenchen, Dmitri Kitayenko, Hubert Soudant, Herbert Blomstedt, Nayden Todorov, Andrey Boreyko, Daniel Harding, Charles Dutoit, Vladimir Fedoseyev, Gabriel Feltz, Claus Peter Flor, Bernard Haitink, Marek Janowski, Kirill Kondrashin, Stefan Sanderling, Walter Weller, Iván Fischer, Roberto Treviño, Herbert Kegel and Heinz Bongartz.

In 2005 he played all five Beethoven concertos in the Semper Opera House with Kioi Sinfonietta Tokyo.

Numerous recordings available on CD by Peter Rösel, including an outstanding recording of the complete piano works of Johannes Brahms.
