= Gábor Boldoczki =

Hungarian trumpeter

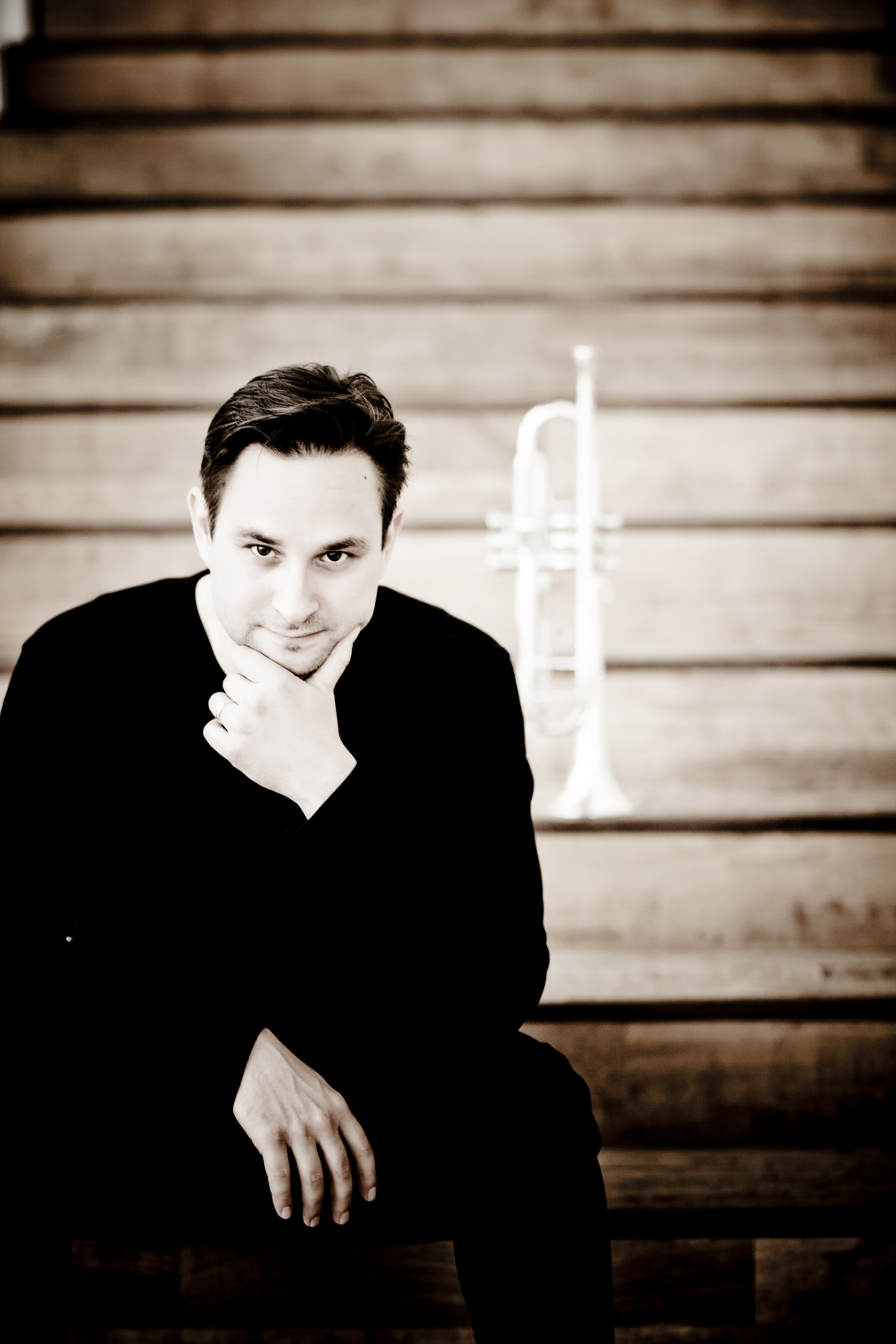
Gábor Boldoczki, 2010

Gábor Boldoczki (born 1976 in Szeged, Hungary) is a Hungarian trumpeter who plays Classical music.

Boldoczki first played the trumpet in 2004 in the Salzburg Festival. He has been a professor of trumpet at the Franz Liszt Academy of Music since 2010.
