= Felix Mendelssohn Bartholdy Prize =

German music award

The Mendelssohn Scholarship, awarded by the Prussian State from 1879 to 1936, was revived in 1963 by the Prussian Cultural Heritage Foundation. The Foundation awards the Felix Mendelssohn-Bartholdy Prize once a year per competition opened to particularly talented students at one of the 23 recognised music academies in Germany.

The award is decided in a competition with two annually changing competition subjects, in which each university may nominate only one candidate or ensemble for each subject. Ensembles consisting of students from different universities may also be nominated (the universities participating in the mixed ensembles agree on which university will nominate this ensemble).

The Rektorenkonferenz der deutschen Musikhochschulen appoints the members of the juries. For each competition subject, they are composed of a rector as chairman, four specialist jurors and two jurors from other disciplines.

== State of Prussia ==
- 1893: Carl Thiel
- 1901: Alfred Wittenberg

== Prussian Cultural Heritage Foundation ==
- 1963: Klaviertrio (Cologne): Bernhard Kontarsky, Jörg-Wolfgang Jahn, Thomas Bless
- 1965: Yuuko Shiokawa
- 1966: Walter Steffens
- 1970: Raymund Havenith
- 1974: Georg Faust
- 1977: Marioara Trifan
- 1978: Harald Feller
- 1988: Herbert Fandel
- 1997: Luiza Borac and Kersten McCall
- 1998: Erika Geldsetzer, Marion Reinhard and Toomas Vana
- 1999: Markus Schön and Anke Vondung
- 2000: Franz Kaern and Birgit Kölbl
- 2001: esBRASSo-Quintett and Johannes Moser
- 2002: Cambini-Quintett and Julia Mai
- 2003: Andrew Dewar and the Korea String Trio
- 2004: Jan Skryhan and Konstantin Wolff
- 2005: Kim Trio and Guilhaume Santana
- 2006: Julian Arp, Frederic Belli and Caspar Frantz
- 2007: Emilio Peroni, Pauline Reguig and Li-Chun Su
- 2008: Orion Quartet and Wen Xiao Zheng
- 2009: Ankush Kumar Bahl
- 2010: Duo Parthenon aus Christine Rauh (cello) and Johannes Nies (piano) from the Hochschule für Musik, Theater und Medien Hannover
- 2012: Sarah Christian and Sebastian Küchler-Blessing
- 2013: Konstanze von Gutzeit
- 2014: Dennis Sörös
- 2015: Sara Kim
- 2016: Wataru Hisasue

== Other prize winners (Scholarship of the Federal President) ==
- 2003: Mareile Krumbholz and Matthias Voget
- 2004: Falko Hönisch, Nicolas Kyriakou and Christian Peix
- 2005: Manfred Baumgärtner, Alpézso Trio and Julius Stern Trio
- 2006: Tobias Bloos, Maria Daroch, Tomasz Daroch, Nicolas Naudot and Li-Chun Su
- 2007: Jovana Nikolic, Marie-Claudine Papadopoulos and Alexander Schimpf
- 2008: Eos Klavierquartet, Barbara Buntrock and Julia Neher
- Wettbewerb 2009:
  - Klavierduo von der Hochschule für Musik und Theater München: Richard Humburger, Valentin Humburger
  - Quartett von der Universität der Künste Berlin: Armida-Quartett (Martin Funda, Johanna Eschenburg, Teresa Schwamm, Peter-Philipp Staemmler)
- 2010: Duo Roudi Li (cello) and Vasyl Kotys (piano), Hochschule für Musik und Theater Rostock
- 2012: Iva Miletic and Nathan Laube
- 2014: Sumi Hwang (singer), University of Music and Performing Arts Munich
- 2015: Adrien La Marca, Hochschule für Musik "Hanns Eisler"
- 2016: So Hyang In, University of Music and Performing Arts Munich

== See also ==
- Leipzig International Mendelssohn Prize, former Leipziger Mendelssohn-Preis, der Mendelssohn Foundation
