= James Simon (composer) =

German composer, pianist and musicologist (1880–1944)

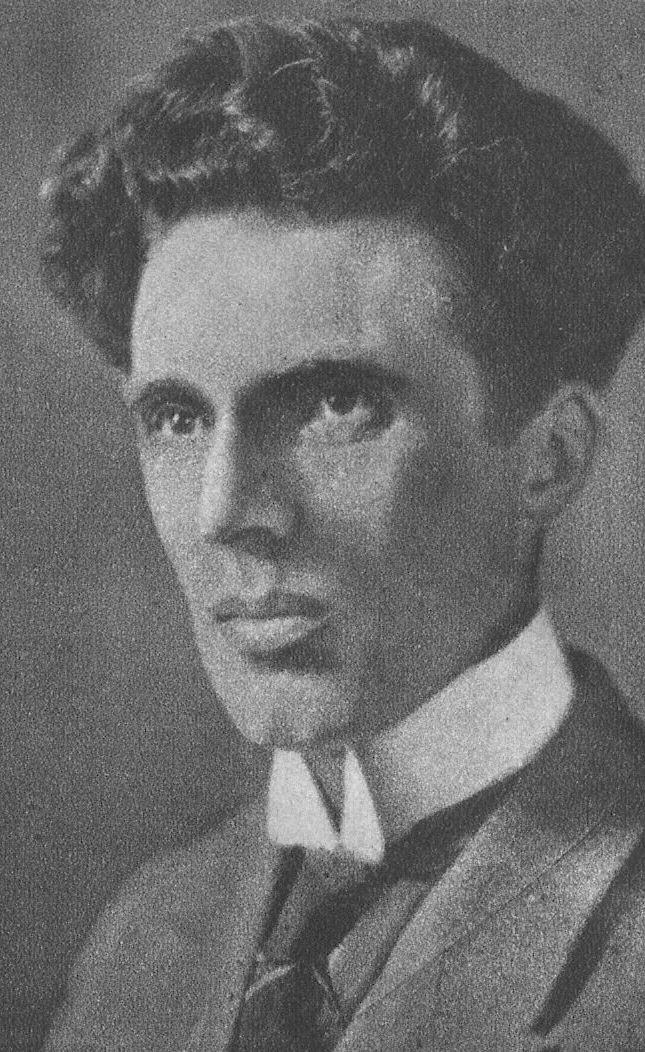
Portrait photo of the musician James Simon

James Simon (29 September 1880 – 12/14 October 1944) was a German composer, pianist and musicologist.

== Timeline ==
- Born on 29 September 1880 in Berlin
- Married on 1 May 1907 to Anna Levy in Berlin
- Birth of his son, Jörn Martin Simon on 14 September 1910 in Berlin
- Birth of his son, Ulrich Ernst Simon on 21 September 1913 in Berlin
- Emigration: 1 April 1933, via Zürich to Amsterdam, the Netherlands
- Death of his son, Jörn in 1937 in Russia during the purge of the Moscow Trials
- Deported from Westerbork 5 April 1944 to Theresienstadt, ghetto
- Transferred 12 October 1944, to Auschwitz, extermination camp
- Death: 14 October 1944, Auschwitz, extermination camp – officially declared dead, age 64

== Biography ==
James Simon was born into a Jewish family in Berlin and murdered in Auschwitz in 1944 following his internment at Theresienstadt. He studied at the Musikhochschule in Berlin piano (Conrad Ansorge) and composition (Max Bruch). In 1934 he was forced to leave Germany to Zurich, later Amsterdam where he was arrested and deported to Theresienstadt. From there, on 12 October 1944, James Simon boarded the transport to Auschwitz and was murdered in a gas chamber shortly after his arrival. He was last seen sitting on his suitcase composing music.

His older son, Jörn Martin Simon, died in the purge of the Moscow Trials in 1937. The younger son, Ulrich Ernst Simon, survived, escaping to London, where as a young man he converted to Christianity, became a noted Anglican writer and theologian, and was a member of the council of King's College London.

== Published works ==
While some of Simon's piano pieces, songs and his opera Frau im Stein (1918) (based on Rolf Lauckner’s work) were published, many of his compositions remain unperformed. He is called the "Lost Composer".

His Lamento für Cello und piano (in jemenitischer Weise), Meinem Lieben Martin! (17/18 December 1938) was premiered in Prague by Czech cellist František Brikcius as part of the "Weinberger Tour" on 23 April 2007 at the Spanish Synagogue.

A cantata, Ein Pilgermorgen (A Pilgrim’s Morning, 1929–30) for soprano, tenor, baritone, chorus and orchestra to a text by Rilke, survives in manuscript.

== See also ==
- Karel Berman
- Pavel Haas
- Gideon Klein
- Paul Kling
- Hans Krása
- Egon Ledeč
- Rafael Schächter
- Zikmund Schul
- Viktor Ullmann
