= Caspar Frantz =

German classical pianist

Caspar Frantz (born 1980) is a German pianist and music educator.

== Life ==
Born in Kiel, Frantz received piano lessons from the age of seven. He completed his studies in the classes of Matthias Kirschnereit at the Hochschule für Musik und Theater Rostock and in chamber music with Eberhard Feltz at the Hochschule für Musik "Hanns Eisler". He received further important artistic impulses from Renate Kretschmar-Fischer and Elisabeth Leonskaja and attended master classes with Karl-Heinz Kämmerling, Maria João Pires and György Kurtág.

In September he played together with the MDR Symphony Orchestra, the Philharmonic Orchestra of Kiel, the New Philharmonic Orchestra of Westphalia, the State Philharmonic Orchestra of Moldova Iaşi, the Polish Chamber Philharmonic Orchestra and the North German Philharmonic Orchestra Rostock. He is a frequent guest of renowned music festivals, for example the Schleswig-Holstein-Musik-Festival, the Rheingau Musik Festival, the Schwetzingen Festival and the Beethovenfest Bonn. His chamber music partners include among others Chloë Hanslip, Antje Weithaas, Sabine Meyer, Bryn Terfel and the Vogler Quartet. From 2005 to 2010, Frantz dedicated himself to the cyclical performance of Ludwig van Beethoven's complete piano sonatas at Schloss Melschede (Sundern).

In 2004, Frantz received the Carl Heinz Illies scholarship from the Deutsche Stiftung Musikleben. He is, in duo with the cellist Julian Arp, prizewinner of the German Music Competition, the Mendelssohn Competition and the Premio Vittorio Gui, Florence. The Arp-Frantz Duo has recorded three CDs for the Genuin label, including the complete works for violoncello and piano by Felix Mendelssohn Bartholdy. Frantz's latest solo recording with works by Robert Schumann was released on the Ars Produktion label. Frantz was a scholarship holder of the Villa Musica and the Rostock Horst Rahe Foundation.

He was also curator of the Berlin literary journal Belletristik (Zeitschrift)|Belletristik. Since March 2015, Frantz has been professor of chamber music at the University of Music and Theatre Leipzig.

Frantz is the nephew of the pianist and conductor Justus Frantz.

== Prizes ==
- Multiple first prize winner of the national competition Jugend musiziert.
- Prize winner of the Grotrian-Steinweg Klavierspielwettbewerb, Braunschweig.
- 2003 together with the cellist Julian Arp, first prize winner of the 1st Relais & Château chamber music promotion competition.
- 2006 together with Julian Arp 1st prize winner of the Mendelssohn Competition
- 2006 together with Julian Arp, prize winner of deutscher Musikwettbewerb.
- 2006 together with Julian Arp 1st prize winner of the Premio Vittorio Gui (Florence)
