= Christine Rauh =

German cellist

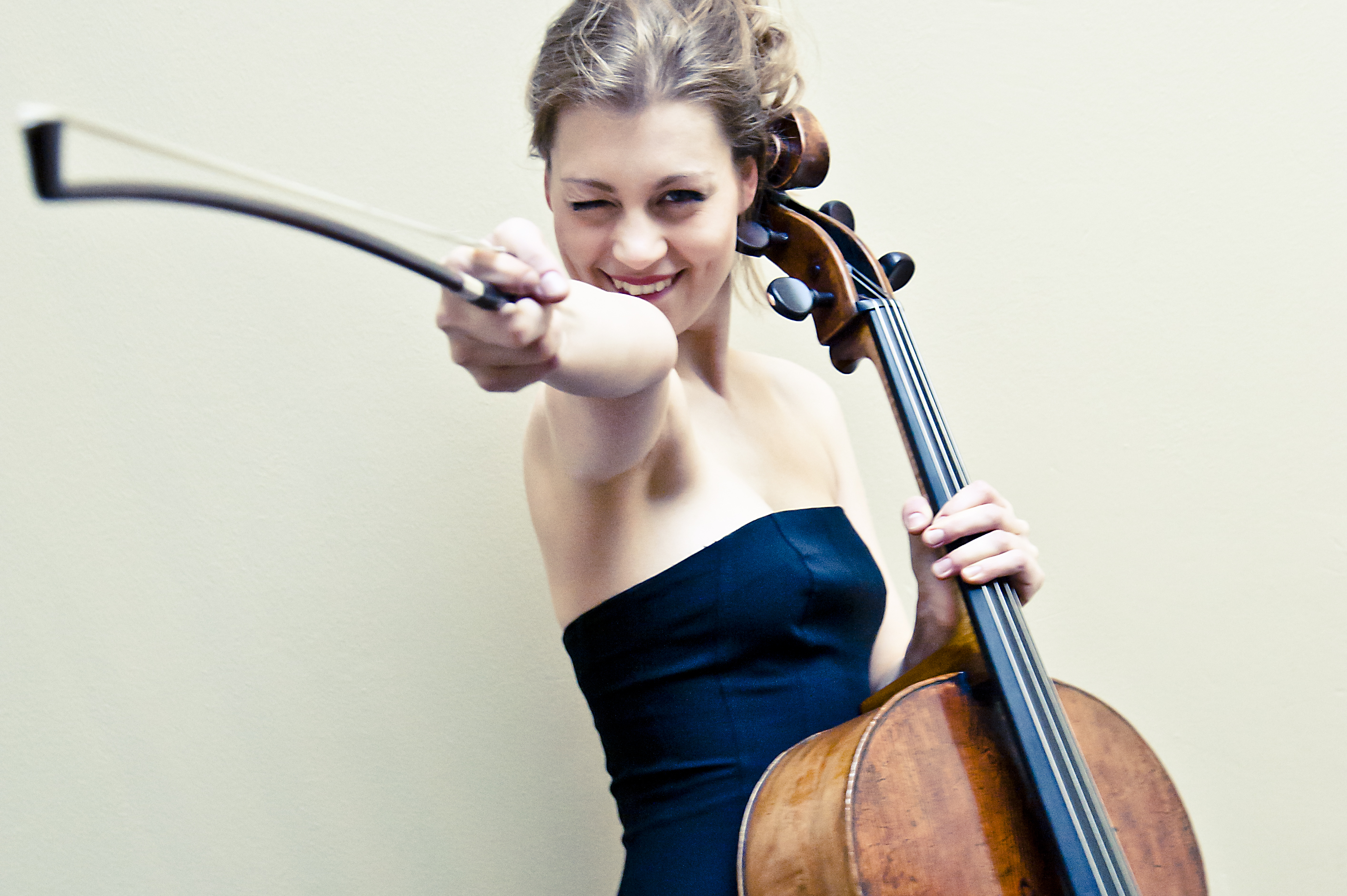
Christine Rauh

Christine Rauh (born 18 March 1984) is a German cellist.

== Life ==
Born in Osnabrück, Rauh spent her childhood in Oxford, where she took violoncello lessons with Jonathan Beecher from 1989 to 1999. At the age of 16 she was accepted as a young student in Gerhard Mantel's cello class at the Frankfurt University of Music and Performing Arts. In 2003, she continued her education there as part of her main cello studies, which she completed in 2005 with an honours diploma. She completed her concert exams at the Berlin University of the Arts with Jens Peter Maintz with distinction; in 2009 she completed her studies with Markus Becker at the Hochschule für Musik, Theater und Medien Hannover with a predicate concert exam in the subject of violoncello in chamber music.

She received musical inspiration from Mstislav Rostropovich and Philippe Muller in Paris. She also took part in international master classes with Wolfgang Boettcher, Alfred Brendel, Young-Chang Cho, David Geringas, Leonid Gorokhov, Frans Helmerson, Gary Hoffman, Gerhard Mantel, Arto Noras and Heinrich Schiff.

In her solo concerts, Rauh appears as a soloist with works by Antonín Dvořák, Johannes Brahms, Carl Maria von Weber and Heitor Villa-Lobos Another focus of their repertoire is the French composers of Impressionism such as Camille Saint-Saëns and Maurice Ravel. Rauh also played the German premieres of several compositions by contemporary composers. In 2001 she performed the cello character piece Ay, there's the rub at the Staatstheater Darmstadt at the invitation of the composer Marco Stroppa. In November 2008, she also played at the scholarship holders' concert of the Paul-Hindemith-Gesellschaft in Berlin in the concert hall of the Universität der Künste Berlin.

Since her solo debut in 1998, Rauh has performed as a soloist with orchestras, as a recitalist with the Duo Parthenon and as a chamber musician. Concert tours have taken her to Austria, Liechtenstein, Switzerland, Great Britain, France, Italy, Bulgaria, Russia and Japan.

Further projects of Rauh were duo performances with Johannes Nies within the framework of the Villa Musica foundation, including works by Rodion Shchedrin, Manuel de Falla and Astor Piazzolla. In February 2010, she performed with the programme "Masterpieces of European Cello Literature" at the Landesmusikakademie Hessen.

In 2016, she released her classical-jazz album Kapustin - Works for Cello.

== Instrument ==
Christine Rauh plays the Giovanni Battista Rogeri violoncello from 1671, on loan from the Deutsche Stiftung Musikleben, the "Tigre" violoncello by Amati Mangenot from 1929 and a bow by Christian Wilhelm Knopf from the early 19th century.

== Prizes ==
Rauh won the 2009 International Isang-Yun Competition. In 2011, she was selected by the Federal Government as one of the "100 women of tomorrow". She was also awarded the Prize of the Friedrich Jürgen Sellheim Society, a scholarship of the Deutscher Musikrat (with Johannes Nies piano) in the duo ranking a Gerd Bucerius Scholarship of the German Foundation Musikleben (2008), a scholarship of the Marguerite von Grunelius Foundation (2008) and a scholarship of the Friends of Villa Musica (2008) was awarded. She also received a scholarship and Diploma di Merito from the Accademia Musicale Chigiana in Siena and was Artist in Residence at the Euro Nippon Music Festival 2007 in Japan. In 2010, Rauh received the Felix Mendelssohn Bartholdy Prize together with Johannes Nies (Duo Parthenon).

== Recording ==
- 2016 – Nikolai Kapustin: Works for Cello, with Benyamin Nuss (piano)
