= Mareile =

Mareile is a German forename and may refer to

- Mareile Höppner (born 1977), a German television presenter and journalist
- Mareile Krumbholz (born 1982), a German organist and music teacher
- Mareile Flitsch, a German sinologist, professor at the University of Zurich
