= Konrad Meister =

German pianist and music educator

- Born: 30 July 1930
- Died: 27 June 2002
- Occupation: German pianist

Konrad Meister (30 July 1930 – 27 June 2002) was a German pianist and music educator.

== Life ==
Born in Heidelberg, Meister was the son of the writer and publisher Hermann Meister (1890-1956) and the pianist Adelheid Meister (1897–1996). He graduated from the Humanistisches Gymnasium in Heidelberg with the Abitur in 1949 and passed the bookseller's assistant exam in 1951. In 1956, he temporarily took over his father's publishing and printing business. At the same time, from 1945 he was a young student for piano at the former conservatory in Heidelberg, which was later merged with the Hochschule für Musik und Darstellende Kunst Mannheim. He then studied from 1953 to 1956 at the Hochschule für Musik Detmold. In 1956, he passed the künstlerische Reifeprüfung with Conrad Hansen. Meister gave concerts in numerous European countries. In 1973, he had already given 500 concerts.

In addition to his concert activities, from 1975 Meister became a teacher of piano and piano methodology and deputy director of the Heidelberg University of Music. Further teaching activities led him to the Nürnberg Conservatory and the Bremen Conservatory. From 1975 to 1995, he worked full-time as a pianist, teacher and methodology researcher in Hanover, and in 1977, he was appointed professor at the Hochschule für Musik, Theater und Medien Hannover. Meister was one of the first researchers to study externally recognisable movement sequences of famous pianists on the basis of video recordings.

== Private life ==
Meister had been married to the composer and pianist Siegrid Ernst since 1957 and in second marriage since 1979, with the piano teacher Anne Hammann-Meister. He had four children: from first marriage Beate Cornelia Meister († 1984) and Rudolf Meister; from second marriage Cornelius Meister and Gabriele Meister (journalist).

Meister died in Hanover at the age of 71.
