= Conrad Hansen =

German classical pianist (1906–2002)

External audio
- Shellac recordings with Conrad Hansen in the Online Archive of the Österreichische Mediathek

Conrad Hansen (24 November 1906 – 22 June 2002) was a German pianist and piano teacher.

== Life ==
Born in Lippstadt, as an eight-year-old, Hansen had his first piano lessons in his hometown, and only two years later he was giving public concerts. Above all, he made a name for himself worldwide as an interpreter of the works of Ludwig van Beethoven. In 1922, Hansen went to Berlin as a pupil of Edwin Fischer, with whom he studied together with Grete Sultan and Ferry Gebhardt, and five years later he made his debut with the Berliner Philharmoniker under their principal conductor Wilhelm Furtwängler. Further concerts followed under Eugen Jochum, Willem Mengelberg, Herbert von Karajan and even Richard Strauss. The recording of Beethoven's Piano Concerto No. 4 from 1943 with the Berlin Philharmonic Orchestra conducted by Furtwängler is still considered an insider tip by connoisseurs.

Hansen pupils included Reimar Dahlgrün, Konrad Meister, Renate Kretschmar-Fischer, Helena Rocha von Oertzen and Vera Schwarz.

From 1934 to 1945, he was a lecturer at the Stern Conservatory and in 1946, co-founder of the Hochschule für Musik Detmold, where he was a professor until 1960.

He founded the Hansen Trio with Erich Röhn (violin) and Arthur Troester (violoncello).

In 1960, Hansen succeeded Eduard Erdmann at the Hochschule für Musik und Theater Hamburg. Students from Germany, Scandinavia, Russia, Japan or the USA came to Hamburg and sought his advice. Later, Hansen also taught at the Lübeck Academy of Music, where he continued to give courses until his old age.

Hansen received the Johannes Brahms Medal of the Hanseatic City of Hamburg, which was also awarded to Günter Wand, Yehudi Menuhin, Felicitas Kukuck and the Hamburg Symphony Orchestra, among others, and was an honorary ring bearer of the city of Lippstadt. On 24 May 2004, the council of the city of Lippstadt decided to name the music school of the city of Lippstadt after himn. The official renaming took place on 24 November 2004 during a ceremony.

During the war years, Hansen made a series of recordings for Telefunken and for the Reichs-Rundfunk-Gesellschaft (RRG). In the 1950s, Hansen made a number of records, initially again for Telefunken (chamber music by Franz Schubert and Antonín Dvořák), then for the Deutsche Grammophon (sonatas by Wolfgang Amadeus Mozart, played on a fortepiano) and finally for Ariola-Eurodisc (Piano Concerto No. 1 & No. 3 by Ludwig van Beethoven). Recordings of Beethoven's piano works as well as contemporary works can also be found in the sound archives of German radio stations.

In the Henle edition of the piano sonatas by Beethoven, Hansen proposed the fingering.

His first marriage was to the pianist and harpsichordist Eliza Hansen.

Hansen died in Hamburg at the age of 95.
