= Sebastian Küchler-Blessing =

German organist (born 1987)

Sebastian Küchler-Blessing (born in 1987) is a German organist and music educator.

== Life ==
As a young student Küchler-Blessing studied piano and organ at the Staatliche Hochschule für Musik Trossingen with Christoph Bossert and at the Hochschule für Musik Karlsruhe with Sontraud Speidel.

At the Hochschule für Musik Freiburg, he studied church music, music theory and concert organ (Soloist diploma with distinction) with Martin Schmeding and Otfried Büsing. Other formative teachers were Manfred Schreier, Hans Michael Beuerle and Zsigmond Szathmáry.

Since 2014, Küchler-Blessing has been active as cathedral organist at Essen Minster, the cathedral of the Roman Catholic Diocese of Essen.

He has played as a soloist under the direction of conductors such as Gustavo Dudamel, Hartmut Haenchen and Winfried Toll. His work also takes him to ensembles such as the Orchestra Mozart led by Claudio Abbado, the Stuttgart Chamber Orchestra conducted by Wolfram Christ, the Windsbacher Knabenchor directed by Karl-Friedrich Beringer and Martin Lehmann and musicians like Reinhold Friedrich, Gábor Boldoczki, Sibylla Rubens and Severin von Eckardstein together.

He holds a teaching position at the Robert Schumann Hochschule Düsseldorf for organ and liturgical organ play / improvisation and taught in the 2015/16 winter semester in the substitute teaching position for Martin Schmeding at the Freiburg University of Music.

In 2016, he was a juror at the international organ competition Daniel Herz Brixen.

== Prizes ==
- 2003: Jugend Musiziert National Competition: 1. Prize (Maximum score) – Organ solo
- 2004: International Competition for Young Organists Ljubljana: 1. Prize
- 2005: Jugend Musiziert National Competition: 1. Prize (Maximum score) – Klavier solo
- 2008: International Organ Competition Herford: only prize to be awarded in improvisation
- 2009: Internationaler Wettbewerb für Orgelimprovisation Schwäbisch Gmünd (3. Prize and Public Award)
- 2010: Festspiele Mecklenburg-Vorpommern: Public Award
- 2011: International Organ Competition of the Internationale Orgelwoche Nürnberg: 1. Prize
- 2012: International Johann Sebastian Bach Competition Leipzig
- 2012: Felix Mendelssohn Bartholdy Prize
- 2014: Arthur Waser Prize of the Lucerne Symphony Orchestra

== Recordings ==
- Klais-Orgel Ruhe Christi-Kirche Rottweil: Orgelwerke von Bach, Mozart und Johann Ulrich Steigleder (Production: organum Musikproduktion 2016).
- Cantatas BWV 1 Wie schön leuchtet der Morgenstern, BWV 1, 48, 78 and Wachet auf, ruft uns die Stimme, BWV 140 by J. S. Bach: Windsbacher Knabenchor, Deutsche Kammer-Virtuosen Berlin, Karl-Friedrich Beringer (Production: Sony classical 2012).
- Carl Philipp Emanuel Bach: Hamburger Sinfonien Wq 182: Stuttgarter Kammerorchester, Wolfram Christ (Production: Hänssler Classic 2013).
