= Conrad Ansorge =

German musician

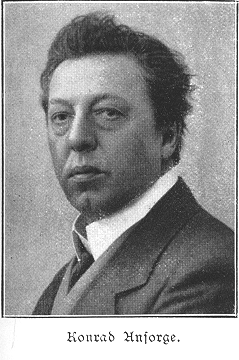
- Portrait of Ansorge from the book Spemanns goldenes Buch der Musik, published 1904
- Born: Conrad Eduard Reinhold Ansorge; October 15, 1862; Buchwald, Province of Silesia, Kingdom of Prussia
- Died: February 13, 1930 (aged 67); Liebau, Province of Lower Silesia, Weimar Republic
- Era: Fin de siècle
- Spouse: Margarete Wegelin
- Children: Joachim

Notes
- See: List of music students by teacher: A to B#Conrad Ansorge .

Conrad Eduard Reinhold Ansorge (15 October 1862 – 13 February 1930) was a German pianist, teacher and composer.

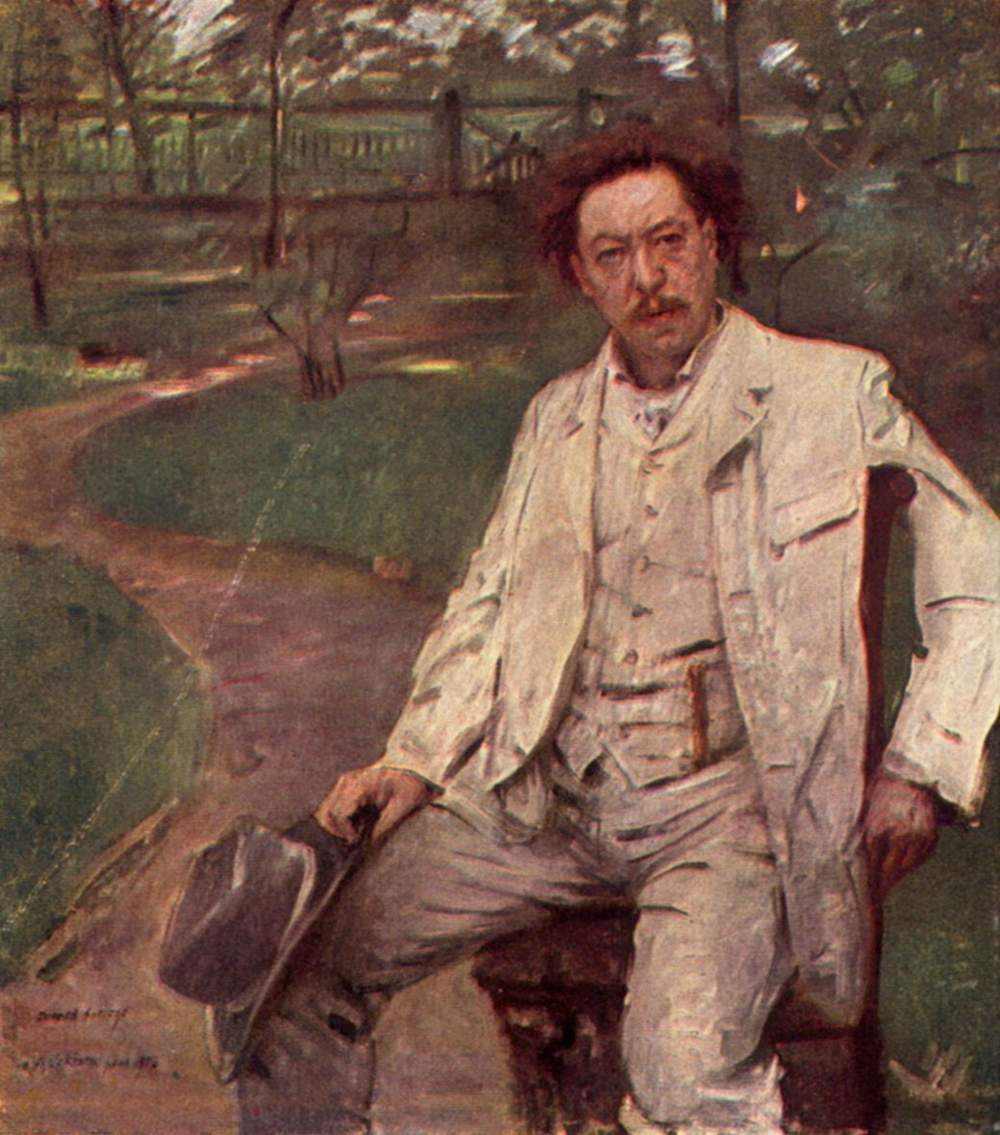
Portrait of Ansorge by Lovis Corinth, 1903

Ansorge was born in Buchwald, Silesia, studied at the Leipzig Conservatory between 1880 and 1882, and under Franz Liszt in Weimar in 1885 and 1886. He toured Europe and the United States. He was known for his interpretations of Beethoven.

On 15 April 1890, his "Orpheus" symphony was performed in Steinway Hall, New York, under the baton of Theodore Thomas. He became professor of pianoforte at Weimar in 1893. From 1898 to 1903 he taught at Berlin, in the Klindworth-Scharwenka Conservatory.

In 1920 he became head of the piano master class at the German Academy (Deutschen Akademie für Musik und Darstellende Kunst) in Prague.

Conrad Ansorge's students included: Selim Palmgren, Eduard Erdmann, James Simon, Alice Herz-Sommer, and Wilhelm Furtwängler.

He made some Welte-Mignon recordings in 1905, of music by Liszt, Schumann and others. He also wrote a Requiem, two symphonies, a piano concerto, three piano sonatas, two string quartets, and other works. None of these are in the current repertoire.

He married the pianist Margarete Wegelin. Their son Joachim (1893–1947) was also a pianist and teacher. He died in Berlin.

== List of works ==
- Piano Sonata No. 1, Op. 1
- Traumbilder, Op. 8
- Acht Lieder, Op. 10
- Sieben Gesänge, Op. 11
- Vigilien, Op. 12
- String Quartet, Op. 13
- Fünf Gesänge, Op. 14, ein Cyclus in 4 Gesängen
- Fünf Lieder, Op. 15
- Weidenwald. Umdichtung von Stefan George nach Dante Gabriel Rossetti, Op. 16
- Fünf Lieder, Op. 17
- Erntelieder, after a poem by Franz Evers, Op. 18
- Urworte und andere Gedichte von Goethe, Op. 19
- Piano Sonata No. 2, Op. 21
- Lieder und Gesänge für eine Singstimmen mit Begleitung des Pianoforte, Op. 22
- Piano Sonata No. 3 in A major, Op. 23
- Cello Sonata, Op. 24
- Polish Dances (arr.for piano)
- Arrangement for piano of Bach's Toccata, Adagio and Fugue
- Piano Concerto, Op. 28

== Sources ==
- Eric Blom, ed., Grove's Dictionary of Music and Musicians, 5th ed.
- Bach cantatas
