= Zikmund Schul =

German composer

Zikmund Schul (11 January 1916 – 2 June 1944) was a German Jewish composer.

== Life ==
Schul was born in Chemnitz, Germany, into an Eastern European Jewish family, and grew up in Kassel. Only little is known about his life. He moved to Prague in 1933. In 1937 he started to study composition in Prague, where he was a pupil of Alois Hába. During his time in Prague he became a friend of Viktor Ullmann. In Prague he started also to archive a collection of synagogal-songs from the synagogue of Prague (under the direction of Salomon Lieben). Schul married Olga Stern in 1941, and both were deported to Terezin on 30 November 1941. Schul died in Theresienstadt concentration camp from tuberculosis.

== Worklist ==
Opus	Date	English title	Remarks
op 9b Nr.1	1937	Die Nischt – Gewesenen	Song for Alto and Piano
-	1941	Mogen Ovos	Organ and Choir
-	1941	Fuge in E	Piano
-	1941-42	2 Chassidic Dances	Viola and Cello
-	1942	Zaddik	String Quartet
-	1942	Cantata Judaïca Op. 13 (finale)	Tenor and Choir
-	1942	Ki Tavo al Ha'aretz	Children's Choir
-	1942	Uv’tzeil K’nofecho	String Quartet
-	1942	V'l'Yerushalayim	Voice and String Quartet arrangiert nach Vilem Zrzavy
-	1943	Schiksal	Song for Alt, Flute, Viola and Violoncello from "Dunkle Klänge"
-	1943	Duo	Violin and Viola
-	-	Phrase from a piano sonata	

== Literature ==
- Initiative Hans Krása in Hamburg, Germany: Komponisten in Theresienstadt ISBN 3-00-005164-3

== Recordings ==
- Chassidische Tänze Op. 15 – Ensemble Alraune; Cd Novantiqua
- Chassidische Tänze Op. 15 – Julia Rebekka Adler, viola Thomas Ruge, cello; Cd NEOS Music
- Die Nischt-Gewesenen – Wolfgang Holzmair, baritone, Russell Ryan, piano; Bridge Records

The whole music written in Concentration Camps are contained in the CD-Encyclopedia KZ MUSIK created by Francesco Lotoro
