= Matthias Kirschnereit =

German classical pianist (born 1962)

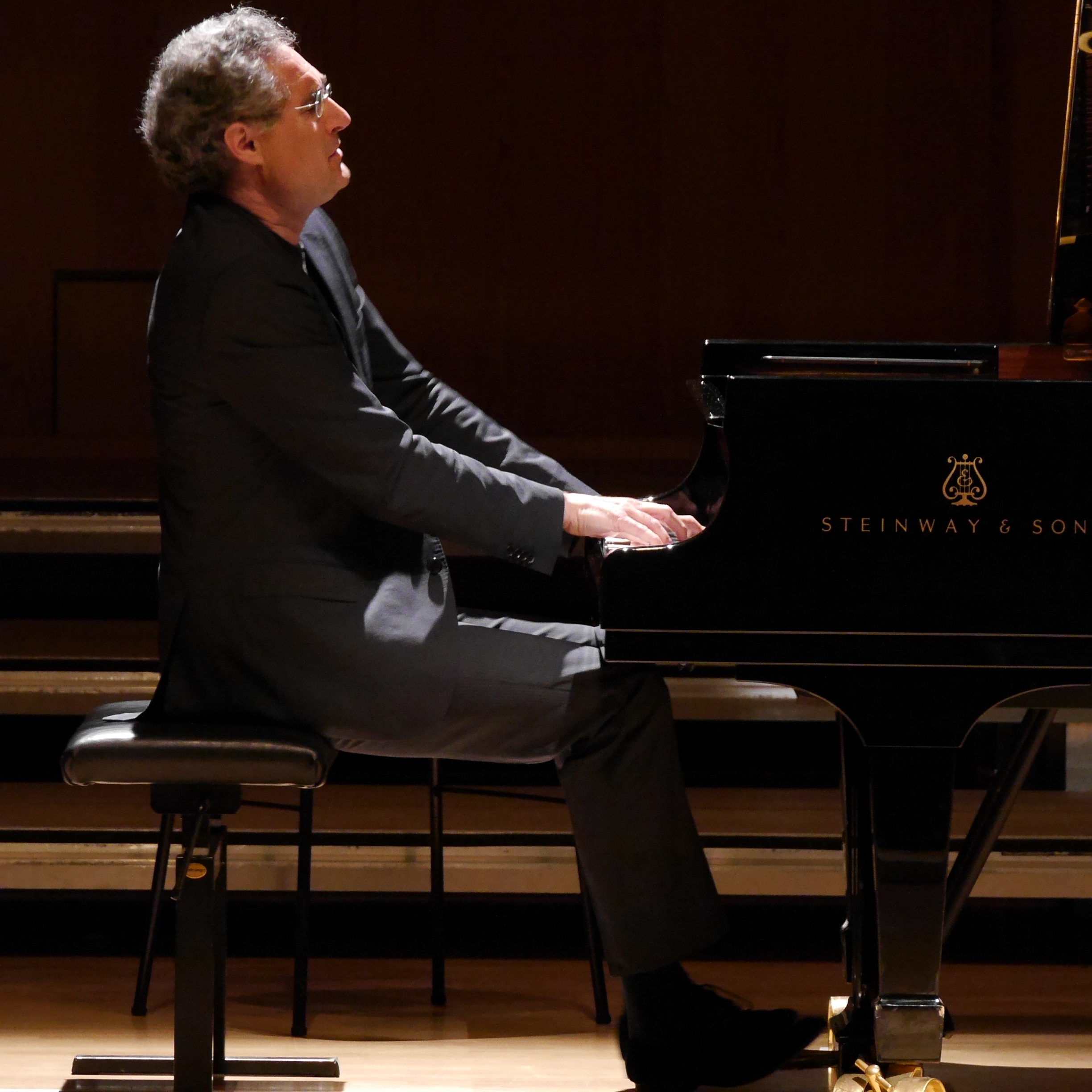
Matthias Kirschnereit (2015)

Matthias Kirschnereit (born 1962) is a German classical pianist.

== Life ==
Born in Dorsten, Kirschnereit grew up in Namibia and later studied at the Hochschule für Musik Detmold with Renate Kretschmar-Fischer. He was a prizewinner at renowned competitions in Germany and abroad, such as the Deutscher Musikwettbewerb in Bonn, the Concours Géza Anda in Zurich and the Sydney International Piano Competition. In 1989, he received the Förderpreis des Landes Nordrhein-Westfalen für junge Künstlerinnen und Künstler.

Among the ensembles with which Kirschnereit performs are the Tonhalle-Orchester Zürich, the Radio-Sinfonieorchester Stuttgart and the Lucerne Festival Strings.

In 1997, Kirschnereit, who lives in Hamburg, received a professorship at the Rostock University of Music and Theatre.

There are more than 20 CD recordings with the interpreter Kirschnereit, including a complete recording of all piano concertos by Mozart with the Bamberg Symphony Orchestra made between 1999 and 2006 on the ARTE NOVA/Sony BMG label. For the world premiere recording of the reconstructed piano concerto in E minor by Felix Mendelssohn Bartholdy together with the Robert-Schumann-Philharmonie Chemnitz conducted by Frank Beermann Kirschnereit received the ECHO Klassik in 2009. Since 2012 Kirschnereit has been artistic director of the Gezeitenkonzerte in Ostfriesland.
