= Mendelssohn Foundation =

German foundation

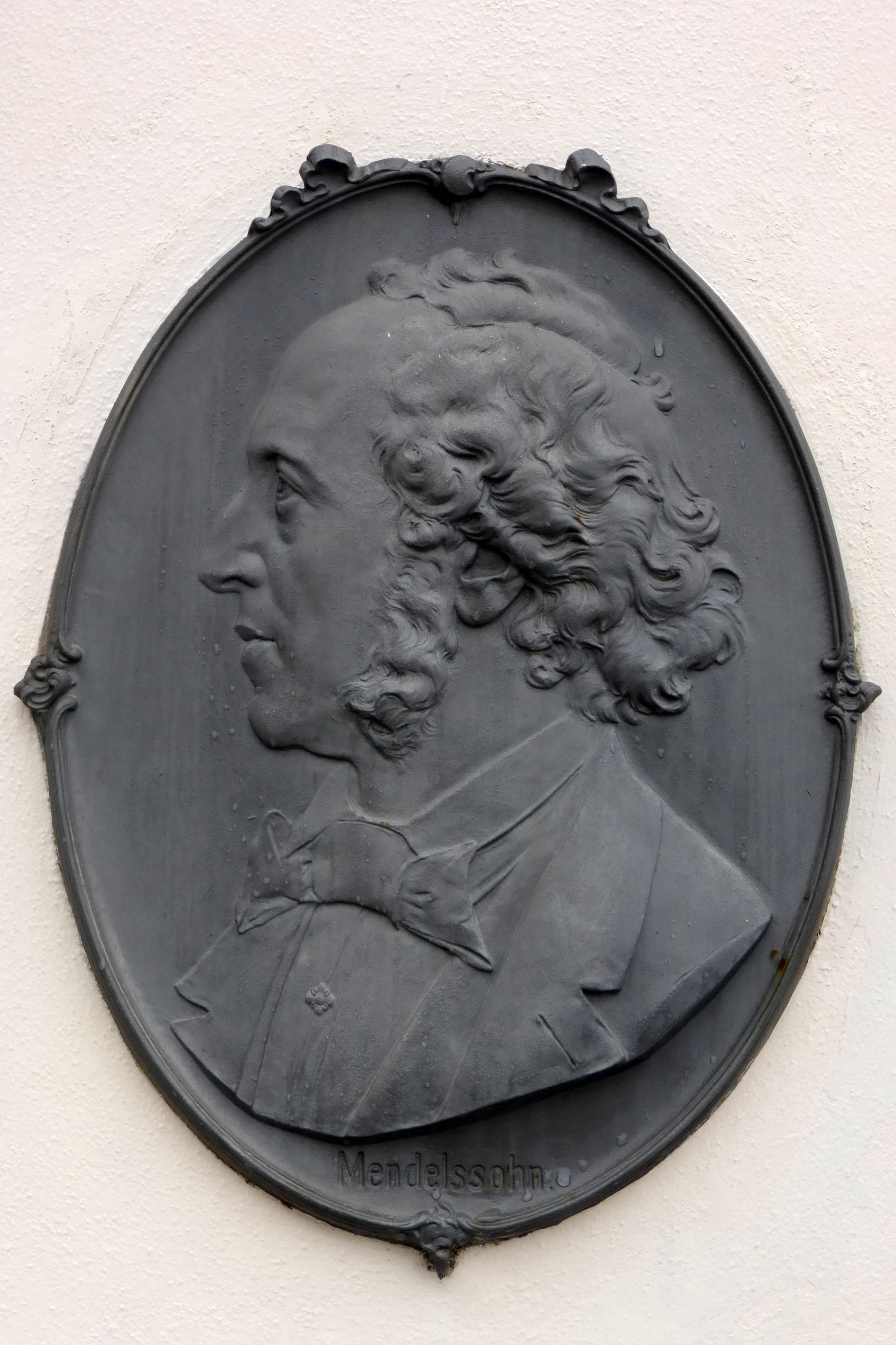
Relief of Felix Mendelssohn at the entrance of the Mendelssohn House

The Felix Mendelssohn Bartholdy Foundation is a not-for-profit independent foundation governed according to civil law. It is based in the Mendelssohn House (where the composer lived in the 1840s) in Leipzig.

== Foundation ==
Originally set up in 2003 as a fiduciary foundation, the Mendelssohn Foundation's legal status was changed in 2012 by the Leipzig city authorities, here operating in partnership with the already registered "Mendelssohn House International Mendelssohn Foundation" (Mendelssohn-Haus Internationale Mendelssohn Stiftung). This was when the Felix Mendelssohn Bartholdy Foundation became a not-for-profit independent foundation, governed according to civil law. The constitution of the restructured foundation was drawn up on 28 November 2011, and the city's financial and legal participation was agreed at a council meeting on 18 July 2012. The Mendelssohn House and the Mendelssohn Museum, together with the museum site at Goldschmidtstraße 12, were brought into the foundation. Acceptance of the new arrangements by the German Foundations Supervisory authority followed on 28 August 2012.

== Objectives ==
According to its constitution, the foundation focuses its objectives, in particular, on international research and nurture concerning the artistic and societal inheritance bequeathed by the composer and director of the Gewandhaus Orchestra (Gewandhauskapellmeister), Felix Mendelssohn (1809–1847).

In addition, the foundation is required to encourage musical training and education in a manner consistent with the priorities of the composer who founded in Leipzig Germany's first music conservatory, which bears his name as the University of Music and Theatre "Felix Mendelssohn Bartholdy" Leipzig.

The foundation is also to administer and operate the Mendelssohn Museum in the Mendelssohn House and the carriage house belonging to it.

== Activities ==
- The foundation supports the Mendelssohn Complete Output project of the Saxonian Academy of Sciences and Humanities
- The foundation issues publications and organises concerts.
- The foundation awards the Leipzig International Mendelssohn Prize.
- The foundation may award scholarships to artists of exceptional talent.
- The foundation has rescued and taken responsibility for running the Mendelssohn House acquired in 1993 by a predecessor organisation.
- The foundation had, by February 2014, invested €1.5 million in dramatically raising the standard of the displays and exhibits in the Mendelssohn-Museum accommodated in the Mendelssohn House.

== Leadership ==
The first prize winner, in 2007, of the International Mendelssohn Prize in Leipzig was the conductor Kurt Masur, one of Mendelssohn's successors as chief conductor (Gewandhauskapellmeister) of the Leipzig Gewandhaus Orchestra. Masur held the post for nearly thirty years. Masur has also played a leading part in the work of the foundation and of its predecessor entities: he was the foundation's president.

The chairman of the supervisory board is Burkhard Jung, the lord mayor of Leipzig.
