= Julia Rebekka Adler =

German viola and viola d'amore player (born 1978)

- Born: Julia Rebekka Mai; 1978 (age 47–48); Heidelberg, Baden-Württemberg, West Germany
- Website: www.maerchenbilder.com

Julia Rebekka Adler (née Mai; born 1978) is a German viola and viola d'amore player.

== Early life and education ==
Julia Rebekka Mai was born in 1978 in Heidelberg, Baden-Württemberg, West Germany.

She started playing viola at the age of six with Ute-Christine Elfert in Freiburg. Having won first prize at Jugend musiziert (Federal German competition for young musicians), she was invited to participate at the Interlochen Arts Camp and the Aspen Music Festival and School.

From 1994 to 2000, she studied with Kim Kashkashian, Johannes Lüthy, and Wolfram Christ at the Hochschule für Musik Freiburg in Freiburg. In 2004, she took master classes with Walter Levin and Yuri Bashmet in Siena, Italy. She finished her soloist-studies with Hartmut Rohde at the Berlin University of the Arts with highest honors in 2007.

From 1992 to 1997, she held a scholarship from the Deutsche Stiftung Musikleben. In 2002, Adler was awarded with the Felix Mendelssohn Bartholdy Prize for viola. She later held scholarships in the Bundesauswahl junger Künstler in both 2004 and 2005.

== Career ==
In 1994, she recorded her first CD, playing Viola Concerto No.1 by Darius Milhaud as soloist with the Landesjugendorchester Baden-Württemberg. She has appeared as soloist with the Baden-Badener Philharmonie, the Neue Philharmonie Westfalen, the Philharmonisches Kammerorchester München, and the Philharmonia of the Nations directed by Justus Frantz. Adler played at the Donaueschingen Festival, in projects of the Pellegrini-Quartett, and performed with artists such as Stéphane Picard, Tim Vogler, David Geringas, Antje Weithaas, Wen-Sinn-Yang, Julius Berger, Karl Leister, and Hans-Jörg Schellenberger.

In 2001, she was awarded both special prizes at the Gerhard Taschner Competition, and won 2nd prize with the Kuss Quartet at the International String Quartet Competition in Banff, Alberta.

In 2004, she was rated best German violist in the ARD International Music Competition, receiving the Theodor Rogler Prize. She has been co-soloist of the Munich Philharmonic and was a member of the Kuss Quartet and the Ensemble Viardot. She performs with the Solistenoktett Berlin (a string octet with Latica Honda-Rosenberg and Jens Peter Maintz, among others), and plays in duo with the Russian pianist Jascha Nemtsov.

In 2009, she recorded the four viola sonatas by Mieczysław Weinberg.

Since 2016, Adler has been co-principal violist with the Munich Philharmonic, a member of the 'Berliner Solistenoktett' and a professor for viola at the Berlin University of the Arts.
