= Luiza Borac =

Romanian pianist

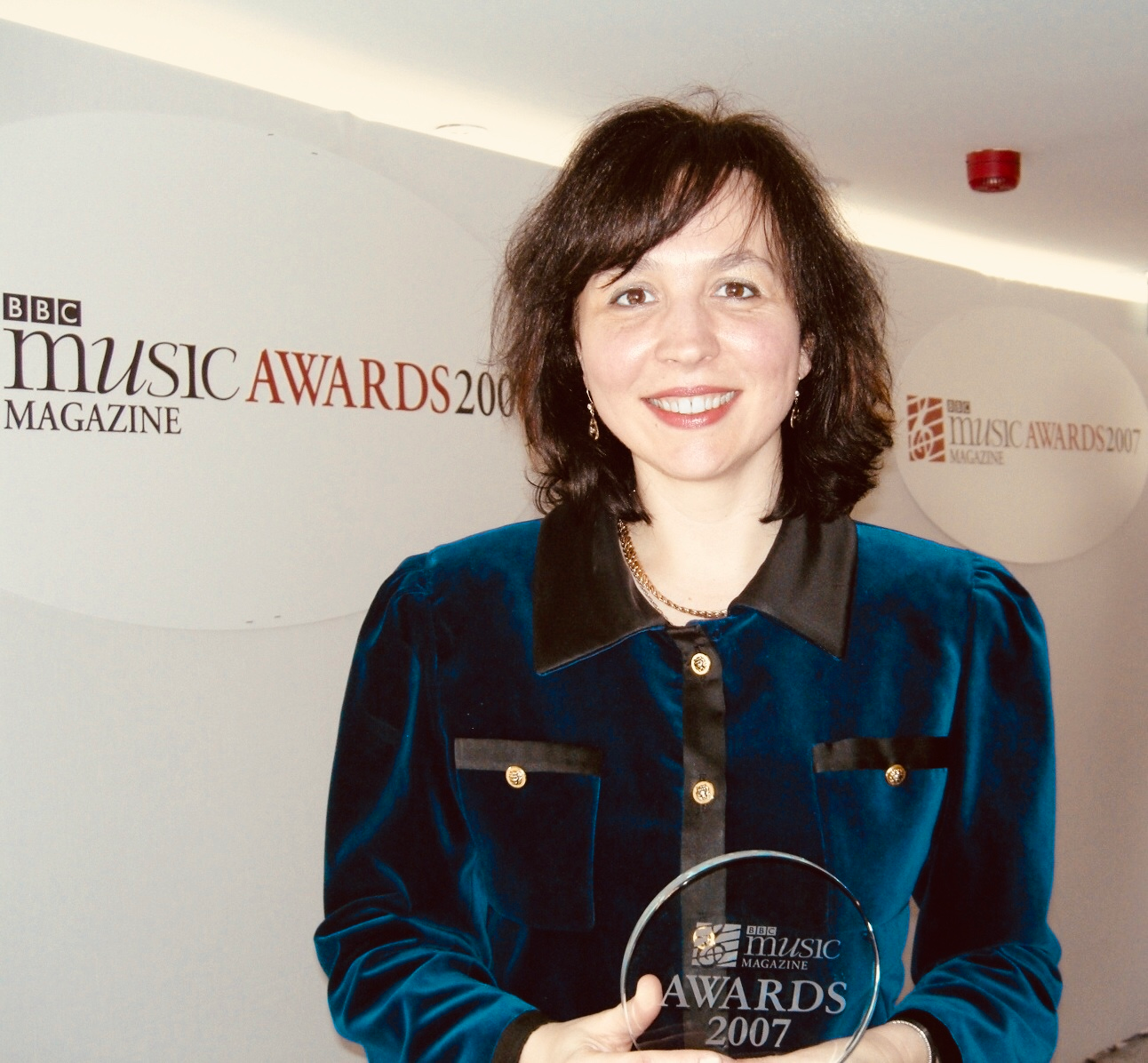
Luiza Borac, 2007

Luiza Borac is a Romanian classical pianist.

== Life ==
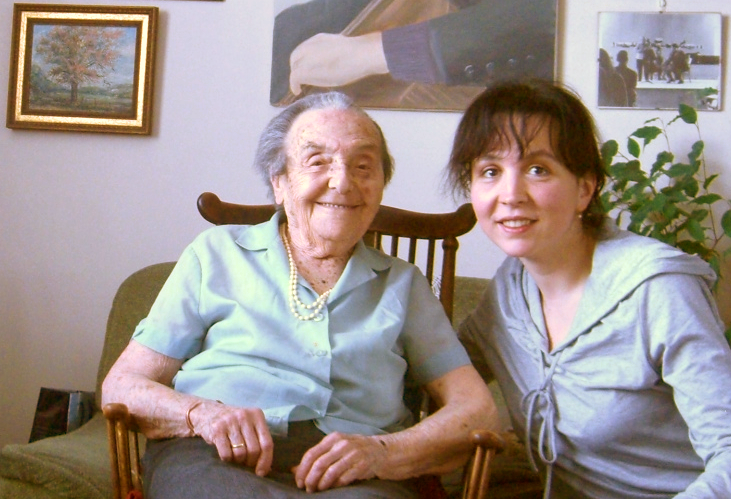
In 2010 with the pianist Alice Herz-Sommer (left)

In 2012, Borac recorded several world premiere recordings with Jaime Martin and the Academy of St Martin in the Fields of works by the pianist and composer Dinu Lipatti. The double CD was awarded 5 stars by the BBC Music Magazine and 6 stars by the magazine Pianonews as the best CD of the double month.

In March 2014, Borac received her doctorate from the Faculty of Musicology at the University of Bucharest on the piano works of George Enescu with the final grade summa cum laude.

Borac teaches piano at the Hanover Music School.

In 2015, Borac was a member of the jury of the Chopin Society for the International Piano Competition.

In 2019, the pianist played the world premiere of George Enescu's 1897 unfinished Concerto for Piano and Orchestra at the Sala Radio of the Romanian Radio Broadcasting Company.

== Awards ==
Borac is the winner of more than 30 national and international awards, Including:

- 1st prize in the Felix Mendelssohn Bartholdy Prize of the Stiftung Preußischer Kulturbesitz, Berlin,
- 1st prize at the International Music Competition Viotti-Valsesia, Italy
- Silver medal at the Gina Bachauer International Piano Competition in Salt Lake City
- Debut prize of Carnegie Hall, in New York City
- the Prix d'Oslo, the Grieg Prize and the Audience Prize at the Edvard Grieg International Piano Competition in Oslo
- 2007: Music Award of the BBC

In 1995, she was a prize winner of the Holland Music Sessions Concert Artists.

== Recordings ==
- Robert Schumann – Kinderszenen, Etudes Symphoniques op. 13 (Avie)
- Erbdrostenhof – Klavierabend mit Werken von Chopin, Liszt und Ravel (R+V)
- Ceszky Krmlov Festival – Klavierabend mit Werken von Beethoven und Schumann
- Glasgow International Piano Competition – Prizewinner Concert
- Gina Bachauer International Piano Competition – Prizewinner Concert
- WDR Orchester Köln – Chopin Variations op. 2 'La ci darem la mano' (BMG)
- George Enescu – The Three Piano Suites (Avie)
- Wanderer – Schubert and Liszt (Avie)
- Don Giovanni – Chopin, Liszt, Beethoven (ZEIT-Stiftung)
- George Enescu – The Two Piano Sonatas (Avie)
- Frédéric Chopin – 24 Etudes and 6 Polish Songs (Avie)
- Frühlingsglaube – Piano Transcriptions by Liszt and Rachmaninoff
- 2012: Piano Music of Dinu Lipatti, Aufnahme mit der Academy of St. Martin in the Fields, Portsmouth: Avie Records
- 2014: Chants Nostalgiques, mit Werken von Leopold Godowsky, Fritz Kreisler, Sergei Rachmaninov, Franz Schubert, Franz Liszt, Constantin Silvestri, Francisco Tárrega, Robert Schumann, Richard Strauss, Tiberiu Brediceanu und Gheorghe Dima sowie eine Hommage an Ion Buzea, Portsmouth: Avie Records
- 2017: Inspirations & dreams, Booklet und 2 CDs mit Werken von George Enescu, Maurice Ravel, Marcel Mihalovici, Pablo de Sarasate, Claude Debussy und Robert Schumann, Neuhausen auf den Fildern: Profil Medien
- 2019: Mozart in Love, Profil Medien
