= Kostelec nad Orlicí =

- Town
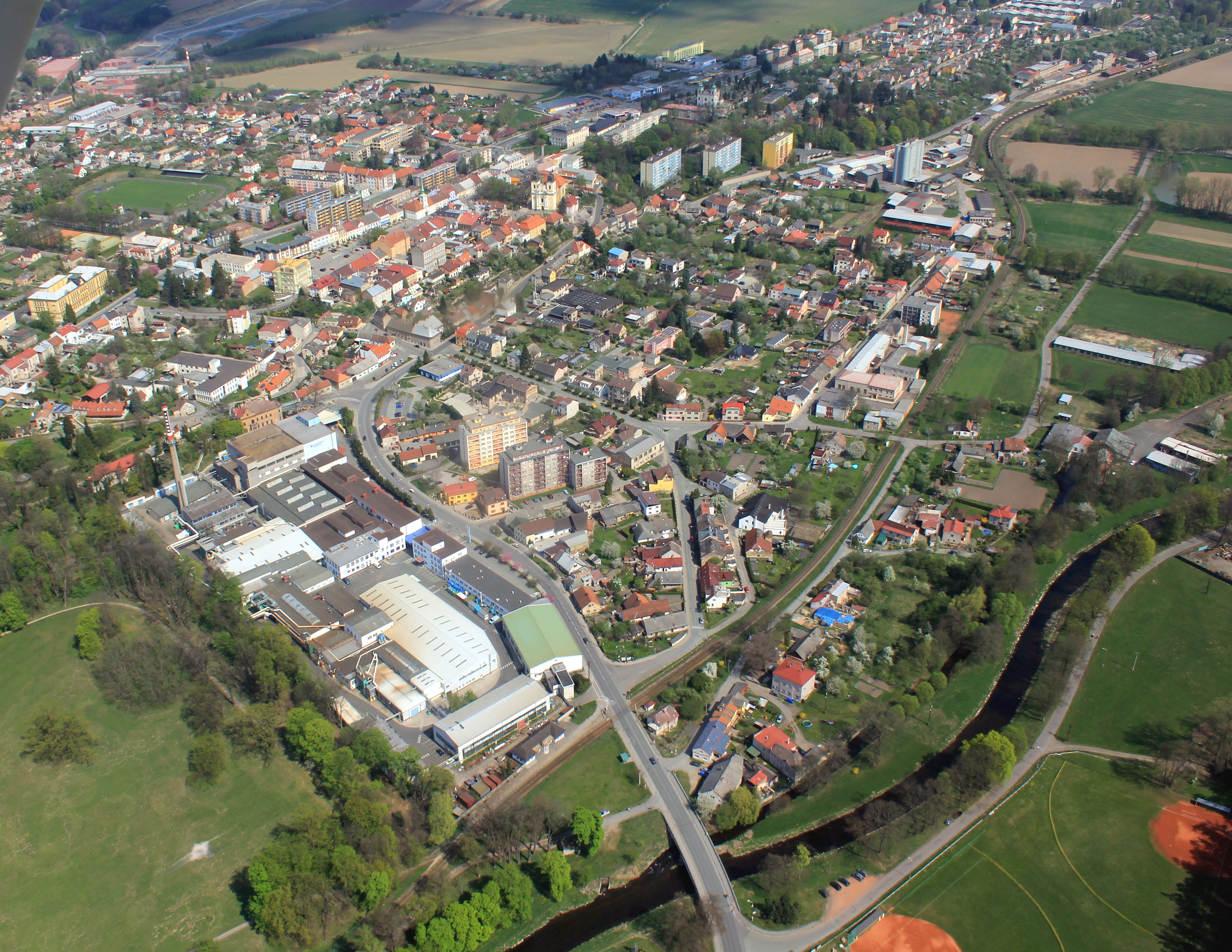
- Aerial view

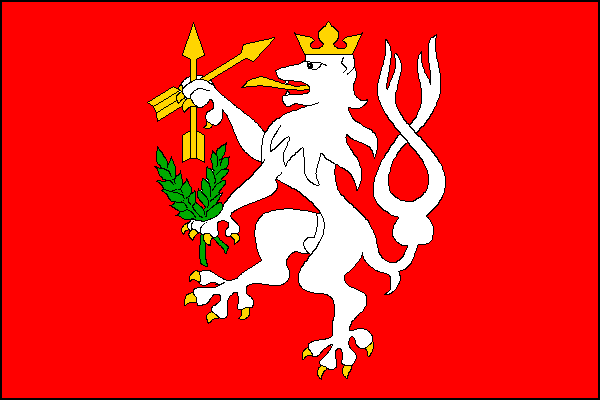
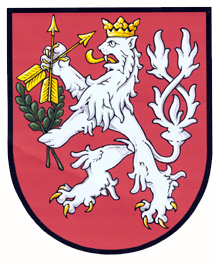
- Flag Coat of arms

- Location in the Czech Republic
- Coordinates: 50°7′22″N 16°12′41″E
- Country: Czech Republic
- Region: Hradec Králové
- District: Rychnov nad Kněžnou
- First mentioned: 1316

Government
  - Mayor: Tomáš Kytlík

Area
  - Total: 26.20 km^{2} (10.12 sq mi)
- Elevation: 273 m (896 ft)

Population (2026-01-01)
  - Total: 6,224
  - Density: 237.6/km^{2} (615.3/sq mi)
- Time zone: UTC+1 (CET)
  - Summer (DST): UTC+2 (CEST)
- Postal code: 517 41
- Website: www.kostelecno.cz

Kostelec nad Orlicí (Czech pronunciation: [ˈkostɛlɛts ˈnat orlɪtsiː]; German: Adlerkosteletz) is a town in Rychnov nad Kněžnou District in the Hradec Králové Region of the Czech Republic. It has about 6,200 inhabitants. The town is located on the Divoká Orlice River in the Orlice Table.

== Administrative division ==
Kostelec nad Orlicí consists of four municipal parts (in brackets population according to the 2021 census):

- Kostelec nad Orlicí (5,675)
- Koryta (84)
- Kostelecká Lhota (282)
- Kozodry (66)

== Etymology ==
The name Kostelec means 'fortified church' in Czech. In 1568, the suffix nad Orlicí ('upon Orlice') was added to distinguish it from other places with the same name.

== Geography ==
Kostelec nad Orlicí is located about 6 kilometres (4 mi) southwest of Rychnov nad Kněžnou and 28 km (17 mi) southeast of Hradec Králové. It lies in the Orlice Table. The highest point is at 370 m (1,214 ft) above sea level. The town is situated on the Divoká Orlice River.

== History ==
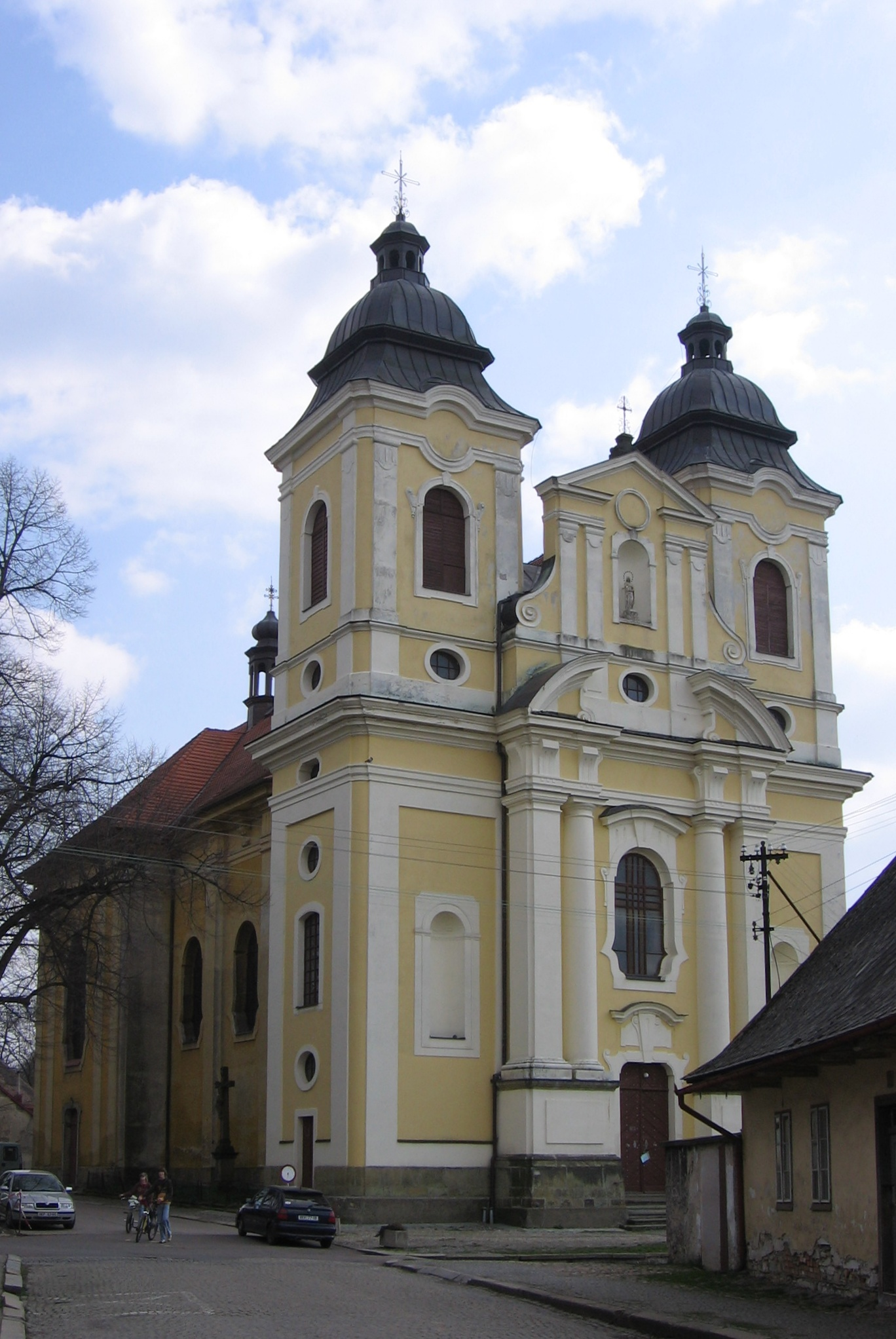
Church of Saint George

The first written mention of Kostelec nad Orlicí is from 1316, when there was a fortified church. In 1341, it was referred to as a market town for the first time. Until the 17th century, it was part of the Potštejn estate and shared its destinies and owners. In 1454, the estate was bought by King George of Poděbrady, who gave the town its coat of arms. The next owners were the Pernštejn family, and from 1558, the Hrzán of Harasov family. During their rule, Kostelec na Orlicí acquired many privileges.

In 1629, the Potštejn estate was sold to the Belgian family of Gramb. Kašpar of Gramb bequeathed all his properties to the Jesuit college in Prague, but in 1667 Kostelec was acquired by Václav Záruba of Hustířany (the husband of Františka of Gramb), who won the court case. From 1746, Kostelec and Potštejn ceased to have the same owners. In 1796, Kostelec was bought by Josef Kinsky, and his family were the last owners of the town until it gained self-government.

== Demographics ==
Historical population

Year	Pop.	±%
1869	3,690	—
1880	4,446	+20.5%
1890	5,114	+15.0%
1900	5,625	+10.0%
1910	5,887	+4.7%

Year	Pop.	±%
1921	5,681	−3.5%
1930	6,027	+6.1%
1950	6,017	−0.2%
1961	6,119	+1.7%
1970	6,052	−1.1%

Year	Pop.	±%
1980	6,690	+10.5%
1991	6,455	−3.5%
2001	6,180	−4.3%
2011	6,310	+2.1%
2021	6,107	−3.2%

Source: Censuses

== Transport ==
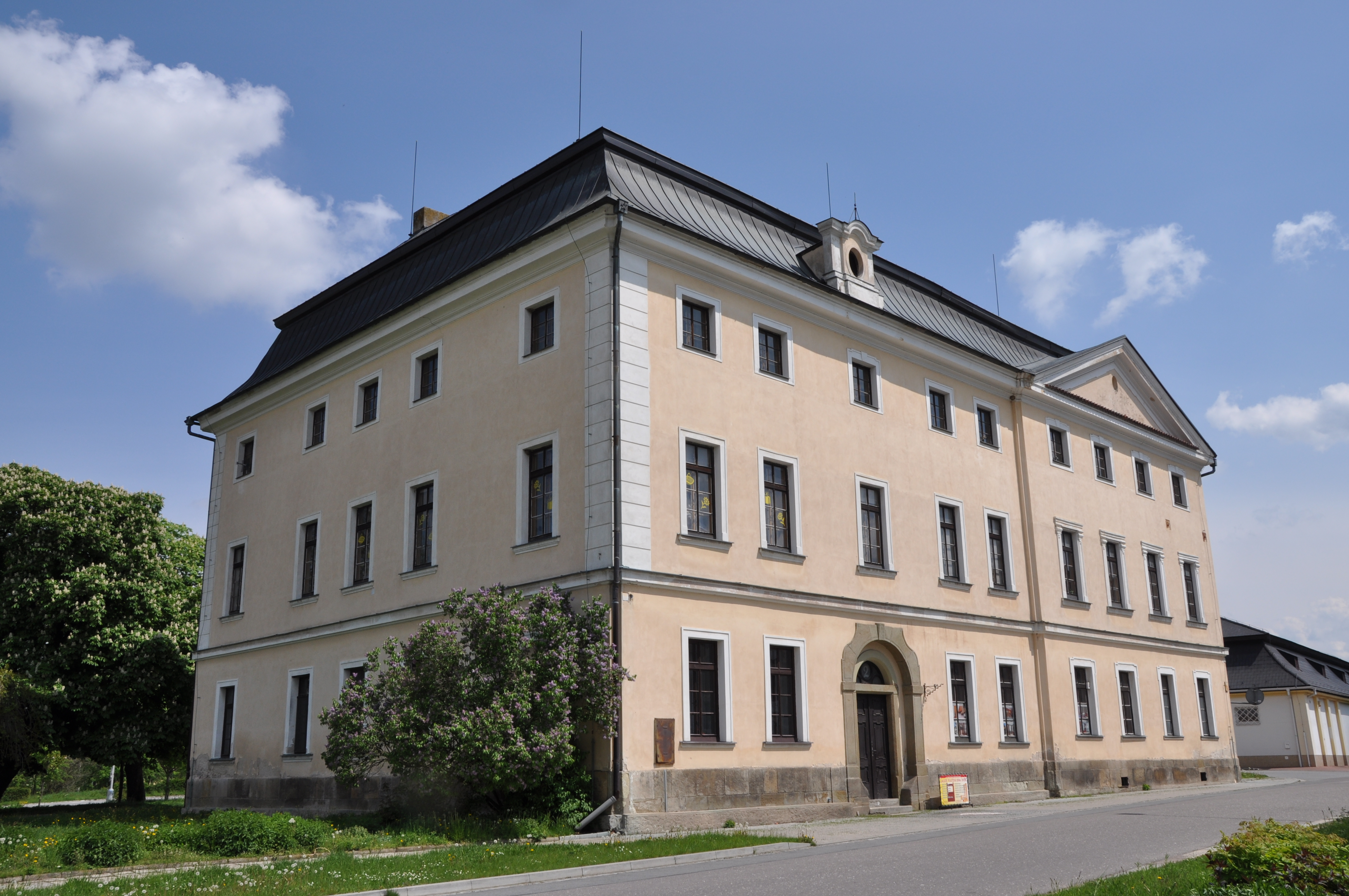
Old Castle

Kostelec nad Orlicí is located on the railway line Týniště nad Orlicí–Doudleby nad Orlicí. The town is served by two train stations: Kostelec nad Orlicí and Kostelec nad Orlicí město.

== Sights ==
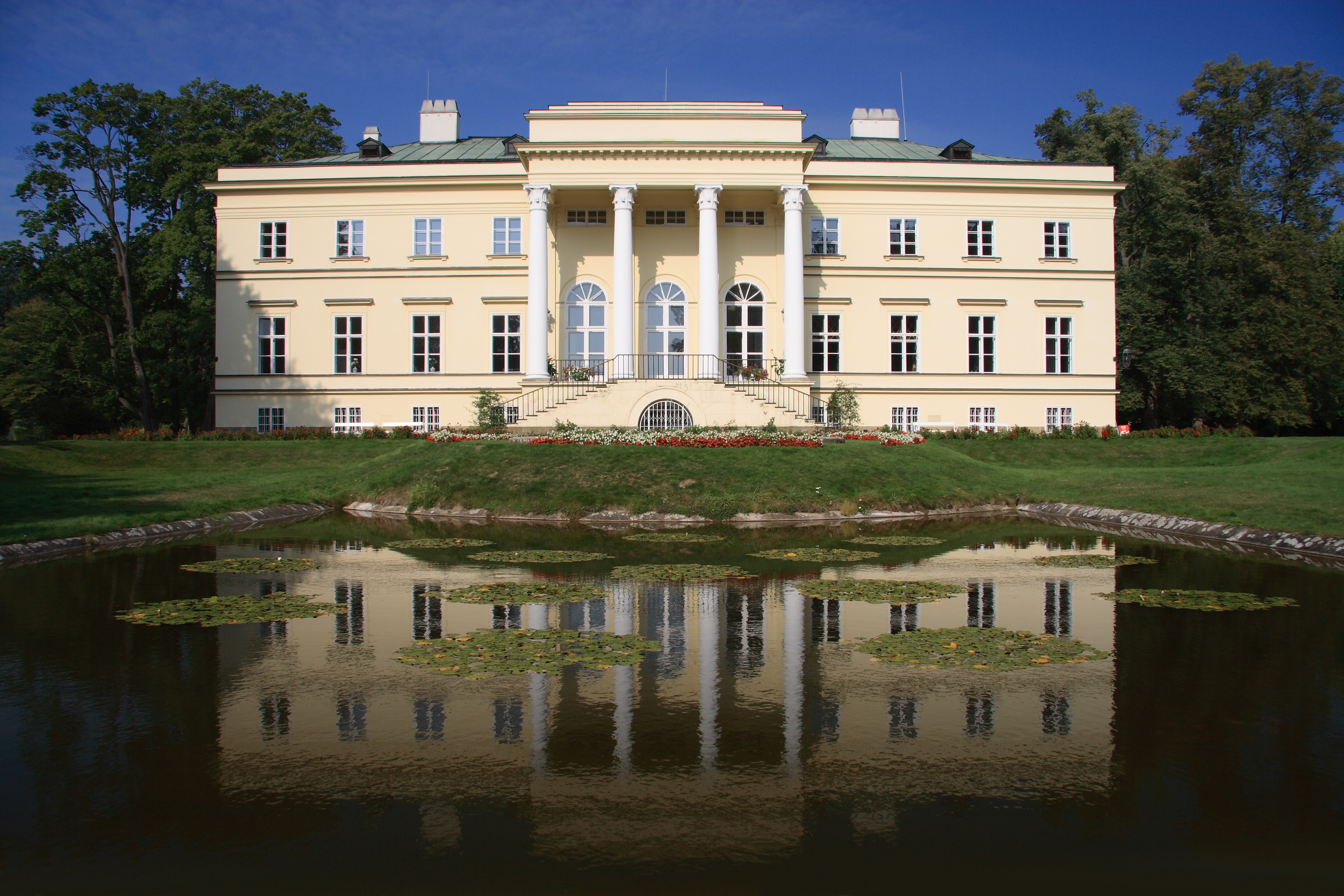
New Castle

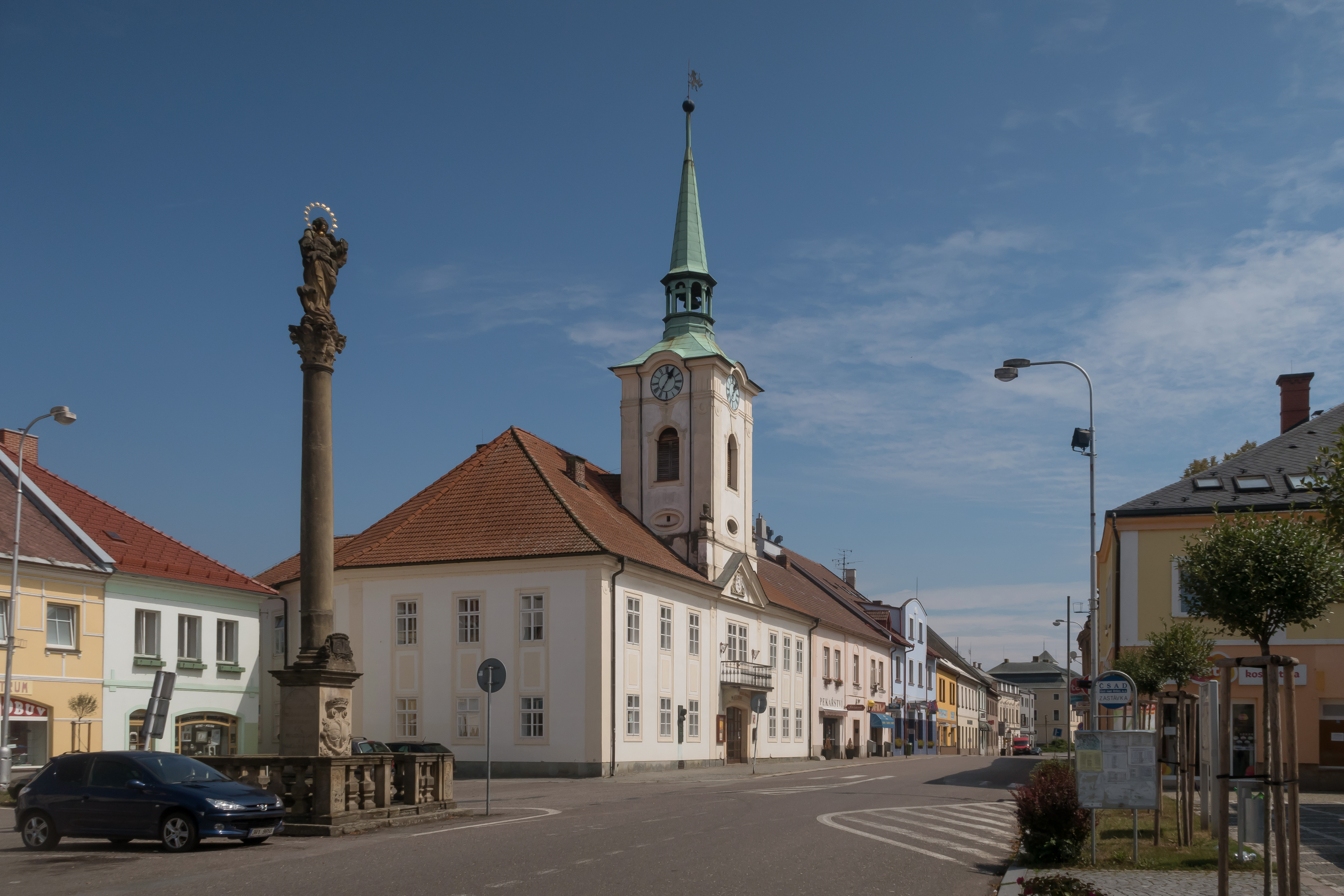
Town hall

The principal landmark of the town is the New Kostelec nad Orlicí Castle. It was built in the Empire style in 1829–1833 for the Kinsky family. Following its return to the ownership of the Kinsky family in 1992, it was restored and opened to the public. The building houses the Kinsky Gallery and an exhibition of the history of the town. The castle complex includes a large park, which is protected as a nature reserve.

The Old Castle was originally a Renaissance fortress built before 1620 and reconstructed in 1668 and 1770. After the New Castle was built, it was transformed into a manor house and served the needs of officials.

Existence of the Church of Saint George is first documented in 1323. In 1769–1773, the original Gothic church was replaced by the current late Baroque building.

== Notable people ==
- František Tůma (1704–1774), composer
- Egon Ledeč (1889–1944), violinist and composer

== Twin towns – sister cities ==
Kostelec nad Orlicí is twinned with:

- Bielawa, Poland
- Dubove, Ukraine
- Myjava, Slovakia
- Zeulenroda-Triebes, Germany
