= Konstantin Wolff =

German basse baritone

Konstantin Wolff (born 12 October 1978 in Lahn-Gießen) is a German operatic bass baritone.

== Life ==
Wolff studied with Donald Litaker at the Hochschule für Musik Karlsruhe and was awarded a scholarship. He made his opera debut in 2005 at the Opéra National de Lyon under the direction of William Christie in Monteverdi's L’incoronazione di Poppea.

== Awards ==
- 2004: Felix Mendelssohn Bartholdy Prize.
