= Konstanze von Gutzeit =

German woman cellist

Konstanze von Gutzeit (born 8 October 1985) is a German cellist.

== Life ==
Gutzeit was born in Bochum. At the age of 3, she began playing the cello on a converted viola as a student of Margret Wortelmann at the Musikschule Bochum. She received further instruction from Wolfgang Sellner, the solo cellist of the Bochumer Symphoniker, and Professor Wilfried Tachezi in Linz.

In 1998, she began her studies at the University of Music and Performing Arts Vienna with Heinrich Schiff. Gutzeit plays an original instrument by Gioffredo Cappa from 1677, which was made available to her by the Schulte-Uentrop Foundation.

Gutzeit made her debut as a soloist with the Pro Musica Orchestra Salzburg at the age of 12. Since then, she has performed with numerous renowned orchestras, including the Orchestre Philharmonique de Monte Carlo, the Bochum Symphony Orchestra, the Northwest German Philharmonic, the Vienna Chamber Orchestra, the Brandenburgisches Staatsorchester Frankfurt (Oder), the Bruckner Orchestra Linz, the Stuttgart Chamber Orchestra and the Tiroler Symphonieorchester Innsbruck led by conductors such as Kurt Masur, Marek Janowski, Michael Hofstetter, Toshiyuki Kamioka, Heribert Beissel and Ingo Ingensand.

== Prizes ==
Since 1991, she has participated many times in the Jugend musiziert competitions and won first prizes in both the violoncello and chamber music categories at the national competition, most recently with the highest score in the solo competition in 2004.

As a member of the "Clara Schumann Piano Trio" she has performed at the Salzburg Festival, the Rheingau Musik Festival, the Festspiele Mecklenburg-Vorpommern and in Japan, and with this ensemble she has also won the Eduard-Söring-Prize of the Deutsche Stiftung Musikleben and the Classic Prize of the WDR and the City of Münster. At the age of 16, she was the youngest participant in the Austrian competition for young musicians "Gradus ad Parnassum" in 2001, winning 1st prize and also the so-called "Grand Prize" in all categories
