= Bukówka, Lower Silesian Voivodeship =

Bukówka
- Village
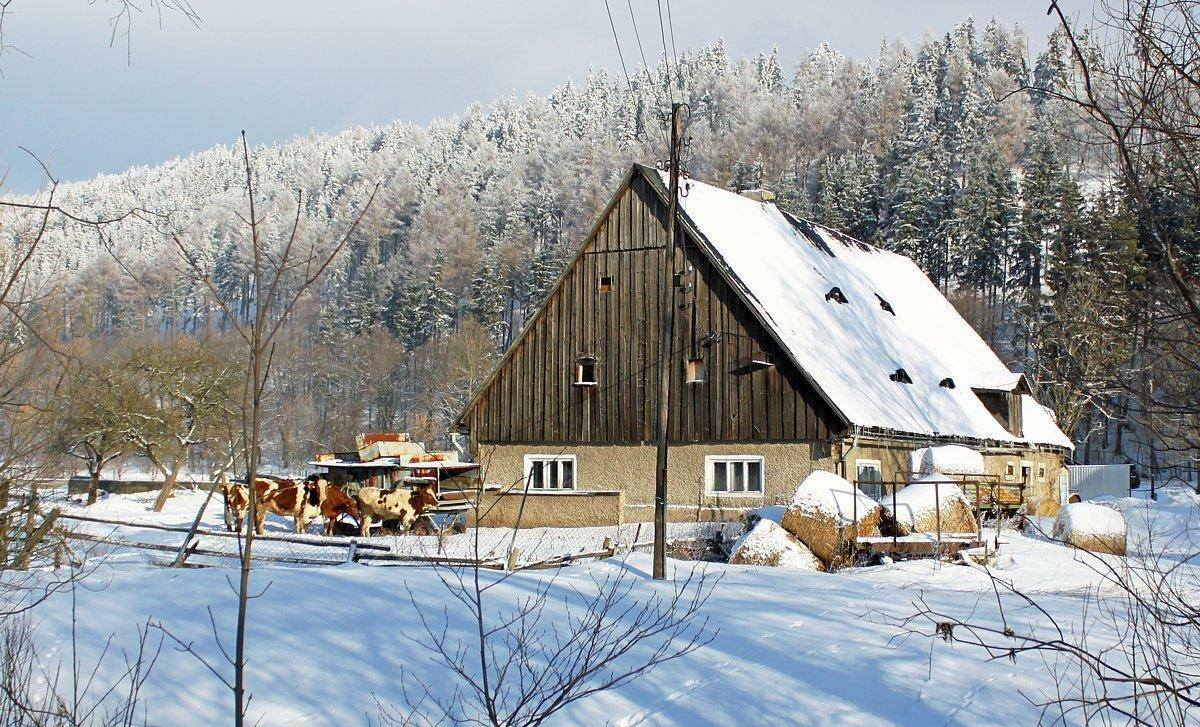

- Location within Poland
- Coordinates: 50°42′34″N 15°57′44″E
- Country: Poland
- Voivodeship: Lower Silesian
- County: Kamienna Góra
- Gmina: Lubawka

Bukówka [buˈkufka] is a village in the administrative district of Gmina Lubawka, within Kamienna Góra County, Lower Silesian Voivodeship, in south-western Poland.

== Notable people ==
- The composer Conrad Ansorge was born in the village.
