= Cornelius Meister =

German conductor and pianist

Cornelius Meister (born 23 February 1980 in Hannover) is a German conductor and pianist.

== Biography ==
Meister's father, Konrad Meister, was a pianist and professor of piano at the Musikhochschule Hannover. His mother is also a piano teacher. His half-brother, Rudolf Meister, is also a pianist and is Rector of the Musikhochschule Mannheim.

Meister studied piano and conducting at the Hochschule für Musik und Theater Hannover. Besides his father, his teachers in Hannover included Martin Brauss and Eiji Oue. Meister also studied music at the Salzburg Mozarteum, with such teachers as Dennis Russell Davies and Karl Kamper. He was a prize winner at the 1996 Southwest German Chamber Music Competition, a winner of the Radeberger Award and the Audience Award at the 1998 Schleswig-Holstein Musik Festival, and a recipient in 2000 of a prize of the Deutscher Musikwettbewerb.

From 2001 to 2002, Meister was an assistant conductor at the Theater Erfurt. He has also worked as a Kapellmeister at the Staatsoper Hannover. In September 2005, he became Generalmusikdirektor of Heidelberg, then the youngest general music director of Germany. In October 2008, he extended his Heidelberg contract through 2012, at which time his Heidelberg tenure concluded.

In September 2010, Meister became Chief Conductor and Artistic Director of the Vienna Radio Symphony Orchestra (Vienna RSO), with an initial contract of four years. In February 2015, the orchestra announced the extension of his Vienna RSO contract through to 2018. With the Vienna RSO, he has commercially recorded music of Gottfried von Einem and Béla Bartók. Meister concluded his tenure with the Vienna RSO in 2018.

In June 2016, Meister was named the next Generalmusikdirektor (GMD) of the Stuttgart State Opera and of the Stuttgart State Orchestra, effective at the start of the 2018–2019 season, with an initial contract for six seasons. In October 2022, the Staatsoper Stuttgart and the Staatsorchesters Stuttgart announced the extension of Meister's contract as GMD through 2026. In April 2024, Meister announced that he is to stand down as GMD in Stuttgart at the close of his current contract in 2026.

Outside of Europe, Meister made his US conducting debut with San Francisco Opera in September 2009. He continues to perform chamber music in a clarinet-piano duo with Clemens Trautmann.

Married since 2006, Meister and his wife have two sons.

Cultural offices
Preceded by Volker Christ	Generalmusikdirektor, Heidelberg Opera and Heidelberg Philharmonic Orchestra; 2005–2012	Succeeded by Yordan Kamdzhalov
Preceded by Bertrand de Billy	Chief Conductor, Vienna Radio Symphony Orchestra; 2010–2018	Succeeded by Marin Alsop
Preceded by Sylvain Cambreling	Generalmusikdirektor, Staatsoper Stuttgart; 2018–present	Succeeded by incumbent
