= Markus Schön =

German clarinettist

Markus Schön (born 1971) is a German classical clarinettist.

== Life ==
Schön studied clarinet with Eduard Brunner, Hans-Dietrich Klaus and Hans Deinzer. He was twice included in the Bundesauswahl Konzerte Junger Künstler. In 1999, he won the Felix Mendelssohn Bartholdy Prize of the German Universities of Music.

Schön has been principal clarinettist of the Bavarian State Opera since 2003 and as such has been a regular guest of the Scottish Chamber Orchestra, the Deutsche Kammerphilharmonie Bremen, the Deutsches Symphonie Orchester Berlin, the Symphonieorchester of the Bayerischen Rundfunks and the Concertgebouw Amsterdam. Since 2005, he has dedicated himself to playing on historical clarinets and is an increasingly sought-after chamber musician in this field. Since 2013, he is professor for wind chamber music at the University of Music and Performing Arts Graz. From 2015 to 2016, he was professor for clarinet at the Folkwang University of the Arts in Essen.
