= Ulrich Simon =

Ulrich [Richard] Ernst Simon (21 September 1913 in Berlin – 31 July 1997 in London) was an Anglican theologian of German Jewish origin.

Simon had known Thomas Mann during his childhood in Berlin and Dietrich Bonhoeffer was another near neighbour. Simon's family were non-practising Jews but their lives were at risk from the Nazis and, after flirting with the Communists, Ulrich Simon was sent to England in 1933. His father, the composer James Simon, was murdered in Auschwitz concentration camp in 1944. His older brother, Jörn Martin Simon, died in the Moscow Trials in 1937. His mother Anna Levy Simon, escaped to Switzerland where she died about 1975. She was the sister of noted Roman Law scholar, Ernst Levy.

Simon converted to Anglicanism and was made a deacon in 1938 and ordained priest in 1939. He was University Lecturer, King's College London, 1945–60, Reader in Theology 1960–72, Professor of Christian Literature 1972–80, Dean 1978–80. Ulrich Simon was a man of many paradoxes. He wrote two books on heaven, Heaven in the Christian Tradition (1958) and The Ascent to Heaven (1961), and the hope that it embodies. Yet there was a side of him which was deeply pessimistic. The phrase "sick humanity" occurs frequently in his autobiography, and he was deeply distrustful of liberalism, both the ineffective liberalism, as he saw of it, of his German childhood, and the theological liberalism of more recent times. Yet there was always hope, perhaps most in playing or listening to the string quartets of his beloved Haydn and Mozart; his last act, the day before he died, was to get his violin restrung.

== Works ==
- Theology of Salvation a study of Isaiah 40–55 (1953)
- Heaven in the Christian Tradition (1958)
- The Ascent to Heaven (1961)
- The end is not yet: a study in Christian eschatology (1964)
- A Theology of Auschwitz (1967)
- Sitting in Judgement autobiography (1978)
- Atonement (1987)
- Pity and terror (1989)
