= Mendelssohn House =

Museum and composer's home

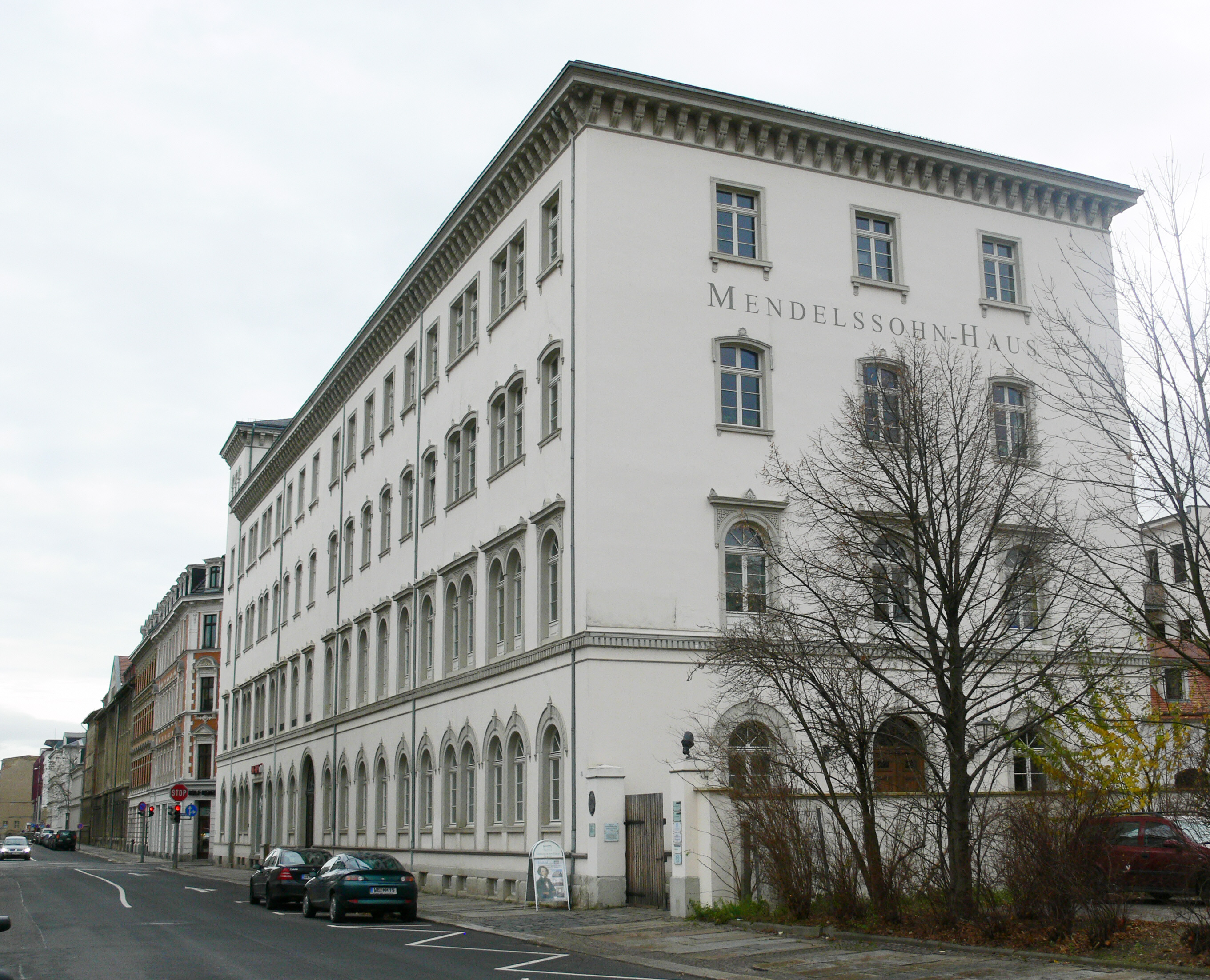
- Interactive map of the Mendelssohn House area

General information
- Location: Mendelssohn-Haus; Goldschmidtstraße 12; 04103 Leipzig, Germany
- Coordinates: 51°20′10″N 12°23′0″E

Website
- https://www.mendelssohn-stiftung.de/en/

Mendelssohn House is a museum in Leipzig in Saxony, Germany. The composer Felix Mendelssohn lived here from 1845 until his death in 1847; it now contains a collection about the life and work of the composer.

== Background ==
Mendelssohn was born in Hamburg in 1809, and in 1811 the family moved to Berlin.

He moved to Leipzig in 1835, when he was appointed director of the Gewandhaus Orchestra. In 1841 he left the city to take up the post of court composer to Friedrich Wilhelm IV in Berlin; during his time there he remained guest conductor of the orchestra in Leipzig. He resigned from his posts in Berlin in 1844 and returned to Leipzig; he moved with his family in 1845 to an apartment on the second floor of this building (its address, then Königstraße 5, is now Goldschmidtstraße 12).

During the time he lived here, his daughter Elisabeth was born. He was joint director, with Niels Gade, of the 1845–46 season of Gewandhaus concerts. In 1846 he completed his oratorio Elijah, and conducted its premiere in Birmingham, England.

Mendelssohn died in Leipzig on 4 November 1847.

== The museum ==
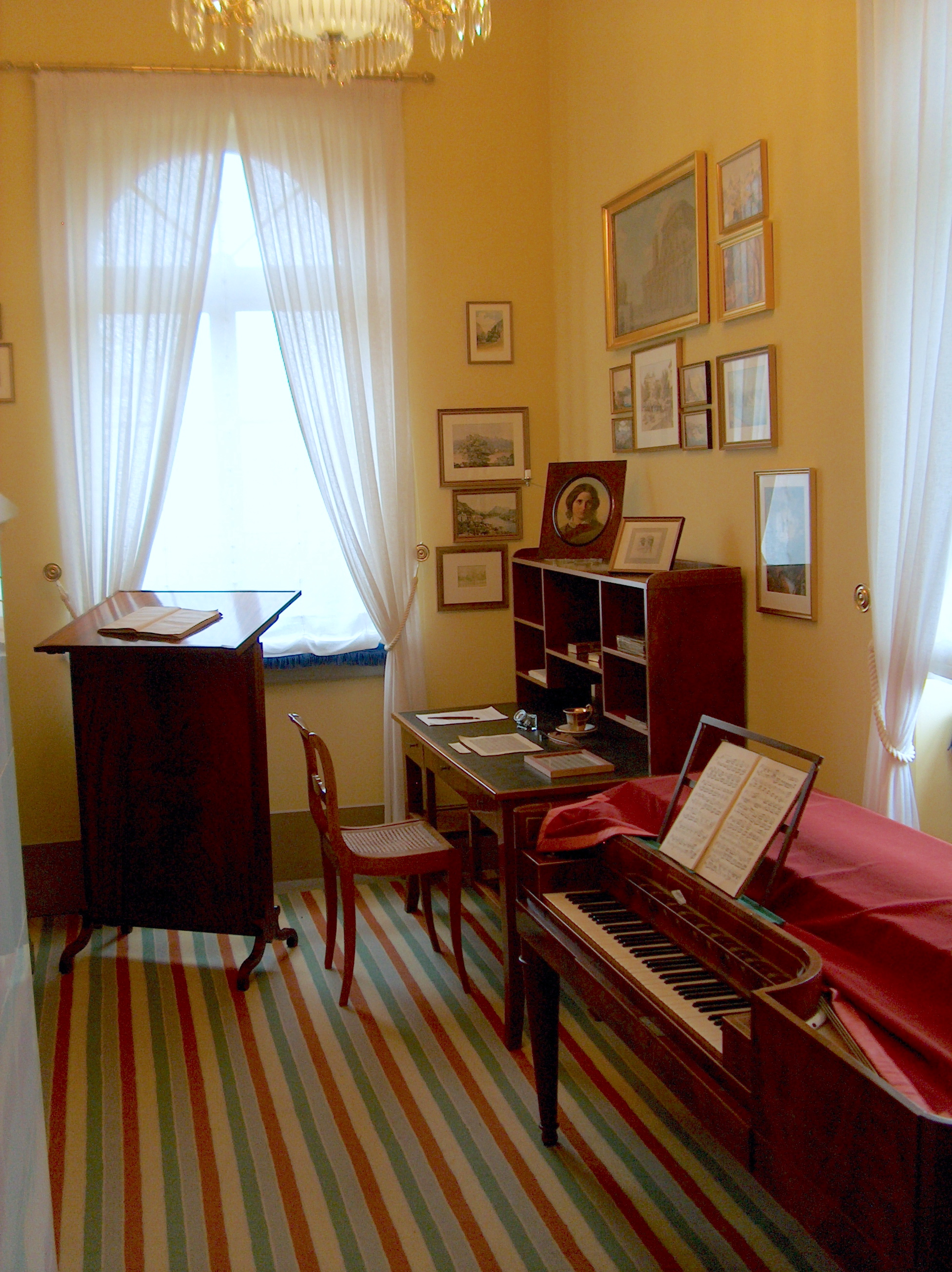
Mendelssohn's study, a room in the museum.

The International Mendelssohn Foundation was founded in 1991, with Kurt Masur as chairman; its purpose was to save and restore Mendelssohn's last home in Leipzig. The museum was opened in 1997.

It has been restored to the appearance it had during the composer's time here, furnished in the style of late Biedermeier. There is information about Mendelssohn's life and work, particularly about his time in Leipzig; there are written documents, music scores, and watercolours painted by the composer. The museum has a music salon where concerts are held.

The museum is included in the Blaubuch (Blue Book) of the Federal Government, as an important cultural site.

== Felix Mendelssohn Bartholdy Foundation ==
The Felix Mendelssohn Bartholdy Foundation was formed in 2003, supported by the town council of Leipzig. It aims to support complete editions of Mendelssohn's works (of music, letters and paintings), and to support young musicians.

The International Mendelssohn Academy at the Mendelssohn House was founded by Kurt Masur in 2008. It offers courses, led by highly regarded musicians, in singing, conducting or other aspects of music making.

== See also ==
- List of music museums
