= Renate Kretschmar-Fischer =

German classical pianist

Renate Kretschmar-Fischer (1 June 1925 – 4 September 2016) was a German pianist and piano professor at the Hochschule für Musik Detmold.

== Life ==
Born in Lüdenscheid, After the war, Kretschmar-Fischer first studied medicine in Greifswald and then music at what was then the Northwest German Music Academy in Detmold, now the Detmold College of Music. She was trained as a pianist in the master class of Conrad Hansen. She was a scholarship holder for several years at the Music Summer School in Bryanston in England, where Artur Schnabel, Monique Haas, George Enescu, Nadja Boulanger and Igor Stravinsky taught.

After her exams, Kretschmar-Fischer gave concerts as a soloist, chamber music partner and song accompanist and was appointed to a professorship for the artistic main subject piano at the Detmold Academy of Music. During her more than 40 years of activity at this academy, she taught young pianists from numerous countries, for example Birgitta Wollenweber, Peter Kreutz, Christian Köhn, Matthias Kirschnereit, Heidrun Holtmann, Stephan Imorde, Babette Dorn, Constantin Alex, Beatrice Berthold, Caroline Weichert, Volker Banfield and Silke-Thora Matthies, many of whom now teach as professors themselves. She has been a jury member at numerous national and international competitions and has given master classes in Europe and Japan. She was a member of the honorary board of the International Chopin Society.

Married with the concert and oratorio singer Helmut Kretschmar, Kretschmar-Fischer died in Hamburg at the age of 91.
