= Rostock University of Music and Theatre =

German music, theatre, and dance university

Coordinates: 54°05′30″N 12°08′40″E

Rostock University of Music and Drama (HMT)
- Hochschule für Musik und Theater Rostock
- Type: Public
- Established: 1994
- Rector: Benjamin Lang
- Students: c. 550
- Location: Rostock, Mecklenburg-Vorpommern, Germany
- Website: www.hmt-rostock.de?L=1

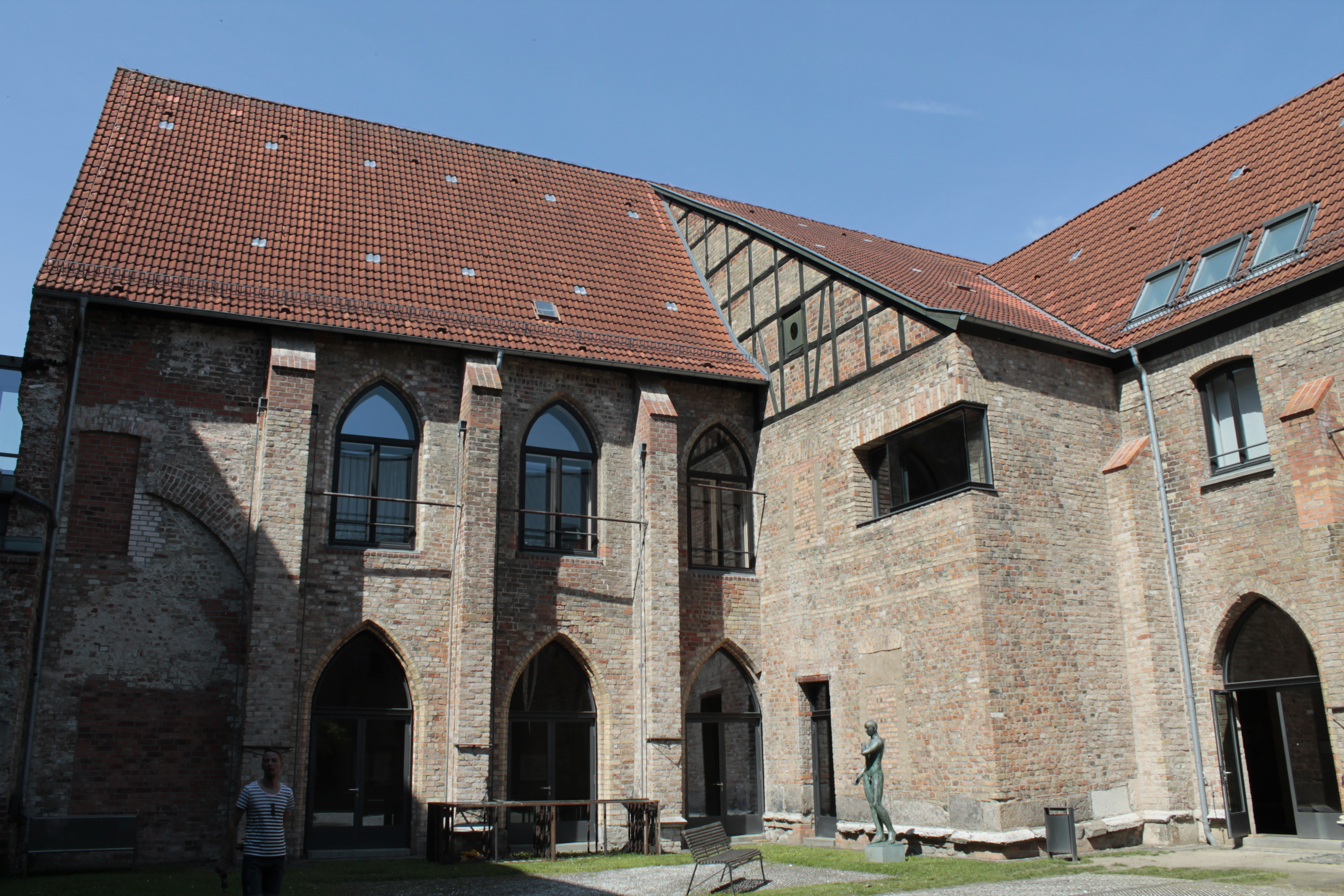
HMT Rostock

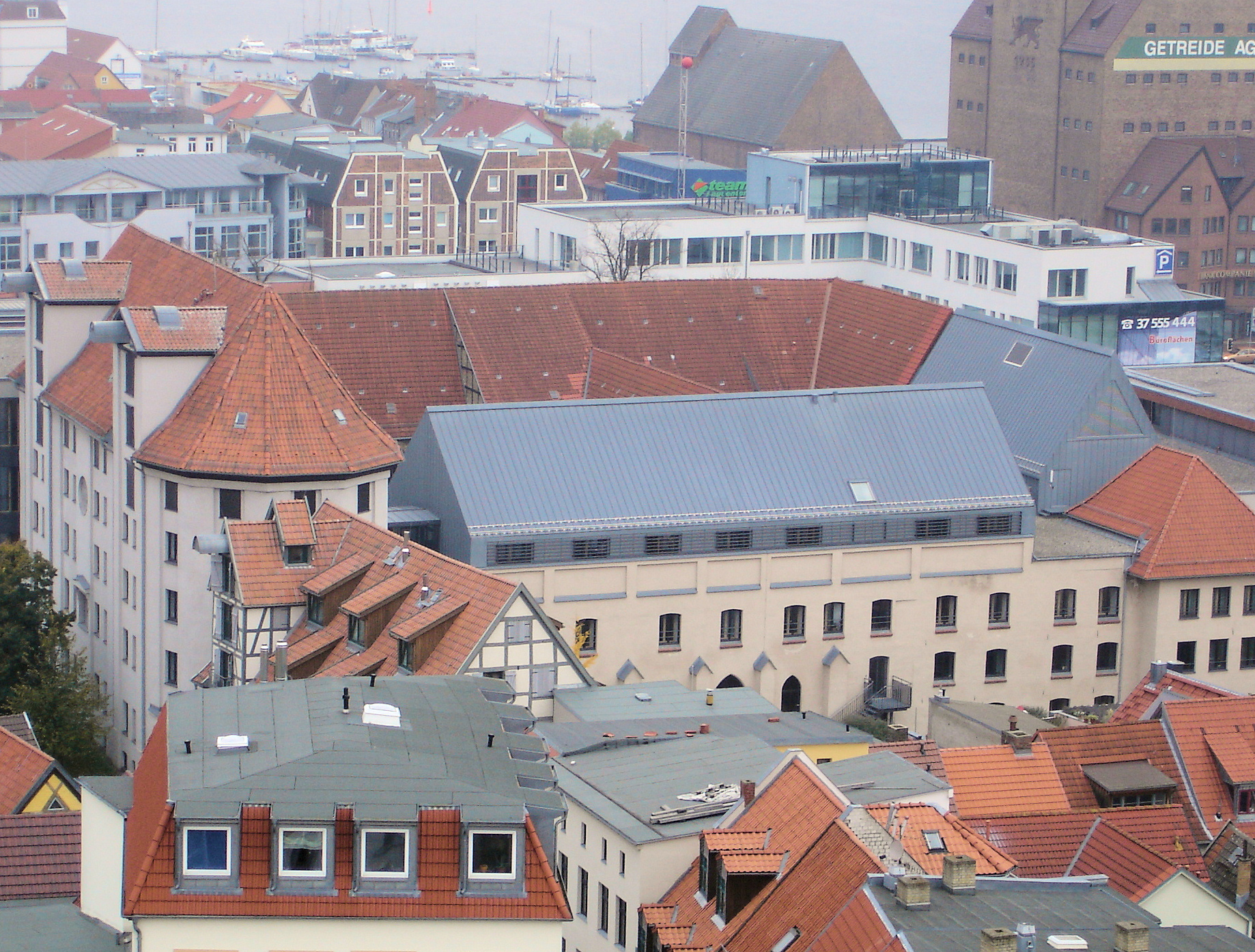
HMT Rostock from above, historical St. Katharinen abbey complex

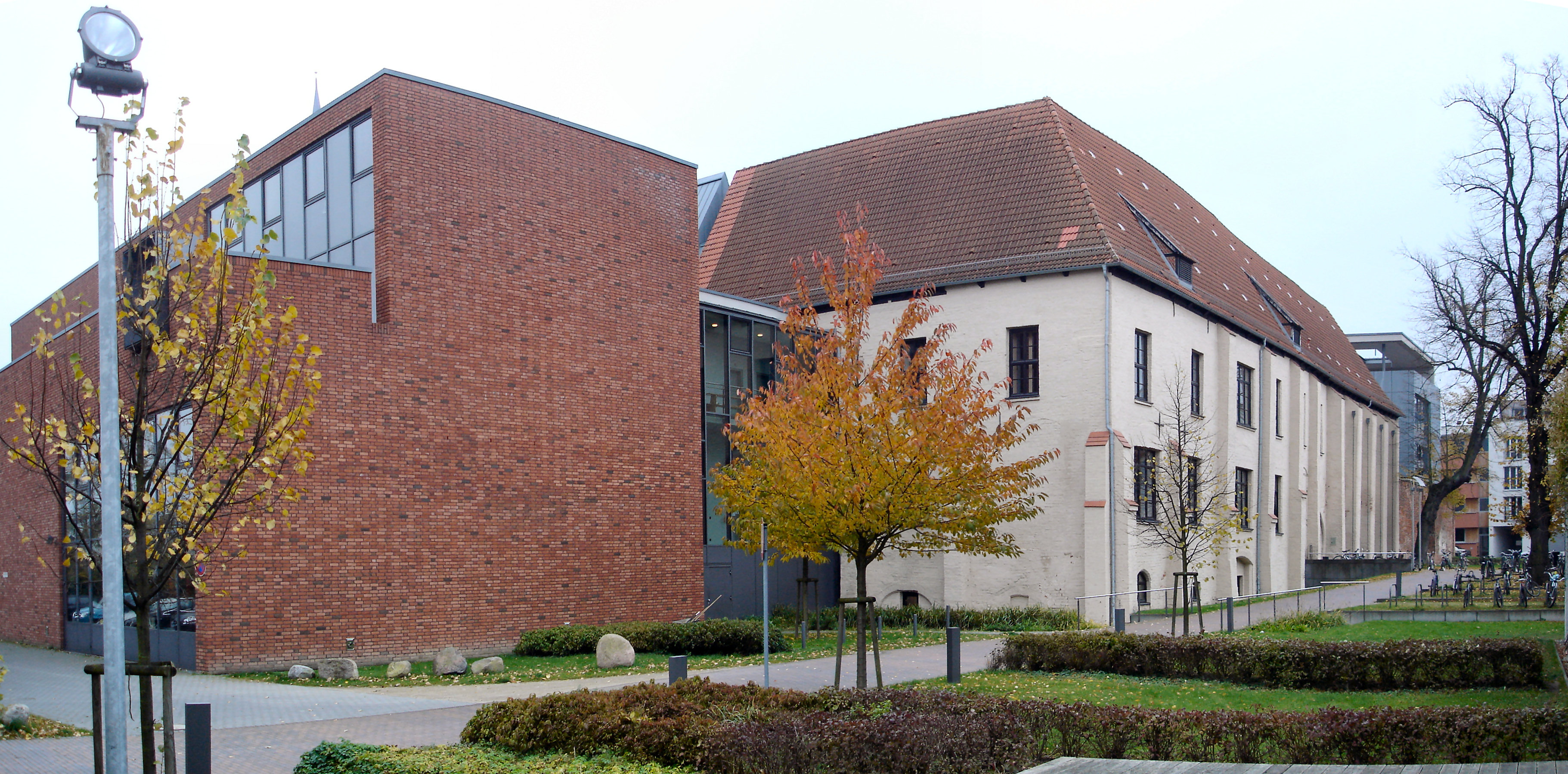
HMT Rostock

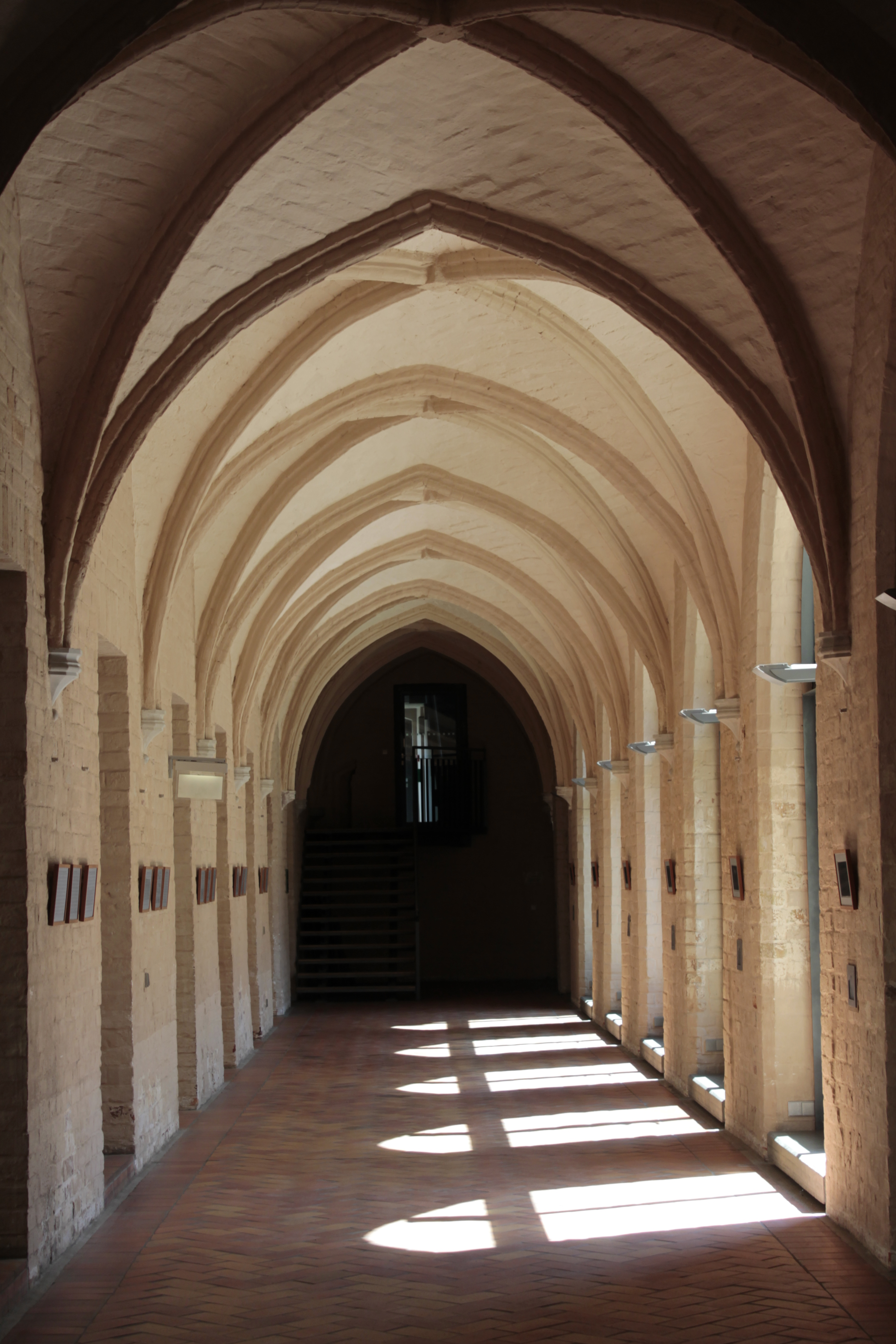
Interior, cloister vault of the historical abbey St. Katharinen

The Rostock University of Music and Drama (short HMT, Hochschule für Musik und Theater Rostock in German) is a college of music in Rostock, Mecklenburg, Germany. It opened in 1994 and is situated in a former abbey called Katharinenkloster in the historical core of the city. The college was a member of the Association of Baltic Academies of Music until this association was dissolved in 2016.

== History ==
In 1947, a University of Music, Theatre and Dance was inaugurated in Rostock under the direction of the composer Rudolf Wagner-Régeny. In 1978, it became a branch of the Hans Eisler University of Music in Berlin and was directed by Professor Karl-Heinz Will up until 1990. After the political revolution of 1989, this branch was incorporated into the University of Rostock as the department of musical science.

The Rostock College of Drama (Staatliche Schauspielschule Rostock) was founded in 1968 as the state drama school in Rostock, which in the 80s was turned into a branch of the "Ernst Busch" Academy of Dramatic Art in Berlin. By the turn of 1990/91, the college became the Academy of Dramatic Art of Mecklenburg-Vorpommern, a German federal state, and was temporarily continued as the drama department of the University of Rostock.

The University of Music and Drama in Rostock was legally established by the government of Mecklenburg-West Pomerania on January 1, 1994. The founding rector was Professor Wilfrid Jochims from the University of Music in Cologne. Today, the Rostock University of Music and Drama is a favourite choice among students throughout Europe. The previous rectors at hmt Rostock were Professor Wilfrid Jochims (01.01.1994 - 30.09.2001), Professor Dr Hartmut Möller (01.10.2001 - 31.05.2004), Professor Christfried Göckeritz (01.10.2004-30. 09.2012), Professor Dr Susanne Winnacker (01.10.2012 - 31.10.2019), Professor Dr Oliver Krämer (Acting Rector 01.11.2019 - 31.08.2020) and Professor Dr Reinhard Schäfertöns (01.09.2020 - 31.03.2023). Professor Dr Dr Benjamin Lang has been the Rector of hmt Rostock since April 2023.

The first accommodation was in a former school at Bussebart and at the Ulmenstraße, which soon revealed to be very small for the increasing number of students. Since its move in 2001 into the beautifully restored Katharinenstift, made by architect Jons Reimann, the University of Music and Theatre has become a noticed venue for concerts, plays and events. Students and lecturers of the University stage over 300 performances every year for the Rostock public.

The actor, painter and writer Armin Mueller-Stahl is since 2009 part of the direction of this University.

== Courses of Studies ==
- Bachelor of Music (Wind instruments, Voice (all specialities), Guitar, Harp, Piano, Composition, Coaching music theatre, Music theory, Orchestral conducting, Pop and world music (instrumental), Pop and world music (vocal), Percussion, Strings)
- Master of Music (Voice, Chamber Music, Composition, Coaching, Music theory (with focus on New Music), Orchestra, Orchestral conducting, Artistic training (Piano, Guitar, Piano Duo))
- Music Education for General Schools
- Pop | World music
- Acting
- Performing Arts

== Alumni ==
- Susanne Bormann (born 1979), actress
- Caspar Frantz (born 1980), pianist
- Claudia Graue (born 1981), actress
- Pauline Knof (born 1980), actress
- Karl Kranzkowski (born 1953), actor
- Liv Migdal (born 1988), violinist
- Stefan Mocker (born 1972), actor
- Anne Moll (born 1966), actress
- Wanda Perdelwitz (born 1984), actress
- Anne Ratte-Polle (born 1974), actress
- Nadja Robiné (born 1980), actress
- Katrin Sass (born 1956), actress
- Daniela Schober (born 1977), actress
- Baiba Skride (born 1981), violinist
- Ines Thomas Almeida (born 1982), singer
- Teresa Weißbach (born 1981), actress
- Jing Xiang (born 1993), actress
