= Leipzig International Mendelssohn Prize =

German award

The Leipzig International Mendelssohn Prize is awarded annually by the Felix Mendelssohn Bartholdy Foundation. The prize carries no monetary award. The award is presented with the Mendelssohn-Festtage Leipzig at the Gewandhaus. A bronze sculpture, given to the recipients, was modeled after the Mendelssohn monument by artist Jo Jastram. Since 2025, the award categories are Music and Europe.

== Recipients ==
- 2007 Kurt Masur
- 2008 Anne-Sophie Mutter and Peter Sloterdijk
- 2009 Riccardo Chailly, Armin Mueller-Stahl and Helmut Schmidt
- 2010 Lang Lang and Iris Berben
- 2011 Peter Schreier and Marcel Reich-Ranicki
- 2012 Thomanerchor and Harald Schmidt
- 2013 Richard von Weizsäcker, Thomas Hampson and Markus Lüpertz
- 2014 Hans-Dietrich Genscher and the Gewandhaus Quartet (Frank-Michael Erben, Conrad Suske, Olaf Hallmann, Jürnjakob Timm)
- 2016 Tomoko Masur
- 2025 Elena Bashkirova and W. Michael Blumenthal
- 2026 Jörg Widmann and Angela Merkel
