= Egon Ledeč =

Czech violinist and composer (1889–1944)

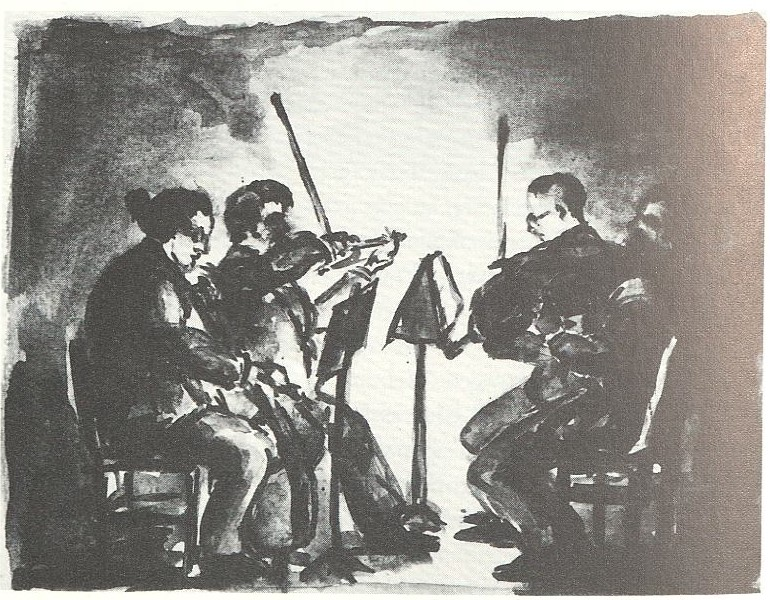
Felix Bloch: Ledeč-Quartett

Egon Ledeč (16 March 1889, Kostelec nad Orlicí – October 1944, Auschwitz) was a Czechoslovak violinist and composer of Jewish origin. Ledeč was one of the artists sent to Theresienstadt and is shown as concertmaster in Karel Ančerl’s orchestra in the Nazi propaganda movie Theresienstadt: A Documentary Film from the Jewish Settlement Area. He was transported to Auschwitz on 16 October 1944 together with Gideon Klein, Viktor Ullmann, Rafael Schächter, and Franz Eugen Klein, apart from Gideon Klein the other four musicians were murdered immediately on arrival. Gideon Klein died in the liquidation of the Fürstengrube camp in January 1945. Egon Ledeč was born on 16 March 1889, in Kostelec nad Orlici, to Samuel and Luisa Ledeč née Stasna.
