= Mareile Krumbholz =

German woman organist

Mareile Krumbholz (born 1982 as Mareile Schmidt) is a German organist and music educator.

== Life and career ==
Krumbholz was a young student at the Robert Schumann Hochschule. After completing her studies of church music, she studied organ, harpsichord and piano pedagogy at the Hochschule für Musik und Tanz Köln and passed all subjects with distinction. She passed the concert exam with Johannes Geffert in 2008.

She has made radio recordings, was a scholarship holder and has won prizes in competitions. Concert tours have taken her to the Gewandhaus, to Minsk and to London. In 2010, she performed the complete organ works of Johann Sebastian Bach at twelve concert dates within four weeks in Hürth.

Krumbholz taught organ improvisation at the Cologne University of Music and the State University of Music and Performing Arts Stuttgart. In the 2010 summer semester, she was appointed to the professorship for organ literature, liturgical organ playing, improvisation and organ methodology at the Hochschule für evangelische Kirchenmusik Bayreuth. At 27 years of age, she was the youngest professor for organ ever to be appointed in Germany.
