= Deutsche Stiftung Musikleben =

German musical institution

The Deutsche Stiftung Musikleben is a foundation whose purpose is the promotion of musical excellence in Germany.

The organisation was founded in 1962 by Hans Sikorski and Wolfgang Essen and is based in Hamburg. The patron of the Foundation is President of Germany. From 1971 to 1984, Eduard Söring headed the Foundation. Since 1992, the Foundation has been headed by Irene Schulte-Hillen.

The foundation has three main focuses in the promotion of young, highly talented musicians:

- The foundation gives historical instruments of the Deutscher Musikinstrumentenfonds on loan to young artists.
- The concert series Foyer of Young Artists provides young musicians with opportunities to perform.
- With prizes, scholarships and sponsorships young artists are individually supported.

The foundation supports activities of the Deutscher Musikrat. Since 1965, its main donors have been the radio stations and, for some years now, the advertising companies of the ARD.
