= Julian Steckel =

German cellist and academic teacher (born 1982)

Julian Steckel (born 1982) is a German cellist and academic teacher.

== Life ==
Steckel was born in 1982 in Pirmasens as the son of piano teacher Vilja Steckel and violin teacher and conductor Helfried Steckel. He completed the Abitur at the old-language Immanuel-Kant-Gymnasium Pirmasens. At the age of five Steckel began studying cello to play with Ulrich Voss in Saarbrücken. Later he studied with Gustav Rivinius in Saarbrücken, Boris Pergamenschikow in Berlin, Heinrich Schiff in Vienna and Antje Weithaas in Berlin. After receiving prizes at the "Jugend musiziert" music competition, he was awarded a prize at the Deutscher Musikwettbewerb of the Deutscher Musikrat in 2003. In 2010 he won the ARD International Music Competition. In 2012, Steckel received the Echo Klassik in the category Nachwuchskünstler (Cello) with his album Korngold, Bloch, Goldschmidt: Cello Concertos, published by Cavi-Music.

From 2011 to 2017 Steckel was professor for cello at the Rostock University of Music and Theatre. Since October 2017 he has been working in the same position at the University of Music and Performing Arts Munich.

== Discography ==
- Primavera: Preisträger Deutscher Musikwettbewerb (with Francesco Piemontesi, piano)
- Spannungen 2005: Wolfgang Amadeus Mozart (with Stefan Dohr, François Leleux, Christian Tetzlaff, Florian Donderer, Priya Mitchell, Hanna Weinmeister, Stefan Fehlandt, Krzysztof Chorzelski, Julian Steckel, Danjulo Ishizaka)
- Spannungen 2005: Johannes Brahms (with Lars Vogt, Isabelle Faust, Christian Tetzlaff, Veronika Eberle, Hanna Weinmeister, Stefan Fehlandt, Julian Steckel, Gustav Rivinius)
- Klughardt Kammermusik (Leipziger Streichquartett; Olga Gollej, piano; Julian Steckel, cello)
- Mendelssohn – Works for Cello & Piano (with Paul Rivinius, piano)
- Korngold- Goldschmidt- Bloch (under Daniel Raiskin)
- French Cello Sonatas (with Paul Rivinius)
- Rachmaninoff & Prokofieff (Paul Rivinius)
- French Cello Sonatas ll (Paul Rivinius)
- CPE Bach Cello Concertos (Stuttgarter Kammerorchester)
