= Veronika Eberle =

German violinist

Veronika Eberle (born 26 December 1988) is a German violinist.

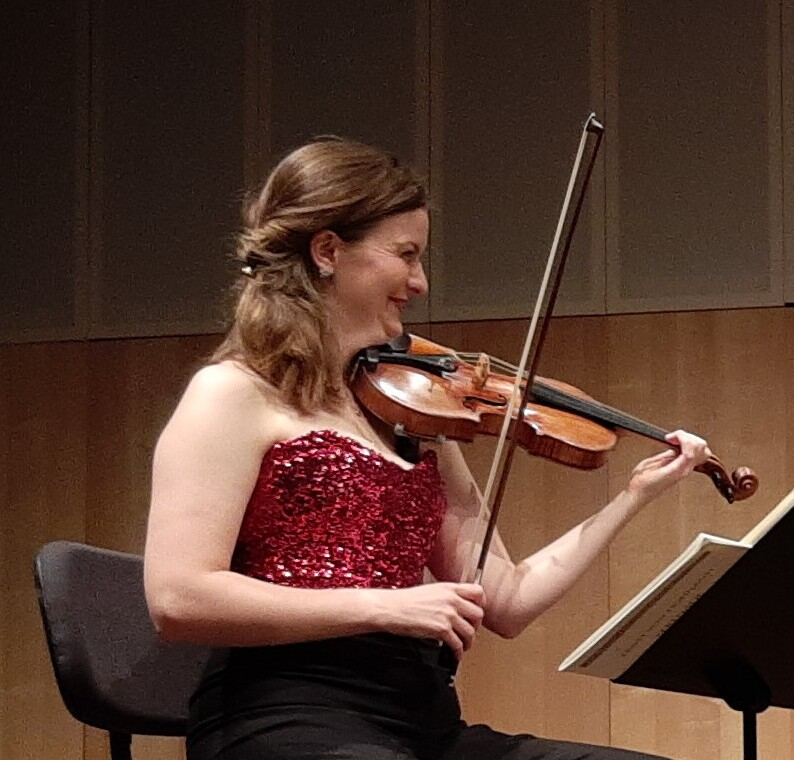
Eberle in 2023

Veronika Eberle has established a reputation as one of the most promising violin talents to emerge from Germany in recent years. Highlights among future concerto appearances include debuts with the Boston Symphony (Beethoven Violin concerto), Los Angeles Philharmonic, Mozarteum Orchestra Salzburg (Mozartwoche), the Academy of St Martin in the Fields, the Scottish Chamber Orchestra, the Musikkollegium Winterthur and the Monte-Carlo Philharmonic, as well as return engagements with the NHK Symphony, Rotterdam Philharmonic, Rundfunk-Sinfonieorchester Stuttgart and NDR Sinfonieorchester Hamburg.

As a recitalist, Veronika Eberle will appear in London (Wigmore Hall), Montreal (Pro Musica Series), Frankfurt (Alte Oper), Bonn (Beethovenhaus), the Mecklenburg-Vorpommern Festspiele, the Lucerne Festival, on tour in Italy and Spain, and over the next three seasons the Konzerthaus Dortmund will feature her as one of its "Junge Wilde" artists. She has just returned from a Summer residency at the Marlboro Festival in the US, which she attended on the personal invitation of Mitsuko Uchida. Her 2008/09 season also included highly successful recital debuts in New York (Carnegie Hall), Paris (Théâtre de la Ville), Salzburg (Mozarteum) and Munich (Herkulessaal).

Veronika Eberle was born in Donauwörth, Southern Germany, where she started violin lessons at the age of six. Four years later she became a junior student at the Richard Strauss Conservatory in Munich, with Olga Voitova. After studying privately with Christoph Poppen for a year, she joined the Hochschule für Musik und Theater München, where she has been studying with Ana Chumachenco since 2001.

Since giving her concerto debut at the age of 10 (Münchener Symphoniker), she has appeared with some of the world's finest orchestras, and her introduction by Simon Rattle to a packed Festpielhaus at the 2006 Salzburg Easter Festival, in a performance of the Beethoven concerto with the Berliner Philharmoniker, spurred her international career. Highlights among her past collaborations include NDR Hamburg, Rundfunksinfonieorchester Berlin, hr-Sinfonieorchester Frankfurt (Paavo Järvi), Frankfurter Opern- und Museumsorchester, Stuttgart Radio Symphony Orchestra, Bamberger Symphoniker (Robin Ticciati), Tonhalle Orchester Zurich (Michael Sanderling), NHK Symphony (Jiri Kout), Prague Symphony, La Fenice Orchestra (Eliahu Inbal), the Rotterdam Philharmonic (Sir Simon Rattle) and Milan's Orchestra Sinfonica Giuseppe Verdi.

She has also appeared at some of Europe's most distinguished festivals, including Menuhin Festival Gstaad, Schleswig-Holstein Musik Festival, Ludwigsburger Schlossfestspiele, Mecklenburg-Vorpommern, Salzburg Osterfestspiele, Beethovenfest in Bonn, Classix Festival Brauschweig, Musikfestspiele Dresden, Dortmund "Next Generation", and Spannungen in Heimbach. She has performed with Lars Vogt, Oliver Schnyder, Christian Tetzlaff, Tatjana Masurenko and Gustav Rivinius.

Her talent has been recognised by a number of prestigious organisations, including the Nippon Foundation, the Borletti-Buitoni Trust (who awarded her a Fellowship in February 2008), the Orpheum Stiftung zur Förderung Junger Solisten (Zurich), the Deutsche Stiftung Musikleben (Hamburg) and the Jürgen-Ponto Stiftung (Frankfurt). She won the first prize at the 2003 Yfrah Neaman International Competition in Mainz, and was awarded Audience Awards by the patrons of the Schleswig-Holstein and Mecklenburg-Vorpommern Festivals.

She is a current member of the BBC Radio 3 New Generation Artists scheme, finishing in 2012.

Veronika Eberle plays on a violin made by the Italian violin maker Antonio Stradivari in 1693, which was made available to her on generous loan by the Reinhold Würth Musikstiftung gGmbH.

== Discography ==
- Beethoven, Ludwig van; London Symphony Orchestra; Eberle, Veronika; Rattle, Simon (2023), Violin Concerto (in undetermined language), London Symphony Orchestra, OCLC 1374672352 (Cadenzas by Jörg Widmann)
