= Tatjana Masurenko =

German violist of Russian descent (born 1965)

- Born: 21 January 1965 (age 60); Dushanbe, Tajikistan
- Genres: Classical
- Occupation(s): Musician, teacher
- Instrument: Viola
- Labels: Sony Classical; EMI Classics; Deutschlandfunk; Capriccio
- Website: tatjanamasurenko.de

Tatjana Masurenko (born 21 January 1965) is a German violist of Russian descent.

== Early life and education ==
Masurenko was born to a Russian family of scientists and jazz musicians. Born in Dushanbe, Tajikistan, she grew up in Saint Petersburg, where she also started her studies which she then continued in Germany with Kim Kashkashian and Nobuko Imai. Encounters with Boris Pergamenschikow, György Kurtág, Brigitte Fassbaender and Herbert Blomstedt have also formed her artistic identity.

== Career ==
Masurenko performs and records as a soloist with orchestras in concert halls all over Europe and Asia. She has appeared with orchestras such as the Gewandhausorchester Leipzig, Rundfunk-Sinfonieorchester Berlin, Deutsche Kammerphilharmonie Bremen, and the NDR Radiophilharmonie. She has also played at Mozart Week Salzburg, Marlboro Festival, Bachfest Leipzig, Rheingau Musik Festival, Schubertiade Schwarzenberg, Musiktage Mondsee, Spannungen in Heimbach, and Istanbul.

Masurenko has won top prizes at the Lionel Tertis International Viola Competition, the Markneukirchen International Viola Competition and the Yuri Bashmet Competition. Her CD recordings British Viola Concertos (Coviello Classics) and of Karl Amadeus Hartmann's viola concerto (Capriccio) were awarded the German Record Critics’ Prize, the Diapason d'Or and a Supersonic Award.

An active chamber musician, Masurenko has collaborated with Heinrich Schiff, Gidon Kremer, Steven Isserlis, Menahem Pressler, Lars Vogt, Isabelle Faust, Christian Tetzlaff, the Vogler Quartet as well as Carolin Widmann, Jörg Widmann and Daniel Hope.

Masurenko has devoted herself to historically informed performance, particularly to the 19th century and Romantic repertoire. Inspired by Jesper Christensen’s ideas, her collaboration with pianist Gilad Katznelson in 2017 resulted in the CD, Just a Motion on the Air. Since 2018, she has also been playing the viola d'amore.

Since 2010, Masurenko has also been performing classical folklore in various programmes with ensembles such as the Volga Virtuoso Quartet (Russian folk instruments) and KOTTOS from Copenhagen.

== Teaching ==
Masurenko was professor of viola at the Felix Mendelssohn Bartholdy University of Music and Theater in Leipzig from 2002 to 2022 and in the same position, teaches at the Haute Ecole de Musique de Lausanne in Sion, Switzerland since 2019. In 2022, she was appointed to the faculty of the Colburn School in Los Angeles. Many of her students have built successful careers and are internationally active as soloists, professors, solo violists in major orchestras and as chamber musicians. Her teaching method is based on the St Petersburg tradition of the 19th and early 20th centuries and merges with the new ideas and perceptions of the 20th and 21st centuries, especially regarding the interpretation of the baroque and classical periods.

Masurenko is the artistic director of the Iznik International Viola Camp in Turkey and the chamber music series "Viola plus" at the University of Music and Theater Leipzig. In 2008, she initiated an annual masterclass for viola in Leipzig, which she also directs.

== Instrument ==
Masurenko plays a viola by Paolo Antonio Testore, made in Milan in 1756, and an instrument specially built for her by Jürgen Manthey (Leipzig 2017), a luthier developing new acoustic and tonal designs. She also plays a viola d’amore by Charles Jacquot, Paris 1849. She uses different bows for different periods of music.

== Premieres ==
Works written for and premiered by Masurenko include the following:

- Nejat Başeğmezler, "Meine kleine Bachmusik" for Viola, Strings and Harpsichord, with the Bratschistenfreunde Chamber Orchestra Leipzig (2015)
- Nejat Başeğmezler, various works for Viola ensembles, premiered by the Leipzig Viola Ensemble, directed by Tatjana Masurenko (2015)
- Dimitri Terzakis, "Sonetto" for Viola and Piano (2012)
- Wolfgang Rihm, "Doppelgesang" for Viola, Clarinet and Orchestra, German premiere with the Gewandhaus Orchestra and Jörg Widmann, directed by Axel Kober (2008)
- Dimitri Terzakis, "Sappho" Cycle for Solo Viola (2007)
- Moritz von Gagern, "Auffädeln" (2007), for Speaker and Viola (with Brigitte Fassbaender)
- Spiros Mouchagier, "Greek Dances" for Viola and Piano (2006)
- Dimitri Terzakis, "Visionen, die Schalen des Zorns betreffend" (2004) for Choir and Viola ad lib. World premiere: January 29, 2005, Leipzig, Thomaskirche, with the Thomanerchor
- Spiros Mouchagier, "Terirem" for Viola and Chamber Orchestra (2005)
- Johannes Dittmar, op. 8 für Viola Solo (2005)
- Dimitri Terzakis, "Hero und Leander" for Viola Solo (2004)
- Dimitri Terzakis, "Solo für Tanja" for Viola Solo (2003)

== Recordings ==
- Dances of Light. Music for Viola and folk instrument quartett by Nikolai Rimsky-Korsakov, Alexander Glazunov, Modest Mussorgsky and Alexander Porfiryevich Borodin. Tatjana Masurenko (Viola), Yaruss Quartett. Hänssler Profil PH23020, 2023
- Just a Motion on the Air. Works for Viola and Piano by Ernst Krenek and Robert Schumann. Tatjana Masurenko (viola), Jens Elvekjær, Gilad Katznelson (piano). Coviello Classics, COV 91619
- White Nights, vol. 1. Viola Music from Saint Petersburg. Works by Dmitri Shostakovich, Mikhail Glinka, Alexander Glazunov, Igor Stravinsky, Nikolai Rimski-Korsakov and Pyotr Tchaikovsky. Tatjana Masurenko (viola), Roglit Ishay (piano). Hänssler PH10029
- White Nights, vol. 2. Viola Music from Saint Petersburg. Works by Sergei Prokofiev, Gennady Banshikov and Dmitri Shostakovich. Tatjana Masurenko (viola), Roglit Ishay (piano). Hänssler PH11070
- Karl Amadeus Hartmann, Concerto for Viola and Piano. Tatjana Masurenko (viola), Frank-Immo Zichner (piano). Rundfunk-Sinfonieorchester Berlin, conductor: Marek Janowski
- British Viola Concertos. William Walton, Concerto for Viola and Orchestra (1962 version, revised 2002); Sally Beamish, Concerto No. 1 for Viola and Orchestra (1995, revised 1998); Benjamin Britten, Lachrymae – Reflections on a song of Dowland, (1976 version for Viola and String Orchestra), Tatjana Masurenko (viola), NDR Radiophilharmonie, conductor: Garry Walker
- Viola lumina. Johann Sebastian Bach, Suite No. 2 in D minor BWV 1008; Igor Stravinsky, Élégie (1944); Henri Vieuxtemps, Capriccio pour alto seule op. 61; Paul Hindemith, Sonata for Viola alone op.31 / 4 (1923)
- Portrait of Tatjana Masurenko with Nina Kogan, piano: Johannes Brahms, Sonata in E flat major for Piano and Viola op. 120 No. 2; George Enescu, Concertstuck pour alto avec accompagnement de piano; Benjamin Britten, Lachrymae – Reflections on a song of Dowland for Viola and Piano op. 48; Darius Milhaud, Quatre Visages pour alto et piano; Paul Hindemith, Sonata op. 25 No. 1
- Dimitri Terzakis, Hero and Leander (2007). Christian Oliviera (narrator), Tatjana Masurenko (viola), Andrès Maupoint (piano)
- Wolfgang Amadeus Mozart, Figaro Suite for String Quartet with Jan Vogler and others (Sony)
