= Oliver Schnyder =

Swiss pianist (born 1973)

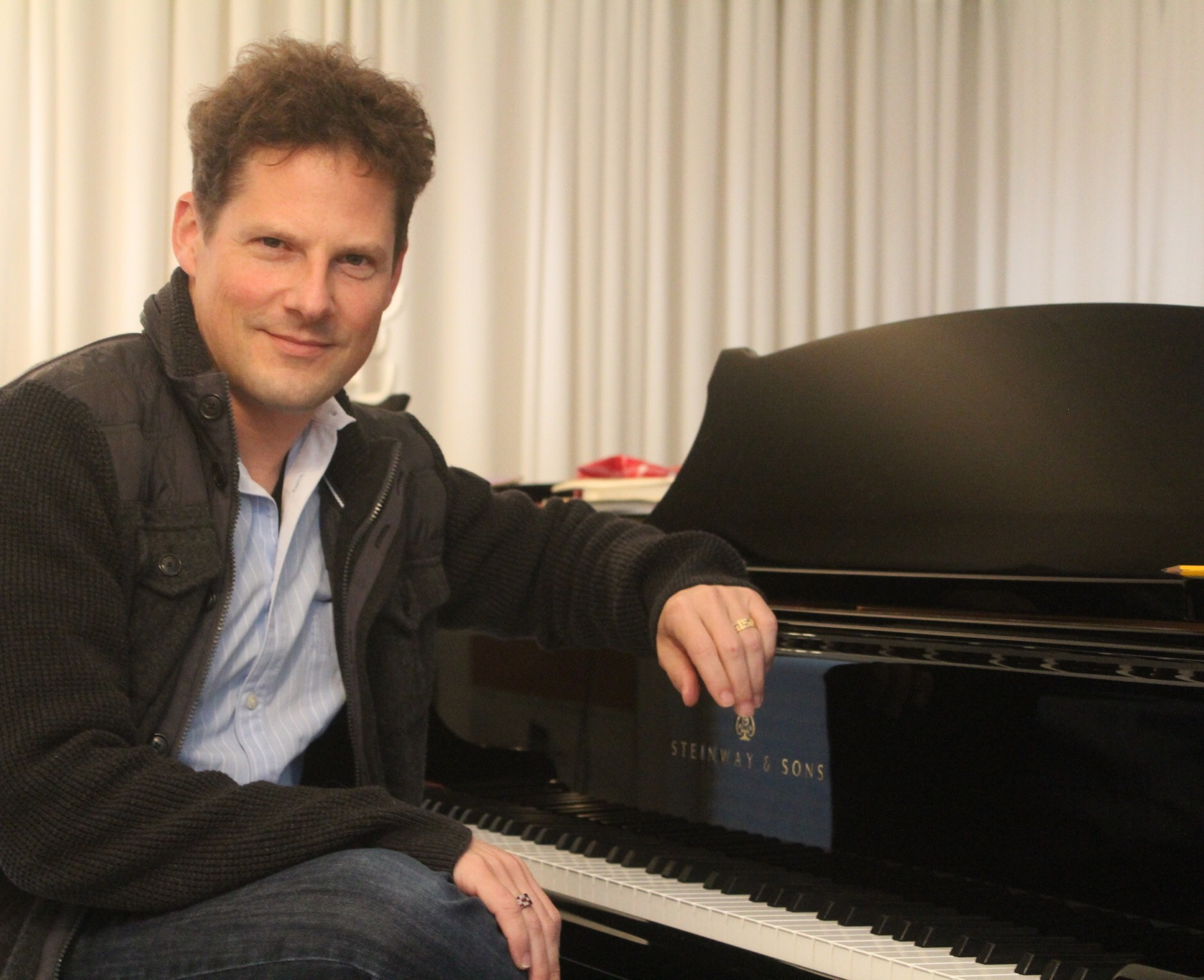

Background information
- Born: 3 October 1973 (age 53); Brugg, Switzerland
- Genre: Classical music
- Instrument: Piano
- Years active: 1998–present
- Labels: Sony Classical; RCA Red Seal (Sony Music/Sony Masterworks); Avie
- Website: www.oliverschnyder.com

Oliver Schnyder (born 3 October 1973) is a Swiss classical pianist.

== Early life and education ==
Oliver Schnyder was born on 3 October 1973 in Brugg, Switzerland. He studied with Emmy Henz-Diémand (taking his teaching and concert diploma of the Swiss Music Pedagogic Association SMPA in 1994), then studied in the master class of Homero Francesch at the Zurich University of the Arts, taking his soloist diploma in 1998. He thereafter studied briefly with Ruth Laredo at the Manhattan School of Music in New York (1998) and from 1998 to 2001 in the class of Leon Fleisher in Baltimore (taking his Graduate Performance Diploma in 2001).

== Career ==
Since his debut recital in the year 2000 at the John F. Kennedy Center for the Performing Arts in Washington, D.C. and his solo debut in 2002 with Tonhalle-Orchester Zürich conducted by David Zinman on the occasion of the Orpheum Music Festival for the Advancement of Young Soloists in Zürich (today: Orpheum – Young Soloists on Stage), Oliver Schnyder has embarked on a global concert career. As a soloist, recitalist and chamber musician he has performed across all of Europe, in North and South America and the Far East, playing in Munich (in the Philharmonie in 2001 and 2003, the Herkulessaal in 2009 and the Prinzregententheater in 2011 and 2013), Osaka (Izumi Hall, 2003), Tokyo (Tokyo Opera City Concert Hall, 2003), Hong Kong (Hong Kong City Hall Concert Hall, 2004), London (Wigmore Hall, 2004, 2010, 2014, 2015), New York (Carnegie Hall, 2005, 2009), Frankfurt am Main (Alte Oper, 2005, 2017, 2019), Milan (Sala Verdi, 2005), Lucerne (Lucerne Culture and Congress Centre, 2005–2019), Moscow (Great Hall of the Moscow Conservatory, 2005, Tchaikovsky Hall, 2011), Beijing (Forbidden City Concert Hall, 2006), Hamburg (Laeiszhalle, 2007), Brussels (Palais des Beaux-Arts, 2008), Manchester (Bridgewater Hall, 2009), Saint Petersburg (Philharmonia, 2009), Dortmund (Konzerthaus, 2010, 2011), Geneva (Victoria Hall, 2010, 2012, 2015, 2019), Taipei (National Concert Hall, 2011, 2015, 2017), Cologne (Kölner Philharmonie, 2012, 2014), Seoul (Seoul Arts Center, 2014, 2018), Rockville, Maryland (Music Center at Strathmore, 2015), Copenhagen (DR Koncerthuset, 2015), London (Cadogan Hall, 2015, 2017), Baltimore (Joseph Meyerhoff Symphony Hall, 2015) and Zürich (Tonhalle and Tonhalle Maag, 1998–2019).

Schnyder has also performed at numerous international festivals, such as at the Ruhr Piano Festival (2000), the Schwetzingen Festival (2007, 2013), the Menuhin Festival Gstaad (2008, 2010, 2017), the Mecklenburg-Vorpommern Festival (2008), the Boswil Music Summer (Festival Artist 2008), the Ernen Music Village (2009, 2014, 2019), the Lugano Festival (2010, 2015), the Lucerne Festival (2010, 2011, 2014), the Frankfurt Musikfest (2017), the Schubertiade Schwarzenberg and Hohenems (2018), the Richard Strauss Festival Garmisch-Partenkirchen (2013) and the Bruckner Festival Linz (Brucknerhaus, 2020).

Oliver Schnyder has performed as a soloist with many renowned orchestras, such as the Philharmonia Orchestra (on a tour conducted by Philippe Jordan, 2012), the Academy of Saint Martin in the Fields (a tour with Julia Fischer in 2015), the Baltimore Symphony Orchestra (2015 under the baton of Mario Venzago), the WDR Symphony Orchestra Cologne (2010, with Semyon Bychkov), the Danish National Symphony Orchestra (2015, with Mario Venzago), the Zurich Chamber Orchestra and the Bern Symphony Orchestra (in the 2014/15 season, Schnyder was the orchestra's first-ever "Artiste étoile", and in this capacity joined them on a tour to England in May 2015; 2018), the Zürich Tonhalle Orchestra (2002, 2013), the Lucerne Symphony Orchestra (2006, 2014, 2017, 2020), the Basel Symphony Orchestra (2002, 2018, UK Tour 2017), the Korean Symphony Orchestra (2018), the National Taiwan Symphony Orchestra (2017), the Wurttemberg Philhamonia Reutlingen (2020), the South-west German Chamber Orchestra Pforzheim (2020), the Belgrade Philharmonic Orchestra (2008, 2011), the Hong Kong Sinfonietta (2004), the Oslo Camerata (2004, 2005), the Israel Sinfonietta (2008) and the Vienna Radio Symphony Orchestra (2018).

Further renowned conductors with whom Schnyder has performed include Howard Griffiths, Muhai Tang, Sir Roger Norrington (Tour with the Zurich Chamber Orchestra in 2016), Michail Jurowski (Korean Symphony Orchestra 2018), Howard Arman, James Gaffigan (Lucerne Symphony Orchestra, complete cycle of the Beethoven Piano Concertos 2017) and Ivor Bolton (Basel Symphony Orchestra 2017, 2018).

Oliver Schnyder is the pianist of the Oliver Schnyder Trio, which he founded in 2012 together with violinist Andreas Janke and cellist Benjamin Nyffenegger. The Trio gave its debut in the Zürich Tonhalle on 4 February 2012 with Schubert's Piano Trio No. 2 in E-flat major. Other chamber music partners include Julia Fischer, Nils Mönkemeyer, Sol Gabetta, Heinz Holliger, Antje Weithaas, Daniel Behle, Benjamin Appl, Regula Mühlemann, Lia Pale, Rachel Harnisch, Veronika Eberle, Marc Bouchkov, Vilde Frang, Alexander Sitkovetsky, Lars Anders Tomter, Jens Peter Maintz, Wolfram Christ, Christian Poltéra, Alina Pogostkina, Henning Kraggerud, Martin Grubinger, the Endellion String Quartet, the Carmina Quartet, the Gringolts Quartet and many more.

Oliver Schnyder's concerts have been broadcast by national public radio stations all over Europe and in the United States.

== Cultural involvement ==
Oliver Schnyder is the founder and artistic director of Piano District (together with cultural manager Thomas Pfiffner), which brings top-class pianists to the "Druckerei" (a former printing plant) in his hometown Baden. Since 2013, pianists such as Radu Lupu, Emanuel Ax, Mikhail Pletnev, Fazıl Say, Kit Armstrong, Yulianna Avdeeva, Angela Hewitt, Stephen Kovacevich, Christian Zacharias, Jan Lisiecki, Dmitry Masleev, Philippe Entremont, Paul Badura-Skoda, Janina Fialkowska and Richard Goode have performed on the stage of Piano District, as well as piano duos such as Tal & Groethuysen, and Anderson & Roe.

Schnyder has been guest artistic director of the Ittingen Whitsun Concerts 2016 (founded by András Schiff and Heinz Holliger), and 2018/2019 artistic director of the Davos Festival – Young Artists in Concert. In 2018, Oliver Schnyder and his wife Fränzi Frick have been appointed artistic directors of the festival Lenzburgiade Classic & Folk International.

== Scholarships, prizes and awards ==
- "Supersonic Award" of the Luxembourgish Magazine Pizzicato, 2015, 2011 and 2010
- "M&T Meilenstein" of the Swiss Magazine Musik & Theater, 2014
- Career grant of the Aargau Kuratorium for artistic achievements, 2012, 2007
- Nomination for ICMA, 2012 (International Classical Music Awards)
- "Choc de Classica" of the French Magazine Classica, 2012
- "Rose of the Week" of the Munich newspaper tz for an outstanding artistic performance, 2009
- Orpheum Foundation for the Advancement of Young Soloists, Zürich, 2002
- Milholland Award for Piano of the Peabody Conservatory, Baltimore, 2001
- Finalist International Robert Schumann Competition for Piano and Singing, Zwickau, 2000
- First Prize at the Pembaur Competition, Bern, 1999
- Rahn Music Award, Zürich, 1998
- Second Prize Lions International Piano Competition, as the official representative of Switzerland at the European Finals in Budapest, 1998
- Scholarship of the Swiss-American Cultural Exchange Council, Washington, D.C., 1998
- Duttweiler Hug Prize, Zürich, 1996
- Landolt Prize, Zürich, 1996
- Soloist Prize of the Jmanuel & Evamaria Schenk Foundation, Zofingen, 1996
- Studies Prize of the Migros-Genossenschafts-Bund and the Ernst Göhner Foundation, 1995
- Soloist Prize of the Swiss Council for Music, Boswil, 1991

Recordings of Oliver Schnyder have been awarded in numerous cases i.e. by the Opernwelt (Winterreisen, 2015), by the Rondo Magazine (Recommendation of the week for the Brahms Piano Trios, 2014), by the Aargauer Zeitung (Best Swiss Classical Album of the year 2014 for the Brahms Trios and Best Swiss Classical Album of the year 2013 for the Schubert Trios), by NDR Kultur (CD of the week for the Mendelssohn Piano Concertos, 2013, and CD of the day for Schumann Piano Works, 2010), by the Kulturspiegel (former supplement of Der Spiegel, classification of the Haydn Piano Concertos as part of the series "The best good Classical CD", 2013), of the Fono Forum (for Liszt Années de pèlerinage, 2012), of ClassicFM (CD of the week for the Haydn Piano Concertos, 2012) and of rbb Kulturradio (CD of the week for the Beethoven Project, Complete Concertos and Overtures, 2017, and the Haydn Piano Concertos, 2012).

== Discography ==
- Bruch: Concerto for two pianos and orchestra op. 88a. Oliver Schnyder, Julia Kociuban (piano). Vienna Radio Symphony Orchestra, Howard Griffiths. Sony Classical, 2019
- Fauré: The Secret Fauré II. Oliver Schnyder (piano), Basel Symphony Orchestra, Ivor Bolton. Sony Classical, 2019
- My favourite Christmas Carrols. Oliver Schnyder Trio & Friends. Daniel Behle (tenor). Sony Classical 2018
- Beethoven: The Beethoven Project. Complete Piano Concertos and Ouvertures. Oliver Schnyder, Lucerne Symphony Orchestra, James Gaffigan. Sony Classical, 2017
- Beethoven: The Piano Trios. Oliver Schnyder Trio. Sony Classical, 2017
- Mein Hamburg. Oliver Schnyder Trio, Daniel Behle (tenor). Berlin Classics (Edel), 2016
- Brahms: Piano Trios No. 1, B major, op. 8 (First and Revised Version), No. 2, C major, op. 87, No. 3, C minor, op. 101. Oliver Schnyder Trio. RCA Red Seal (Sony), 2014
- Schubert: Winterreise(n), D. 911 (Original Version and Version with Piano Trio). Oliver Schnyder Trio. With Daniel Behle (tenor). Sony Classical, 2014 (2 CD)
- Haydn: Piano Concertos F major, Hob. XVIII:3, G major, Hob. XVIII:4 and D major, Hob. XVIII:11. With Academy of Saint Martin in the Fields conducted by Andrew Watkinson. RCA Red Seal (Sony), 2012, and in the series "The best good classical CD" in Kulturspiegel (former supplement of Der Spiegel), 2013
- Schubert: Piano Trios No. 2, E-flat major, D. 929, op. 100 and No. 1, B major, D. 898, op. 99; Der Hirt auf dem Felsen, D. 965, op. 129; Ständchen (from Schwanengesang, D. 957). Oliver Schnyder Trio. RCA Red Seal (Sony), 2013 (2 CD)
- Mendelssohn: Piano Concertos No. 1, G minor, op. 25 and No. 2, D minor, op. 40; Concerto for Piano and Strings, A minor, MWV O 2. With Orchestra Musikkollegium Winterthur conducted by Douglas Boyd. RCA Red Seal (Sony), 2013
- Richard Strauss: Lieder. With Daniel Behle (tenor). Capriccio, 2012
- Generation. Songs of Beethoven, Mendelssohn, Schumann, Brahms. With Renate (mezzo-soprano) and Daniel Behle (tenor). Capriccio, 2012
- Liszt: Années de pèlerinage. Première année: Suisse. Werke, Malédiction, for Piano and Strings, S. 121. With Andreas Janke, Yi-Chen Lin, Cosemin Banica, Cathrin Kudelka (violin), Michel Rouilly, Katja Fuchs (viola), Benjamin Nyffenegger, Christian Proske (violoncello), Kamil Losiewicz (double bass). RCA Red Seal (Sony), 2011 (2 CD)
- Schubert: Piano Trio No. 2, E-flat major, D. 929, op. 100; Piano Sonata, A major, D. 664, op. 120. Trio Opus 100. Solo Musica, 2010
- Mendelssohn: Sonata for Violin and Piano, F major; Concerto for Violin, Piano and String Orchestra, D minor. With Rudens Turku (violin) and Cappella Istropolitana conducted by Ariel Zuckermann. Avie Records, 2010
- Schweizer Lieder. Leo Nadelmann: Mein blaues Klavier; Songs of Bloch, Hegar, Ringger, Burkhard. With Noëmi Nadelmann (soprano). Musiques Suisses (Migros), 2010
- Piano Works. Schumann: Abegg Variations, op. 1; Davidsbündlertänze, op. 6; Aarabesque, op. 18; Ghost Variations, WoO 24; Gesänge der Frühe, op. 133. RCA Red Seal (Sony), 2010
- Homelands. Music for Violin and Piano. Grieg: Sonata No. 3 for Violin and Piano, C minor, op. 45; Rachmaninov: Vocalise, op. 34, No. 14; Dvořák: Sonatina for Violin and Piano, G major, op. 100; Piazzolla: Milonga en Re (tango); Sarasate: Romanza Andaluza, op. 22, No. 1. With Rudens Turku (violin). Avie Records, 2009
- Hefti: Schattenspie(ge)l, Trio for Violin, Violoncello and Piano; Ritus, four Dance Collages for Violoncello solo; Rosenblätter, Song Cycle for medium voice and Piano. Telos, 2008
- Lieder. Songs of Schubert, Beethoven, Grieg, Britten, Trojahn. With Daniel Behle (tenor). Phoenix Edition, 2008
- Contrasts. Mozart: Piano Concertos No. 12, A major, K. 414; No. 13, C major, K. 415 and No. 26, D major, K. 537; the complete Piano works in minor: Fantasias No. 3, D minor, K. 397 and No. 4, C minor, K. 475, Piano Sonatas No. 9, A minor, K. 310 and No. 14, C minor, K. 457; Rondo for Piano No. 3, A minor, K. 511; Adagio, B minor, K. 540. With Camerata Bern conducted by Erich Höbarth. RCA Red Seal (Sony), 2008 (2 CD)
- Hefti: Tenet, four Songs for Sopran and Ensemble; Schattenklang, Adagio for Piano; Mondschatten, for Violin and Marimba; O, star! II, Mosaic for Saxophone solo; Miroirs, for Violin and Piano. With Zürcher Kammerensemble conducted by David Philip Hefti. Telos, 2007
- Recital. Chopin. Telos, 2007
- Grieg: Lieder, op. 48; Hefti: Rosenblätter; Ravel: Histoires Naturelles. With Judith Schmid (mezzo-soprano). SwissPan, 2007
- Hefti: Diarium for Violin solo; O, star! Mosaic for Clarinet solo; Melencolia I for Flute, Drums and Piano; Sator, Concerto for Clarinet and Orchestra. With Stefan Tönz (violin), Valentin Wandeler (clarinet), Zürcher Kammerensemble and members of Collegium Novum Zürich conducted by David Philip Hefti. Telos, 2006
- Saint-Saëns: Piano Concertos No. 2, G minor, op. 22, and No. 5, F major, op. 103; Wedding Cake, op. 76. With Aargau Symphony Orchestra (today: argovia philharmonic, conducted by Douglas Bostock. ClassicO, 2004
- Piano works. Fauré: Nocturne No. 1, E-flat minor, op. 33, No. 1, Impromptus No. 2, F minor, op. 31 and No. 3, A-flat, op. 34; Debussy: Estampes; Mussorgsky: Pictures at an Exhibition. Art Unity, 2002
- Ringger: Aria amarosa (with Copenhagen Philharmonic Orchestra conducted by Okko Kamu), The Golden Heat of Midday (with Orchestra Musikkollegium Winterthur conducted by Heinrich Schiff), "Feuillages" for String Quartet (with Carmina Quartet), Klavierstücke. Musiques Suisses (Migros), 2001
- Piano works. Brahms: Sonata No. 3, F minor, op. 5; Mendelssohn: Variations sérieuses, op. 54; Schubert: Sonata, A major, D. 664, op. 120. Art Unity, 2001
