= Opus Klassik =

German music award

The OPUS KLASSIK is a German music award for personalities and productions in the field of classical music. The OPUS KLASSIK is the successor award to the Echo Klassik (1994–2017). The organizer of the award, which honors outstanding classical artists and recordings, is the newly founded Association for the Promotion of Classical Music e.V., which includes music labels, organizers, publishers, and individuals with influence in classical music. The OPUS KLASSIK is awarded by a specialist jury. The jury selects the award winners and distinguished recordings from a variety of outstanding nominations in various categories. Like the Echo trophy, the trophy for the OPUS KLASSIK was developed and designed by Oliver Renelt. It represents a tuning fork. The music award is presented in a concert and a gala in October at the Konzerthaus Berlin (broadcaster: ZDF).

== Female singer of the year ==
- 2018 Diana Damrau
- 2019 Joyce DiDonato
- 2020 Marlis Petersen, Elīna Garanča
- 2021 Sonya Yoncheva
- 2022 Lea Desandre
- 2023 Asmik Grigorian
- 2024 Anna Prohaska
- 2025 Emily D'Angelo
- 2026 Anna Lucia Richter

== Male singer of the year ==
- 2018 Juan Diego Flórez
- 2019 Christian Gerhaher
- 2020 Daniel Behle
- 2021 Piotr Beczała
- 2022 Jonas Kaufmann
- 2023 Jakub Józef Orliński
- 2024 Konstantin Krimmel
- 2025 Benjamin Bernheim
- 2026 Andrè Schuen

== Conductor of the year ==
- 2018 Cornelius Meister
- 2019 Paavo Järvi
- 2020 Mirga Gražinytė-Tyla
- 2021 Marc Albrecht
- 2022 Vladimir Jurowski
- 2023 Jakub Hrůša
- 2024 Klaus Mäkelä
- 2025 Joana Mallwitz
- 2026 Andris Nelsons

== Instrumentalist of the year ==
- 2018 Frank Bungarten, Albrecht Mayer, Mie Miki, Roman Patkoló, Daniil Trifonov
- 2019 Igor Levit, Sol Gabetta, Andreas Ottensamer
- 2020 Anne-Sophie Mutter, Dorothee Oberlinger, Elisabeth Leonskaja
- 2021 Daniil Trifonov, Augustin Hadelich, Martin Fröst
- 2022 Beatrice Rana, Tianwa Yang, Dominik Wollenweber
- 2023 Víkingur Ólafsson, Anne-Sophie Mutter, Martynas Levickis
- 2024 Lang Lang, Isabelle Faust, Gautier Capuçon
- 2025 Antje Weithaas, Seong-Jin Cho, Lucienne Renaudin Vary
- 2026 Yunchan Lim, Christian Tetzlaff and Sarah Willis

== Composer of the year ==
- 2019 Jörg Widmann
- 2020 Detlev Glanert
- 2021 Olga Neuwirth
- 2022 Pēteris Vasks
- 2023 Konstantia Gourzi
- 2024 Liza Lim
- 2025 Jüri Reinvere
- 2026 Dieter Ammann

== Life's work ==
- 2018 Christa Ludwig
- 2019 Mariss Jansons
- 2020 Rudolf Buchbinder
- 2021 Reri Grist
- 2023 Herbert Blomstedt
- 2024 Gundula Janowitz
- 2025 Arvo Pärt
- 2026 Martha Argerich

== Discography ==
- Best Of Klassik 2018 Die Grosse Gala der Opus Klassik-Preisträger (in undetermined language), Sony Music Entertainment, 2018, OCLC 1281185924
- Lang, Lang; Kaufmann, Jonas; DiDonato, Joyce (2019), Best of Klassik 2019 die große Gala der Opus Klassik-Preisträger (in no linguistic content), Berlin: Deutsche Grammophon GmbH, OCLC 1245680209
- Best of Klassik 2020 die große Gala der Opus Klassik-Preisträger (in no linguistic content), [Hamburg]: Warner Music Group Germany Holding GmbH, 2020, OCLC 1225633763
- Kaufmann, Jonas; Jončeva, Sonja; Lang, Lang (2021), Best of Klassik 2021 – Opus Klassik die große Gala der Opus Klassik-Preisträger (in no linguistic content), Hamburg: Sony Classical, OCLC 1277005077
- Best Of Klassik 2022 Die grosse Gala der Opus Klassik-Preisträger (in undetermined language), Warner Music Group Germany, 2022, OCLC 1350795255
- Best Of Klassik 2023 Die Grosse Gala der der Opus Klassik-Preisträger (in undetermined language), Sony Music Entertainment, 2023, OCLC 1406814433
