= Spannungen =

Chamber music festival, Heimbach, Germany

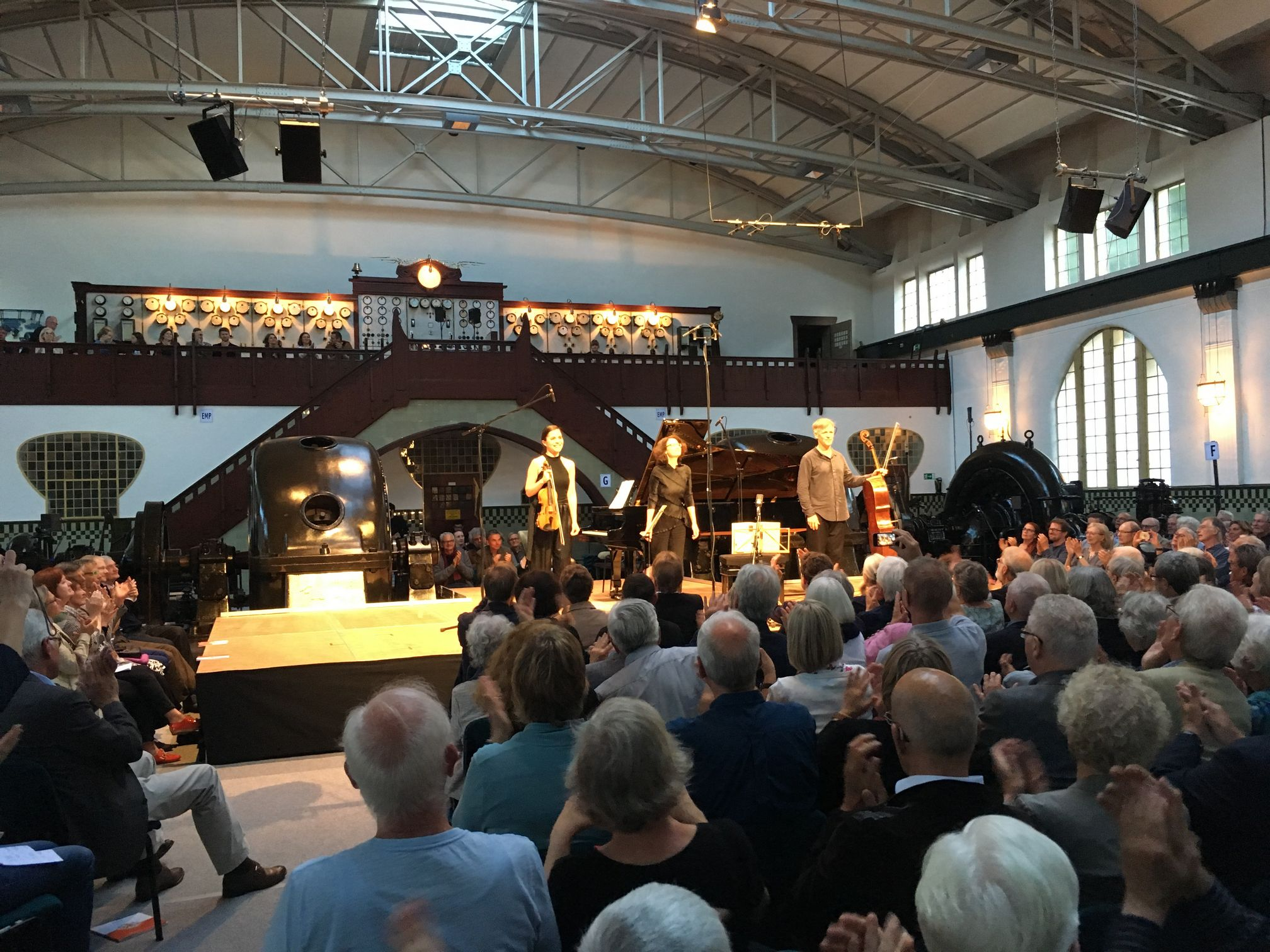
- Concert in the hall of Kraftwerk Heimbach in 2018
- Genre: Chamber music
- Begins: June
- Frequency: annual
- Locations: Heimbach, North Rhine-Westphalia, Germany
- Inaugurated: 1998; 28 years ago
- Founder: Lars Vogt
- Leader: Christian Tetzlaff
- Website: www.spannungen.de

Spannungen ("Tensions" or "Voltages") is an annual summer festival for chamber music in Heimbach, North Rhine-Westphalia, Germany, founded by pianist Lars Vogt in 1998. It is subtitled Musik im Kraftwerk Heimbach (Music in the Heimbach power plant). Performances take place over one week in the power station Kraftwerk Heimbach. Many of the concerts with friends and colleagues were recorded live, broadcast by Deutschlandfunk and recorded for label Avi.

== History ==
Lars Vogt, who appeared internationally as a soloist with renowned orchestras, was a dedicated chamber musician, focused on the repertoire of music from the classical period and the romantic era. He founded the festival Spannungen for chamber music in Heimbach in 1998, to perform annually with friends and colleagues in a historic power plant built in 1905. The festival is held in June for one week. The location, Kraftwerk Heimbach, is a hydro-electric power station in Jugendstil, with old turbines, brass features and Art Deco lamps. The festival is subtitled for its location: Musik im Kraftwerk Heimbach.

Artists of the first festival in 1998 included, besides Vogt, hornist Marie Luise Neunecker, clarinetist Michael Collins, violinists Christian Tetzlaff and Antje Weithaas, violists Tatjana Masurenko and Tabea Zimmermann, cellists Truls Mørk and Boris Pergamenschikow, and pianist Alexei Lubimov.

The festival held world premieres such as Volker David Kirchner's Il Canto della Notte as a commission in the first season, Jörg Widmann's Octet in 2004, and in the 20th season in 2017 Erkki-Sven Tüür's Lichttürme, a piano trio commissioned for the festival.

Many of the concerts were recorded live. Reviewer Jan Brachmann from the FAZ noted that Dvořák's Dumky Trio was played by violinist Christian Tetzlaff, cellist Tanja Tetzlaff and Vogt, as if the players took time for sinking together into moods ("für das gemeinsame Versinken in Stimmungen").

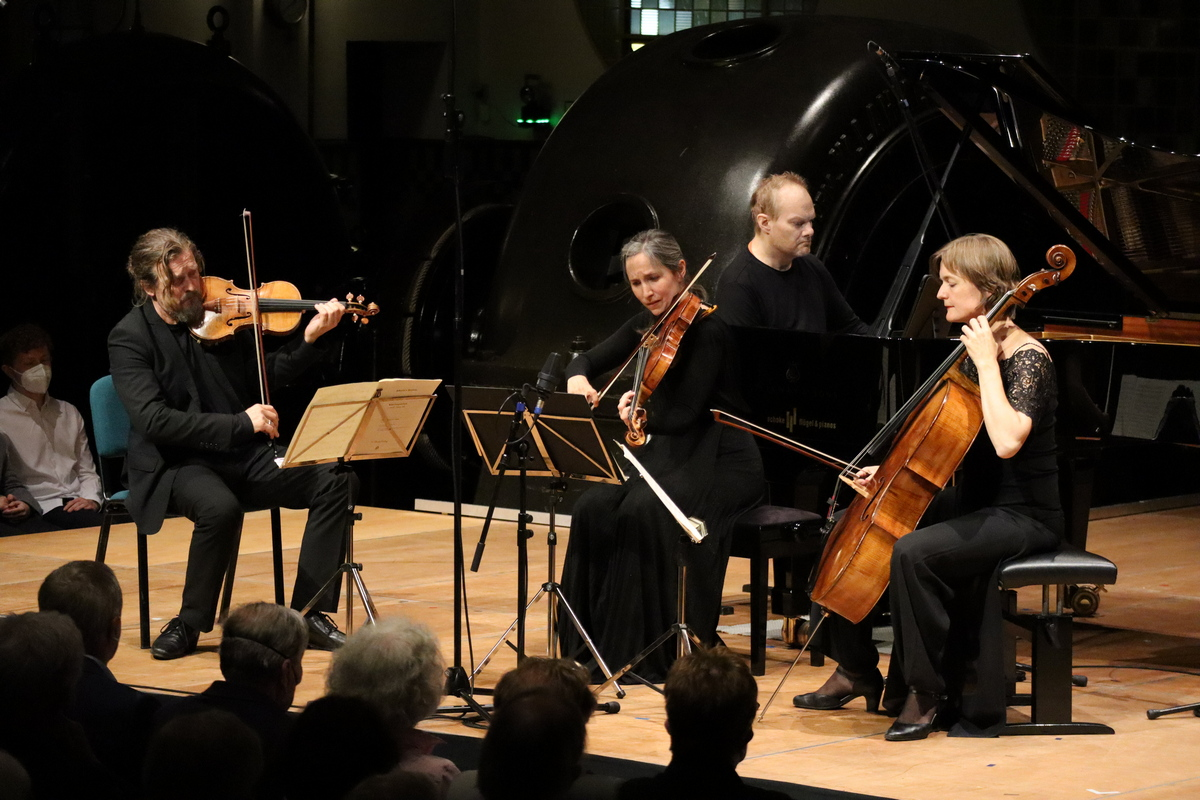
Final concert of Lars Vogt on 26 June 2022

In 2020 and 2021, during the COVID-19 pandemic, the performances were played, broadcast and recorded without an audience. The festival returned to performances with an audience in 2022, with the motto Liebe (love). Vogt gave his last concert at the festival, playing in the final concert on 26 June 2022 with Christian Tetzlaff, Barbara Buntrock and Tanja Tetzlaff the Piano Quartet No. 3 by Johannes Brahms.

Since 25 June 2023, Christian Tetzlaff is the new artistic director of SPANNUNGEN.

== Performances ==
=== Players ===
Among the more than 300 musicians who have performed at Spannungen are:

- flute: Kornelia Brandkamp, Angela Firkins, Andrea Lieberknecht, and Radoslaw Szulc.
- clarinet: Sebastian Manz and Jörg Widmann
- violin: Muriel Cantoreggi, Florian Donderer, Isabelle Faust, Gergana Gergova, Alina Ibragimova, Byol Kang, Isabelle van Keulen, Elizabeth Kufferath, Yura Lee, Wanzhen Li, Alissa Margulis, Anna Reszniak, Christian Tetzlaff, Hanna Weinmeister and Antje Weithaas.
- viola: Volker Jacobsen, Tatjana Masurenko, Diemut Poppen, Timothy Ridout and Rachel Roberts
- viola da gamba: Rainer Zipperling
- cello: Claudio Bohórquez, Alban Gerhardt, Marie-Elisabeth Hecker, Volker Jacobsen, Bartholomew LaFollette, Boris Pergamenschikow, Gustav Rivinius, Tanja Tetzlaff and Quirine Viersen
- harpsichord: Kirill Gerstein
- piano: Anna Rita Hitaj, Aaron Pilsan, Artur Pizarro, Gunilla Süssmann, Lars Vogt and Huw Watkins.

=== Recordings ===
Many recordings were made live at the Spannungen festival by Deutschlandfunk for label Avi (or CAvi):

Year	Title	Musicians
2001	Haydn: Trio in D minor, Hob. XV:23; Schubert: String Quartet, D. 956; Brahms: Piano Trio No. 1 Dvořák: Piano Quartet No. 2	Brandkamp, C. Tetzlaff, Faust, Masurenko, Poppen, T. Tetzlaff, Pergamenschikow, Rivinius, Vogt
2008	Schumann: Piano Quintet; Elgar: Piano Quintet	C. Tetzlaff, Szulc, Masurenko, Rivinius, Weithaas, Bohórquez, Vogt
2009	Bach – Chamber Music: Brandenburg Concerto No. 6 Sonata for viola da gamba and harpsichord in G minor, BWV 1029; Sonata for flute, violin and basso continuo in C minor, BWV 1079; Violin Sonata in F minor, BWV 1018	Firkins, C. Tetzlaff, Cantoreggi, Roberts, Zipperling, T. Tetzlaff, Viersen, Gerstein, Vogt
2010	Dvořák: String Sextet; Schumann: Fantasiestücke, Op. 73; Stücke im Volkston, Op. 110; Aribert Reimann: Solo für Klarinette	Widmann, Lieberknecht, C. Tetzlaff, Donderer, Keulen, Roberts, Rivinius, Viersen, Vogt, a. o.
2011	Tchaikovsky: String Quartet No. 3 Shostakovich Piano Trio No. 2	C. Tetzlaff, Weithaas, Masurenko, T. Tetzlaff, Rivinius, Vogt
2012	Smetana: Piano Trio in G minor, Op. 15; Ravel: Piano Trio in A minor Huw Watkins: Trio for clarinet, viola and piano	Weithaas, Hecker, Watkins; Donderer, T. Tetzlaff, Vogt; Manz, T. Tetzlaff, Watkins
2013	Lili Boulanger: Two pieces for piano trio. D'un soir triste; D'un matin de printemps Debussy: Violin Sonata; Nadia Boulanger: Three pieces for cello and piano Debussy: Scherzo for cello and piano, L 27; Hindemith: String Trio No. 2	Li, T. Tetzlaff, Süssmann; Ibragimova, Vogt; Rivinius, Hitaj; Rivinius, Hitaj; C. Tetzlaff, Jacobsen, LaFollette
2014	Dvořák: Six pieces from Zypressen (nos. 1, 3, 9, 11 & 12), Piano Trio No. 1 Shostakovich: Piano Trio No. 1	C. Tetzlaff, Margulis, Kang, Masurenko, Hecker, Rivinius, T. Tetzlaff, Pilsan, Vogt
2018	Reinhold Glière: String Octet, Op. 5 Reynaldo Hahn: Piano Quintet in F-sharp minor Shostakovich: Two Pieces for String Octet, Op. 11	Kang, Lee, Gergova, Donderer, Weinmeister, Ridout, T. Tetzlaff, Gerhardt; Reszniak, Kufferath, Lee, Rivinius, Pizarro; Kang, Lee, Gergova, Donderer, Weinmeister, Masurenko, T. Tetzlaff, Gerhardt
