= Orchestre de chambre de Paris =

French chamber orchestra

The Orchestre de chambre de Paris (OCP) is a French chamber orchestra based in Paris. The orchestra performs throughout Paris with concerts at the Philharmonie de Paris, where it is a resident ensemble, and also at such venues as the Théâtre des Champs-Élysées, the Théâtre du Châtelet, the Bataclan, and the Opéra Comique.

== History ==
The orchestra was formed in 1978 as the Ensemble orchestral de Paris. Jean-Pierre Wallez was the first music director of the orchestra, from 1978 to 1986. The most recent music director was Lars Vogt, who took up the post in 2020, with an initial contract of 3 years. In December 2021, the orchestra announced an extension of Vogt's contract as music director through June 2025. Vogt held the post until his death on 5 September 2022.

In January 2024, the orchestra announced the appointment of Thomas Hengelbrock as its next music director, effective with the 2024-2025 season.

== Music directors ==
- Jean-Pierre Wallez (1978–1986)
- Armin Jordan (1986–1992)
- Jean-Jacques Kantorow (1994–1998)
- John Nelson (1998–2009)
- Joseph Swensen (2009–2012)
- Thomas Zehetmair (2012–2014)
- Douglas Boyd (2015–2020)
- Lars Vogt (2020–2022)
- Thomas Hengelbrock (designate, effective autumn 2024)
