= Sonnenberg (Eifel) =

Hill in North Rhine-Westphalia Germany

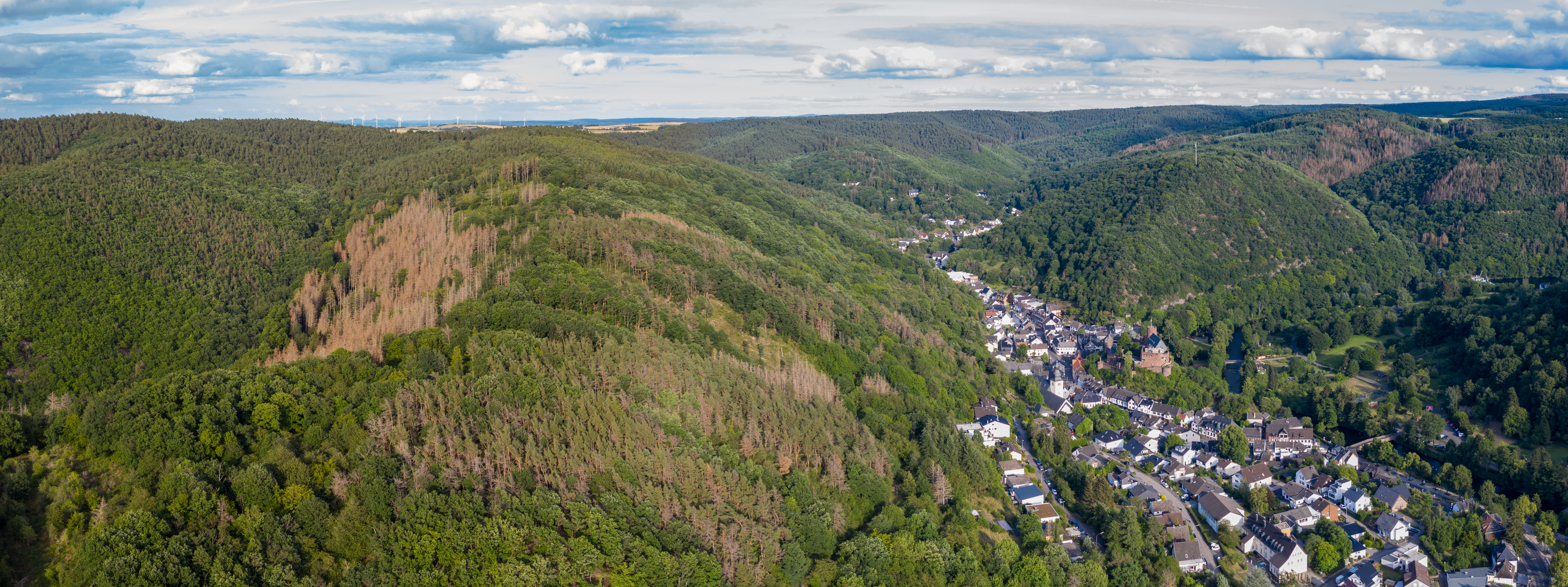

Highest point
- Elevation: 393.3 m above sea level (NHN) (1,290 ft)
- Coordinates: 50°38′28.1″N 6°29′17″E

Geography
- Location within North Rhine-Westphalia
- Location: Near Heimbach; Düren, North Rhine-Westphalia, Germany
- Parent range: Rur Eifel (Eifel)

The Sonnenberg, near Heimbach in the county of Düren in the state of North Rhine-Westphalia, is a hill, 393.3 m above sea level (NHN), in the Rur Eifel, a northern part of the Eifel mountains in Germany.

== Geography ==
=== Location ===
The Sonnenberg rises in the Rur Eifel within the High Fens-Eifel Nature Park and is entirely within the borough of Heimbach. Its summit lies 1,5 km northeast of Hengebach Castle (Heimbach Castle), which is situated in the heart of the town of Heimbach on the River Rur, and 1 km south-southwest of the village church of Hausen, which is further downstream. At the western foot of the hill is the village of Fischbachtal, a small settlement between Heimbach and Hausen, and about 2,5 km (each as the crow flies) east lies the village of Vlatten. To the south the countryside transitions to the Eichelberg (379.1 m) hill near Heimbach. A northern spur of the Sonnenberg, towards Hausen, is called the Rensberg which, on topographical maps somewhat north of its name at almost the same spot gives the heights as 348.4 m and 346.5 m.

The Sonnenberg descends steeply to the Roer; from the summit to the river (ca. 193 m) near Hausen (Rur bridge: 195.9 m) is a height difference of about 200 metres. The hillsides above the Rur are, in places, characterised by prominent slate crags.

The Sonnenberg is partly used for agriculture. In addition, a gas pipeline and a 110-kV pylon runs over it. There are several shrines and altars to the Madonna and Child.

=== Natural regions ===
The Sonnenberg is in the natural region major unit group of the West Eifel/Ardennes (no. 28), in the major unit of the Rur Eifel (282), in the subunit of the Rur-Urft-Olef valleys (282.3) and in the natural region of the Heimbach-Maubacher Rurtal (282.34).

== Protected areas ==
On the Sonnenberg, which is covered by the woods of the Hausener Busch, lie parts of the protected area of Kreis Düren (Teilfläche 1) (CDDA no. 322307; 1988; 307.29 km²). On its lower slopes in the south, west and northwest are separate elements of the nature reserve of Buntsandsteinfelsen im Rurtal zwischen Heimbach und Kreuzau (CDDA no. 318269; designated in 1981; 56 ha).

== Transport and walking ==
The Landesstraße 249 runs along the Rur from Heimbach to Hausen passing the Sonnenberg to the west. South of the hill it crosses the L 218 in Heimbach; the latter runs from Vlatten through Heimbach to Hasenfeld. From these and other roads or in the villages mentioned the hill may be reached on numerous woodland tracks and paths; it is a popular walking area. The E8 European long distance path runs past the Sonnenberg to the south through Heimbach.
