= Lars Vogt =

German pianist and conductor (1970–2022)

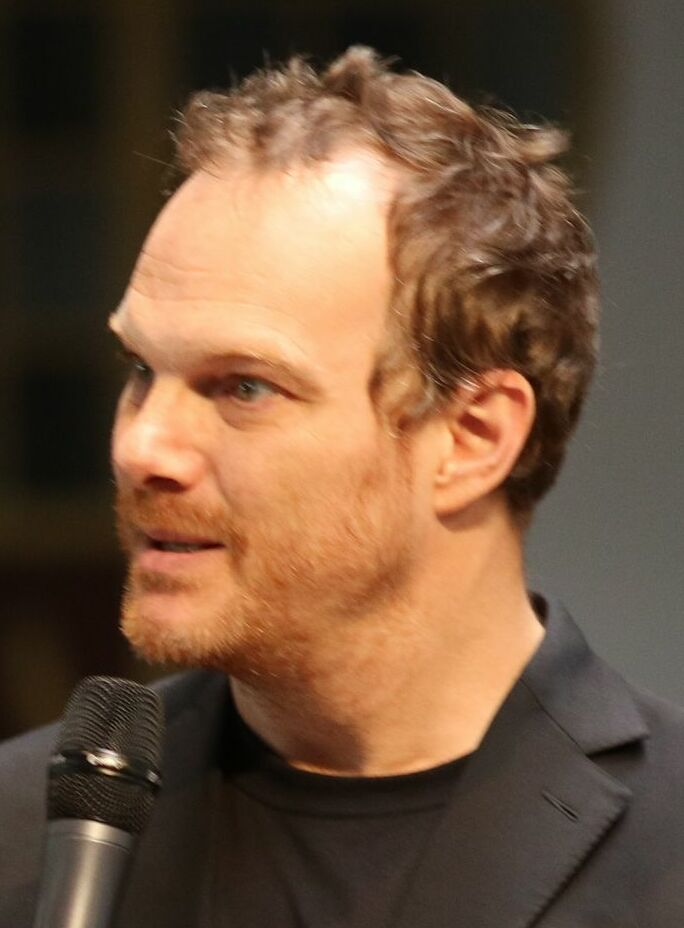
- Vogt in 2018
- Born: 8 September 1970; Düren, North Rhine-Westphalia, West Germany
- Died: 5 September 2022 (aged 51); Erlangen, Bavaria, Germany
- Education: Musikhochschule Hannover
- Occupations: Classical pianist; Conductor; Academic teacher
- Organizations: Berlin Philharmonic; Spannungen; Musikhochschule Hannover Royal Northern Sinfonia; Orchestre de chambre de Paris
- Awards: Leeds International Piano Competition; Brahms-Preis; Opus Klassik

Lars Vogt (8 September 1970 – 5 September 2022) was a German classical pianist, conductor and academic teacher. Noted by The New York Times for his interpretations of Brahms, Vogt performed as a soloist with major orchestras, including the Berlin Philharmonic. He was the music director of the Orchestre de chambre de Paris at the time of his death and also served as the music director of the Royal Northern Sinfonia. He ran a festival of chamber music, Spannungen, from 1998, and succeeded his teacher Karl-Heinz Kämmerling as professor of piano at the Musikhochschule Hannover.

== Life and career ==
Vogt was born in Düren on 8 September 1970 and began taking piano lessons at the age of six. He studied at the Hochschule für Musik und Theater Hannover with Karl-Heinz Kämmerling. He rose to prominence after winning second prize at the 1990 Leeds International Piano Competition and went on to give major concerto and recital performances. His first major recordings were with the City of Birmingham Symphony Orchestra conducted by Simon Rattle, first in 1992 Schumann's Piano Concerto and Grieg's Piano Concerto. On the record cover, pianist and conductor appeared in informal clothes, which was new at the time. They went on to record Beethoven's Piano Concertos Nos. 1 and 2 in 1995. Vogt first played with the Royal Concertgebouw Orchestra, the Vienna Philharmonic, the London Symphony Orchestra, Chicago Symphony Orchestra and Boston Symphony Orchestra. He first appeared with the New York Philharmonic and Lorin Maazel in the 2003/04 season. He had a close relationship with the Berlin Philharmonic who made him their first pianist in residence, again with Rattle. Vogt recorded commercially for such labels as EMI/Warner Classics, Avi Music, and Ondine.

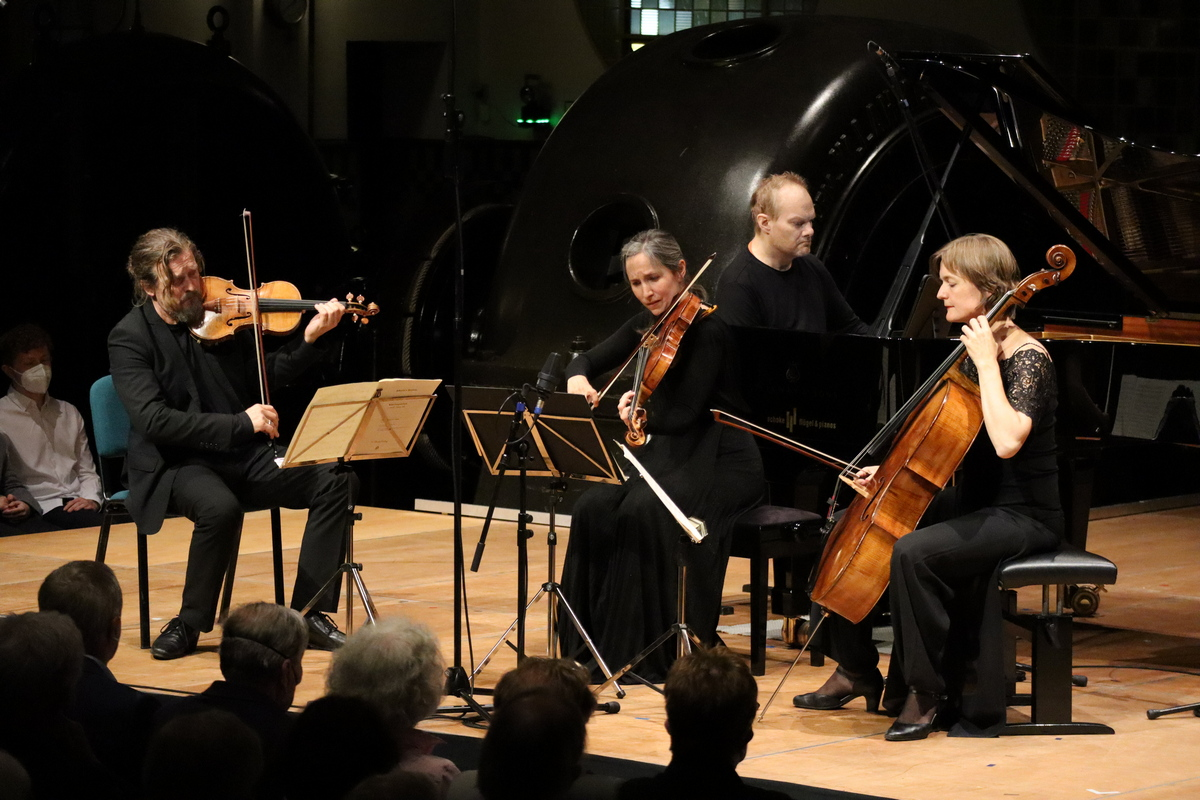
Vogt's last concert, at Spannungen

He was a dedicated chamber musician, focused on the repertoire of music from the classical period and the romantic era. He also collaborated with composers such as Volker David Kirchner, Thomas Larcher, Kryštof Mařatka and Erkki-Sven Tüür. He founded the festival Spannungen for chamber music in Heimbach (Eifel) in the hydro-electric power plant Kraftwerk Heimbach in 1998. Many of the concerts with friends were recorded live. Reviewer Jan Brachmann from the FAZ noted that Dvořák's Dumky Trio was played by violinist Christian Tetzlaff, cellist Tanja Tetzlaff and Vogt, as if the players took time for sinking together into moods ("für das gemeinsame Versinken in Stimmungen"). Vogt gave his last concert there, playing on 26 June 2022 with Christian Tetzlaff, Barbara Buntrock and Tanja Tetzlaff the Piano Quartet No. 3 by Johannes Brahms.

Vogt founded the initiative Rhapsody in School, a network of classical musicians who play in school lessons to provide children a personal close meeting with musicians and their music.

After Kämmerling's death in 2012, he succeeded him as professor of piano at the Musikhochschule Hannover.

=== Conductor ===
In May 2014, the Royal Northern Sinfonia announced the appointment of Vogt as its next music director, his first post as a conductor, effective September 2015. Vogt served as music director until 2020, and had the title of Principal Artistic Partner with the orchestra. In October 2019, the Orchestre de chambre de Paris (OCP) announced the appointment of Vogt as its new music director, effective with the 2020–2021 season, with an initial contract of 3 years. In December 2021, the OCP announced an extension of Vogt's contract through June 2025. He held the OCP post until his death.

=== Private life ===
Vogt was first married to the Russian composer Tatjana Komarova. He lived with his second wife, violinist Anna Reszniak, and one child in Nuremberg, Bavaria. In February 2021, Vogt was diagnosed with cancer of the throat and liver, continuing to play while receiving treatment, and recording between rounds of chemotherapy.

Vogt died in a clinic in Erlangen in the presence of his family on 5 September 2022, three days before his 52nd birthday.

== Legacy ==
In memoriam Lars Vogt

- 25 June 2023 Premiere: Jörg Widmann's ..und wenn wir uns mitten im Leben meinen.., Torso for 2 violins and piano (Antje Weithaas, violin – Christian Tetzlaff, violin – Kiveli Dörken, piano), Kraftwerk Heimbach, Germany.

== Awards ==
In 2004, Vogt was awarded both the Brahms-Preis and the Echo Klassik. He was awarded the Kulturpreis der Sparkassen-Kulturstiftung Rheinland in 2006, and received the Würth Prize of Jeunesses Musicales Germany in 2016. That year, a recording of the Piano Trios by Brahms with Christian Tetzlaff and Tanja Tetzlaff was nominated for a Grammy Award in the category Best Chamber Music/Small Ensemble Performance. Vogt was awarded an Opus Klassik in 2021 and the Pablo Casals Award posthum in 2023.

== Discography ==
Gramophone has regarded several of Vogt's recordings as benchmarks, as solo pianist, chamber musician and soloist and conductor with orchestra. Many recordings were made live at the Spannungen festival by label Avi (of CAvi), marked by the festival's name in the label column.

Title	Instrument	Year	Recorded with	Label
Schumann: Piano Concerto, Grieg: Piano Concerto	Piano	1992	City of Birmingham Symphony Orchestra, Simon Rattle	Warner Classics
Beethoven: Piano Concerto No. 1	Piano	1996	City of Birmingham Symphony Orchestra, Simon Rattle	Warner Classics
Prokofiev: Cello Sonata & Shostakovich: Cello Sonata	Piano	1996	Truls Mørk	Erato
Schubert: Piano Trio No. 1 & Introduction and Variations on "Trockne Blumen"	Piano		Antje Weithaas, Tanja Tetzlaff, Chiara Tonelli, Silke Avenhaus	Avi
Brahms & Berg: Works for Clarinet and Piano	Piano	2003	Sabine Meyer	Warner Classics
Franck, Ravel, Saint-Saëns: Violin Sonatas	Piano	2004	Sarah Chang	Warner Classics
Beethoven: Symphony No. 7 & Triple Concerto	Piano	2006	Gordan Nikolitch, Tim Hugh, London Symphony Orchestra, Bernard Haitink	LSO Live
Schubert: Piano Trio No. 2, D. 929	Piano	2006	Christian Tetzlaff, Tanja Tetzlaff	Avi
Brahms: Chamber Music	Piano	2006	Christian Tetzlaff, Isabelle Faust	Avi
Schubert: Piano Music	Piano	2008	(solo)	Avi
Sharon Kam – Works for Clarinet	Piano	2008	Sharon Kam, Antje Weithaas, Gustav Rivinius	Avi
Schumann: Piano Quintet & Elgar: Piano Quintet	Piano	2008		Avi (Spannungen)
Mozart: Piano Concertos Nos. 20 & 23	Piano	2009	Mozarteum Orchester, Ivor Bolton	Oehms
Bach – Chamber Music	Piano	2009		Avi (Spannungen)
Dvořák, Schumann & Reimann: Chamber Works	Piano	2010		Avi (Spannungen)
Liszt: Piano Sonata in B Minor, Schumann: Fantasie in C	Piano	2010	(solo)	Berlin Classics
Brahms: Viola Sonatas, Op. 120	Piano	2011	Rachel Roberts	Avi
Tchaikovsky: String Quartet No. 3 & Shostakovich Piano Trio No. 2	Piano	2011		Avi (Spannungen)
Smetana, Ravel and Watkins: Piano Trios	Piano	2012		Avi (Spannungen)
Mozart: Violin Sonatas	Piano	2012	Christian Tetzlaff	Ondine
Schumann: Violin Sonatas	Piano	2013	Christian Tetzlaff	Ondine
Mozart: Piano Concertos Nos. 21 & 27	Piano	2013	Frankfurt Radio Symphony Orchestra, Paavo Järvi	Avi
Nadia Boulanger, Nadia Boulanger, Hindemith & Debussy: Chamber Works	Piano	2013		Avi (Spannungen)
Dvořák & Shostakovich: Piano Trios	Piano	2014		Avi (Spannungen)
Chopin	Piano	2014	(solo)	Avi
Brahms: Piano Trios Nos. 1–3	Piano	2015	Christian Tetzlaff, Tanja Tetzlaff	Ondine
Bach: Goldberg Variations	Piano	2015	(solo)	Ondine
Schubert, Britten & Shostakovich: Works for Viola and Piano	Piano	2016	Rachel Roberts	Avi
Mozart & Mendelssohn: Concertos for Piano	Conductor	2016	Danae Dorken, Royal Northern Sinfonia	ARS
For children: Thomas Larcher's 12 Stücke für Kinder "Poems", excerpts from Schumann's Album für die Jugend and Bartok's For Children	Piano	2016	(solo)	Avi
Brahms: Violin Sonatas	Piano	2016	Christian Tetzlaff	Ondine
Schubert	Piano	2016	(solo)	Ondine
Beethoven: Piano Concertos 1 & 5	Piano, Conductor	2017	Royal Northern Sinfonia	Ondine
Beethoven: Triple Concerto, Piano Concerto No. 3	Piano, Conductor	2017	Christian Tetzlaff, Tanja Tetzlaff, Royal Northern Sinfonia	Ondine
Beethoven: Piano Concertos Nos. 2 & 4	Piano, Conductor	2018	Royal Northern Sinfonia	Ondine
Schumann: Cello Concerto & works for cello and piano	Piano	2018	Gabriel Schwabe, Northern Sinfonia	Naxos
Dvořák: Piano Trios Nos. 3 & 4	Piano	2018	Christian Tetzlaff, Tanja Tetzlaff	Ondine
Mozart: Piano Sonatas K. 280, K. 281, K. 310, K. 333	Piano	2019	(solo)	Ondine
Brahms: Piano Concerto No. 1 & Four Ballades	Piano, Conductor	2019	Royal Northern Sinfonia	Ondine
Brahms: Piano Concerto No. 2 & Handel Variations	Piano, Conductor	2020	Royal Northern Sinfonia	Ondine
Janáček: On an Overgrown Path, In the Mists, Sonata 1. X. 1905	Piano	2021	(solo)	Ondine
Beethoven: Violin Sonatas, Op. 30	Piano	2021	Christian Tetzlaff	Ondine
Schumann & Strauss: Melodramas	Piano	2022	Isabelle Vogt (narrator)	Ondine
Mendelssohn: Piano Concertos & Capriccio Brillant	Piano, Conductor	2022	Orchestre de Chambre de Paris	Ondine
Schubert: Schwanengesang	Piano	2022	Ian Bostridge	Pentatone
Schubert: Piano Trios, Notturno, Rondo, Arpeggione Sonata	Piano	2023	Christian Tetzlaff, Tanja Tetzlaff	Ondine
Brahms: Piano Quartets	Piano	2024	Christian Tetzlaff, Tanja Tetzlaff, Barbara Buntrock	Ondine

Cultural offices
Preceded by Thomas Zehetmair	Music Director, Royal Northern Sinfonia; 2015–2020	Succeeded by Dinis Sousa (principal conductor)
Preceded by Douglas Boyd	Music Director, Orchestre de chambre de Paris; 2020–2022	Succeeded by Thomas Hengelbrock
