= Daniel Behle =

German opera singer

- Born: 1974 (age 51–52); Hamburg, Germany
- Education: Hochschule für Musik und Theater Hamburg
- Occupations: Operatic tenor; Trombonist; Composer
- Awards: Bundeswettbewerb Gesang; Queen Sonja International Music Competition

Daniel Behle (born 1974) is a German classical composer and operatic tenor. He has performed at international opera houses and festivals, and has recorded both operas and Lieder recitals.

== Career ==
Born in Hamburg in 1974, Behle studied music pedagogy, trombone and composition at the music school in his home town. He took voice lessons from age 22 with his mother, the dramatic soprano Renate Behle. After graduating in trombone playing, he studied voice for five years with tenor James Wagner. In 2003, Behle changed to the class of his mother. He completed both his composition studies with Peter Michael Hamel and the voice studies with distinction.

His first operatic engagement was at the Oldenburgisches Staatstheater. With the 2005/06 season, he turned to the Vienna Volksoper. From the 2007/08 season, he was for two years a member of the Frankfurt Opera, but has returned, for example to appear as Erik in Wagner's Der fliegende Holländer, his first Wagner role.

Behle performed Lieder recitals with pianists Sveinung Bjelland and Oliver Schnyder at major European festivals. He made his debut at the Bayreuth Festival in 2017 as David in Barrie Kosky's new production of Wagner's Die Meistersinger von Nürnberg. A reviewer noted that he performed the role of the apprentice on the master level ("auf Meisterniveau").

Behle sang at major opera houses including the Berlin State Opera, the Bavarian State Opera in Munich, La Monnaie in Brussels, the Zurich Opera, the Grand Théâtre de Genève, the Hamburg State Opera, the Vienna State Opera, the Royal Swedish Opera, and the Paris Opera. He made his debut at the Royal Opera House in London as Ferrando in Mozart's Così fan tutte in the 2016/17 season. He performed Mozart arias with the chamber orchestra of the Bayerischer Rundfunk and Schubert's Winterreise in the orchestra version by Hans Zender. He performed his version of Schubert's Winterreise for voice and piano trio at Wigmore Hall in 2015.

Behle sang as a guest with orchestras such as the Gürzenich Orchestra, WDR Rundfunkorchester Köln, Concertgebouw Orchestra, and Beethoven Orchester Bonn, and at festivals including the Kissinger Sommer, with the Capella Augustina in Brühl (Rhineland) and with the Internationale Bachakademie Stuttgart. He worked with conductors such as Frans Brüggen, James Gaffigan, Andreas Spering, Christoph Spering, Markus Stenz, Jeffrey Tate and Sebastian Weigle.

In concert, he was the Evangelist in Bach's Christmas Oratorio with the NDR Elbphilharmonie Orchestra conducted by Thomas Hengelbrock in 2016. He appeared as Loge in concert performances of Wagner's Das Rheingold, at both the Elbphilharmonie and the Baden-Baden Festival. He sang the tenor solo in Mendelssohn's Lobgesang conducted by Pablo Heras-Casado at St. Cecilia, Rome. He was the Evangelist in Bach's St John Passion with the Vienna Symphony, conducted by Philippe Jordan, and the tenor in Haydn's Die Jahreszeiten with the Leipzig Gewandhaus Orchestra conducted by Trevor Pinnock. In December 2017, he was the tenor soloist in Beethoven's Missa solemnis with the Berlin Philharmonic, conducted by Christian Thielemann.

On 25 August 2018, he saved a concert of the Rheingau Musik Festival with Annette Dasch at the Kurhaus Wiesbaden with rarely performed duets by Schubert, Schumann and Brahms, stepping in at short notice and having a single day to learn mostly new repertoire, in a concert recorded for broadcast. A reviewer noted his nuanced and articulated rendition with a focus on the text, the dramatic vitality in scenes by Schumann, and the harmony with the soprano as the essence of Lieder singing.

== Recordings ==
Behle's first CD, with songs by Franz Schubert, Ludwig van Beethoven, Edvard Grieg, Benjamin Britten and Manfred Trojahn, was cited as one of the best 15 new recordings by the Metropolitan Opera in 2009.

Several of his recordings are held by the German National Library, including:

- Goldmark: Merlin (Profi Medien, 2009)
- Mozart: Die Zauberflöte (harmonia mundi, 2010)
- Schumann: Dichterliebe (Capriccio, 2011)
- Strauss: Lieder (Capriccio, 2012)
- Generation (Capriccio, 2012)
- Vinci: Artaserse (EMI, 2012)
- Humperdinck: Königskinder (Oehms Classics, 2012)
- Bach (Sony, 2013)
- Schumann: Der Rose Pilgerfahrt (Oehms Classics, 2013)
- Brahms: Die schöne Magelone (Capriccio, 2014)
- Telemann: Brockes-Passion (harmonia mundi, 2014)
- Gluck Arias (Decca, 2014)
- Strauss: Arabella (C Major, 2014)
- Behle: "Gluck Opera Arias"
- Winterreisen - version with piano trio and original (Sony Classical, 2015)
- Mein Hamburg (Berlin Classics, 2016)
- Schubert Arias (Deutsche Harmonia Mundi, 2017)
- Wagner: Die Meistersinger von Nürnberg (Deutsche Grammophon, 2018)

== Compositions ==
- Albern Werk for brass quintet (1994)
- "7" for tenor trombone (1999)
- Dämmerung for eight trombones (2000)
- Drei kleine Charakterstücke for three trombones (2001)
- Ein Tubaquartett (2002)
- Tubaquartett '07 (2007)
- Der Flug des Reihers (The heron's flight), song cycle (2008)
- Wiesn for brass quintet (2009), revised to Klabautermann (2015)
- Winterreise in Trio (2013)
- Ringelnatzzyklus, after five poems (2013)

== Awards ==
- Bundeswettbewerb Gesang
- Robert Stolz singing competition, Hamburg
- Queen Sonja International Music Competition (2005)
- Troldhaugen Grieg Prize
