= Capriccio Brillant (Mendelssohn) =

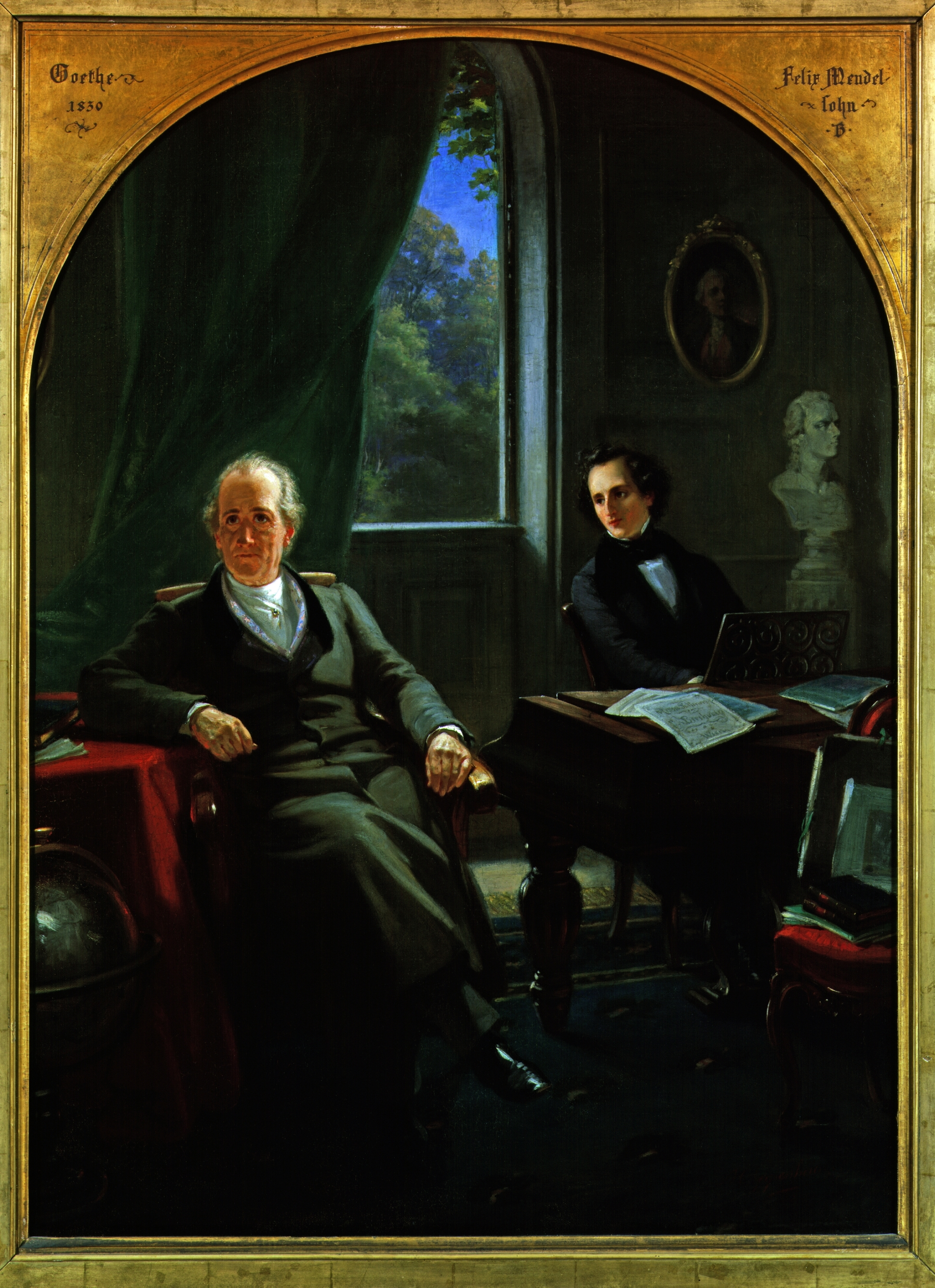
Reconstruction of Mendelssohn (right) in 1830

Capriccio Brillant, op. 22 is an 1832 composition by Felix Mendelssohn.

Capriccio Brillant
Played by Joanna Graudan
