= Kraftwerk Heimbach =

German hydro-electric power station

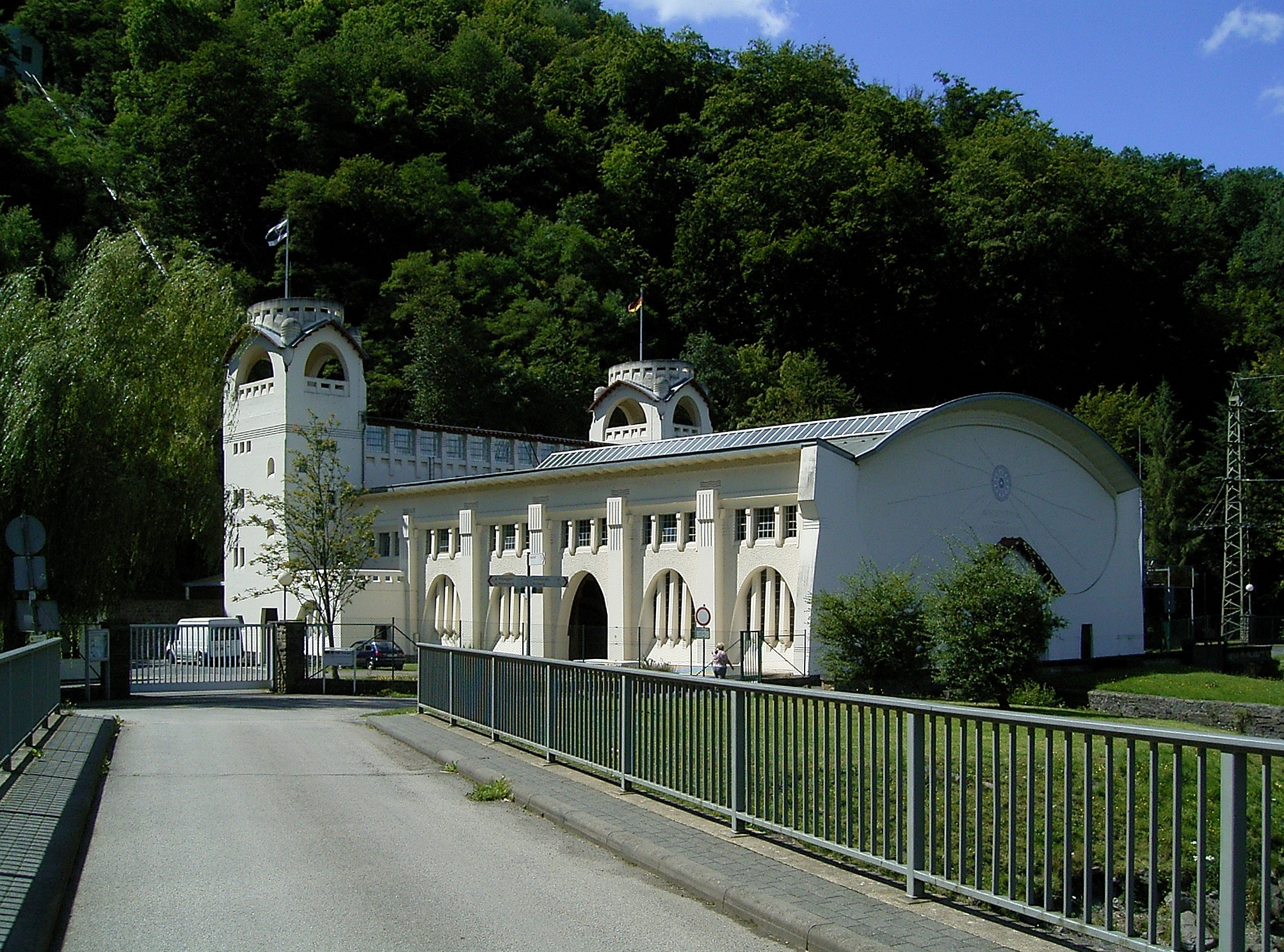
- Interactive map of Kraftwerk Heimbach
- Country: Germany
- Location: Heimbach
- Coordinates: 50.6286°N 6.4519°E
- Owner: RWE Generation

Reservoir
- Creates: Urft reservoir

Power Station
- Commission date: 1905
- Turbines: 2 Francis turbines

Kraftwerk Heimbach is a hydro-electric power station in Heimbach, North Rhine-Westphalia, Germany. It was built in Jugendstil architecture, completed in 1905, then the largest hydro-electric power station in Europe. It is also known as Urftkraftwerk, because it uses water from the Urft reservoir. The original eight Francis turbines served until 1974, when they were replaced by two more powerful turbines, leaving two in place for historic value. The power station is still operating to cover peak demand, run by RWE.

In 1998, the Spannungen festival of chamber music has been held in the turbine hall for one week in June. The turbines are stopped during the concerts. The upper floor of the power station houses a museum for historic electric appliances.

== History ==
Kraftwerk Heimbach is located in the High Fens – Eifel Nature Park, on the south bank of the Roer near the Rur reservoir. It takes its water from the Urft reservoir, 110 metres (360 ft) higher. When it was built, it was the largest hydro-electric power station in Europe.

In 1895, Otto Intze, a leading expert of water building in Germany, was commissioned by the government of the Rhenish Provinces to look into the area of Urft and Rur, because it was subject to drought in summer and flooding in winter. He arrived at the conclusion that the building of dams should be combined with power stations to make the effort economical. The building of the dams was begun in 1899. The reservoirs were filled by March 1905.

The main hall was designed by Georg Frentzen from Aachen in Jugendstil architecture. It had eight Francis turbines, each serving a generator of 1.5 MW. The power station was opened on 8 May 1905. It served Aachen, parts of Cologne, and the Eifel region.

In 1974, the original turbines were taken out of service. Two of them were kept as a historic monument, while others were moved to different locations such as Staustufe Fankel, in the Kraftwerk Weisweiler and in Brauweiler, for historic demonstration. In Heimbach, they were replaced by two more efficient turbines, that served from 1975. The facility was restored in 1990 and 1991.

The power station is still in operation, run by RWE Generation. It has an installed capacity of 16 MW, used mainly to cover peak demand, usually during morning hours on weekdays.

== Culture ==
Since 1998 the power station has been the venue for the annual Spannungen chamber music festival, founded by Lars Vogt. During concerts, the turbines are stopped.

The upper floor of the power station is the RWE Industriemuseum, a museum showing historic electric appliances and other related features.

== Gallery ==
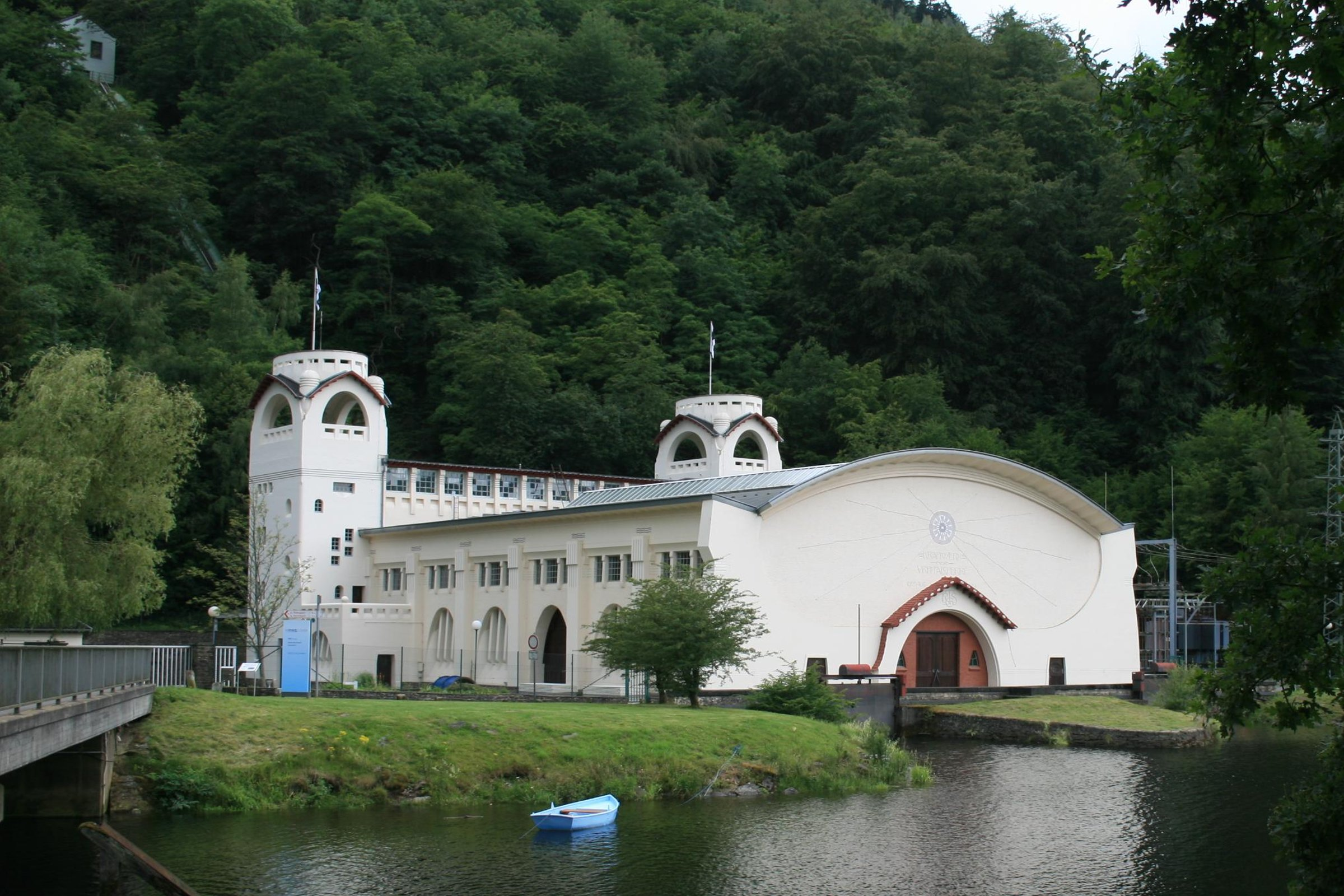
Exterior

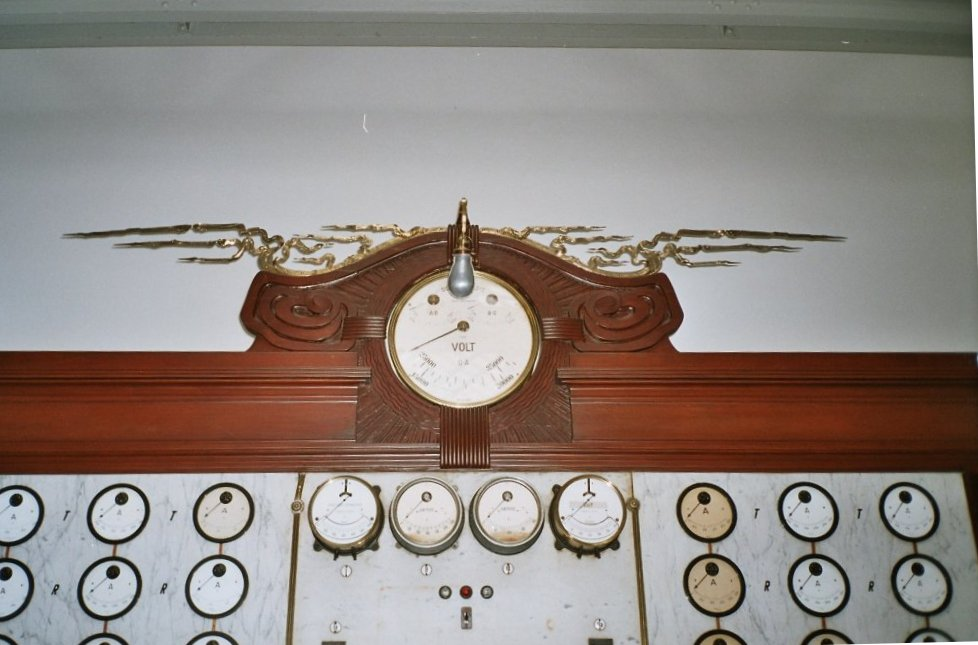
Marble control panel

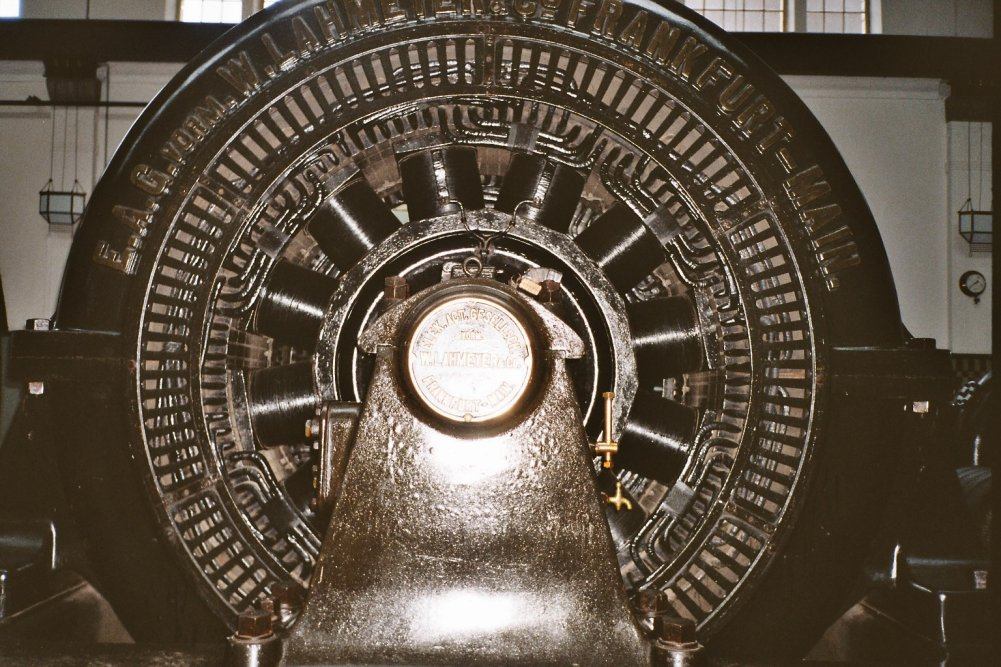
Generator

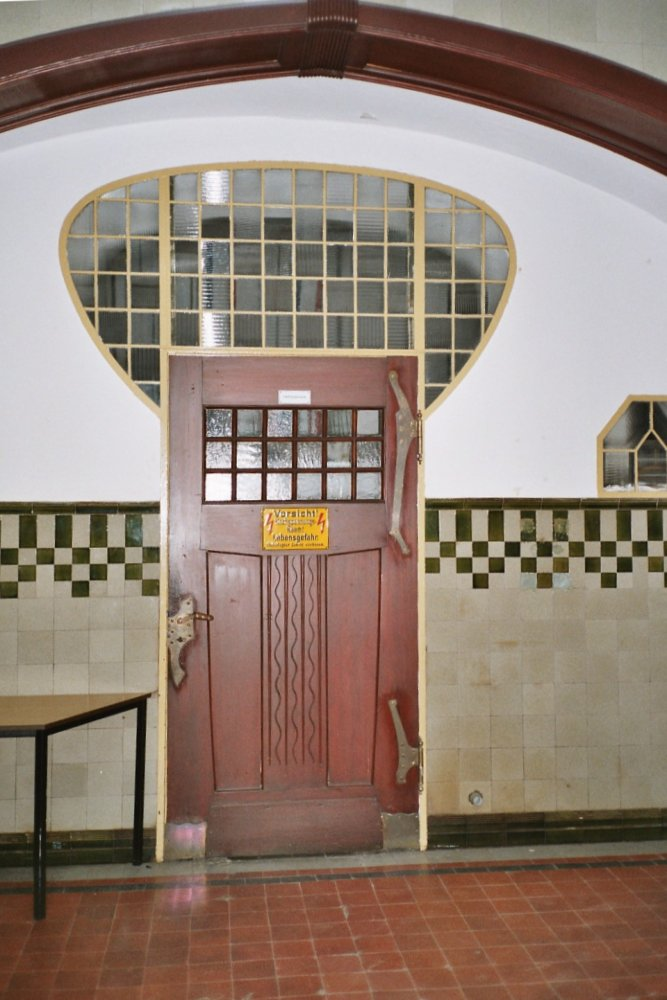
light bulb–shaped door

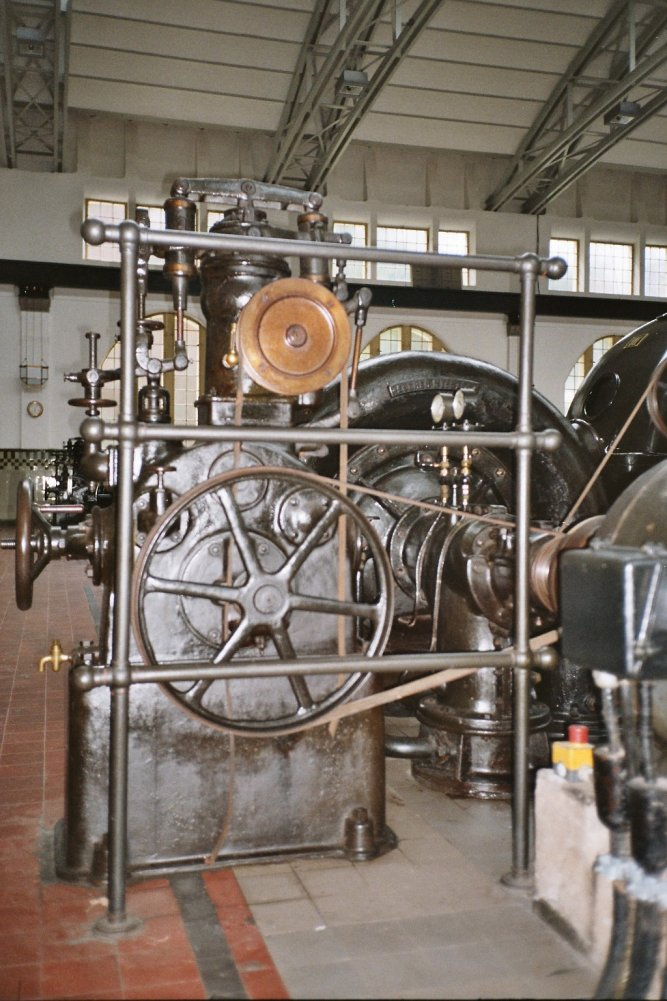
Regulator

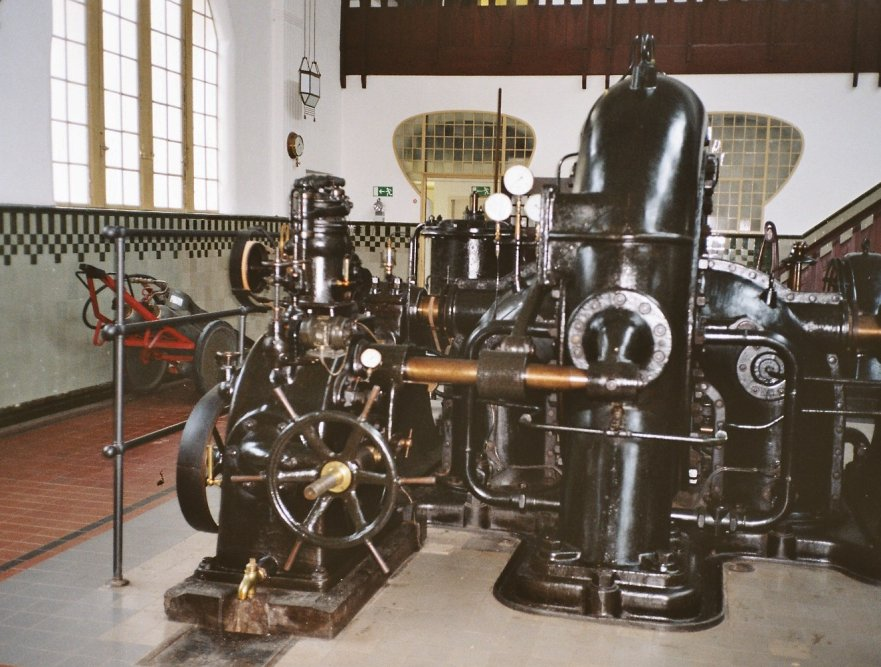
Francis turbine

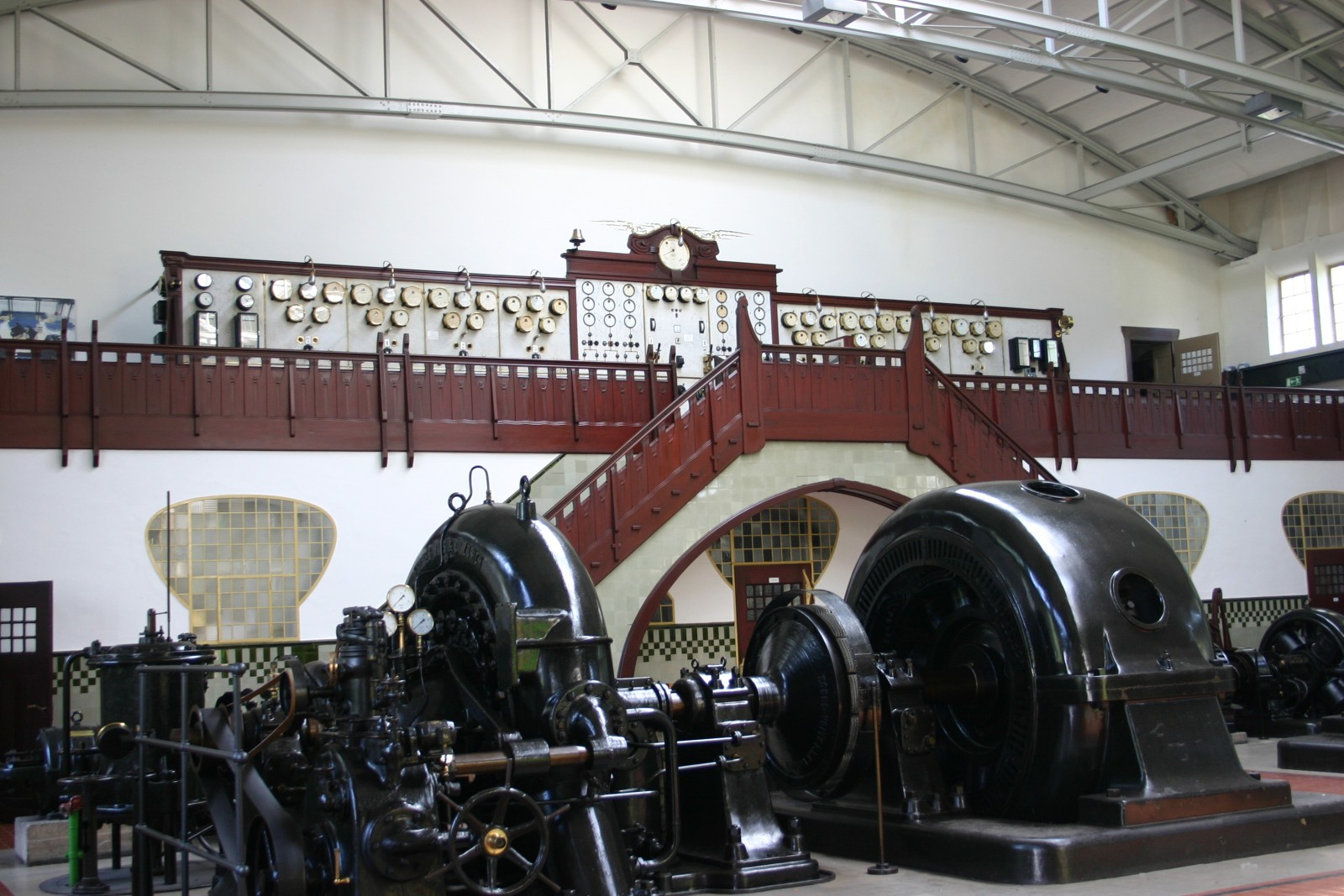
Turbine hall
