= Christian Tetzlaff =

German violinist (born 1966)

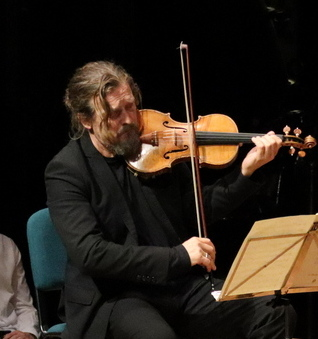
- Tetzlaff playing chamber music in 2022
- Born: 29 April 1966 (age 60); Hamburg, Germany
- Occupation: Classical violinist

Christian Tetzlaff (born 29 April 1966) is a German violinist who has performed internationally, with a focus on chamber music.

== Biography ==
Tetzlaff was born in Hamburg. His parents were amateur musicians and met in a church choir. He began playing the violin and piano at the age of 6, and made his concert debut at 14 years old. He studied with Uwe-Martin Haiberg at the Musikhochschule Lübeck and later with Walter Levin at the University of Cincinnati's College-Conservatory of Music.

His breakthrough as a soloist came in 1988, at the age of 22, when he performed Schoenberg's Violin Concerto in critically acclaimed concerts with the Cleveland Orchestra and the Munich Philharmonic. The following year he made his solo recital debut in New York City. He has continued to play as a soloist with major orchestras on stage and in recordings, including Beethoven's works for violin and orchestra performed with the Tonhalle Orchester Zürich under David Zinman. He returned to New York in 2011 for a recital with Antje Weithaas at Zankel Hall. 2012 he joined his sister Tanja (cello) and Leif Ove Andsnes (piano) playing Schumann's piano trios, which were awarded. Other critically acclaimed recordings include his 2007 release of Bach's sonatas and partitas for solo violin, and in 2012 his release of three Mozart violin sonatas with Lars Vogt at the Spannungen chamber music festival in Heimbach. His recording of Schumann's violin sonatas with Lars Vogt (piano) was named Gramophone's recording of the month for January 2014. His discography includes a number of modern works such as the violin concertos of György Ligeti and Stuart MacRae.

In 2011 he signed a long-term recording contract with Ondine.

He was the Artist in Residence of the Dresden Philharmonic in the 2018/2019 season and of the Seoul Philharmonic Orchestra in the year 2019.

On March 1, 2025, Tetzlaff "abruptly canceled a spring tour of the US with his string quartet. The announcement was made following news of the White House meeting between US President Donald Trump and Ukrainian President Volodymyr Zelenskyy on Friday 28 February. Citing concerns over Trump's policies — particularly his stance on Russia — Tetzlaff remarked in an interview with The New York Times: 'There seems to be a quietness or denial about what’s going on. I feel utter anger ... I cannot just go and play a tour of beautiful concerts.'"

== Playing style ==
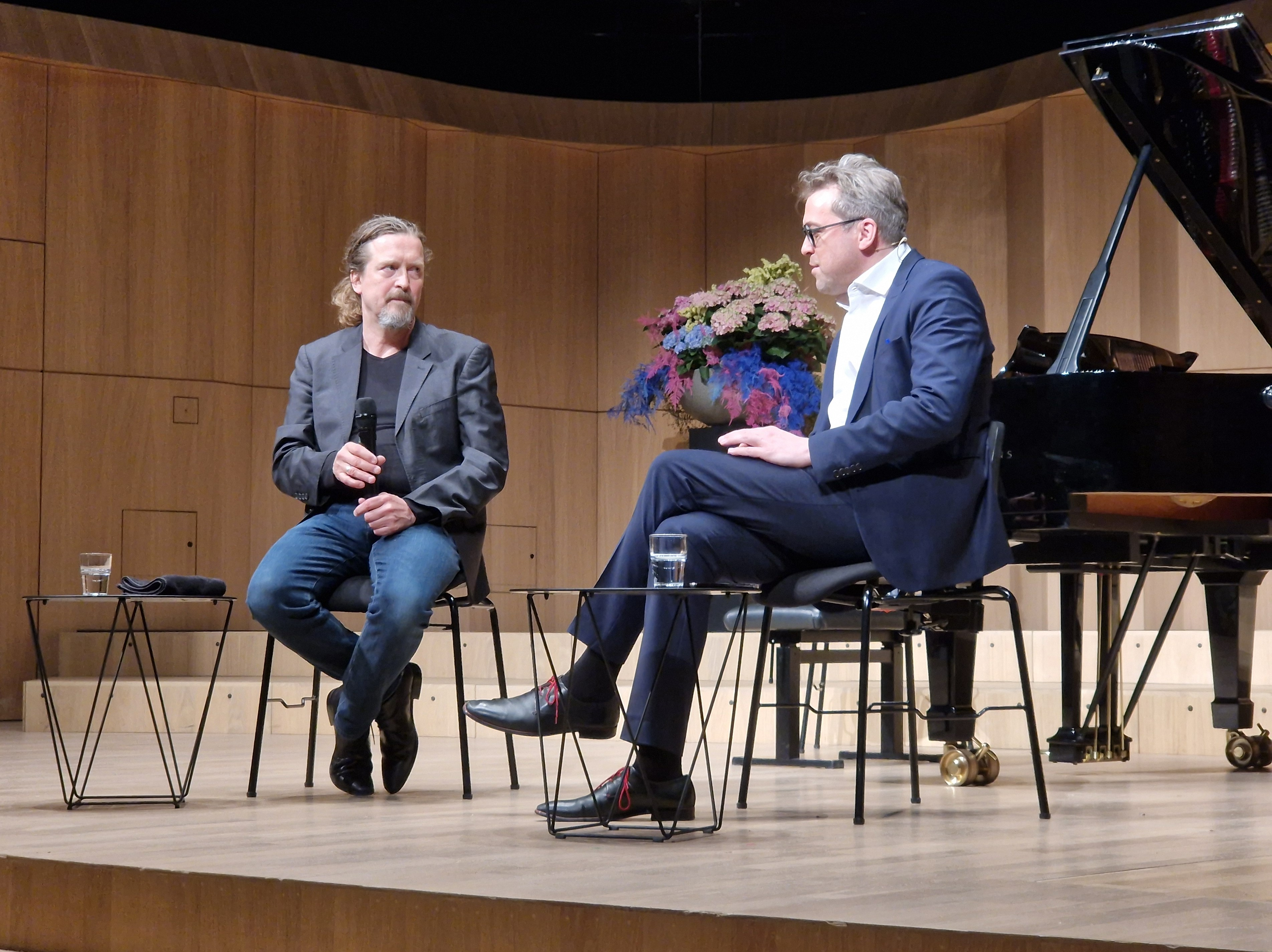
Tetzlaff (l.) interviewed at the Casals Forum before a festival concert, May 2026

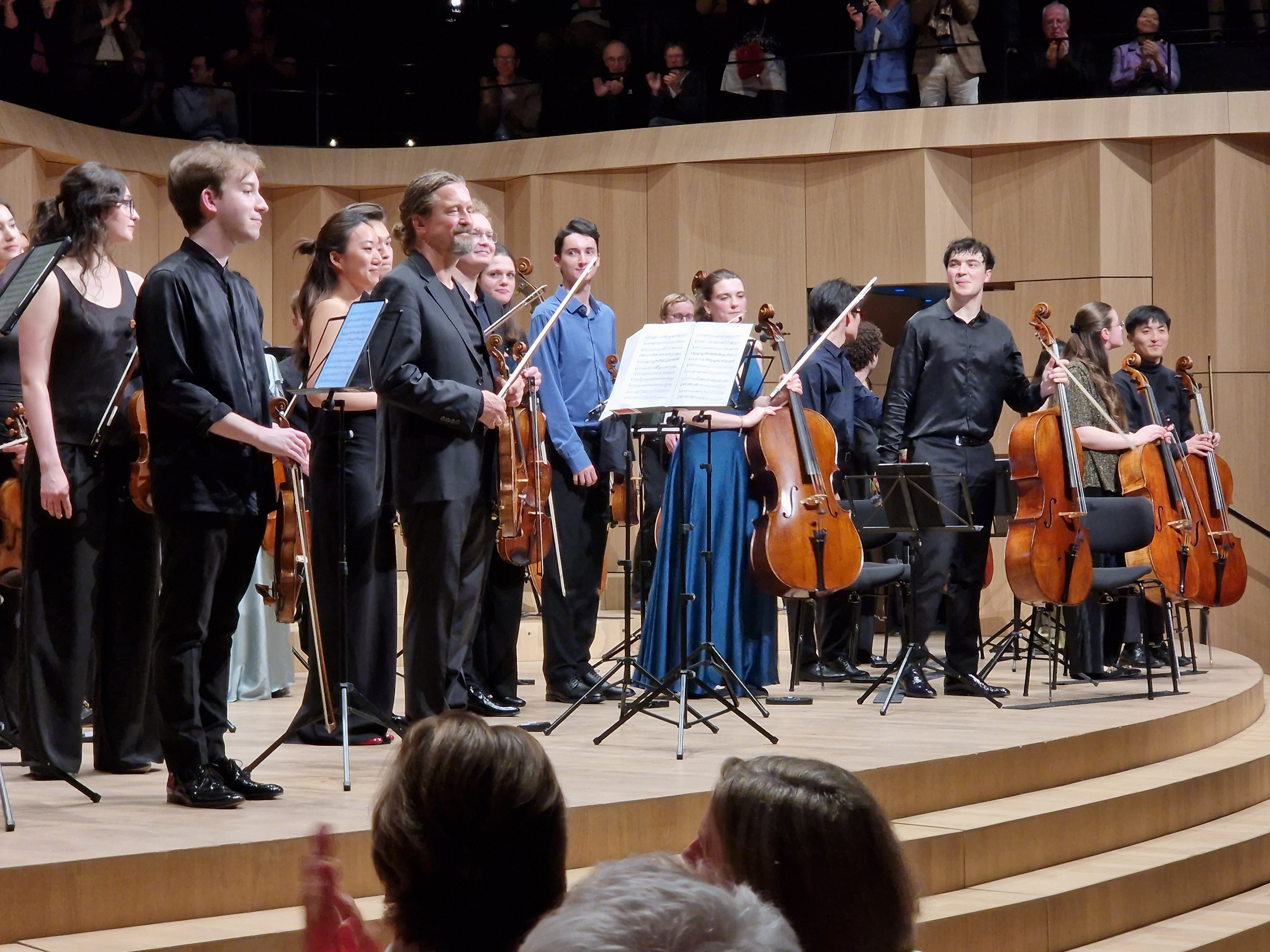
Tetzlaff and juniors of the Kronberg Academy after he led Tchaikovsky's Serenade for Strings

Tetzlaff plays a contemporary violin by Stefan-Peter Greiner which he has had since 2002, preferring it to his previous Stradivarius instrument. He uses a Peccatte bow, and Vision strings by Thomastik-Infeld in Vienna. He eschews routinely playing the violin with the full, lyrical sound preferred by many of his contemporaries, telling The New Yorker: "The listener loses the ear for the most beautiful sounds if they've been used for arbitrary, non-important things". This approach has occasionally left Tetzlaff open to criticism. The Guardian's critic Andrew Clements argued that his recording of the Schumann piano trios, mentioned above, lacked "any sense of involvement or affection for the music", and that his 2014 release of Shostakovich's violin concertos was sometimes devoid of "character".

Tetzlaff suffers from neurodermatitis in his left hand, which can cause extreme pain when the hand's fingers are applied to the strings of a violin. Over the years he has managed the condition in a variety of ways, including by using cotton thimbles to cover his fingers, and more recently by increasing his blood circulation by exercising before performances.

== Awards ==
Musical America named Tetzlaff Instrumentalist of the year 2005. In 2012 his Schumann's piano trios (with Leif Ove Andsnes (piano) and his sister Tanja (cello) won the Gramophone Award for best chamber recording. He was named Instrumentalist of the year by Opus Klassik in 2026.

== Selected recordings ==
- Szymanowski: Concerto for violin N° 1, Symphony N° 3 "Chant de la nuit", Christian Tetzlaff, violin, Vienna Philharmonic Orchestra, Singverein Chorus, Steve Davislim, tenor, conducted by Pierre Boulez. OCLC 1184374335 CD Deutsche Grammophon 2009 and 2010. Diapason d'or of the Year 2011
