= Heimbach =

- Town
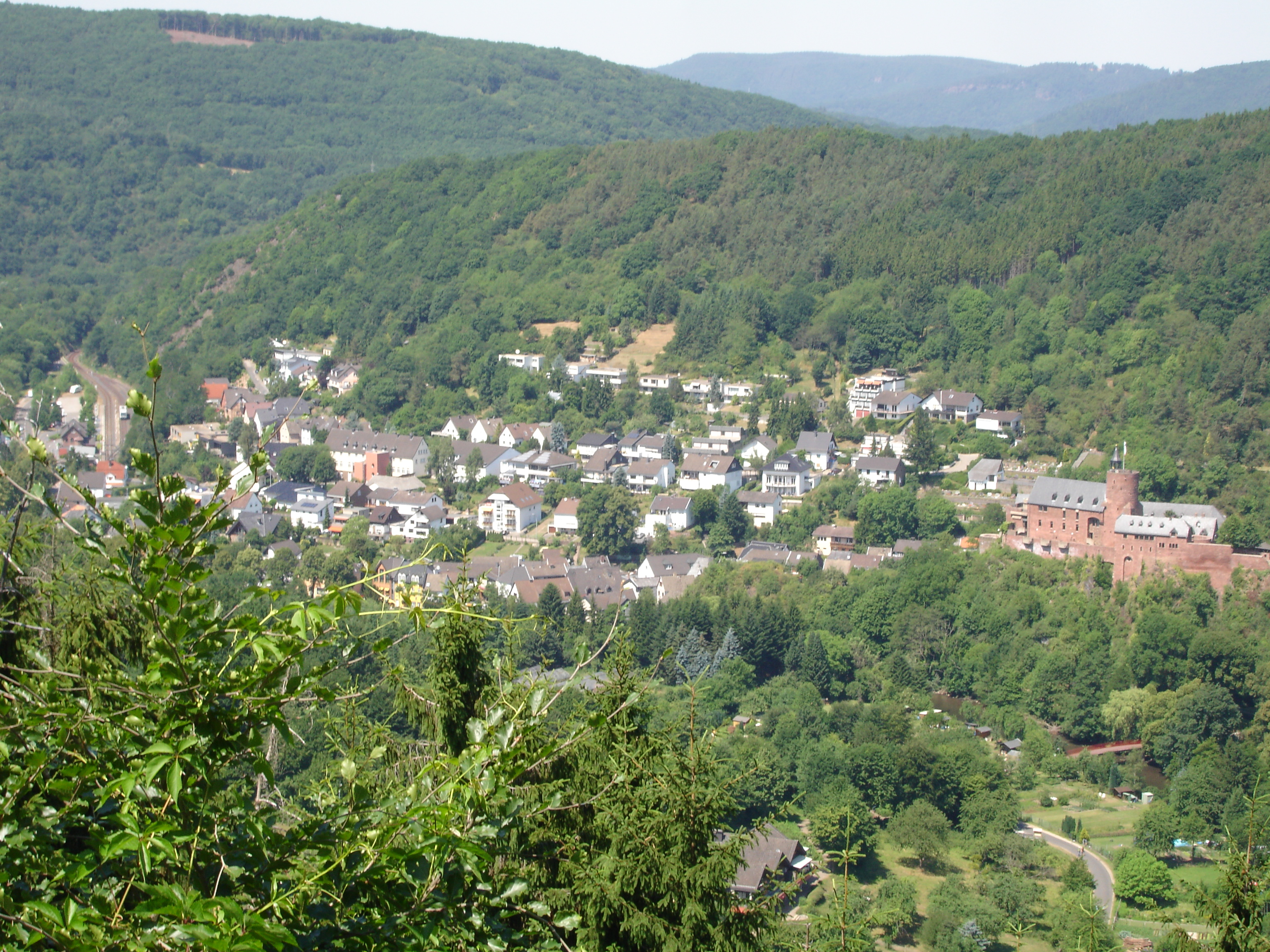

- Flag Coat of arms

- Location of Heimbach within Düren district
- Interactive map of Heimbach
- Location within Germany Location within North Rhine-Westphalia
- Coordinates: 50°38′N 06°29′E
- Country: Germany
- State: North Rhine-Westphalia
- Admin. region: Köln
- District: Düren

Government
  - Mayor (2020–30): Jochen Weiler (CDU)

Area
  - Total: 64.96 km^{2} (25.08 sq mi)
- Elevation: 227 m (745 ft)

Population (2025-12-31)
  - Total: 4,467
  - Density: 68.77/km^{2} (178.1/sq mi)
- Time zone: UTC+01:00 (CET)
  - Summer (DST): UTC+02:00 (CEST)
- Postal codes: 52396
- Dialling codes: 02446, 02425
- Vehicle registration: DN
- Website: www.heimbach-eifel.de

Heimbach (German pronunciation: [ˈhaɪmbax]) is a town in the district of Düren of the state of North Rhine-Westphalia, Germany. It is located on the river Roer, in the Eifel hills, approx. 20 km south of Düren. Heimbach has the smallest population of any town in North Rhine-Westphalia.

The town districts of Heimbach are Blens (300 residents), Düttling (85 residents), Hasenfeld (1200 residents), Hausen (270 residents), Hergarten (500 residents) and Vlatten (900 residents), which prior to 1972 were villages with their own administration. Heimbach main town has about 1100 residents. Between Hausen and Hergarten lies the hamlet of Walbig, and between Hasenfeld and Schmidt (City of Nideggen) is the hamlet of Buschfelder Hof, which formerly belonged to Blens.

== History ==
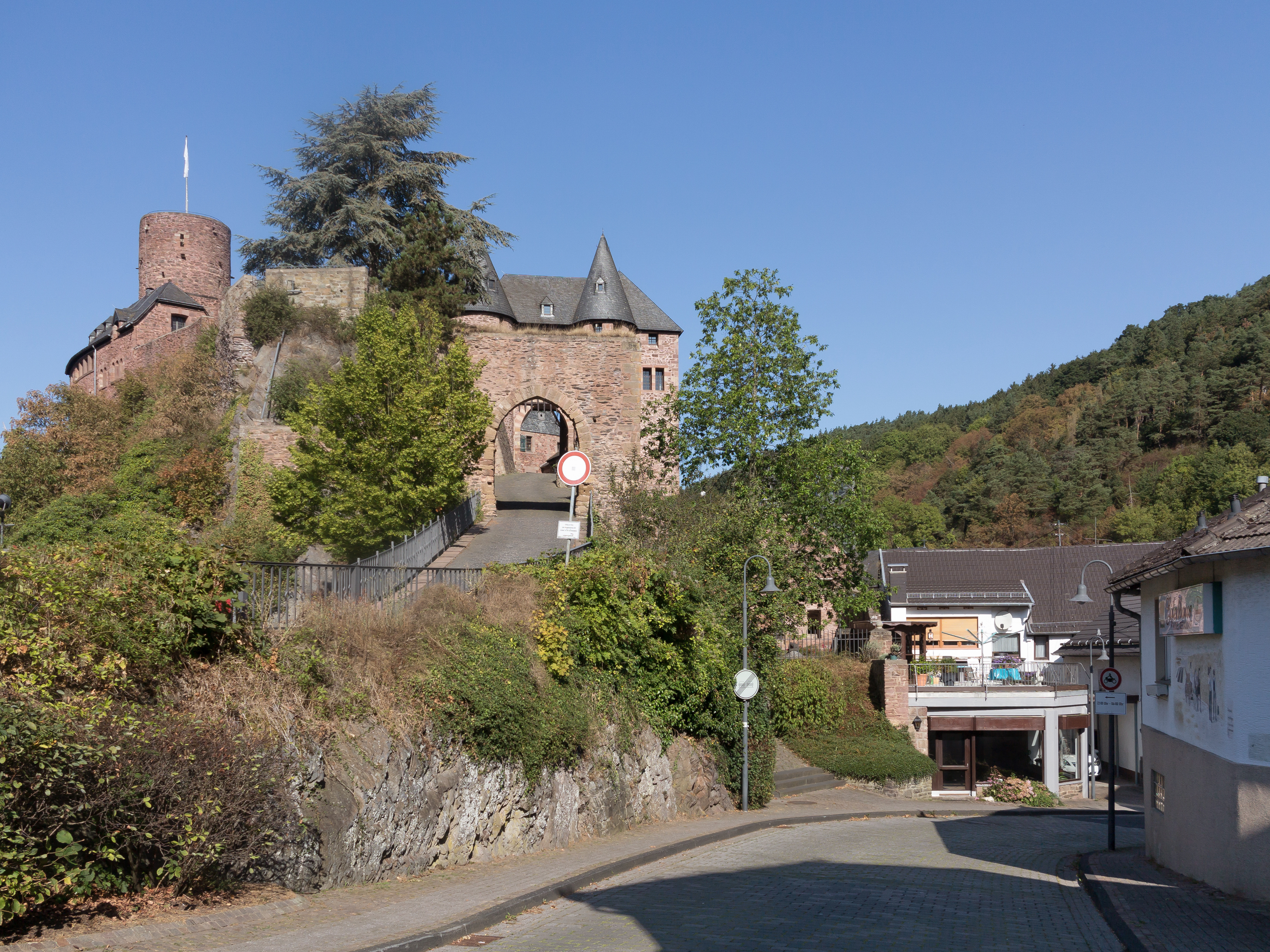
Heimbach, castle: Burg Hengebach

Heimbach and the city's Hengebach Castle was the seat of the local noble family which inherited the County of Jülich in 1207, with Heimbach annexed to the County (later the Duchy) since 1237.

During the Thirty Years' War—particularly in the later phase following France's entry into the conflict—the area around Heimbach was affected primarily by the passage of various hostile troops. After the fire of 1687 the city of Heimbach was rebuilt to house the town's population; however, the castle of Hengebach was left a ruin until 1904 when restoration work began. Now restored, the castle is owned and operated as a tourist attraction by the city of Heimbach. The castle is located on a rocky outcrop in the middle of Heimbach. Today it is used as a restaurant and a location for public events.

1797 until 1814, Heimbach belonged to Department of Roer (Département de la Roer) within the French First Republic and the First French Empire. Heimbach was assigned to the Canton Gemünd in the Arrondissement d'Aix-la-Chapelle (Roer) with the exception of Blens.

1815 Heimbach became part of the Prussian province Grand Duchy of the Lower Rhine, later the Rhine Province, within the German Confederation, and later the German Empire. Heimbach was assigned to the Kreis Gemünd, later Kreis Schleiden.

Heimbach was connected to the railway network 1903 via Düren. Tourism had been the main reason for connecting Heimbach.

Because of "Aachen-Gesetz" Heimbach came to Düren (district) 1972.

Traces of Roman presence had been found in Hasenfeld. 1739 an oratory was established by the parish of Heimbach. In 20th century Hasenfeld became larger than Heimbach main town.

Blens Castle was built about 1100 as moated castle. The family von Blens was mentioned 1138. Only a few ruins remain of the original buildings. 1791 a manor house was built.

Hausen Castle was originally built as farm estate about 1300 and in the further 14th century expanded into a moated castle. It already was dependend from the county of Juelich.

The area of the village Vlatten may be settled in Roman time, but no written proofs or buildings exist. The name refers to Celtic languages. Mentioned is the royal palace (Königspfalz, a part time residence in Frankish tradition) in the 9th century. The ruins of the moated castle (Upper Castle) probably date back to the 14th century.

Also the area of the village Hergarten had been settled in Roman time. The village was mentioned in the 9th century.

The heavy rain and flooding in July 2021 caused property damage throughout the town area.

== Geography ==
The landscape of Heimbach and its town districts is characterized by the valley of the Roer, the Rour Reservoirs Rursee and the Heimbacher Stausee, tributary streams of the Rour, f.e. the "Heimbach" and the "Fischbach", the Rotbach-tributary Vlattener Bach, with its floodplains, hills of the Eifel like the Kermeter, the Sonnenberg, the "Meuchelberg". Parts of it belong to the Eifel National Park.

Main town Heimbach and Hasenfeld form a common settlement area between the Heimbacher Stausee, the Kermeter, the valleys of the Heimbach and the Hilbach, and the Sonnenberg. The villages of Hausen and Blens are located in the Roer valley below main town Heimbach. The villages of Hergarten and Vlatten are located in the valley of the Vlattener Bach, about 4 km east of main town Heimbach. The village of Düttling ist located 1 km south of Hergarten, above the Vlattener Bach.

Heimbach has been recognized as a climatic health resort (Luftkurort) since 1974.

== Tourism ==
Heimbach is a popular town for tourists, particularly on day trips from the nearby cities of Cologne, Aachen and Düsseldorf (less than 100 km distance), but also from the Netherlands (Eindhoven f.e. is 160 km away). The main attractions are the landscapes within the Eifel National Park and the reservoirs and installations on both sides of the Rur Dam, the Monastery of Mariawald and the Hengebach castle.

Heimbach and the Monastery of Mariawald are aims of the "Heimbach-Wallfahrt" (Heimbach-Pilgrimage), to visit the pietà (Mary together with the corpus of Jesus) in the parish church of Heimbach, and the historical location (until 1804), the historical Cistercian Monastery of Mariawald. Regularly in early July the "Pilgrimage Octave" is observed, oriented towards the feast day "Visitation of Mary". The Parish and pilgrimage church with the pietá and the reredos are accessible all year round. A Stations of the Cross trail is arranged between Heimbach main town and the Monastery of Mariawald. The houses with the illustrations had been built in the 19th century after the closure of the Cistercian Priory of Mariawald. The lower section follows a path through the national park, while the upper part runs along the enclosure wall of the monastery.

The renowned Spannungen chamber music concerts, founded by Lars Vogt, which take place in the Art Nouveau power station are also popular and have attracted musicians such as Sharon Cam and Sabine Meyer. The "Spannungen" take place regularly in June each year. While the year, a small museum is accessible, but only with guide.

The Hengebach Castle is now place of the "Internationale Kunstakademie Heimbach" (international art academy). Accessible are art exhibitions (of course participants, but sometimes also contemporary art), the tower and the restaurant.

Main attraction belonging to Heimbachs part of Eifel National Park is the "Barrierefreier Naturerlebnisraum Wilder Kermeter" (Accessible nature experience area). The historical station building from 1903 is now "Nationalparktor Bahnhof Heimbach": Information desk for Heimbach, the touristic region "Dürener Rureifel" and the Eifel National Park.

The villages of Hausen and Blens, located in northern Heimbach, provide great views of rocky outcrops which are now part of a nature conservancy area. One of the many campgrounds around Heimbach lies in the shadow of these rocks.

== Demographics ==
Historical population

Year	Pop.	±% p.a.
1965	4,043	—
1970	4,153	+0.54%
1975	4,667	+2.36%
1980	4,483	−0.80%
1985	4,519	+0.16%
1990	4,405	−0.51%
1995	4,613	+0.93%

Year	Pop.	±% p.a.
2000	4,645	+0.14%
2005	4,606	−0.17%
2010	4,440	−0.73%
2015	4,366	−0.34%
2020	4,312	−0.25%
2025	4,467	+0.71%

Source: Landesdatabank Nordrhein-Westfalen

Most residents of Heimbach are Roman Catholics, attending the churches in Heimbach (St. Clemens), Hausen (St. Nikolaus), Vlatten (St. Dionysius) and Hergarten (St. Martin) and chapels in Blens (St. Georg), Hasenfeld (St. Nepomuk), Düttling (St. Apollonia) and Vlatten (St. Michael).

== Politics ==
The Mayor of Heimbach is Jochen Weiler (CDU), elected in 2020. The Council of Heimbach contains 9 members of the Christian Democratic Union, 4 members of the SPD, one member of the Green Party, one member of the FDP, 2 members of the UWV ("Independent Voters' Association") and 3 members of the AfD.

== Notable people ==
- Johann Peter Schroeder (1794–1876), politician
- Georg Frentzen (1854–1923), architect and university lecturer; built the Kraftwerk Heimbach (hydroelectric power plant of the Urfttalsperre) in Heimbach-Hasenfeld in 1904
- Franz Binz (1896–1965), Reichstag deputy of the NSDAP, lived in Heimbach
- Luise Kött-Gärtner (born 1953), sculptural artist
- Stephan Meyer (born 1947), director, lives from time to time in Heimbach
- Oliver Krischer (born 1969 in Zuelpich), Minister for Environment, Nature Protection, and Transport of the country of North Rhine-Westfalia, lived in Heimbach-Hergarten
