= Gustav Rivinius =

German cellist and university teacher (born 1965)

- Born: 1965 (age 59–60); Saarland, West Germany
- Education: Juilliard School
- Occupations: Classical cellist; Academic teacher
- Organizations: Hochschule für Musik Saar
- Awards: Concours de violoncelle Rostropovitch; International Tchaikovsky Competition

Gustav Rivinius (born in 1965 in Saarland) is a German cellist and professor for cello at the Hochschule für Musik Saar.

== Life ==
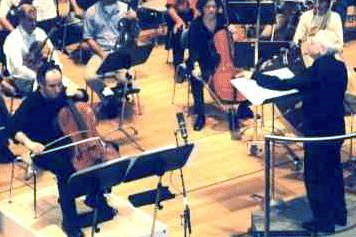
First Performance of BARDO for Cello with Curved Bow and Orchestra by Hans Zender, Cellist Gustav Rivinius with BACH.Bogen

Rivinius began his cello studies at the age of six with Hermann Dirr in Munich. Later he studied in Saarbrücken for several years with Ulrich Voss and Claus Kanngiesser, then with David Geringas in Lübeck, with Zara Nelsova at the Juilliard School in New York and finally with Heinrich Schiff in Basel. There he completed his studies with the soloist diploma.

Rivinius won numerous national and international competitions. After winning the International Tchaikovsky Competition, which was the first time that a German musician was awarded this prize, numerous concert appearances in major music metropolises in Europe, Japan, Mexico and the USA followed.

Some of the orchestras with which Rivinius has performed are the Bavarian Radio Symphony Orchestra, the Helsinki Philharmonic Orchestra, the National Symphony Orchestra in Washington, the Gulbenkian Orchestra Lisbon, the Konzerthausorchester Berlin, the Moscow Philharmonic, the St. Louis Symphony Orchestra, the Bamberg Symphony, the Royal Stockholm Philharmonic Orchestra, the hr-Sinfonieorchester, the Czech Philharmonic, the MDR Leipzig Radio Symphony Orchestra among others.

Rivinius is also dedicated to chamber music. He is a guest at numerous music festivals, such as the Schleswig-Holstein Musik Festival and the Marlboro Music School and Festival, where he has performed with musicians such as Rudolf Serkin and members of the Guarneri Quartet and the Beaux Arts Trio. He has performed at the Spannungen chamber music festival in Heimbach.

In the meantime his first CD with sonatas by Brahms, Boccherini and B.A. Zimmermann has been released. In 1993 he recorded the complete cello sonatas by Ludwig van Beethoven for the WDR. 1995 he produced the cello concerto by Ermanno Wolf-Ferrari. Between 2001 and 2009 he was a lecturer at Villa Musica several times.

== Performances ==
- List of 32 interpretations on the Deutsche Nationalbibliothek.
- IX international Tchaikovsky competition : cello..

== Awards ==
- 1986: 2nd Grand Prize of the Concours de violoncelle Rostropovitch (Paris).
- 1990: 1st prize of the International Tchaikovsky Competition.
- Felix-Mendelssohn-Bartholdy-Preis.
- 2016: Kunstpreis des Saarlandes

== Recordings ==
- Ermanno Wolf-Ferrari: Cello Concerto, Op. 31 / Sinfonia Brevis, Op. 28. (1996)

== Sources ==
- Porträt Hochschule für Musik Saar
