= Antje Weithaas =

German violinist (born 1966)

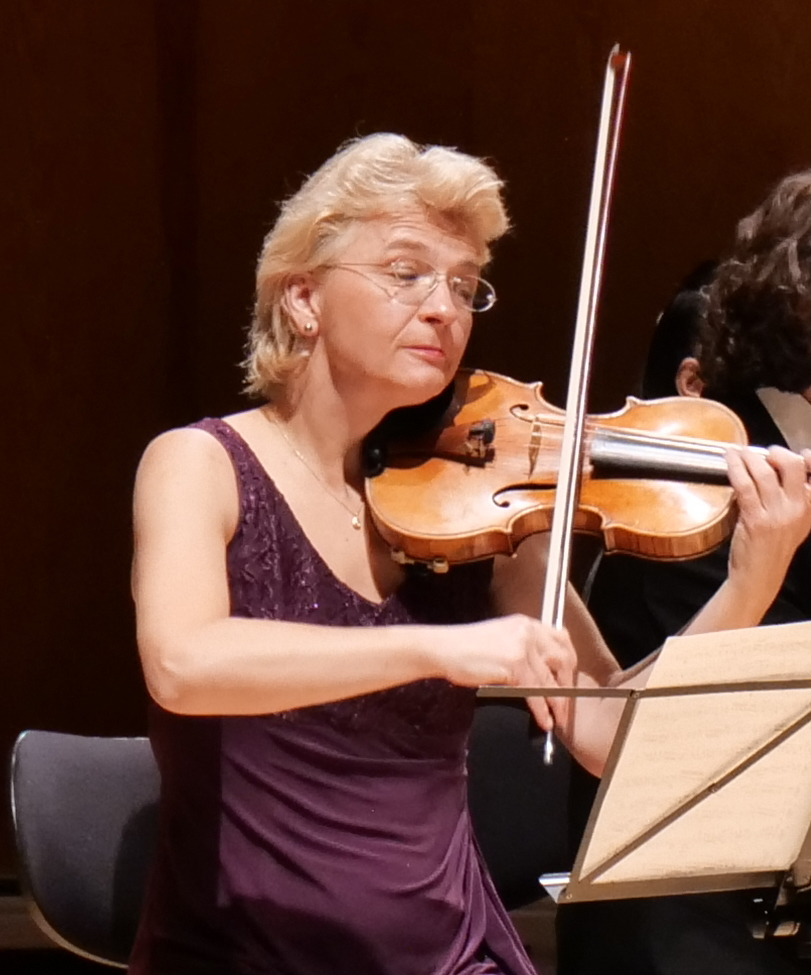
- Weithaas in 2019
- Born: 1966 (age 59–60); Guben, East Germany
- Education: Hochschule für Musik Hanns Eisler in Berlin
- Occupations: Western classical violinist; Academic teacher
- Organizations: Berlin University of the Arts; Hochschule für Musik Hanns Eisler
- Awards: International Johann Sebastian Bach Competition
- Website: antje-weithaas.de

Antje Weithaas (born 1966) is a German classical violinist. Apart from solo recitals and chamber music performances, she has played with leading orchestras in Europe, Asia and the United States.

== Career ==
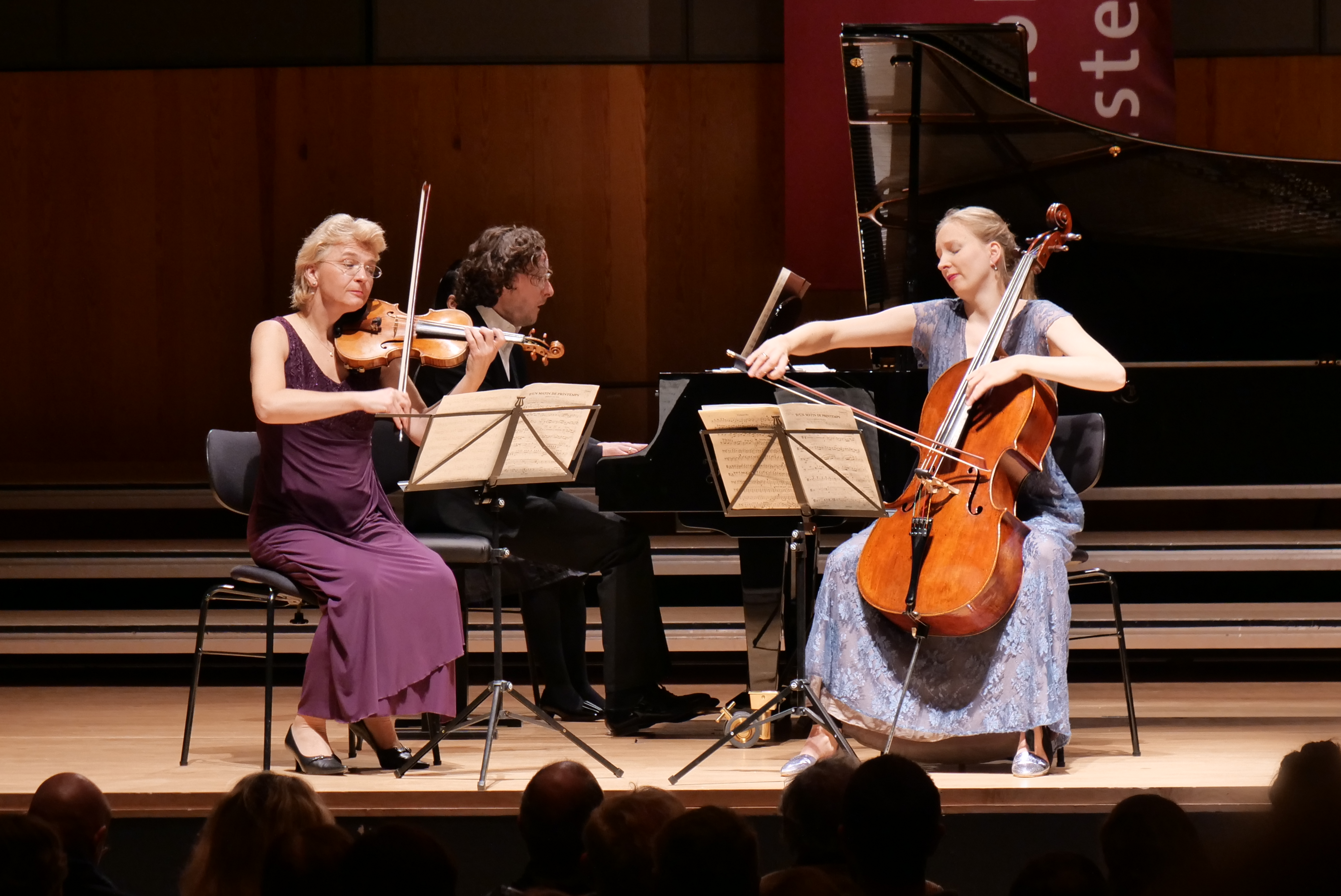
Weithaas, Martin Helmchen and Marie-Elisabeth Hecker in 2019 at the Hochschule für Musik Detmold

Born in Guben, Weithaas studied at the Hochschule für Musik "Hanns Eisler" in Berlin. In 1987 she won the Kreisler-Wettbewerb in Graz, in 1988 the International Johann Sebastian Bach Competition in Leipzig and in 1991 the International Joseph Joachim Violin Competition in Hannover, whose artistic director she became in 2019. Weithaas worked for some years as a professor at the Berlin University of the Arts and moved in 2004 to the Hochschule für Musik "Hanns Eisler". Since 2017, she has also taught at the Kronberg Academy.

Weithaas plays a 2001 instrument by Stefan-Peter Greiner.

Apart from solo recitals and chamber music performances, Weithaas has played with the Deutsches Symphonie-Orchester Berlin and Bamberg Symphony as well as with the Los Angeles Philharmonic, San Francisco Symphony, Philharmonia Orchestra, BBC Symphony Orchestra and leading orchestras in the Netherlands, Scandinavia and Asia, with conductors such as Vladimir Ashkenazy, Neville Marriner, Marc Albrecht, Yakov Kreizberg, Sakari Oramo and Carlos Kalmar. Central to her chamber music work is the Arcanto Quartet, with Daniel Sepec, Tabea Zimmermann and Jean-Guihen Queyras. Harmonia Mundi has published her recordings of works by Béla Bartók, Johannes Brahms, Maurice Ravel, Henri Dutilleux, Claude Debussy and Franz Schubert.

Weithaas partners with the pianist Silke Avenhaus on tours and on five recordings of works by Schubert, Brahms, Felix Mendelssohn, Antonín Dvořák, Josef Suk and French composers on the label CAvi-Music. As the artistic director of Camerata Bern, Weithaas was responsible for the recording of two Beethoven works for the ensemble's 50th anniversary, the String Quartet No. 11 and Richard Tognetti's arrangement of the Kreutzer Sonata.

Other collaborators in chamber music include the cellist Clemens Hagen, the clarinettist Sharon Kam, Christian Tetzlaff (violin) and Tanja Tetzlaff (cello) and the pianist Lars Vogt. Weithaas is part of the core of artists appearing at the festival Spannungen – Musik im Kraftwerk Heimbach, at the electrical power station Kraftwerk Heimbach. Weithaas, Avenhaus and the horn player Marie-Luise Neunecker perform as a trio.

== Concertos ==
Weithaas has a repertoire of classical concertos by Mozart, Beethoven and Robert Schumann, contemporary works such as Jörg Widmann's first concerto, and modern classics such as the concertos by Dmitri Shostakovich, Sergei Prokofiev, Georg Hartmann and György Ligeti, as well as rarely performed concertos such as those by Erich Wolfgang Korngold, Othmar Schoeck and Sofia Gubaidulina. Fiona Maddocks, a reviewer for The Guardian, wrote in 2015 that a recording by Weithaas of Bruch's Violin Concerto reminded her "with quiet and compelling eloquence, why it's a masterpiece".
