= Boris Pergamenschikow =

Russian cellist and composer

- Борис Миронович Пергаменщиков
- Born: 29 August 1948; Leningrad, USSR
- Died: 30 April 2004 (aged 55); Berlin, Germany
- Occupations: Classical cellist; Academic teacher
- Organizations: Hochschule für Musik Köln; Hochschule für Musik "Hanns Eisler"
- Awards: Tchaikovsky Competition

Boris Mironowitsch Pergamenschikow, Борис Миронович Пергаменщиков, Boris Piergamienszczikow (29 August 1948 in Leningrad – 30 April 2004 in Berlin), was a Russian-born cellist.

His father was also a cellist, and gave his son his first lessons.

In 1974, Boris Pergamenschikow won a gold medal at the Tchaikovsky Competition in Moscow. In 1977, he emigrated from the USSR to the West, which enabled him to start an international career. In 1984, his debut in New York was enthusiastically reviewed. Over the following years he performed as a soloist with leading orchestras and acclaimed as a chamber musician.

He moved to Germany, where he taught at the Hochschule für Musik in Cologne (1977–1992) and the Hochschule für Musik Hanns Eisler in Berlin.
