= Borletti-Buitoni Trust =

The Borletti-Buitoni Trust ([borˌlɛttibwiˈtoːni]) (BBT) was established as a charitable trust in 2002 to help young musicians throughout the world. The Trust assists classical instrumentalists, ensembles and singers in their early 20s and 30s to further develop their international careers with awards that fund tailor-made projects. The first awards were made in 2003.

The Trust confidentially invites respected figures in the classical music profession to nominate young artists for consideration. Awards are announced in February every other year according to the judgement of the Artistic Committee which comprises Adam Gatehouse, Ara Guzelimian, Roger Wright, and Mitsuko Uchida. Honorary Committee members include pianists Leif Ove Andsnes and Jonathan Biss, a 2003 recipient of the Award, as well as violinist Christian Tetzlaff. Committee Emeriti members include arts consultant Martijn Sanders and music consultant Andrew Starling. Uchida has the distinction of being a founding trustee of the organization.

In addition to the financial budgets, which range from £20,000 to £30,000, the Trust offers support in matters such as public relations and media communications. Periodically, the Trust also organizes residencies, showcase concerts and concert tours for selected award winners.

As of 2019, BBT's trustees are Ilaria Borletti-Buitoni, Paul Cutts, and David Landau.

Founding trustee and artistic committee member Franco Buitoni died on 16 August 2016. His wife Ilaria Borletti Buitoni created the biennial Franco Buitoni Award as a tribute to his lifelong love and promotion of chamber music.

BBT Communities was set up as another branch of the Trust in 2019 with the aim of giving financial support to charities and organizations that help underprivileged communities through music. The first grants are announced in June 2019.

== Honorees ==
Award Winners and Fellowship Recipients
Year	Recipient	Category	Honor
2003	Emma Bell	Soprano	Award Winner
2003	Jonathan Biss	Piano	Award Winner
2003	Martin Fröst	Clarinet	Award Winner
2003	Hyunah Yu	Soprano	Award Winner
2003	Sol Gabetta	Cello	Fellowship
2003	Jerusalem Quartet	String Quartet	Fellowship
2003	Kuss Quartet	String Quartet	Fellowship
2003	Anna Polonsky	Piano	Fellowship
2004	Gautier Capuçon	Cello	Award Winner
2004	Katona Twins	Guitar	Award Winner
2004	Viviane Hagner	Violin	Award Winner
2004	Leopold String Trio	Ensemble	Award Winner
2004	Llŷr Williams	Piano	Award Winner
2004	Christian Poltéra	Cello	Award Winner
2004	David Cohen	Cello	Fellowship
2004	Simon Crawford-Phillips & Philip Moore	Piano Duo	Fellowship
2004	Martin Helmchen	Piano	Fellowship
2005	Colin Currie	Percussion	Award Winner
2005	Soovin Kim	Violin	Award Winner
2005	Christianne Stotijn	Mezzo-soprano	Award Winner
2005	Shai Wosner	Piano	Award Winner
2005	Dimitri Maslennikov	Cello	Fellowship
2005	Royal String Quartet	String Quartet	Fellowship
2005	Quartetto di Cremona	String Quartet	Fellowship
2005	Robin Ticciati	Conductor	Fellowship
2005	Ralph van Raat	Piano	Fellowship
2006	Joshua Hopkins	Baritone	Award Winner
2006	Andrew Kennedy	Tenor	Award Winner
2006	Antoine Tamestit	Viola	Award Winner
2006	Jörgen van Rijen	Trombone	Award Winner
2006	Ronan Collett	Baritone	Fellowship
2006	David Trio	Piano Trio	Fellowship
2006	Ieva Jokubaviciute	Piano	Fellowship
2007	Jermolaj Albiker	Violin	Award Winner
2007	Alexei Ogrintchouk	Oboe	Award Winner
2007	Quatuor Ébène	String Quartet	Award Winner
2007	Vilde Frang	Violin	Fellowship
2007	Lavinia Meijer	Harp	Fellowship
2007	Navarra Quartet	String Quartet	Fellowship
2007	Julian Steckel	Cello	Fellowship
2007	Irina Zahharenkova	Piano	Fellowship
2008	Alina Ibragimova	Violin	Award Winner
2008	Daniela Lehner	Mezzo-soprano	Award Winner
2008	Shenyang	Bass-baritone	Award Winner
2008	Andreas Brantelid	Cello	Fellowship
2008	Allan Clayton	Tenor	Fellowship
2008	Veronika Eberle	Violin	Fellowship
2008	Leonard Elschenbroich	Cello	Fellowship
2009	Erik Bosgraaf	Recorder	Award Winner
2009	Marie-Elisabeth Hecker	Cello	Award Winner
2009	Nicolas Altstaedt	Cello	Fellowship
2009	Mahan Esfahani	Harpsichord	Fellowship
2009	Tine Thing Helseth	Trumpet	Fellowship
2009	Trio Mondrian	Piano Trio	Fellowship
2009	Henk Neven	Baritone	Fellowship
2009	Francesco Piemontesi	Piano	Fellowship
2010	Khatia Buniatishvili	Piano	Award Winner
2010	Elias String Quartet	String Quartet	Award Winner
2010	Gabriele Carcano	Piano	Fellowship
2010	Ramón Ortega Quero	Oboe	Fellowship
2010	Adam Walker	Flute	Fellowship
2011	Hyeyoon Park	Violin	Award Winner
2011	Bram van Sambeek	Bassoon	Award Winner
2011	Elizabeth Watts	Soprano	Award Winner
2011	Elena Xanthoudakis	Soprano	Award Winner
2011	Augustin Hadelich	Violin	Fellowship
2011	Hannes Minnaar	Piano	Fellowship
2012	Sivan Magen	Harp	Award Winner
2012	James Baillieu	Piano	Fellowship
2012	Maximilian Hornung	Cello	Fellowship
2012	Byol Kang and Boris Kusnezow	Violin and Piano Duo	Fellowship
2012	Sean Shibe	Guitar	Fellowship
2013	No Awards Presented	N/A	-
2014	Apollon Musagète Quartet	String Quartet	Award Winner
2014	Ruby Hughes	Soprano	Award Winner
2014	Itamar Zorman	Violin	Award Winner
2014	Benjamin Beilman	Violin	Fellowship
2014	Gloria Campaner	Piano	Fellowship
2014	Alec Frank-Gemmill	Horn	Fellowship
2014	Mark Simpson	Clarinet/Composer	Fellowship
2015	No Awards Presented	N/A	-
2016	Danish String Quartet	String Quartet	Award Winner
2016	Anna Lucia Richter	Mezzo-soprano	Award Winner
2016	Calidore String Quartet	String Quartet	Fellowship
2016	Alexandra Conunova	Violin	Fellowship
2016	Zoltán Fejérvári	Piano	Fellowship
2016	Maria Milstein	Violin	Fellowship
2016	Beatrice Rana	Piano	Fellowship
2016	Eivind Ringstad	Viola	Fellowship
2017	No Awards Presented	N/A	-
2018	Dudok Quartet Amsterdam	String Quartet	Award Winner
2018	Annelein Van Wauwe	Clarinet	Award Winner
2018	Trio Isimsiz	Piano Trio	Fellowship
2018	Tessa Lark	Violin	Fellowship
2018	Diyang Mei	Viola	Fellowship
2018	Alessio Pianelli	Cello	Fellowship
2019	No Awards Presented	N/A	-
2020	Aris Quartett	String Quartet	Award Winner
2020	Filippo Gorini	Piano	Award Winner
2020	Alexi Kenney	Violin	Award Winner
2020	Amatis Trio	Piano Trio	Fellowship
2020	Timothy Ridout	Viola	Fellowship
2020	Simone Rubino	Percussion	Fellowship
2020	Trio Sōra	Piano Trio	Fellowship
2021	No Awards Presented	N/A	-
2022	Anastasia Kobekina	Cello	Award Winner
2022	Geneva Lewis	Violin	Award Winner
2022	James Newby	Baritone	Award Winner
2022	Ema Nikolovska	Mezzo-soprano	Award Winner
2022	Consone Quartet	String Quartet	Fellowship
2022	Alessandro Fisher	Tenor	Fellowship
2022	Zlatomir Fung	Cello	Fellowship
2022	Lucie Horsch	Recorder	Fellowship
2022	Theodore Platt	Baritone	Fellowship
