= Antoine Tamestit =

French violist (born 1979)

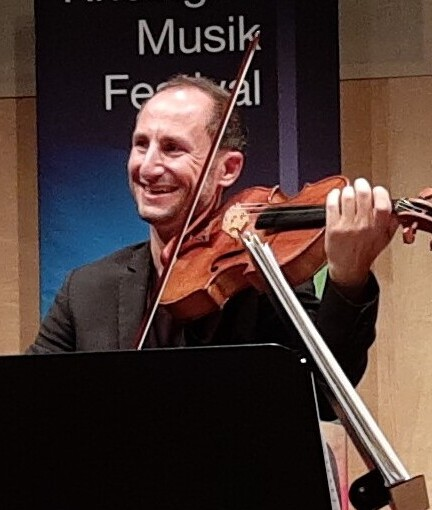
- Tamestit at Rheingau Musik Festival 2023
- Born: 1979 (age 46–47); Paris
- Occupation: Violist
- Website: www.antoinetamestit.com/about

Antoine Tamestit (born 1979) is a French violist. He premiered several contemporary compositions, including Jörg Widmann's Viola Concerto (2015). Tamestit plays the Stradivarius viola Gustav Mahler.

== Life and career ==
Tamestit was born in Paris. He studied at the Conservatoire de Paris with Jean Sulem, and further with Jesse Levine at Yale University, and with Tabea Zimmermann. He was a BBC Radio 3 New Generation Artist from 2004 to 2006.

He has performed at such venues as the Royal Concertgebouw, the Vienna Musikverein, and Carnegie Hall and with the Santa Cecilia Orchestra in Rome [14 March 2019]. In 2014, he played viola for the recording of Berlioz's Harold en Italie, conducted by Valery Gergiev.

Tamestit premiered several contemporary compositions, including Thierry Escaich's La Nuit des chants, Bruno Mantovani's Concerto pour deux altos et orchestre and Olga Neuwirth's Remnants of songs… an Amphigory and Weariness heals Wounds. In 2015, he premiered Jörg Widmann's Viola Concerto, which was commissioned by him, with the Orchestre de Paris and Paavo Järvi. This concerto depicts Tamestit's skills and character.

Tamestit played chamber music with Emmanuel Ax, Isabelle Faust, Martin Fröst, Leonidas Kavakos, Yo-Yo Ma, Emmanuel Pahud, Francesco Piemontesi, Cédric Tiberghien, Yuja Wang, Jörg Widmann, Shai Wosner, and the Ébène Quartet.

Together with Frank Peter Zimmermann and Christian Poltéra, Tamestit founded the Trio Zimmermann.

He was professor at the Musikhochschule in Cologne, the Conservatoire de Paris, and teaches in masterclasses at the Kronberg Academy.

Tamestit plays on the first viola made in 1672 by Antonio Stradivari, called Gustav Mahler.

== Awards ==
- 2001 Primrose International Viola Competition
- 2003 Young Concert Artists International Auditions
- 2004 ARD International Music Competition
- 2008 Credit Suisse Young Artist Award
- 2022 Hindemith Prize of the City of Hanau

== Discography ==
- Tamestit, Antoine; Debussy, Claude; Bartók, Béla; Bruckner, Anton; LSO; London Symphony Orchestra (2017), François-Xavier Roth conducts Debussy, Bartók, and Bruckner – With Antoine Tamestit : London Symphony Orchestra, LSO, OCLC 1252973382
- Hoyer, Myriam; Cuvillier, Jérémie; Accardo, Salvatore; Tamestit, Antoine; Capuçon, Gautier; Pressler, Menahem; Schumann, Robert; Brahms, Johannes; Idéale Audience International; ARTE France (2008), Menahem Pressler, Salvatore Accardo, Antoine Tamestit, Gautier Capuçon : Schumann and Brahms, Idéale Audience : Arte France, OCLC 956370543
- Widmann, Jörg; Bouchkov, Marc; Harding, Daniel; Philippe, Bruno; Tamestit, Antoine; Signum-Kvartetten; Bayriske Radios Symfoniorkester (München) (2018), Viola concerto (in undetermined language), Harmonia Mundi Musique, OCLC 1283940529
- Mozart, Wolfgang Amadeus; Capuçon, Renaud; Langrée, Louis; Levin, Robert; Tamestit, Antoine; Skotske Kammerorkester (2009), Violin concertos nos 1 & 3 (in undetermined language), [S.l.]: EMI : Virgin Classics, OCLC 871891378
- Mozart, Wolfgang Amadeus; Andsnes, Leif Ove; Brovtsyn, Boris; Fröst, Martin; Jansen, Janine; Levin, Robert; Rysanov, Maksim; Tamestit, Antoine; Thedéen, Torleif; Deutsche Kammerphilharmonie (2013), Clarinet concerto (in undetermined language), BIS Records, OCLC 874828949
- Berlioz, Hector; Cargill, Karen; Gerg'ev, Valerij; Tamestit, Antoine; Londons Symfoniorkester (2015), Harold en Italie (in undetermined language), London Symphony Orchestra, OCLC 911053972
- Tamestit, Antoine; Tiberghien, Cédric; Vieuxtemps, Henri; Donizetti, Gaetano; Mazas, F.; Ney, Casimir; Bellini, Vincenzo (2017), Bel canto : la voix de l'alto = the voice of viola (in no linguistic content), Arles: Harmonia Mundi, OCLC 1043756288
- Beethoven, Ludwig <van>; Poltéra, Christian; Tamestit, Antoine; Zimmermann, Frank Peter; Trio Zimmermann (2014), String Trio op. 3, Serenade op.8, s.l: BIS Records, OCLC 936050849
