= BBC Radio 3 New Generation Artists scheme =

Talent scheme run by BBC Radio 3

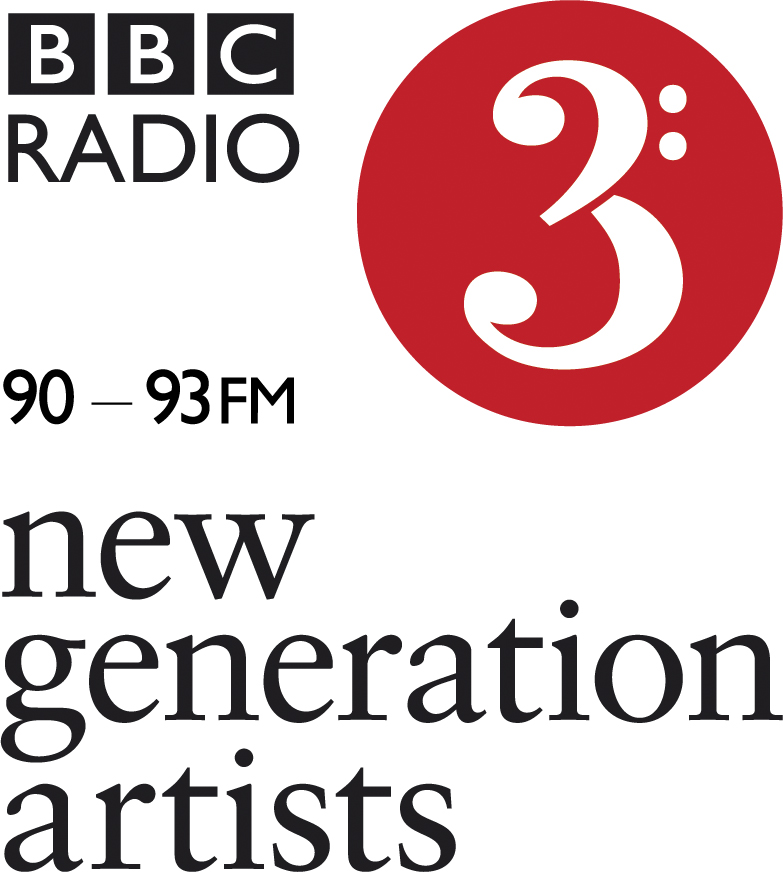
New Generation Artists logo

BBC Radio 3 New Generation Artists scheme (also known as the NGA scheme) was launched in 1999 by Adam Gatehouse as part of the BBC's commitment to young musical talent.

== Overview ==
Every Autumn, six or seven artists or groups who are on the threshold of an international career are invited to join the scheme, which offers them unique opportunities to develop their talents. These include concerts in London and around the UK, appearances and recordings with the BBC performing groups, studio recordings for BBC Radio 3 and, last but not least, the possibility of appearing at the BBC Proms.

From time to time questions are asked about the lack of detail concerning the NGA recruitment process, for example:

a scheme [...] with no transparency how the candidates are selected [...] it seems that this is being put by the wayside in favour of a vapid internationalist approach which serves only those who already have a big profile and international connections.

== Participants ==
- 2025-2027
  - Astatine Trio (UK)
  - Erika Baikoff soprano (US)
  - Andrew Hamilton baritone (UK)
  - NOVO Quartet (Denmark)
  - Oleg Shebeta-Dragan clarinet (Ukraine)
  - Lukas Sternath piano (Austria)
- 2024-2026
  - Julius Asal piano (Germany)
  - Hana Chang violin (US)
  - Sterling Elliott cello (US)
  - Elizaveta Ivanova flute (Russia)
  - Kleio Quartet (UK)
  - Emma Rawicz jazz saxophone (UK)
  - Santiago Sánchez, tenor (Uruguay)
- 2023–2025
  - James Atkinson, baritone (UK)
  - Chaos String Quartet (Europe)
  - Alim Beisembayev] piano (Kazakhstan)
  - Giorgi Gigashvili] piano (Georgia)
  - Niamh O'Sullivan mezzo-soprano (Republic of Ireland)
  - Michael Pandya, collaborative piano (UK)
  - Johanna Wallroth soprano (Sweden)
- 2022–2024
  - Fergus McCreadie jazz piano (UK)
  - Geneva Lewis violin (New Zealand)
  - Hugh Cutting, countertenor (UK)
  - Leonkoro Quartet (Germany)
  - Masabane Cecilia Rangwanasha soprano (South Africa)
  - Ryan Corbett, accordion (UK)
  - Santiago Cañón-Valencia, cello (Colombia)
  - Leonkoro Quartet (Germany)
- 2021–2023
  - Helen Charlston, mezzo-soprano (UK)
  - Konstantin Krimmel, baritone (Germany)
  - Kunal Lahiry, collaborative piano (Indian-American)
  - María Dueñas violin (Spain)
  - Mithras Trio, piano trio (UK)
  - Tom Borrow, piano (British-Israeli)
  - William Thomas, bass (UK)
- 2019–2022
  - Eric Lu piano (United States)
  - Alexander Gadjiev piano (Slovenia/Italy)
  - Timothy Ridout viola (UK)
  - Consone Quartet (UK)
  - Johan Dalene, violin (Sweden)
  - Rob Luft jazz guitar (UK)
  - Ema Nikoslovska, mezzo-soprano (Macedonia/Canada)
- 2018–2020
  - Alessandro Fisher, tenor (UK)
  - Anastasia Kobekina cello (Russia)
  - Aris Quartet (Germany)
  - Elisabeth Brauss piano (Germany)
  - James Newby, baritone (UK)
  - Katharina Konradi soprano (Kyrgyzstan)
- 2017–2019
  - Quatuor Arod (France)
  - Aleksey Semenenko violin (Ukraine)
  - Mariam Batsashvili piano (Georgia)
  - Simon Höfele, trumpet (Germany)
  - Catriona Morison mezzo-soprano (Scotland)
  - Thibaut Garcia guitar (France)
  - Mullov-Abbado, jazz bass (UK)
- 2016–2018
  - Amatis Piano Trio (Netherlands)
  - Andrei Ioniță (cello - Romania)
  - Ashley Riches (bass-baritone - UK)
  - Calidore Quartet (United States)
  - Eivind Holtsmark Ringstad, (viola - Norway)
  - Fatma Said (soprano - Egypt)
- 2015–2017
  - Annelien Van Wauwe (clarinet – Belgium)
  - Beatrice Rana (piano – Italy)
  - lker Arcayürek, (tenor – Turkey)
  - Kathryn Rudge, (mezzo-soprano – UK)
  - Laura Jurd (jazz trumpet – UK)
  - Peter Moore (trombone – UK)
  - Van Kuijk Quartet (France)
- 2014–2016
  - Alec Frank-Gemmill, (French horn - UK)
  - Armida Quartet (Germany)
  - Benjamin Appl (baritone - Germany)
  - Esther Yoo (violin - US/Korea/Belgium)
  - Narek Hakhnazaryan (cello - Armenia)
  - Pavel Kolesnikov (piano - Russia)
- 2013–2015
  - Kitty Whately, (mezzo-soprano - UK)
  - Olena Tokar (soprano - Ukraine)
  - Lise Berthaud (viola - France)
  - Louis Schwizgebel (piano - Switzerland)
  - Zhang Zuo (piano - China)
  - Danish String Quartet (Denmark)
- 2012–2014
  - Mark Simpson (clarinet - UK)
  - Robin Tritschler, (tenor - Ireland)
  - Elena Urioste (violin - United States)
  - Leonard Elschenbroich (cello - Germany)
  - Sean Shibe (guitar - UK)L the scheme's first guitarist.
  - Apollon Musagete (string quartet - Poland)
  - Trish Clowes (jazz saxophone - UK)
- 2011–2013
  - Christian Ihle Hadland (piano - Norway)
  - Clara Mouriz (mezzo-soprano - Spain)
  - Signum Quartet (string quartet - Germany)
  - Ruby Hughes (soprano - UK)
  - Jennifer Johnston (mezzo-soprano - UK)
  - Igor Levit (piano - Germany)
  - Veronika Eberle (violin - Germany)
- 2010–2012
  - Benjamin Grosvenor (piano - UK)
  - Ben Johnson] (tenor - UK)
  - Veronika Eberle (violin - Germany)
  - Alexandra Soumm (violin - France)
  - Nicolas Altstaedt (cellist - Germany)
  - Shabaka Hutchings (jazz reeds - UK): the first jazz reeds player to join the scheme.
  - Escher String Quartet (string quartet - United States)
- 2009–2011
  - Atos Piano Trio (piano trio - Germany)
  - Khatia Buniatishvili (piano - Georgia)
  - Malin Christensson (soprano - Sweden)
  - Elias Quartet (string quartet - UK)
  - Henk Neven (baritone - Netherlands)
  - Francesco Piemontesi (piano - Switzerland)
- 2008–2010
  - Meta4 Quartet (Finland)
  - Jennifer Pike (violin - UK)
  - Tai Murray (violin - United States)
  - Daniela Lehner (mezzo-soprano - Austria)
  - Giuliano Sommerhalder (trumpet - Italy)
  - Andreas Brantelid (cello)
  - Mahan Esfahani (harpsichord - United States): joined as the scheme's first artist playing an early instrument.
  - Tom Arthurs (jazz trumpet)
- 2007–2009
  - Allan Clayton (tenor - UK)
  - Ingrid Fliter (piano - Argentina)
  - Pavel Haas Quartet (Czech)
  - Maxim Rysanov (viola - Ukraine)
  - Elizabeth Watts (soprano - UK)
  - Shai Wosner (piano - Israel)
- 2006–2008
  - Aronowitz Ensemble (UK)
  - Sharon Bezaly (flute - Israel)
  - Ronan Collett (baritone - UK)
  - Ébène Quartet (string quartet - UK)
  - Danjulo Ishizaka (cello - Germany)
  - Eduard Kunz (piano - Russia)
  - Gwilym Simcock (jazz piano - UK): the first jazz artist to join the scheme.
- 2005–2007
  - Christianne Stotijn (mezzo-soprano - Netherlands)
  - Cédric Tiberghien (piano - France)
  - Martin Helmchen (piano - Germany)
  - Alina Ibragimova (violin - Russia)
  - Andrew Kennedy (tenor - UK)
  - Alexei Ogrintchouk (oboe - Russia)
  - Psophos Quartet (France)
- 2004–2006
  - Christian Poltera (cello - Switzerland)
  - Christine Rice (mezzo-soprano - UK)
  - Trio Ondine (Piano Trio - Denmark)
  - Alison Balsom (trumpet - UK)
  - Antoine Tamestit (viola - France)
  - Royal String Quartet (Poland)
  - Andrew Kennedy (tenor - UK)
- 2003–2005
  - Llyr Williams (piano - UK)
  - Artemis Quartet (Germany)
  - Ailish Tynan (soprano - Ireland)
  - Martin Fröst (clarinet - Sweden)
  - Colin Currie (percussion - UK)
- 2002–2004
  - Jonathan Lemalu (bass-baritone - New Zealand)
  - Jonathan Biss (piano - United States)
  - Claudio Bohorquez (cello)
  - Janine Jansen (violin - Netherlands)
  - The Galliard Ensemble (UK)
  - Sally Matthews (soprano - UK)
- 2001–2003
  - Simon Trpceski (piano - Macedonia)
  - Alice Coote (mezzo-soprano - UK)
  - Ilya Gringolts (violin)
  - Li-Wei Qin (cello - Australia/China)
  - Karol Szymanowski Quartet (Germany)
  - Lawrence Power (viola - UK)
- 2000–2002
  - Alexander Melnikov (piano - Russia)
  - Ashley Wass (piano - UK)
  - Kungsbacka Piano Trio
  - Ronald Van Spaendonck (clarinet - Belgium)
  - Emma Bell (soprano - UK)
  - James Rutherford (bass-baritone)
- 1999–2001
  - Lisa Batiashvili (violin - Georgia)
  - Alban Gerhardt (cello - Germany)
  - Steven Osborne (piano - UK)
  - Paul Lewis (piano - UK)
  - Belcea Quartet (UK)
  - Jerusalem Quartet (Israel)
  - François-Frédéric Guy (piano - France)
  - Natalie Clein (cello - UK)
  - Lisa Milne (soprano - UK)
  - Christopher Maltman (baritone - UK)
  - Emily Beynon (flute - UK)
  - Leopold String Trio (UK)

== BBC Young Musician of the Year ==
Several New Generation Artists had preiously been BBC Young Musician of the Year winners or finalists..

- Winners
  - Natalie Clein (cello) – 1994
  - Guy Johnston (cello) – 2000 (joined NGA scheme as part of Aronowitz Ensemble)
  - Jennifer Pike (violin) – 2002
  - Mark Simpson (clarinet) – 2006
  - Peter Moore (trombone) – 2008
- Finalists
  - Colin Currie (percussion) – 1994
  - Alison Balsom (trumpet) – 1998
  - Magnus Johnston (violin) – 1998 (joined NGA scheme as part of Aronowitz Ensemble)
  - Tom Poster (piano) – 2000 (joined NGA scheme as part of Aronowitz Ensemble)
  - Benjamin Grosvenor (piano) – 2004

== 10th Anniversary events ==
To celebrate the tenth anniversary of the New Generation Artists scheme, over fifty New Generation Artists past and present performed 12 concerts during the bank holiday weekend Saturday 29th - Monday 31 August at the Cadogan Hall in London, as part of the 2009 BBC Proms.

== Collaborations ==
As part of the scheme Radio 3 has also collaborated with record companies, including nine co-production CDs with EMI Debut series, three of which (Belcea Quartet, Simon Trpceski and Jonathan Lemalu) have won Gramophone Awards for the best Debut CD of the year. There have also been co-productions with Harmonia Mundi, Decca, BIS, Sony Classical, Onyx, Signum and Basho Music, while a number of New Generation Artists have also featured on BBC Music Magazine cover CDs.
