= Timothy Ridout =

British violist (b.1995)

- Born: Waltham Forest, London, England
- Genre: Classical
- Occupation: Musician
- Instrument: Viola

Timothy Ridout /ˈrɪdaʊt/ (born 1995) is a British violist and 1st Prizewinner of the prestigious Lionel Tertis International Viola Competition. He has performed worldwide as both a soloist and chamber musician.

== Biography ==
Ridout began his viola studies in his mid-teens at the Junior Department of the Royal Academy of Music, where he studied with Jonathan Barritt. He was also principal violist with the National Youth Orchestra of Great Britain. In 2014, he won first prize in the inaugural year of the Cecil Aronowitz International Viola Competition. Ridout continued his studies at the Royal Academy of Music in London with Martin Outram and graduated in 2016 with the Queen's Commendation for Excellence. He completed his master's at the Kronberg Academy with Nobuko Imai in 2019.

In 2016 he won 1st Prize in the Lionel Tertis International Viola Competition. He was the first British violist to win the first prize since the competition was established in 1980.

He made his debut recital at the Wigmore Hall in London in March 2017 with Anthony Hewitt (piano), and also that year released his debut album 'Vieuxtemps – Complete Works for Viola' with Champs Hill Records.

Ridout became a BBC New Generation Artist in 2019, which overlapped with being selected in 2020 by the Bowers Program of the prestigious Chamber Music Society of the Lincoln Center for a three-season residency (2021 to 2024).

In January 2020, he was the first winner of the inaugural Sir Jeffrey Tate Prize in Hamburg, established by the Hamburg Symphony Orchestra in memory of its last conductor, Jeffrey Tate.

Ridout released his second album, a quartet of orchestrally accompanied pieces, in February 2020, with the Lausanne Chamber Orchestra. In August 2020, Ridout collaborated in a recording of The Carnival of the Animals for the Decca label with the Kanneh-Masons, at Abbey Road Studios. The following August, Ridout performed the work with the Kanneh-Masons at a Family Prom at the Royal Albert Hall.

His third album, A Poet's Love, with music by Prokofiev and Schumann arranged for viola (Ridout) and piano (Frank Dupree), released in August 2021, was a Gramophone Magazine Critics' Choice, a Presto Editor's Choice and was nominated in the Chamber Music category at the International Classical Music Awards 2022.

Ridout performed the Walton Viola Concerto at the BBC Proms in August 2021 with the BBC Symphony Orchestra, conducted by Sakari Oramo. Ridout's performance was lauded by The Strad critic, who referred to his encore (Hindemith Viola Sonata, second movement), as the encore of the season.

At the Royal Philharmonic Society (RPS) Awards, held at London's Southbank Centre on 1 March 2023, Ridout received the Young Artists Award.

In May 2023, BBC Music Magazine listed Ridout amongst the twelve greatest violists of all time. The twelve listed, were: Wolfgang Amadeus Mozart, Carl Stamitz, Lionel Tertis, Rebecca Clarke, Paul Hindemith, William Primrose, Nobuko Imai, Kim Kashkashian, Yuri Bashmet, Tabea Zimmermann, Lawrence Power and Timothy Ridout.

In June 2023, Ridout was made a visiting professor at the Royal Academy of Music in London, and in 2026 joined the RAM Strings Department as Professor of Viola.

At the Gramophone Classical Music Awards on 4 October 2023, Ridout won the Concerto award for his recording of the Elgar ‘Viola Concerto’ and the Bloch Suite for Viola and Orchestra, with the BBC Symphony Orchestra and Martyn Brabbins.

Ridout was made a Fellow of the Royal Academy of Music (FRAM) in 2024.

In July 2024, at the Kissinger Sommer International Music Festival, Ridout was awarded the Luitpold Prize. In Berlin, at the Philharmonie, in December 2024, Ridout performed the world premiere of Mark Simpson's Viola Concerto, Hold Your Heart in Your Teeth, which was written for Ridout, with the Deutsches Symphonie-Orchester Berlin, conducted by Robin Ticciati. The work received its UK premiere on 25 September 2025 with the Royal Liverpool Philharmonic, conducted by Andrew Manze.

Other works written for Ridout include Shadow Walkers, written by American composer Nahre Sol as a co-commission from the Konzerthaus Dortmund, Schloss Elmau, the Verbier Festival and the University of Birmingham, where he premiered it in October 2024 with Jonathan Ware.

At the 2025 Opus Klassik awards in Berlin, Ridout won Young Instrumentalist of the Year for his 2025 solo album of unaccompanied works by Telemann, Bach, Britten and Shaw.The album also won the Instrumental Award category at the 2026 BBC Music Magazine Awards.

In March 2026, Ridout was announced as one of the Wigmore Hall's Associate Artists with a tenure of five years.

At the 52nd G7 summit in Évian-les-Bains, Ridout performed Brahms' First Piano Quartet alongside Yo-Yo Ma, Beatrice Rana and Renaud Capuçon, to an audience of world leaders including Emmanuel Macron, Volodymyr Zelenskyy, Keir Starmer and Sanae Takaichi.

=== Solo performances ===
Ridout has performed as soloist with numerous UK orchestras including the BBC Symphony Orchestra with Sakari Oramo, The Hallé with Lionel Bringuier, the BBC Philharmonic with John Wilson, Royal Northern Sinfonia, and the London Mozart Players.

Internationally he has performed alongside the Bavarian Radio Symphony Orchestra with Sir Simon Rattle Camerata Salzburg, Chamber Orchestra of Europe, Hamburger Symphoniker with Sylvain Cambreling, hr-Sinfonieorchester, Nederlands Kamerorkest, Nürnberger Symphoniker, Odense Symphony Orchestra, Orchestra dell’Opera Carlo Felice Genova with Riccardo Minasi, Orchestre de Chambre de Lausanne, Orchestre national de Lille, Orchestre national du Capitole de Toulouse with Kazuki Yamada, Tokyo Metropolitan Symphony Orchestra, Tonhalle-Orchester Zürich, and the Wdr Sinfonieorchester Köln, among others.

Ridout has played Mozart's Sinfonia Concertante with at least fifteen different violinists in professional performances. The first performance was with Maxim Vengerov in 2014. In 2023, at the Solsberg Festival, Ridout performed a chamber version of the work with violinists Veronika Eberle and Dmitry Smirnov, violist Nils Mönkemeyer, cellists Sol Gabetta and Victor Julien-Laferrière, and double bassist Uxía Martínez Botana.

=== Chamber Music ===
Ridout has performed in solo and ensemble programmes in numerous venues including the Alice Tully Hall in New York, the Concertgebouw in Amsterdam, and the Wigmore Hall in London. He has performed and collaborated with many leading musicians, such as Nicolas Altstaedt, Joshua Bell Daniel Blendulf, Isabelle Faust, Benjamin Grosvenor, Steven Isserlis, Janine Jansen, Denis Kozhukhin, Mischa Maisky, Hyeyoon Park, Kian Soltani, and Christian Tetzlaff. He performs, and has made recordings with pianists James Baillieu, Frank Dupree and Anthony Hewitt.

Ridout currently plays a viola by the Brescian violin maker Pellegrino Micheli c.1565–75 on loan from the Beare's International Violin Society. The viola's back length is about 44 cm (~17.3 inches), but the bridge is further up the body than normal, so the playable string length is less and hence more manageable than what would be typical for such a large instrument.He previously played on a 1677 viola by the Italian luthier, Giovanni Grancino.

== Discography ==
=== Albums ===
Debut Album: Vieuxtemps, Complete Works for Viola, Timothy Ridout (viola), Ke Ma (piano). Champs Hill Records. Released 2017

Britten, Vaughan-Williams, Hindemith, Martinu – Music for Viola and Chamber Orchestra, Lausanne Chamber Orchestra, cond. Jamie Phillips. Claves Records. Released Feb. 2020

A Poet's Love – Prokofiev: Romeo & Juliet. Schumann: Dichterliebe. Timothy Ridout (viola), Frank Dupree (piano). Harmonia Mundi, Nova. Released Aug. 2021.

Berlioz, Harold en Italie, Orchestre philharmonique de Strasbourg, conducted by John Nelson. CD Erato Released 2022

Elgar: Viola Concerto. Bloch: Suite For Viola and Orchestra. Timothy Ridout (viola), BBC Symphony Orchestra, Martyn Brabbins. Harmonia Mundi. Release Date: 13 Jan 2023. (Diapason d’Or)

A Lionel Tertis Celebration: Works by Bowen, Brahms, Bridge, Clarke, Coates, Fauré, Forsyth, Ireland, Kreisler, Mendelssohn, Schumann, Tertis, Vaughan Williams and Wolstenholme. Timothy Ridout (viola), Frank Dupree (piano), James Baillieu (piano). Harmonia Mundi. Released January 2024

Solo Album: Telemann / Bach / Britten / Shaw: Works for Unaccompanied Viola – Timothy Ridout. Bach: Partita No.2 in D Minor BWV1004; Britten, Elegy; Caroline Shaw, In manus tuas; Telemann Fantasias: no.1 in B flat major TWV40:14; no.7 in E flat major TWV40:20. Harmonia Mundi. Released February 2025

Alto Appassionato – Works for viola and piano, by Fauré, Honnoré, Büsser, Enescu, and Franck. Timothy Ridout (viola), Jonathan Ware (piano). Harmonia Mundi. Released 24 April 2026

=== Collaborations ===
Oliver Davis – Liberty, for Violin, Viola, Piano and Strings: Kerenza Peacock (violin), Timothy Ridout (viola) & Huw Watkins (piano). Liberty, Oliver Davis, Royal Philharmonic Orchestra, cond. Paul Bateman. Signum Classics. Released 2018.

Tchaikovsky & Borodin – String Quartets No. 2. Julian Steckel, Anna Reszniak, Antje Weithaas, Tanja Tetzlaff, Byol Kang, Barbara Buntrock and Timothy Ridout. Avi Label. Released October 2019.

Gliere, Shostakovich & Hahn – Glière: Octet Op. 5; Hahn, R: Piano Quintet in F sharp minor; Shostakovich: Two pieces for string octet, Op. 11. Hanna Weinmeister, Tanja Tetzlaff, Florian Donderer, Byol Kang, Gergana Gergova, Timothy Ridout and Arturo Pizarro. Avi Label. Released October 2019.

Suk – Piano Quintet in G minor, Op. 8; Things Lived and Dreamt, Op. 30. Kiveli Dorken (piano), Christian Tetzlaff (violin), Florian Donderer (violin), Timothy Ridout (viola), Tanja Tetzlaff (cello). Ars Produktion. Released 2020.

Hindemith – Kammermusik. Kronberg Academy Soloists. Schleswig-Holstein Festival Orchestra, Christoph Eschenbach. Ondine. Released September 2020.

Saint-Saens – Carnival of the Animals. The Kanneh-Masons, with Michael Morpurgo and Olivia Colman. Isata Kanneh-Mason (piano), Braimah Kanneh-Mason (violin), Ayla Sahin (violin), Timothy Ridout (viola), Sheku Kanneh-Mason (cello), Toby Hughes (double bass), Jeneba Kanneh-Mason (piano). DECCA. Released 6 Nov 2020.

French Works for Flute – Franck, Saint‐Saëns, Widor, Duruflé; Adam Walker (flute), James Baillieu (piano), Timothy Ridout (viola). Chandos. Released 2 April 2021.

Schubert – Octet In F Major. Wigmore Soloists. Isabelle van Keulen (violin), Benjamin Gilmore (violin); Timothy Ridout (viola); Kristina Blaumane (cello), Tom Gibbs (double bass), Michael Collins (Clarinet), Robin O’Neill (bassoon), Alberto Menéndez Escribano (French horn). BIS. Released 29 October 2021.

Mendelssohn – The String Quintets. Doric String Quartet, Timothy Ridout (viola). Chandos. Released 25 Feb 2022.

Vaughan Williams – On Wenlock Edge, Four Hymns*, The House of Life. Nicky Spence (tenor), Julius Drake (piano), *Timothy Ridout (viola). Hyperion. Released 1 April 2022.

Berlioz – Harold en Italie (with Les Nuits d'Été). Timothy Ridout (viola), John Nelson conducting the [Orchestre Philharmonique de Strasbourg- Warner (Erato) 2022

Edmund Rubbra – The Jade Mountain, Songs. Claire Barnett-Jones (mezzo-soprano), Iain Burnside (piano), Marcus Farnsworth (baritone), Lucy Crowe (soprano), Timothy Ridout (viola), Catrin Finch (harp). Chandos. Released 3 March 2023.

Mozart – Piano Quartet no.1 in G minor, K478; Piano Quartet no.2 in E flat major, K493. Francesca Dego (violin), Timothy Ridout (viola), Laura van der Heijden (cello), Federico Colli (piano). Chandos. Released 11 August 2023.

French Trios – Claude Debussy: Sonata for Flute, Viola and Harp (L. 137); Prélude à l'après-midi d'un faune (arranged by Wouter Lenaerts); Maurice Ravel: Selections including Sonatine en trio and movements from Ma mère l'oye (arranged for harp, viola, and flute); Louis Vierne: Deux pièces, Op. 5; Jacques Ibert: Deux Interludes for flute, viola and harp. Joseph Jongen: Deux pieces en trio, Op. 80, for flute, viola & harp; Danse lente, Op. 56b. Anneleen Lenaerts (harp), Timothy Ridout (viola) and Adam Walker (flute). Warner Classics. Released 23 October 2026.

Mozart – String Quintets K515 & K516. Takács Quartet and Timothy Ridout. Hyperion. Released 23 October 2026.
