= Andrew Kennedy (tenor) =

British opera singer (born 1977)

Andrew Kennedy (born 26 May 1977) is an English tenor. He was born in Ashington, Northumberland, England, was a chorister at Durham Cathedral, attended Uppingham School, and then was a choral scholar at King's College, Cambridge. Further study at the Royal College of Music was followed by a place on the Vilar Young Artists programme at the Royal Opera House where he performed many solo principal roles.

He won 1st prize at the Jackdaws Vocal Award in 1999 (now called the Maureen Lehane Vocal Awards). He sang for Bampton Classical Opera in 2002. From 2005 to 2007 he was a member of the BBC Radio 3 New Generation Artists scheme. In 2005, he won the Rosenblatt Recital Prize at the BBC Cardiff Singer of the World competition . He is a Borletti-Buitoni Trust Award winner and won the prestigious Royal Philharmonic Society Young Artists' Award in 2006.

Kennedy has sung principal roles in major opera houses of the world including La Scala, Milan, Royal Opera, Royal Opera Covent Garden, Houston Grand Opera, Oper Frankfurt, L'Opéra Comique in Paris, English National Opera, Welsh National Opera and Opera de Lyon. He had an international concert career and worked with some of the world's principal orchestras with conductors such as John Eliot Gardiner, Kazushi Ono, Sir Colin Davis, Gianandrea Noseda, Esa Pekka Salonen, Sir Mark Elder, Sir Roger Norrington, Andris Nelsons and Daniele Gatti. Appearances at the BBC Proms include Finzi Intimations of Immortality (BBCSO/Daniel); Howells Hymnus Paradisi (BBCSO/Brabbins); a live televised performance of Sullivan The Yeomen of the Guard (BBC Concert Orchestra/Jane Glover) and Elgar The Spirit of England at the 2007 Last Night of the BBC Proms with Jiří Bělohlávek.

In September 2019 he became Director of Music at Uppingham School. According to his website, he is still available for short-term concert work.

Since September 2025, Andrew is Head of Singing and Director of Chapel Choir at Oundle School. He is also the musical director of the Oundle and District Choral Society.

== Discography ==
=== CDs ===
- Britten - Saint Nicholas (2013) with Stephen Cleobury, The Choir of King's College, Cambridge, and Britten Sinfonia
- Warlock - The Curlew & songs by Peter Warlock (2006) with Simon Lepper and Pavao Quartet
- Judith Weir - On Buying A Horse (2006) with Susan Bickley (mezzo-soprano), Ailish Tynan (soprano), Iain Burnside (piano)
- Vaughan Williams - On Wenlock Edge (2008) with the Dante Quartet
