= Martin Fröst =

Swedish clarinetist and conductor (born 1970)

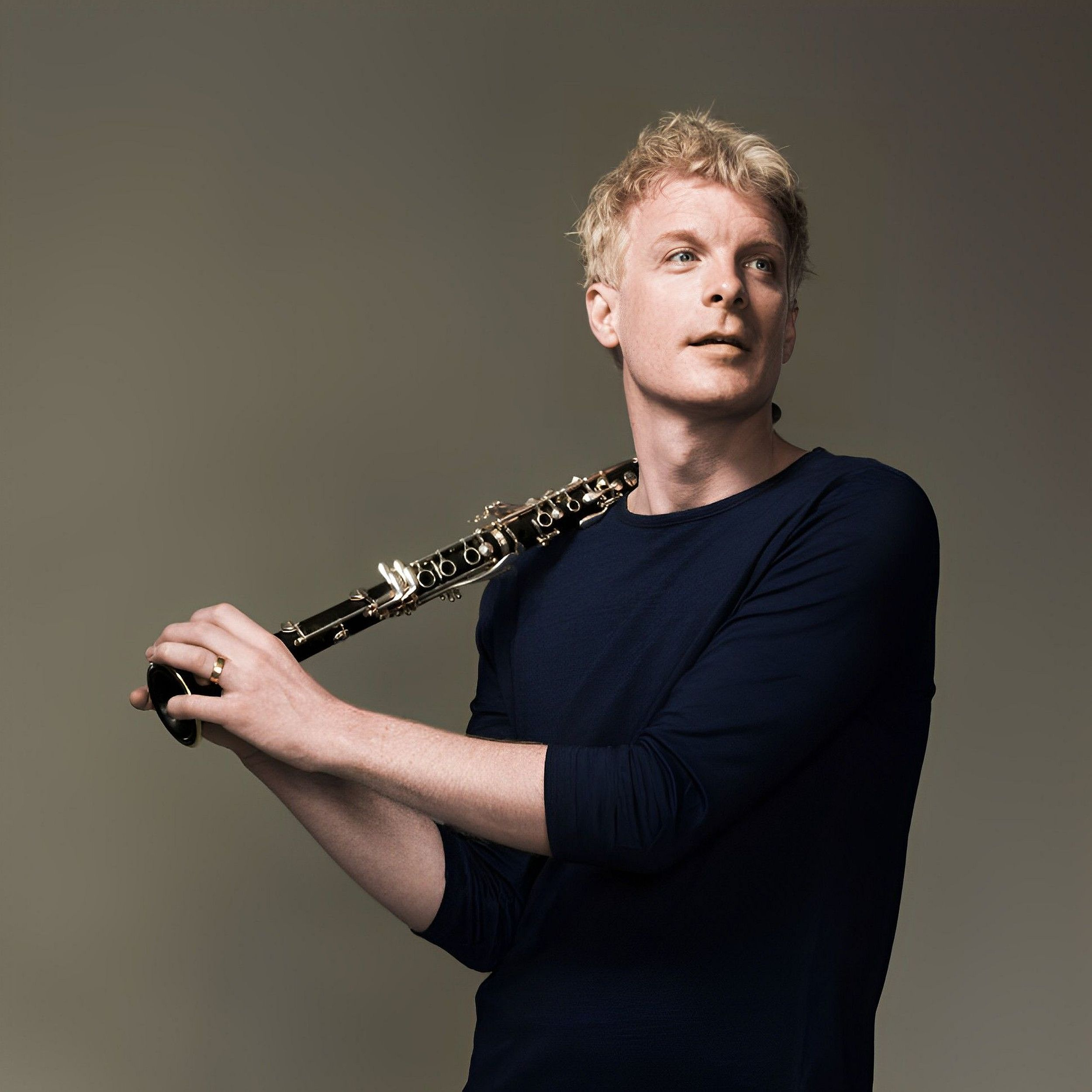

Background information
- Born: 14 December 1970 (age 55); Uppsala, Sweden
- Genres: Classical; chamber; contemporary
- Occupation: Clarinettist
- Instruments: Clarinet and Basset clarinet
- Labels: BIS, Sony
- Website: www.facebook.com/mar.frost/

Martin Fröst (born 14 December 1970) is a Swedish clarinetist and conductor. As a clarinetist, he performs internationally and is considered one of the most renowned instrumental soloists ever.

He is the first clarinetist to be awarded one of classical music's biggest honours, the Léonie Sonning Music Prize. other recipients include Igor Stravinsky, Leonard Bernstein, Miles Davis, Daniel Barenboim and Gidon Kremer. He is also the only wind player ever to have been appointed Artist in Residence with the Amsterdam's Concertgebouworkest (for the 2022/23 season). He was appointed principal conductor of the Swedish Chamber Orchestra in 2019.

Fröst has performed as soloist with most of the leading orchestras of the world, including the New York Philharmonic, Concertgebouworkest, London Symphony Orchestra, Gewandhausorchester Leipzig, Los Angeles Philharmonic, Munich Philharmonic, the Elbphilharmonie Orchestra, NHK Symphony Orchestra, Vienna Symphony, Tonhalle-Orchester Zürich and Orchestre de Paris.

Fröst is also a developer of multimedia projects with music, choreography and light design, in which he appears as a clarinetist, conductor, copywriter and "master of the ceremony". He crosses musical and medial borders.

== Early life and education ==
Fröst was born in Uppsala, Sweden. As a youth, he began musical studies on violin at age 5. At age 9, he started to learn the clarinet. He switched to clarinet after hearing a recording of Jack Brymer playing Mozart's Clarinet Concerto.

Fröst studied with Sölve Kingstedt and Kjell-Inge Stevensson on the Royal College of Music, Stockholm and with Hans Deinzer on the Hanover University of Music, Drama and Media. His first concerto performance was at age 17 with the Swedish Royal Academy of Music Orchestra.

== Career ==
As a clarinettist, Fröst has performed with many orchestras in Europe, the US, Japan, and China. From the 2006–07 to 2008–09 season, he was an artist in the "Junge Wilde" series at the Konzerthaus Dortmund. Regarding his repertoire, Fröst says: "I have actually played just about everything that is right and good for the clarinet." This also includes works by contemporary composers who wrote them especially for him, for example John Adams, Krzysztof Penderecki, Anna Clyne, Anders Hillborg, Kalevi Aho, Rolf Martinsson, Bent Sørensen, Victoria Borisova-Ollas, Karin Rehnqvist and Sven-David Sandström. Conductors he has worked with include Kirill Petrenko, Riccardo Chailly, Esa-Pekka Salonen, Gustavo Dudamel, Alan Gilbert, Paavo Järvi, Klaus Mäkelä, David Zinman, Vladimir Ashkenazy, Lahav Shani, Alain Altinoglu, Nicholas Collon, Maxim Emelyanychev, Jakub Hrusa, Hannu Lintu, Andrew Manze, Gianandrea Noseda, Jonathan Nott, Sakari Oramo, and Osmo Vänska. Chamber music partners include Janine Jansen, Sol Gabetta, Yuja Wang, Quatuor Ebene, Antoine Tamestit, Leif Ove Andsnes, Lucas Debargue, Roland Pöntinen, Nikolaj Szeps-Znaider and Joshua Bell.

His younger brother Göran also writes for him, especially klezmer music. In 1998 Fröst broke new ground with performances of Anders Hillborg's clarinet concerto "Peacock Tales" with elements of mime and dance, a piece he has performed over 300 times worldwide.

Fröst was artistic leader of the Swedish Vinterfest music festival for 10 seasons, concluding his tenure in 2015. He became joint artistic director of the Stavanger International Chamber Music Festival in 2010, and served in that until 2015. He has been a conductor-in-association with the Norrköping Symphony Orchestra, Artistic Partner with Saint Paul Chamber Orchestra and has held multiple residencies at the Wigmore Hall in London.

He was Artist in Residence in the season

- 2018–2019 with the Frankfurt Radio Symphony Orchestra and the Bamberg Symphony Orchestra
- 2019–2020 with the Tonhalle-Orchester Zürich
- 2022–2023 with the Royal Concertgebouw Orchestra Amsterdam.
- 2023–2024 with the Orchestre de la Suisse Romande

On 5 January 2023 the Royal Concertgebouw Orchestra hosted the world premiere of the clarinet concerto Weathered, by the British composer Anna Clyne, who lives in the United States, with Fröst as soloist, performance time: 27 minutes.

In the 2025–2026 season, Fröst will be Artist in Residence with the NDR Elbphilharmonie Orchester.

== Albums ==
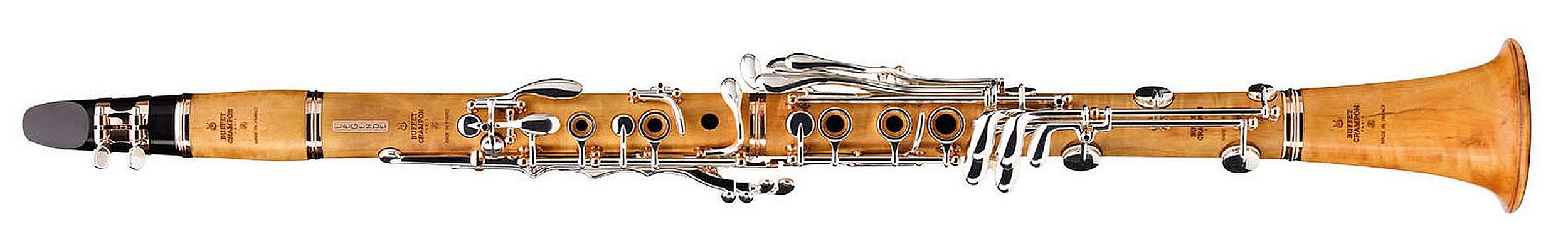
On this vintage boxwood clarinet in B♭ by Buffet Crampon, Fröst plays Vivaldi

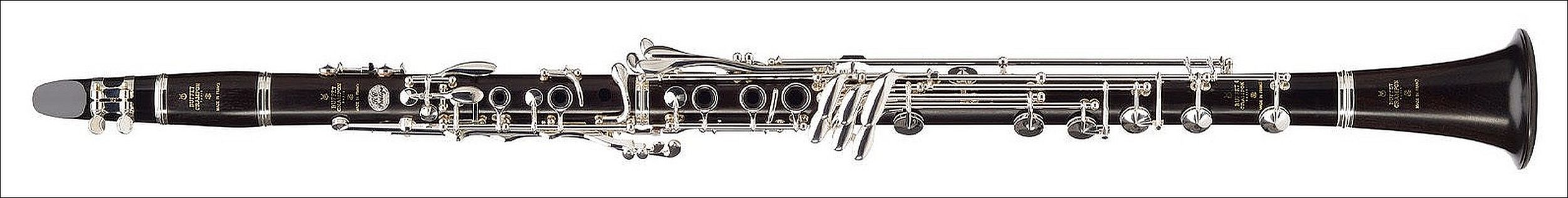
... and on this Prestige basset clarinet in A, which is about 23 cm longer, the Concerto KV 622 by Mozart

- Penderecki (CD-652, 1994)
- French Beauties and Swedish Beasts (CD-693, 1994)
- Close Up (CD-744, 1997)
- 'Hekas! – Östgöta Symphonic Wind Ensemble (CD-818, 1997)
- Clarinet Concertos dedicated to Benny Goodman (CD-893, 1998)
- The Pied Piper of the Opera – Opera paraphrases on the clarinet (CD-1053, 2000)
- James MacMillan – The Confession of Isobel Gowdie (CD-1169, 2002)
- Mozart – Clarinet Concerto & Quintet (SACD 1283, 2003)
- Schumann – Works for Clarinet & Piano (CD-944, 2003)
- Vagn Holmboe – Concertos for Piano, Clarinet and Oboe; Beatus Parvo (CD-1176, 2004)
- Brahms – Clarinet Sonatas & Trio (SACD-1353, 2005)
- Karin Rehnqvist – Arktis Arktis! (CD-1396, 2005)
- Carl Maria von Weber – Clarinet Concertos (SACD-1523, 2006)
- Carl Nielsen & Kalevi Aho Clarinet Concertos (SACD-1463, 2007)
- Christopher Rouse – Orchestral Music (CD-1386, 2008)
- Bernhard Crusell – The Three Clarinet Concertos (SACD-1723, 2008)
- Fröst & Friends (SACD-1823, 2010)
- Martin Fröst – Dances to a Black Pipe (SACD-1863, 2011)
- Martin Fröst – Plays Mozart (SACD-1893, 2013)
- Martin Fröst – Roots (Sony, 2016)
- Martin Fröst, Lucas Debargue, Janine Jansen & Torleif Thedeen, Messiaen: Quatuor pour la fin du temps (Quartet for the End of Time) (Sony, 2019)
- Martin Fröst & Concerto Köln – Vivaldi (Sony, 2020)
- Martin Fröst & Friends – Night Passages (Sony 2022)
- Martin Fröst & Friends, B.A.C.H. (Sony Cassical, October 2025)

== Awards ==
- 1st Prize Geneva Competition (1997)
- Nippon Music Award (1997) for the recording of the clarinet concerto by Carl Nielsen
- Borletti-Buitoni Trust Award 2003
- BBC Radio 3 New Generation Artist (2003–2005)
- Litteris et Artibus (2012)
- Léonie Sonning Music Prize (2014)
- ECHO Klassik Instrumentalist of the Year Award in the category clarinet, for the CD "Roots" (2016)
- Opus Klassik (2021), Instrumentalist of the Year Award in the category clarinet, for the CD "Vivaldi" (2019/2020)
- Culture Prize 2026 of the Swedish publishing foundation Natur & Kultur for his renewal of the expression of classical music, his groundbreaking artistry, artistic courage, and commitment to music education.

== Projects ==
Every two to three years since 2013 Fröst has staged a project in which he works as clarinettist, conductor, lyricist, "master of ceremony", actor and occasionally as a dancer. He performs in collaboration with the Royal Stockholm Philharmonic Orchestra, composers, choreographers and lighting technicians. The projects presented are named Dollhouse, Genesis, Retropia and Xodus.

=== Dollhouse (2013) ===
At Dollhouse, compositions by Göran Fröst, Paul Dukas, Bent Sörensen, Manuel de Falla and Anders Hillborg, as well as choreography and light, became one unit. It was Fröst's first collaboration with the lighting designer and choreographer Linus Fellbom. The world premiere was in October 2013 with a duration of approx. 1:35 h.

The artist says on his website: "Dollhouse is very much about liberation, both in its physical and symbolical form, about the invisible threads that hold us to the earth, tie us together and can wear away. It is a concert with movement as its center, a metaphor in the footsteps of Petrushka and Pinocchio."

=== Genesis (2015) ===
Genesis is a program of works from a millennium of music history, starting with Greek music of the 2nd century (Mesomedes) to compositions by Hildegard von Bingen, Telemann, Piazzolla, Messiaen, Lutoslawski and Hillborg, to name a few. In between folk music by Bartók and klezmer dances by Goran Fröst. Old and new music and music from all over the world are combined. "Its all connected, and the music also reflects people", says Fröst.

The performance lasts ~1:42 h.

=== Retropia (2018) ===
Retropia, Retro and Utopia, looking back, but also designing future forms of music. In the retrospect, we hear the overture to Mozart's Marriage of Figaro, followed by Beethoven's Fourth Symphony. The present of music depicts: Exodus: Departure for solo clarinet (premiere) by the Russian born composer Victoria Borisova-Ollas, who lives in Sweden, Angelus novus for chamber orchestra by the Swedish composer Jacob Mühlrad and Nomadia for clarinet and chamber orchestra by Göran and Martin Fröst, while the future is hinted at in Emerge for clarinet, orchestra and gestrument by Jesper Nordin. Motion sensors on the clarinet ensure that every movement Fröst is converted into music. "In Emerge me and Martin have been trying to find the future of music, blend technology through my technology gestrument – gesture-instrument – where you can play on a virtual orchestra while playing on his clarinet and conducting the live orchestra and to find new ways of expression," says Nordin.

Fröst: "The piece provides a gestrument, it is called 'Space in the Air' and contains music DNA. When I touch the air, it turns into sound, created by an infrared camera. I can play with my fingers in the air, for which I need a choreographer for the movements. And that, too, is a kind of future for music. At the beginning of the piece I say, where does the music go? Can I feel it? Is it going to the future? Can I touch her? And then I literally put my hand in the air between me and the audience and suddenly there is a sound. So it is a conversation between me, the gestrument, the room and the orchestra behind me. It's actually pretty exciting."

The premiere was on 18 May 2018 in Stockholm. The performance lasts approx. 1:45 hours with the addition of the Klezmer dance No. 2 for clarinet and string orchestra by Göran Fröst.

=== Xodus (2022) ===
A year late due to the pandemic, the project, originally Exodus, came on stage under the name "XODUS (The Way Out Lies Within)" on 5 May 2022 at Stockholm's Konserthuset with the participation of more than 100 people and live painting on a large screen, performance time about 75 minutes. Texts with English subtitles and live images are by the multi-artist Jesper Waldersten, very well known in Sweden. Fröst performed as a clarinetist, conductor of the Royal Stockholm Philharmonic Orchestra and a chamber choir, and again as "master of ceremonies." Konserthuset has posted a video of the performance online, as well as a brief introduction indicating all the music titles arranged for this work. These include compositions by Johann Sebastian Bach, George Frideric Handel, Wolfgang Amadeus Mozart, Johannes Brahms, Giuseppe Verdi and Béla Bartók on the one hand, on the other hand, contemporary pieces by the Swedish composers Hans Ek, Anders Hillborg, Goran Fröst, Annamaria Kowalsky, as well as an arrangement of traditional pieces by the Spanish clarinettist and arranger Alberto Álvarez García. The Swedish lighting designer Linus Fellbom, who works mainly in theater, opera and dance, provided lighting design and direction.

One review says: "Musician Martin Fröst and artist Jesper Waldersten push the boundaries of what a classical concert can be."

== Martin Fröst Foundation ==
In 2019, Fröst set up a foundation whose goal is to give children and young people in Sweden and other countries the opportunity to receive music lessons and access to instruments.

== Personal life ==
Fröst lives in Stockholm, Sweden with his wife Karin (née Berglund) and 2 children.

Cultural offices
Preceded by Thomas Dausgaard	Principal Conductor, Swedish Chamber Orchestra; 2019–present	Succeeded by incumbent
