= Fantasy on Themes from Mozart's Figaro and Don Giovanni =

Unfinished operatic paraphrase for piano by Franz Liszt

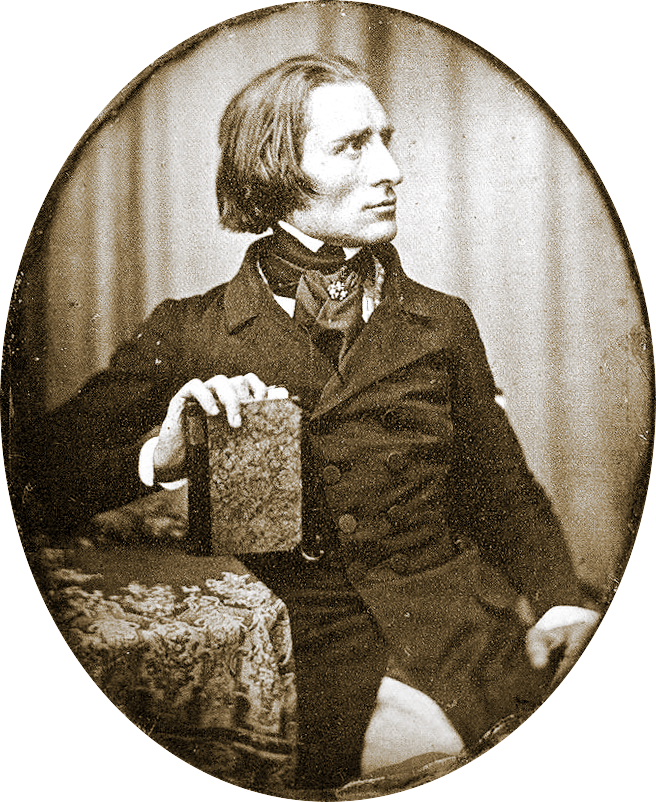
Liszt in 1843, around the time of the piece's conception.

The Fantasy on Themes from Mozart's Figaro and Don Giovanni (German: Fantasie über Themen aus Mozarts Figaro und Don Giovanni), S.697, is an operatic paraphrase for solo piano by Franz Liszt, based on themes from two different Mozart's operas: The Marriage of Figaro, K.492 and Don Giovanni, K.527.

Liszt composed the work by the end of 1842 or early 1843, as he performed it at the latest in Berlin on 11 January 1843, when Mozart would have been 86, had he lived. Left as an unfinished manuscript upon Liszt's death, it was both completed and recorded by the pianist Leslie Howard in 1993 and published in 1997. Earlier, Ferruccio Busoni had published a much shorter performing version, the Fantasy on Two Motives from W. A. Mozart's The Marriage of Figaro, in 1912. Busoni's version, which does not include the music based on Don Giovanni, is often nicknamed the "Figaro Fantasy".

A typical performance lasts approximately thirteen minutes for Busoni's completion and over twenty minutes for Howard's later reconstruction.

Cover page of Leslie Howard's completion.

== Manuscript ==
Liszt's autograph manuscript for the nearly completed work is currently housed at the Stiftung Weimarer Klassik/Goethe- und Schiller-Archiv, Weimar (shelf mark GSA 60/I 45). There is no title, date or place of composition, or signature on the manuscript, which consists of 50 unnumbered pages of music. Much of the music is based on two arias from the opera The Marriage of Figaro: Figaro's "Non più andrai" (Act I) and Cherubino's "Voi che sapete" (Act II). Fifteen pages are devoted to the dance scene from the Act I finale of Don Giovanni. Howard writes:

The manuscript shows his method of composition of such a fantasy quite clearly: the broad outlines, such as the new themes or sections, are commenced on new pages, and space is left to concoct transition material. The introduction, the two pieces from Figaro, the Don Giovanni minuet and the coda are each in self-contained parts of the manuscript. On several occasions Liszt has marked some repeated figures for possible excision by placing the fragments in brackets with a question mark over them. These tiny tightenings of the structure add up to just a few bars [...] The penultimate section breaks off in the middle of some transitional material which does not join happily to the coda.

Liszt's incomplete manuscript contains no title, no tempo indications, and very few dynamics and articulation marks. The ending is some few bars from complete, and there is another lacuna towards the return of the Figaro theme. Liszt probably tried out an improvised solution in performance, judging by the rather insignificant gaps.

== Version by Busoni ==
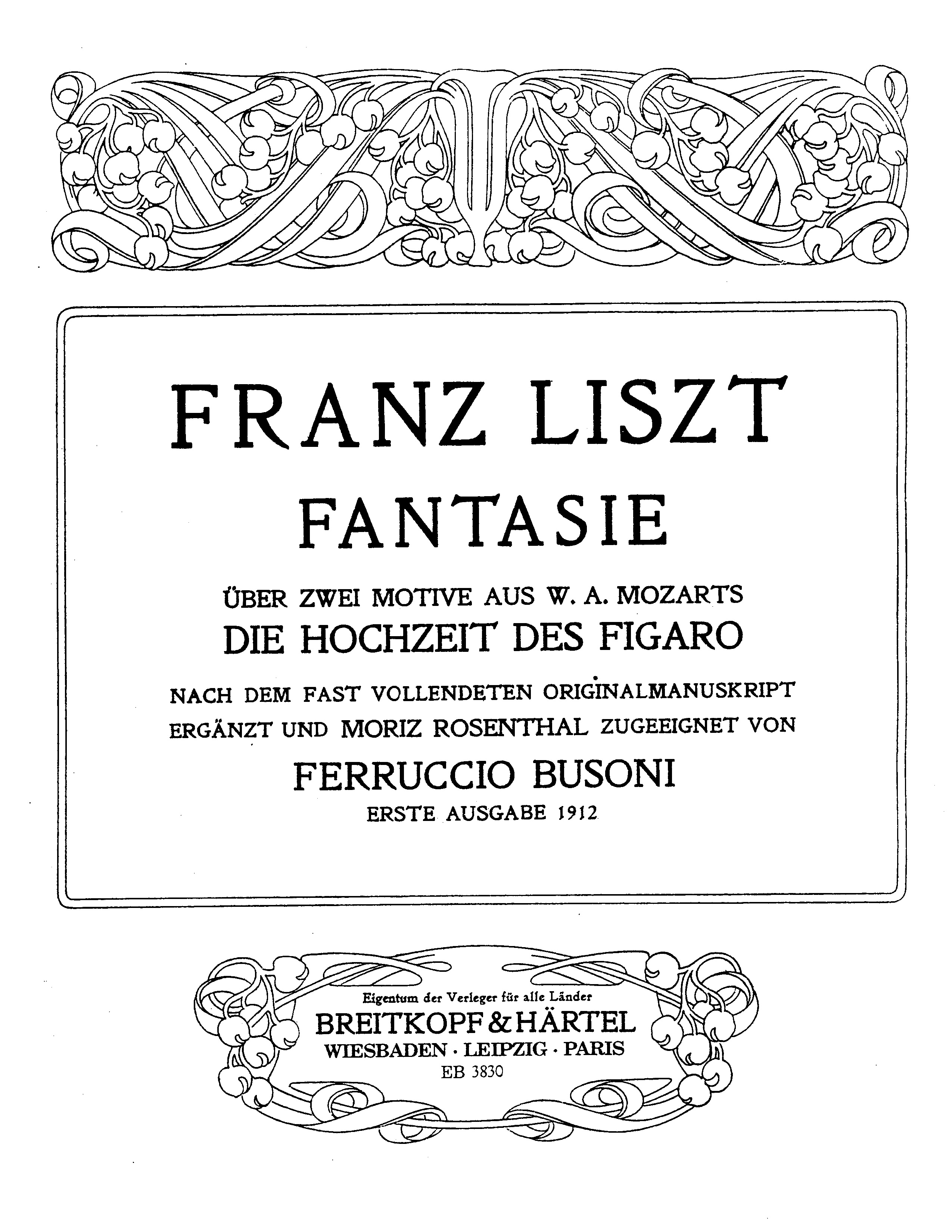
Title page of Busoni's version.

At some point, the pianist-composer Ferruccio Busoni, who has been described as "probably the most open and enthusiastic Liszt exponent in the early twentieth century," became aware of the unpublished manuscript and prepared a performing version which he first played in 1911 in Berlin. Busoni gave a series of six all-Liszt recitals in mid-October of that year, playing nearly all of the major piano works, and these are the concerts at which his version, the "Figaro Fantasy", most likely received its first performance. (Busoni had been on tour in the United States for the first three months of the year, and these were his first piano recitals after returning to Europe in April.)

Later, in the summer of 1912, after the unsuccessful premiere of his Wagnerian-length opera Die Brautwahl in mid-April and a concert tour through Italy in May, Busoni decided to stay home alone in Berlin to work, while his wife Gerda was in Switzerland on holiday. It was during this period of time that he prepared his version of Liszt's "Fantasy" for publication. The manuscript (No. 245 in the Busoni Archive) is dated 11 July 1912. It was published that same year by Breitkopf & Härtel as Fantasie über zwei Motive aus W. A. Mozarts Die Hochzeit des Figaro [Fantasy on two motives from W. A. Mozart's The Marriage of Figaro] (BV B 66).

As the title suggests, Busoni did not include the music from Don Giovanni, shortening the currently known manuscript of more than 597 bars by 245 bars. The changes also included Busoni's 16-bar completion, as well as 10 additional bars on page 28, and other elaborations of 5, 1 and 4 bars duration, including expression marks, cadenzas, and ossias. Unfortunately, no editorial notes were included, so there was little or no indication of his alterations or pages omitted. That summer Busoni also arranged and composed music for the edizione minore of the Fantasia contrappuntistica, the Sonatina Seconda for piano, and incidental music for Frank Wedekind's play Franziska, consisting of sketches for twelve numbers which he never finished. He also shortened and modified the music of Die Brautwahl for a new production and extensively rearranged the music into a suite for concert performance. There is no mention of, nor was there much time available for a trip to Weimar to re-examine Liszt's manuscript, and it is now clear that his version was never intended to be a scholarly edition of Liszt's piece.

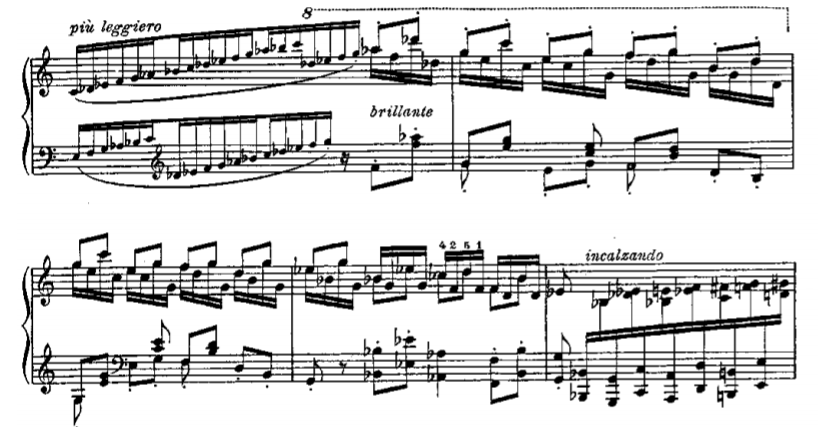
Busoni's completion towards the coda, requiring great dexterity to perform.

Kenneth Hamilton, in his review of Howard's later edition, notes that "for reasons of personal psychology that we can only guess at, [Busoni] chose to give the impression in his preface that he had expanded, rather than drastically cut, Liszt's manuscript." By contrast, the Busoni scholar Larry Sitsky maintains that it is not certain that Liszt intended to perform the music from the two operas together. Instead, since the manuscript pages are unnumbered, it is possible that pages from two separate works were at some point in time placed together in the Weimar holdings. "Since the transition to and from the Don Giovanni music is in C major, the 15 pages of manuscript can be played or omitted without any damage to the harmonic scheme. The Don Giovanni paraphrase begins on a fresh page and at no time are motives from both operas seen on the same page of Liszt's manuscript."

== Version by Howard ==
Title page of Howard's edition.

It was not until much later in the twentieth century that anyone compared Busoni's version to the manuscript. In 1991, the Scottish pianist and writer Kenneth Hamilton was the first to publish the results of such a comparison. In The Opera - Fantasias and Transcriptions of Franz Liszt - A Critical Study, he writes:

As the chief weakness of Liszt's Fantasia on Figaro and Don Juan is the introduction of the minuet from Don Juan into the middle of a piece which up to that point seemed to be a fine fantasia on motifs from Figaro alone, Busoni's solution was to cut the Gordian knot entirely and remove the minuet section, despite the fact that he could not excise the third minuet theme from the coda. By this means the piece gained greater structural coherence, although some fine music was inevitably lost. In addition to suggesting dynamic markings and marks of articulation, Busoni filled out some bars of the introduction (bars 28-37) by adding chromatic scales and tremolo. There is nothing in this which conflicts stylistically with Liszt's music, but the greater elaboration does tend to reduce the improvisatory effect important to this section. Soon after (bars 48 ff.), Busoni altered Liszt's figuration for what seems like no good reason other than his personal fancy [...] The task of providing a suitable transition between the variations of "Non più andrai" and the coda was carried out most dexterously by Busoni, as was his completion of the ending. Indeed, the unobtrusiveness of Busoni's hand to someone unfamiliar with the manuscript version is probably the main reason that most scholars took Busoni's title page at face value. There is no reason why both Busoni's and Liszt's original version of the fantasia should not find favour with pianists and audiences, the more satisfying structure of the one being offset by the fascinating minuet transcription of the other...

Later, after learning of Hamilton's findings, the Australian-born pianist, and notable scholar of Liszt's music, Leslie Howard, attempted to reconstruct the work as he believed Liszt intended, recording, and in 1997 publishing, the newly-recast work. His intention was to "publish... the whole of Liszt's Fantasy with an authenticity of text, supplying and clearly indicating the few bars... which are necessary to render the work performable."

As reconstructed by Howard, the piece includes the music based on the dance scene from the Act I finale of Don Giovanni. The dramatic opening is based on the music from Figaro: a free paraphrase of "Non più andrai" followed by an arrangement of "Voi che sapete" in A♭ major instead of Mozart's B♭ major. This is the only appearance of Cherubino's music. Figaro's aria returns, initially in its original C major, but is quickly varied both harmonically and pianistically. However, instead of proceeding to Mozart's coda, the aria transitions to the dances from Don Giovanni. In the opera, the dances are a minuet in 3/4, a country dance in 2/4, and a quick waltz in 3/8. Liszt keeps the minuet in F major, and combines it with the country dance in the same key. He does not add the waltz as Mozart does, but treats it separately, eventually combining it with the country dance and, "excellently", a portion of Figaro's aria. A series of modulations follow which combine bits of all four themes. At the final transition, the earlier material from Figaro is reused alongside the theme from the minuet. This leads to the coda, which finishes Figaro's aria and where the manuscript breaks off just before the likely end of the piece.

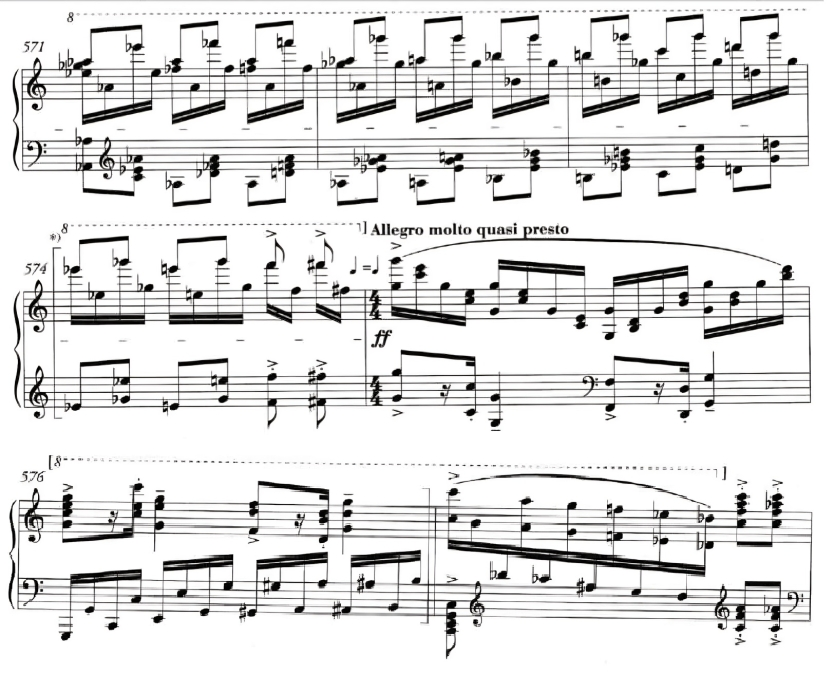
Howard's 3-bar completion towards the piece's coda (inside the square brackets), which incorporates earlier material.

Howard has added a transitional passage of three bars from the Don Giovanni dance music to the final section and the final 15 bars to complete the piece. He has also added expression marks, including "dynamics, marks of articulation, numbers indicating numerical groupings, m.d. and m.s. marks, pedallings, tempo and other textual directions. The evident deficiencies of the manuscript (time signatures, accidentals, stems, beams, rest signs, fermatas) have been tacitly supplied throughout." He uses square brackets to differentiate his additions or suggestions from the original text. The dedication to Monsieur de Gericke Conseille de Legation appears in the left margin on p. 38 in Howard's reconstruction of the work.

The selection and juxtaposition of themes from Figaro and Don Giovanni may have had special significance for Liszt. Howard describes it as follows:

Bearing in mind George Bernard Shaw's perceptive observations upon Liszt's musical interpretation of the morality of the Don in the Don Giovanni Fantasy, it might be similarly if cautiously suggested that the combination and disposition of the themes in the minuet scene in the present work also adumbrate a moral fable: that the flirtatiousness of Cherubino which may seem harmless enough at the beginning could be leading to the unforgivable behaviour of a Don Giovanni, unless good common sense (See Figaro: "Non più andrai...") hinders him from doing so.

The completion was published by Editio Musica Budapest (EMB) in 1997.

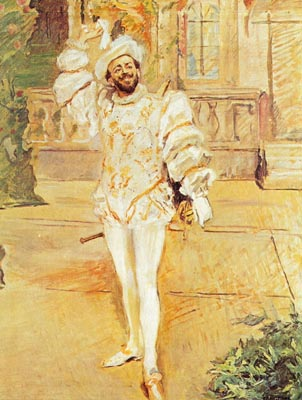
Francisco d'Andrade as Don Giovanni.

== Performances ==
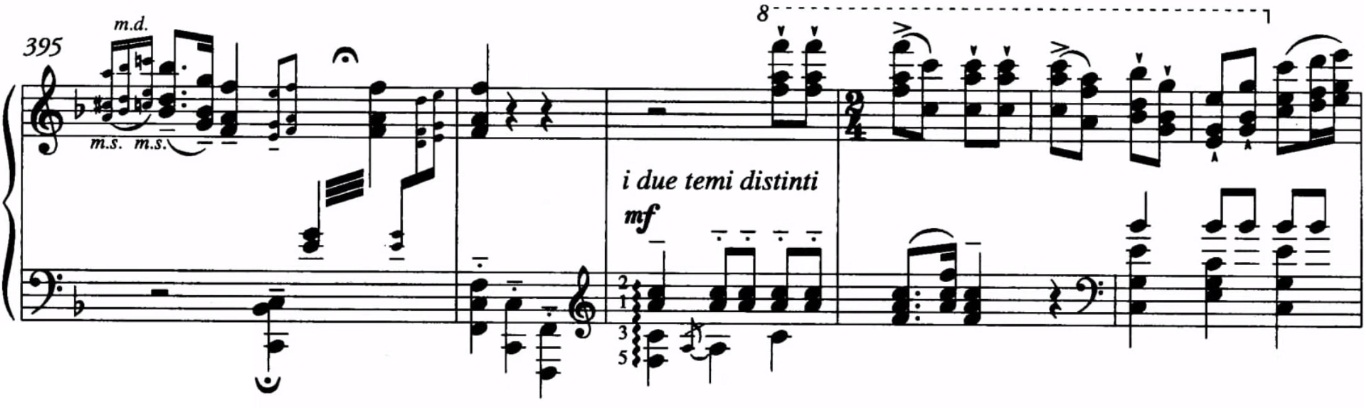
Bar 397 onwards is a notable passage in the fantasy, where Liszt incorporates two previously heard themes at once.

The Fantasy on Themes from Mozart's Figaro and Don Giovanni is very rarely performed in either version, mostly due to its duration (much longer than that of his other showpieces like the Mephisto Waltzes) and the dexterity and technique required for a successful performance.

Nevertheless, the Figaro Fantasy, as prepared by Busoni, was performed extensively by himself, his student Egon Petri, and later championed by the youthful Vladimir Horowitz and Grigory Ginsburg. The Russian pianist Emil Gilels made a famous recording of Busoni's version in 1935. However, it has since fallen out of the standard pianist repertoire. Stephen Hough and Jean-Yves Thibaudet still perform this work occasionally and have both recorded it.

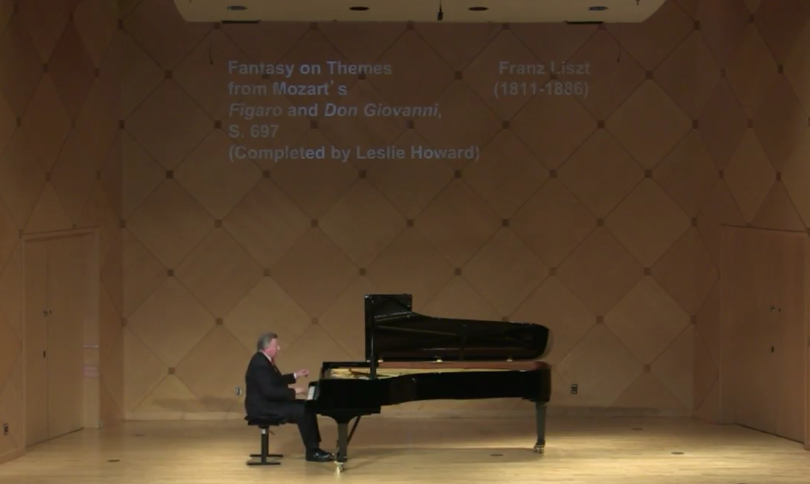
Howard performing his own completion of the fantasy in a 2017 recital.

Leslie Howard recorded his own version in 1993 as a part of his complete piano music recordings of Liszt, and later occasionally included it in his recitals. Mariam Batsashvili, the first prize winner of the 10th International Franz Liszt Piano Competition and the Chinese pianist Chiyan Wong have also made their recordings of Howard's reconstruction.
