= Llŷr Williams =

Welsh pianist (born 1976)

- Born: 1976 (age 49–50); Pentre Bychan, Clwyd, Wales
- Occupation: Concert pianist

Llŷr Williams (born 1976) is a Welsh concert pianist.

== Childhood ==
Williams was born in the village of Pentre Bychan in Wrexham, Wales.

He inherited an interest in opera from his father, and before the age of seven he was attending performances in Llandudno and in Manchester. He started with the operas of Giuseppe Verdi, but by the age of ten he had also developed a taste for those of Richard Wagner.

He began piano lessons at the age of seven. By the age eleven he had passed Grades I-VIII, all with Distinction.

== Education ==
Williams was educated at Ysgol Hooson in Rhosllanerchrugog and Ysgol Morgan Llwyd in Wrexham, and then read music at The Queen's College, Oxford, from 1995 to 1998, finishing with a First-Class degree and being awarded The Gibbs Prize in Music for outstanding performance in his final examinations. He attended the Royal Academy of Music as a postgraduate scholar and studied with Michael Dussek, Iain Ledingham, Hamish Milne, Julius Drake and Irina Zaritskaya. He won every available prize at the Academy and received its highest academic award, the Diploma of the Royal Academy of Music (DipRAM). in 2000. Upon graduating he was elected to a Shinn Fellowship (2000–02), during his tenure of which he studied conducting and coaching singing.

== Awards ==
In May 2002 Williams was selected for representation by the Young Concert Artists Trust. In the same year he won the Critics' Prize at the Edinburgh International Festival. In 2003 he joined the BBC Radio 3 New Generation Artists scheme. In 2004 he received an award of £20,000 from the Borletti-Buitoni Trust, part of which he said he would spend on replacing the mechanics of his piano, which had become worn out through being played for six hours each day. In 2005 he received the Outstanding Young Artist Award from Midem Classique and the International Artist Managers' Association.

In 2009 he was awarded the Glyndŵr Award for an Outstanding Contribution to the Arts in Wales.

In 2018 Williams was made an Honorary Fellow of Wrexham Glyndŵr University for his services to music.

== Recordings ==
Williams appeared on the cover CD of the June 2005 issue of BBC Music Magazine, performing works by Ludwig van Beethoven, Franz Liszt, and Franz Schubert. In 2006 he released his first commercial recording, Chopin's Préludes, on the Quartz label.

His first commercial recording of songs, with Welsh baritone Paul Carey Jones, titled Enaid – Songs of the Soul, was released in November 2007 on the Sain label.

For the Signum Classics label he released a 2010 disc of music inspired by paintings or engravings, with works by Mussorgsky, Debussy and Liszt, and a 2012 disc of works by Liszt. For Ty Cerdd Records he has recorded sets of bagatelles by Daniel Jones and Béla Bartók, released in 2013, and the Piano Concerto No. 2 by William Mathias, released in 2017.

More recently for Signum Classics he has released albums of solo piano music by Richard Wagner in 2014, the complete piano sonatas by Beethoven in 2018, and an eight-CD compendium of music by Schubert in 2020.

== Concert engagements ==
Early in 2007 Williams performed at 11 venues in the United States on his tour with the BBC National Orchestra of Wales.

He has performed at the Edinburgh International Festival every year since 2002. In the same year he was appointed an official accompanist for the BBC Cardiff Singer of the World competition, a role he continues to fulfil. He made his Proms début in 2005, playing Schumann's Piano Concerto in A minor, Op. 54 with the BBC Symphony Orchestra conducted by Jiri Belohlavek. Later that year he appeared in the Mozart Birthday Concert at the Queen Elizabeth Hall in aid of the Young Concert Artists Trust and Amnesty International. He has also performed in the Mostly Mozart Festival at the Barbican Arts Centre, the Cheltenham Festival, Amersham Festival, and Gregynog Festival and he has given more than fifty concerts as part of the Live Music Now scheme.

He is at present the Resident Pianist at Y Galeri concert hall in Caernarfon, Gwynedd.

== Media coverage ==
Williams was the subject of a documentary film, Y Pianydd – Llŷr Williams on Sianel Pedwar Cymru (Channel Four Wales) (S4C). He has also appeared on S4C playing Mozart's Piano Concerto No. 21 in C major, K467, Sonata No. 8 in A minor, K310, and Fantasia No. 3 in D minor, K397.

== Other sources ==
- Artists' Biographies: Llŷr Williams, programme for the Mozart Birthday Concert (Queen Elizabeth Hall, Sunday 30 January 2005), p. 10
