= Leonkoro Quartet =

German string quartet. [Revision - see talkpage]

The Leonkoro Quartet is a string quartet, formed in 2019 and based in Berlin, Germany.

In April 2022, the quartet won first prize and no less than 9 of the special prizes at the prestigious Wigmore Hall International String Quartet Competition in London, despite being the youngest quartet competing, with an average age of just 24. They followed this in May by winning the Bordeaux International String Quartet Competition, also winning the Audience Prize. They also won a number of competition prizes prior to these successes. In November 2022, they received the MERITO Award based on quality of public performances over the year.

The ensemble takes its name from the Esperanto words for 'lion' and 'heart'. They were part of the BBC Radio 3 New Generation Artists scheme for 2022-4. Unusually, they performed standing up, apart from the cellist, until their change of personnel in 2025.

Their first recording, of String Quartets by Ravel and Schumann (No. 3 in A major, Op. 41 No. 3), was released in 2023.

On 30 January 2026, they released Out of Vienna, which examines "early-20th-century Viennese modernism"; it was named an editor's choice by Gramophone Magazine.

== Members ==
The members are:

- Jonathan Schwarz, first violin;
- Emiri Kakiuchi, second violin;
- Mayu Konoe, viola;
- Lukas Schwarz, violoncello.

Until 2025, Amelie Wallner was the second violinist.
