= Harold en Italie =

Symphony with viola obbligato composed by Hector Berlioz

- Symphony with viola solo by Hector Berlioz
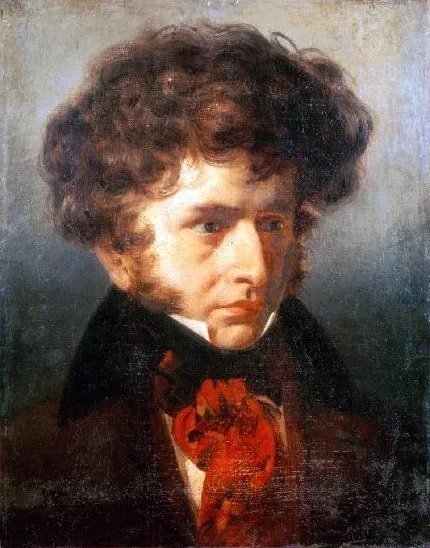
- Portrait of Berlioz, 1832
- English: Harold in Italy
- Catalogue: H. 16
- Opus: 16
- Based on: Lord Byron's "Childe Harold's Pilgrimage"
- Performed: 23 November 1834
- Movements: four
- Scoring: viola; orchestra

Harold en Italie, symphonie avec un alto principal (Harold in Italy, symphony with viola obbligato), as the manuscript describes it, is a four-movement orchestral work by Hector Berlioz, his Opus 16, H. 68, written in 1834. Throughout, the unusual viola part represents the titular protagonist, without casting the form as a concerto. The movements have these titles, alluding to a programme:

1. Harold in the mountains
2. March of the pilgrims
3. Serenade of an Abruzzo mountaineer
4. Orgy of bandits

== Creation ==
The Italian composer Niccolò Paganini encouraged Hector Berlioz to write Harold en Italie. The two first met after a concert of Berlioz's works conducted by Narcisse Girard on 22 December 1833, three years after the premiere of Berlioz's Symphonie fantastique. According to Berlioz' Memoires, Paganini had acquired a "superb viola", a Stradivarius (the so-called "Paganini-Mendelssohn") — "But I have no suitable music. Would you like to write a solo for viola? You are the only one I can trust for this task." ("J'ai un alto merveilleux, me dit-il, un instrument admirable de Stradivarius, et je voudrais en jouer en public. Mais je n'ai pas de musique ad hoc. Voulez-vous écrire un solo d'alto? je n'ai confiance qu'en vous pour ce travail.")

Berlioz began "by writing a solo for viola, but one which involved the orchestra in such a way as not to reduce the effectiveness of the orchestral contribution". When Paganini saw the sketch of the allegro movement, with all the rests in the viola part, he told Berlioz it would not do, and that he expected to be playing continuously. They then parted, with Paganini disappointed. A few years later, Paganini was in Paris again and attended a concert including the Symphonie Fantastique and Harold en Italie conducted by Berlioz. After the concert Paganini went to see Berlioz and told him he had never been as touched as by Harold, then kneeled and kissed Berlioz's hand.

Lord Byron's poem "Childe Harold's Pilgrimage" inspired the mood of Harold, Berlioz wrote.

My intention was to write a series of orchestral scenes, in which the solo viola would be involved as a more or less active participant while retaining its own character. By placing it among the poetic memories formed from my wanderings in the Abruzzi, I wanted to make the viola a kind of melancholy dreamer in the manner of Byron's Childe-Harold.

— Hector Berlioz, "Harold in Italy", Memoirs

That he had recycled some of the material from his discarded concert overture Rob Roy went unmentioned. Despite Berlioz' mention of Byron, music critics, including Donald Tovey, have pointed out that Harold in Italy owes nearly nothing to the poem: "no definite elements of Byron's poem have penetrated the impregnable fortress of Berlioz's encyclopaedic inattention,...there is no trace in Berlioz's music of any of the famous passages of Childe Harold."

== Form ==
I. "Harold in the Mountains": theme of the adagio

I. "Harold in the Mountains": theme of the allegro

II. "March of the Pilgrims": theme

III. "Sérénade": theme of the allegro assai

III. "Sérénade": theme of the allegretto

IV. "At the Orgy of the Brigands": theme

From a formal point of view, the work can be regarded as a symphony. For example, it has four movements, the third of which is a Beethovenesque scherzo. The solo parts never have a virtuoso style comparable to other solo concertos. The viola has its most important role in the first movement, where it introduces the Harold theme as well as the two secondary themes.

In addition to the solo viola, the work calls for 2 flutes (2nd doubling piccolo), 2 oboes (1st doubling cor anglais in movement III), 2 clarinets in C (movements I, III, and IV) and A (movement II), 4 bassoons, 4 horns, 2 cornets, 2 trumpets, 3 trombones, tuba, timpani, cymbals, triangle, 2 tambourines, harp and strings.

Throughout the work the viola represents Harold. The first movement, Harold aux montagnes, traces scenes his melancholic character encounters in the mountains. The manner in which the viola theme hesitantly repeats its opening phrase — gaining confidence, like an idea forming, before the long melody spills out in its entirety — was satirized in a musical paper after the premiere: "Ha! ha! ha! – haro! haro! Harold!" it began, a cheeky touch Berlioz recalled years later in his Mémoires. In the second movement, Marche des pèlerins, Harold accompanies a group of pilgrims; in the third, Sérénade, his mistress is enchanted by music. The last movement, Orgie de brigands, finds the hero spiritually drained and in wild company, perhaps in a tavern. (Jacques Barzun reminds us: "The brigand of Berlioz's time is the avenger of social injustice, the rebel against the city, who resorts to nature for healing the wounds of social man.")

== History ==
Harold in Italy was premiered on 23 November 1834 with the Orchestre de la Société des Concerts du Conservatoire, Chrétien Urhan playing the viola part, Narcisse Girard conducting. Even though the second movement "March of the Pilgrims" received an encore, this performance contributed to Berlioz's decision to conduct his own music in the future.

Paganini did not hear the work he had commissioned until 16 December 1838; then he was so overwhelmed by it that, following the performance, he dragged Berlioz onto the stage and there knelt and kissed his hand before a wildly cheering audience and applauding musicians. A few days later he sent Berlioz a letter of congratulations, enclosing a bank draft for 20,000 francs.

Franz Liszt prepared a piano transcription (with viola accompaniment) of the work in 1836 (S.472).

Notable performances

- 1842, 1 February, Paris, Salle Vivienne – Jean-Delphin Alard (soloist); Berlioz (conductor)
- 1842, 26 September, Brussels – Heinrich Wilhelm Ernst (soloist); Berlioz (conductor)
- 1847, 5 May, Saint Petersburg premiere – Heinrich Wilhelm Ernst (soloist); Berlioz (conductor)
- 1848, 7 February, London premiere – Henry Hill (1808–1846) (soloist); Berlioz (conductor); Drury Lane Theatre
- 1853, 22 November, Bremen – Joseph Joachim (soloist); Berlioz (conductor)
- 1853, 1 December, Leipzig – Ferdinand David (soloist); Berlioz (conductor); Gewandhaus Orchestra
- 1868, 11 January, Moscow – Ferdinand Laub (soloist); Berlioz (conductor); Moscow Conservatory Orchestra
- 1868, 8 February, Saint Petersburg – Hieronymus Weickmann (soloist); Berlioz (conductor); final performance under the direction of the composer
- 1937, 4 February – Lionel Tertis (soloist, his last public performance); Ernest Ansermet; BBC Symphony Orchestra

The first studio recording was made by RCA in 1944 with William Primrose and the Boston Symphony Orchestra conducted by Serge Koussevitzky.

The piece was used in Terrence Malick's 2013 film To The Wonder, starring Ben Affleck and Olga Kurylenko. The film has several visual references to the composition's content and history.

== Recordings ==
Harold en Italie has been frequently recorded.

- William Primrose, NBC Symphony Orchestra, Arturo Toscanini, 2 January 1939 live broadcast
- William Primrose, Boston Symphony Orchestra, Serge Koussevitzky, 1944
- Gunther Breitenbach, Vienna Symphony, Rudolf Moralt, 1950
- William Primrose, Royal Philharmonic Orchestra, Thomas Beecham, 1952
- Carlton Cooley, NBC Symphony Orchestra, Arturo Toscanini, 1953
- Frederick Riddle, London Philharmonic Orchestra, Hermann Scherchen, 1953
- Joseph de Pasquale, Boston Symphony Orchestra, Charles Munch, 1954
- Ladislav Cerny, Czech Philharmonic, Vaclav Jiracek, 1955
- Frederick Riddle, Royal Philharmonic Orchestra, Sir Thomas Beecham, 1956
- Heinz Kirchner, Berlin Philharmonic, Igor Markevitch, 1957
- William Primrose, Boston Symphony Orchestra, Charles Munch, 1958
- William Lincer, New York Philharmonic, Leonard Bernstein, 1961
- Yehudi Menuhin, Philharmonia Orchestra, Colin Davis, 1963
- Klaas Boon, Royal Concertgebouw Orchestra, Pierre Monteux, 1963
- Georg Schmid, Bavarian Radio Symphony Orchestra, Rafael Kubelík, 1964
- Rudolf Barshai, Moscow Philharmonic Orchestra, David Oistrakh, 1964
- Walter Trampler, London Symphony Orchestra, Georges Prêtre, 1969
- Joseph de Pasquale, Philadelphia Orchestra, Eugene Ormandy, 1970
- Claude Ducrocq, Orchestre philharmonique de Strasbourg, Alain Lombard, 1974
- Nobuko Imai, London Symphony Orchestra, Colin Davis, 1975
- Daniel Benyamini, Israel Philharmonic Orchestra, Zubin Mehta, 1975
- Joseph Suk, Czech Philharmonic, Dietrich Fischer-Dieskau, 1976
- Donald McInnes, Orchestre National de France, Leonard Bernstein, 1977
- Pinchas Zukerman, Orchestre de Paris, Daniel Barenboim, 1977
- Robert Vernon, Cleveland Orchestra, Lorin Maazel, 1977
- Yuri Bashmet, USSR State Radio and Television Symphony Orchestra, Vladimir Fedoseyev, 1981
- Lubomir Jaly, Czech Philharmonic, František Jílek, 1981
- Milan Telecky, Slovak Radio Symphony Orchestra, Onderj Lenard, 1982
- Wolfram Christ, Berlin Philharmonic, Lorin Maazel, 1985
- Douglas McNabney, Orchestre Symphonique de Québec, Simon Streatfield, 1985
- Pinchas Zukerman, Montreal Symphony Orchestra, Charles Dutoit, 1988
- Yuri Bashmet, Frankfurt Radio Symphony, Eliahu Inbal, 1989
- Gérard Caussé, Orchestre du Capitole de Toulouse, Michel Plasson, 1991
- Gérard Caussé, Orchestre Révolutionnaire et Romantique, John Eliot Gardiner, 1994
- Laurent Verney, Orchestre de l'Opéra Bastille, Myung-whun Chung, 1996
- Bruno Pasquier, Orchestre Philharmonique Regional Montpellier, Cyril Diederich, 1996
- Bruno Giuranna, BBC Symphony Orchestra, Maxim Shostakovich, 1996
- Rivka Golani, San Diego Symphony, Yoav Talmi, 1996
- Gérard Caussé, Orchestra del Teatro La Fenice, Jean Fournet, 1997
- Mikhail Tolpygo, USSR State Academic Symphony Orchestra, David Oistrakh, 1997
- Csaba Erdélyi, New Zealand Symphony Orchestra, Marc Taddei, 2001
- Tabea Zimmermann, London Symphony Orchestra, Colin Davis, 2003
- Naoko Shimizu, Sendai Philharmonic Orchestra, Kazuhiro Koizumi, 2007
- Jean-Eric Soucy, Southwest German Radio Symphony Orchestra, Sylvain Cambreling, 2009
- Antoine Tamestit, Les Musiciens du Louvre, Marc Minkowski, 2011
- Stefano Passaggio, Zagreb Philharmonic Orchestra, Milan Horvat, 2011
- David Aaron Carpenter, Helsinki Philharmonic Orchestra, Vladimir Ashkenazy, 2011
- James Ehnes, Melbourne Symphony Orchestra, Sir Andrew Davis, 2014
- Antoine Tamestit, hr-Sinfonieorchester, Eliahu Inbal, 2018
- Timothy Ridout, Orchestre Philarmonique de Strasbourg, conducted by John Nelson CD Erato 2022

== Bibliography ==
- Berlioz, Hector. Memoirs. ch. 45
- Berlioz website: Harold in Italy
- Stolba, K Marie (1998). The Development of Western Music. McGraw-Hill Humanities, Social Sciences & World Languages. ISBN 978-0-697-29379-4.
- program notes, 2005 by Richard Freed
- D. Kern Holoman, program notes, 1996
