= Tai Murray =

American violinist

Tai Murray (born 1981 or 1982) is an American violinist.

According to Murray, she became interested in the violin when her parents "put a pencil case with a toy violin in my hand when I was five". Born in Chicago, Illinois, Murray made her concert debut with the Chicago Symphony Orchestra at the age of nine. She studied at Indiana University and the Juilliard School. She was a BBC New Generation Artist from 2008 to 2010.

In 2012, she released a recording of the complete sonatas of Belgian composer Eugène Ysaÿe.
