= Lisa Milne =

Scottish soprano

Lisa Milne (born 22 April 1971 in Aberdeen) is a Scottish soprano described by the BBC as "one of RSAMD's best-known alumni", who was among the first artists to be invited to the BBC Radio 3 New Generation Artists scheme in 1999–2001.

Known for her work as a member of the King's Consort and her recordings with Roger Vignoles, Iain Burnside, Malcolm Martineau, and others. She has performed at the Edinburgh Festival and the BBC Proms.

The Scottish soprano Lisa Milne studied at the Royal Scottish Academy of Music and Drama. She was awarded an MBE in the Queen's Birthday Honours in 2005. She was also awarded honorary doctorates by the University of Aberdeen and Robert Gordon's University. A renowned recitalist, she has appeared at Edinburgh and City of London festivals, London's Wigmore Hall. She is regularly partnered by Malcolm Martineau with whom she has performed and recorded a variety of repertoire.

In opera, her appearances have included Pamina (Die Zauberflöte) and Susanna (Le nozze di Figaro) at the Metropolitan Opera, New York, and Pamina, Marzelline (Fidelio), Micäela (Carmen) and the title roles in Rodelinda and Theodora at the Glyndebourne Festival. Her many roles at the English National Opera have included Contessa (Le nozze di Figaro), the title role in Alcina, and Anne Trulove (The Rake's Progress). At the Welsh National Opera, she created the role of Sian in the world premiere of James MacMillan's opera The Sacrifice.

Highlights have included appearances with the Boston Symphony Orchestra and Levine, the Berlin Philharmonic with Rattle, the Rotterdam Philharmonic Orchestra with Gergiev, the Dresden Staatskapelle with Ticciati, the Seoul Philharmonic Orchestra with Chung, the London Philharmonic Orchestra with Jurowski, the Budapest Festival Orchestra with Fischer and the New York and Vienna Philharmonic Orchestras with Harding. Lisa also sang in concert with Jose Carreras at the reopening of The Usher Hall, Edinburgh with the BBC SSO and again with Carerras at The Royal Albert Hall. She has recorded the songs of Marjory Kennedy Fraser, as well as Vivaldi and Handel with The King's Consort for Hyperion, Idomeneo and La Clemenza di Tito under Mackerras, French Song with Iain Burnside, and Poulenc and Debussy with Martineau.

She also played The Governess in the award-winning BBC film 'Turn of the Screw' by Britten directed by Katie Mitchell (2005 Opus Arte) which won Winner Best Fiction Film – Vienna TV and Micaela on the Glyndebourne DVD of 'Carmen' directed by Sir David MacVicar.

Lisa currently teaches at the Aberdeen City Music School
