= Frédéric Aguessy =

French pianist and conductor (born 1956)

- Born: 3 April 1956 (age 69); Paris, France
- Occupations: Pianist, conductor
- Instrument: Piano
- Website: www.fredericaguessy.fr

Frédéric Aguessy (born 3 April 1956), is a French pianist and conductor.

== Life ==
Born in Paris, Aguessy was admitted to the Paris Conservatoire in 1968, he studied with Monique La Bruchollerie, Yvonne Lefebure, Pierre Barbizet and Geneviève Joy.

He won competitions in Geneva and Naples in 1974, Budapest in 1976. His concert career started after he won the XVIII Long-Thibaud Competition (1979) and second prize at the Paloma O'Shea Santander International Piano Competition (1978).

He has played with many orchestras: Paris Orchestra, Orchestra of the Capitole de Toulouse, National Orchestra of Pays de la Loire, Philharmonic Orchestra of Monte-Carlo, Philharmonic Orchestra G. Enescu, the Regional Orchestra of Cannes-Provence-Alpes-Côte d'Azur, Picardy Sinfonietta Orchestra, Orchestra Bernard Thomas.

He devotes a substantial part of its activities to the chamber music. He participated in many festivals: in Yokohama (Japan), Festival des Arcs, Festival de La Roque-d'Anthéron, International Festival of Montpellier and Radio France, Festival Estival de Paris, Festival of Young Soloists' Antibes. He also is interested in conducting and has conducted works for chamber orchestra and works for chorus and orchestra.

He taught at the Conservatoire National Superieur de Musique of Paris (where one of his students was Cédric Tiberghien), and now teaches at Fontainebleau, and is a professor at the Rouen Conservatory.

French music repertoire is important for him; he has commissioned several works (e.g. "Piano Etudes" Anthony Girard, "Concerto for piano and orchestra" by Max Pinchard).

== Recordings ==
He has also recorded the piano works by Jehan Alain for Disque Lyrinx - Éloge du Piano Français, transcriptions and paraphrases by Franz Liszt for Disque Ligia Digital, the sonatas for violin and piano of Ernest Bloch, with Alexis Galpérine for Disque Accord, and a Mozart Brahms Ravel 'Concert à deux pianos' CD with Cédric Tiberghien.
