= Amatis Trio =

Dutch chamber music group

- Origin: Amsterdam, Netherlands
- Genres: Chamber music piano trio
- Years active: 2015–present
- Website: amatistrio.com

The Amatis Trio is a piano trio formed in 2014 in Amsterdam. It is one of the few full-time piano trios in Europe.

== Career ==
The ensemble was named a BBC New Generation Artist in 2016 and named in the ECHO Rising Stars in 2018 after being selected by Konzerthaus Dortmund, Elbphilharmonie Hamburg, Festspielhaus Baden-Baden and Kölner Philharmonie. In 2019, the trio was appointed Resident Chamber Ensemble at Cambridge University. The Amatis Trio now plays at major festivals such as the BBC Proms, Edingburgh International Festival and concert venues including Konzerthaus Berlin, Wigmore Hall London, Elbphilharmonie Hamburg and Alte Oper Frankfurt. The ensemble has performed Beethoven's Triple Concerto with the Royal Philharmonic Orchestra, BBC National Orchestra of Wales and Frankfurter Opern- und Museumsorchester.

In 2019, following the release of their debut CD of Enescu, Ravel and Britten, the trio was named as Gramophone magazine's "One To Watch".

Lea Hausmann and Samuel Shepherd play on a violin and cello made by Jean-Baptiste Vuillaume, loaned by Beare's Violin Society London.

== Awards ==
- 2015: Dutch Classical Talent
- 2016: Wigmore Hall Parkhouse Award
- 2018: BBC Radio 3 New Generation Artists
- 2019: Het Kersjes Fonds – Kersjesprijs
- 2020: Borletti-Buitoni Trust (BBT) Fellowship Award

== Discography ==
- 2019: Piano trios by Enescu, Ravel and Britten (CAvi Music Records)

== Members ==
- Lea Hausmann (violin)
- Samuel Shepherd (violoncello)
- Mengjie Han (piano)
