= Elena Xanthoudakis =

Australian operatic soprano

Elena Xanthoudakis (born 1978) is an Australian operatic soprano.

== Life and career ==
Xanthoudakis was born in Mount Beauty to Greek father and Australian mother, and raised in Bentleigh. After graduating from McKinnon Secondary College she studied astrophysics in university. In her second year, she gradually turned to music by taking on full-time honours music performance degree at the Victorian College of the Arts. After completing Bachelor of Music with Honours in 2001, she pursued simultaneously Master of Music at the University of Melbourne and Graduate Diploma of Opera at the VCA, receiving both degrees in 2004. She then studied on scholarship at the Guildhall School of Music and Drama, where she received Master of Music degree with distinction in 2005.

She won numerous prizes in native and international competitions. In 2003, she won the Maria Callas International Grand Prix in Athens, and was a finalist in the Australian Singing Competition. In 2005, she won third prize as well as "Best Interpretation of Compulsory Canadian Work Award" in the Montreal International Musical Competition. In 2006, she won first prize in the International Mozart Competition in Salzburg, and second prize in McDonald's Operatic Aria of the McDonald's Performing Arts Challenge. In 2008, she won third prize in Operalia. In 2011, she won a Borletti-Buitoni Trust Award.

== Personal life ==
Xanthoudakis is married to tenor Paul Featherstone.

== Discography ==
- Jewels of the Bel Canto; Richard Bonynge, Royal Northern Sinfonia (2014, Signum Records)
- The Captive Nightingale; Clemens Leske, Jason Xanthoudakis (2016, Signum Records)
