= Francesco Piemontesi =

Swiss pianist (born 1983)

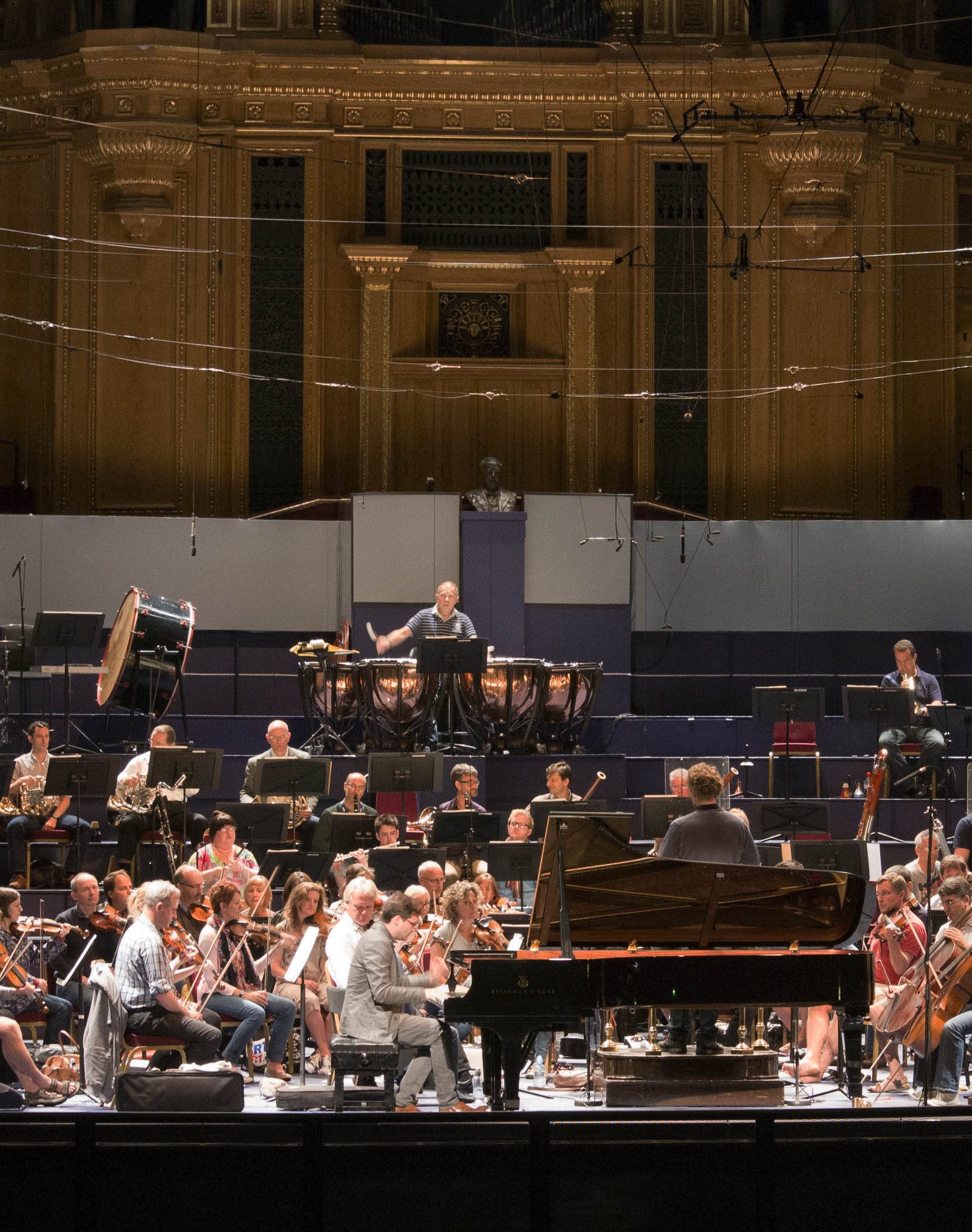
Francesco Piemontesi rehearsing with the BBC National Orchestra of Wales at Royal Albert Hall, London

Francesco Piemontesi is a Swiss pianist.

== Life ==
Born in 1983 in Locarno, he studied at the Hochschule für Musik und Theater Hannover with Arie Vardi before closely collaborating with Alfred Brendel. He rose to international prominence with prizes at several major competitions, including the 2007 Queen Elisabeth Competition in Brussels. In 2009 he was awarded the fellowship of the Borletti-Buitoni Trust. From 2009 to 2011 he was chosen as a BBC New Generation Artist. In 2012, Piemontesi was announced as Artistic Director of the Settimane Musicali music festival in Ascona, and received the BBC Music Magazine Newcomer Award for his Recital disc with works by Haendel, Brahms, Bach and Liszt. From 2012 he recorded exclusively for the French label Naïve Classique. Since 2019 he records for the Pentatone label. He currently lives in Berlin.

Francesco Piemontesi has given concerts with major ensembles worldwide: Cleveland Orchestra, London Philharmonic Orchestra, Bavarian Radio Symphony Orchestra, City of Birmingham Symphony Orchestra, NHK Symphony Orchestra, Gewandhausorchester Leipzig, Orchestre Philharmonique de Radio France, RSB and DSO Berlin. He has performed with such conductors as Zubin Mehta, Roger Norrington, Charles Dutoit, Jiří Bělohlávek, Stanisław Skrowaczewski, Vladimir Ashkenazy, Ton Koopman and Marek Janowski, and has appeared in many international music festivals including the BBC Proms, Edinburgh International Festival, Aix-en-Provence Festival, Mostly Mozart Festival. and Athens Epidaurus Festival at the Herodes Atticus Ancient Theatre of Athens https://aefestival.gr/festival_events/chamber-orchestra-of-europe-konstantinos-karydis-francesco-piemontesi/

== Discography ==
- Brahms: Piano Concerto No. 2 & Three Intermezzi Op. 117, PENTATONE, 2025
- Liszt Transcendental Etudes & Piano Sonata, PENTATONE, 2023
- Schoenberg, Messiaen & Ravel, PENTATONE, 2022
- Schubert: Last Piano Sonatas, PENTATONE, 2019
- Debussy: Preludes, Naïve Records, 2015
- Mozart: Piano works, Naïve Records, 2014
- Schumann | Dvorak: Piano concertos (BBC Symphony Orchestra, Jiří Bělohlávek), Naïve Records 2013
- Frank Martin: Intégrale des Oeuvres pour Flûte (Emmanuel Pahud, Orchestre de la Suisse Romande, Thierry Fischer), Musiques Suisses 2012
- Recital: Händel, Brahms, Bach, Liszt, Avanti classics 2010
- Schumann: Piano works, Claves records 2009
