= Benjamin Grosvenor =

British pianist (born 1992)

- Born: 8 July 1992 (age 33); Westcliff-on-Sea, Southend-on-Sea, Essex, England
- Origin: United Kingdom
- Genres: Classical
- Occupation: Musician
- Instrument: Piano
- Years active: 2003 - present
- Label: Decca
- Website: www.benjamingrosvenor.co.uk

Benjamin Grosvenor (born 8 July 1992) is a British classical pianist.

== Education ==
Grosvenor was born and brought up in Westcliff-on-Sea, Southend-on-Sea, Essex. He is the youngest of five brothers. His father is an English and Drama teacher, and his mother Rebecca is a piano teacher by profession. Grosvenor began studying the piano with his mother at the age of five. He joined Westcliff High School for Boys in 2003. He now also took lessons from Hilary Coates and Christopher Elton in London. Grosvenor studied at the Royal Academy of Music, where he took musicianship classes with Daniel-Ben Pienaar and Julian Perkins. At his graduation as BMus in 2012 he received the Queen's Award for Excellence for the best all-round student of the year.

== Performance career ==
In May 2003, Grosvenor gave his first full recital at a local church playing both the piano and the cello. In the same year, he made his first concert appearance with orchestra performing Mozart's Piano Concerto No. 21 with the Westcliff Sinfonia. He went on to win the keyboard section of the BBC Young Musician in 2004, playing Ravel's Concerto in G in the concerto final. Some of the first concerts he played in were at the Royal Albert Hall, St George's, Bristol, Wigmore Hall, Barbican Centre, Usher Hall, Carnegie Hall and Symphony Hall.

Since then he has developed a high-profile international career. Grosvenor has performed with the London Symphony Orchestra, Orchestre National de France, Boston Symphony, Cleveland Orchestra, National Symphony Orchestra, San Francisco Symphony, New York Philharmonic, Philadelphia Orchestra, Gewandhausorchester, Gürzenich Orchestra, Konzerthausorchester Berlin, Tonhalle-Orchester Zürich, Orchestra dell’Accademia Nazionale di Santa Cecilia, Orquesta Nacional de España, London Philharmonic Orchestra, Royal Philharmonic Orchestra, Bournemouth Symphony Orchestra, Brazilian Symphony Orchestra, Philharmonia Orchestra and English Chamber Orchestra, among many others.

In 2010, Grosvenor joined BBC Radio 3's New Generation Artists scheme, which he completed in 2012. In the summer of 2011, he made his debut at the BBC Proms as the youngest-ever soloist on opening night, playing Liszt's Second Piano Concerto, and Britten's Piano Concerto later in the series with the National Youth Orchestra. He has since played at the Proms numerous times, and in 2015 performed at the Last Night of the festival. Judith Weir composed her solo piano work Day Break Shadows Flee for Grosvenor, who gave its world premiere in September 2014. In 2016, he became the inaugural recipient of The Ronnie and Lawrence Ackman Classical Piano Prize with the New York Philharmonic.

For the 20/21 season, he was announced as Artist-in-Residence at Radio France and also with the Bournemouth Symphony Orchestra.

== Awards ==
At age 10, in 2003, he became the youngest-ever winner of four local and national competitions in the UK: The Southend Young Musician of the Year, The Essex Young Musician of the Year, The Emanuel Trophy and The EPTA Trophy. At age 11, Grosvenor was the winner of the keyboard section of the BBC Young Musician of the Year 2004 award.

In 2011, the Evening Standard selected Grosvenor as one of its "1,000 Most Influential Londoners" and The Daily Telegraph chose him as one of its "Top 10 Britons of the Year".

In 2012, this pianist "at the same time so brilliant and so promising" was awarded two Gramophone Awards: 'Instrumental Award' and 'Young Artist Award' for his debut disc with Decca, making him Gramophone's youngest-ever double award winner. He was also awarded a Classic Brit 'Critics Choice Award' for his Chopin/Liszt/Ravel CD on Decca.

His 2020 recording of the Chopin Piano Concerti won both a Gramophone award in the Concerto category, and a 'Diapason d'Or de l'année' from the French magazine Diapason with Diapason's critic declaring that the recording is “a version to rank among the best, and confirmation of an extraordinary artist.”

== Recordings ==
In July 2005, Grosvenor appeared in the BBC documentary "Being a Concert Pianist" as part of the Imagine series.

Grosvenor has recorded CDs featuring various composers. After a short period under a development agreement with EMI, he signed for Decca in April 2011, the youngest artist ever and the first British pianist in 60 years to sign with the label. He has released five albums on the label. His first, Chopin Liszt Ravel, won the 2012 Gramophone Award for the best instrumental album released in the previous year. Also in 2012, he released Rhapsody in Blue, featuring music by Saint-Saëns, Ravel and Gershwin with the Royal Liverpool Philharmonic Orchestra conducted by James Judd. In 2014, he released Dances (2014), a solo album featuring music in dance forms by composers including Bach, Chopin, Scriabin and Granados. The album was awarded "Disc of the Month" by both the BBC Music Magazine and Gramophone. His 2016 album 'Homages', a mixed recital, received a 'Diapason D'Or' and was 'Instrumental Choice' in BBC Music Magazine. In 2020, he released a recording of the Chopin Piano Concertos with Elim Chan and the Royal Scottish National Orchestra. This received both a Gramophone award and a 'Diapason D'Or de l'année'.

In September 2012, Grosvenor was featured in the CNN series Human to Hero.

In January 2021 it was announced that Grosvenor had re-signed to Decca with the first disc in this new contract being devoted to the music of Liszt.

== Discography ==
- This and That (2009)
- Chopin, Liszt & Ravel (2011)
- Rhapsody in Blue (2012)
- Dances (2014)
- Homages (2016)
- Chopin Piano Concertos (2020)
- Liszt (2021)
- Schumann and Brahms (2023)
- Chopin: Piano Sonatas Nos. 2&3 (2025)
