= Cédric Tiberghien =

French pianist

Cédric Tiberghien (born 5 May 1975) is a French classical pianist.

== Biography ==
Tiberghien started learning to play the piano at age 5 with Michèle Perrier in Noyon, studied at the Conservatoire de Paris with Frédéric Aguessy and Gérard Frémy, where in 1992 he received the first prize at 17.

He was inspired at a young age by pianists like Arthur Rubinstein, whom he considered to be one of the greatest pianists and devotes great admiration to artists like Artur Schnabel in works by Beethoven, Richter, and even more Emil Gilels.

Tiberghien has won several international awards including second prize in Bremen in 1993 and in Dublin in 1994, sixth prize at the 1995 Arthur Rubinstein International Piano Master Competition in Tel-Aviv, and third prize in Geneva in 1996.

In 1998, he won the First Grand Prize and five special prizes at the Long-Thibaud-Crespin Competition.

For Harmonia Mundi he made several solo festival recordings: Debussy's piano works, Beethoven's Eroica Variations, Bach's partitas, ballades by Chopin and Brahms. He also recorded Brahms' Piano Concerto No. 1 with the BBC Symphony Orchestra conducted by Jiří Bělohlávek. With Alina Ibragimova he has recorded the complete violin-piano works by Ravel, Szymanowski and Schubert, and their recordings of Mozart sonatas won a Preis der deutschen Schallplattenkritik.

From 2005 to 2007 Tiberghien was a member of the BBC New Generation Artists scheme.
