= Elizabeth Watts =

Elizabeth Watts (born 1979) is an English operatic soprano.

Watts was born in Norwich and attended Norwich High School for Girls. She studied archaeology at Sheffield University and graduated with first class honours. Beginning in 2002, she studied music at the Royal College of Music with Lillian Watson. She graduated in 2005 with distinction and the Queen Elizabeth the Queen Mother Rose Bowl, awarded annually for outstanding achievement. From 2005 to 2007, she was a member of the Young Singers’ Programme at English National Opera. In the 10/11 season she was Pamina/Die Zauberflöte for Welsh National Opera and Marzelline/Fidelio for the Royal Opera House, Covent Garden.

== Life and career ==
In 2006, Watts won the Kathleen Ferrier Award. She represented England at the 2007 Cardiff Singer of the World Competition, reaching the final and winning the prestigious Rosenblatt Song Prize Competition. She was chosen as a BBC Radio 3 New Generation Artist from 2007 to 2009. In 2011 she won a Borletti-Buitoni Trust Award.

Her earliest US appearances were in Boston with the Handel and Haydn Society of Boston in 2006 and with Cal Performances in San Francisco. She made her debut at Santa Fe Opera in July 2008. Recently Watts sang Mozart Requiem with the Boston Handel & Haydn Society and Harry Christophers which will be released on CD.

Watts’ other recordings include discs of Schubert Lieder and Bach Arias, both of which were chosen as Gramophone Magazine Editor's Choice. She has also released recordings of Thomas Arne's Artaxerxes, Handel's Messiah with the Huddersfield Choral Society and Brahms Requiem with the London Philharmonic Orchestra. In January 2011, Watts was appointed as an Artist in Residence at London's Southbank Centre for the 2011–12 season.

In 2016 she premiered the role of The Countess in Elena Langer's opera Figaro Gets a Divorce, at the Welsh National Opera.
