= Ailish Tynan =

Irish operatic soprano (born 1975)

Ailish Tynan (born 1975) is an Irish operatic soprano. She was born in Mullingar, Ireland.

== Career ==
Tynan trained at Trinity College Dublin, the Royal Irish Academy of Music in Dublin, and the Guildhall School of Music and Drama in London. In 2000, she won the RTÉ Millennium Singer of the Year.

She joined the Royal Opera House in Covent Garden on the Vilar Young Artists study programme. In 2003 she joined the BBC Radio 3 New Generation Artists scheme and won the 2003 Rosenblatt Recital Prize at BBC Cardiff Singer of the World.

Early in her career, Tynan became acquainted with the British composer Judith Weir. Tynan performed in recordings of works by Weir, including Natural History and The Welcome Arrival of Rain. Weir's song cycle Nuits d’Afrique was composed in 2015 specially for Tynan.

She performs internationally and has sung at concert halls and opera houses in Ireland, the UK, the US, Germany, Italy and Sweden. Tynan has appeared in productions of The Marriage of Figaro, Der Rosenkavalier and Albert Herring. At the BBC Proms, Tynan performed Reinhold Glière's Concerto for Coloratura Soprano and Orchestra.

Tynan also performs Lieder by Franz Schubert and Hugo Wolf, and has expressed a particular affinity with the vocal works of Gabriel Fauré. She frequently gives recitals accompanied by noted pianists such as Iain Burnside, James Baillieu, Graham Johnson and Simon Lepper, often at the Wigmore Hall in London, and has appeared at numerous cultural festivals including the Edinburgh International Festival, the City of London Festival, the Gregynog Music Festival, the St Magnus Festival, the Brighton Festival and the West Cork Chamber Music Festival.

== Personal life ==
Ailish Tynan is married to Keith McNicoll, principal bass trombonist at the Royal Opera House. They have a daughter.
