= Mariam Batsashvili =

Georgian pianist (born 1993)

Mariam Batsashvili მარიამ ბაწაშვილი
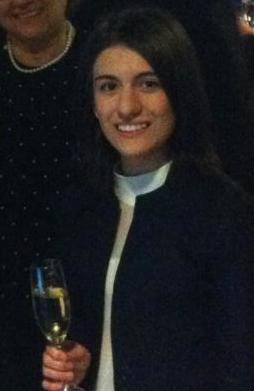
- Batsashvili in 2014

Background information
- Born: 1 June 1993 (age 33); Tbilisi, Georgia
- Genres: Classical
- Occupation: Pianist
- Instrument: Piano
- Years active: 2004–present
- Website: www.mariam-piano.com

Mariam Batsashvili (Note: Georgian: მარიამ ბაწაშვილი, romanized: Mariam Bats’ashvili) (born 1 June 1993) is a classical pianist from Georgia.

== Biography ==
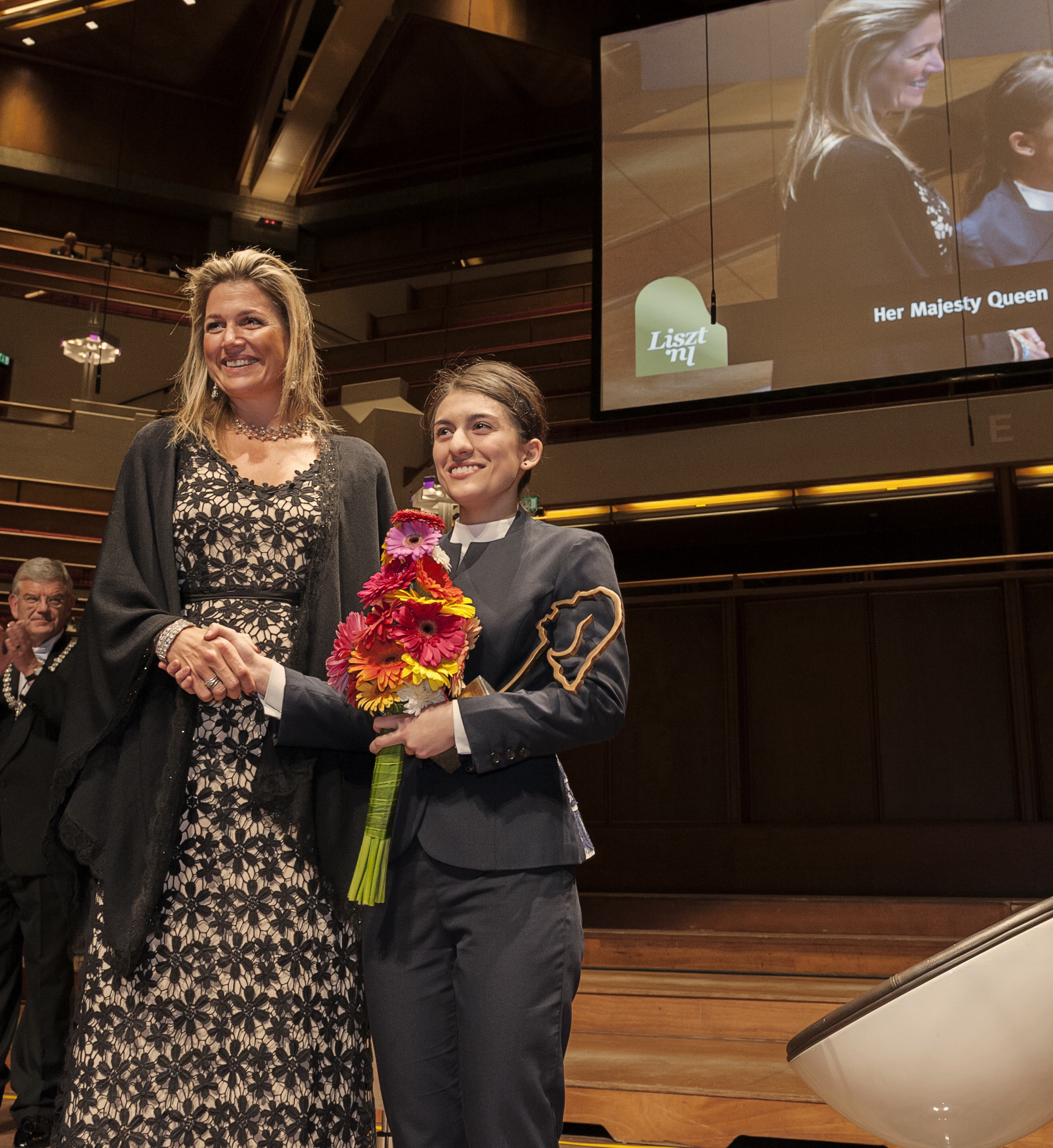
Mariam Batsashvili (right) and Queen Máxima of the Netherlands in 2014.

Batsashvili started playing piano when she was 5 under Natalia Natsvlishvili at the E. Mikeladze Central Music School before continuing at the Hochschule für Musik Franz Liszt in Weimar with Grigory Gruzman. In 2014, she won the 10th Franz Liszt Piano Competition in Utrecht, after having already triumphed in the International Franz Liszt Competition for Young Pianists in Weimar in 2011.

The following year, she had received the Arturo Benedetti Michelangeli Prize and she spent the 2016–17 season as a ‘Rising Star’ of the European Concert Hall Organization (ECHO).

Since 2017 she has been an official Yamaha artist.

Between 2017 and 2019, Mariam Batsashvili was one of the BBC's New Generation Artists

In 2019, her debut album with Warner Classics (Chopin-Liszt) was released.
