= Mark Simpson (clarinetist) =

British composer and clarinetist (born 1988)

- Born: 26 September 1988 (age 37); Liverpool, England
- Genres: Classical
- Occupation: Composer
- Instrument: Clarinet
- Years active: 2005–present
- Website: marksimpsonmusic.com

Mark Simpson (born 26 September 1988) is a British composer and clarinettist from Liverpool. In 2006, he became notable for winning both the BBC Young Musician of the Year (as clarinettist) and the BBC Proms/Guardian Young Composer of the Year, making him the first and, to date, only person to win both competitions.

== Education ==
Simpson attended King David High School, Liverpool and attended the Royal Northern College of Music junior department where he studied clarinet with Nicholas Cox and composition with Gary Carpenter. After a term at the Royal College of Music, Simpson attended St. Catherine's College, Oxford University, reading for a BA in music from 2008 to 2011. He also studied composition with Julian Anderson at the Guildhall School of Music and Drama and studied clarinet privately with Mark van de Wiel.

== Career as clarinettist ==
While at school, Simpson was principal clarinet in the National Youth Orchestra of Great Britain. He won the BBC Young Musician of the Year title on 20 May 2006, playing Nielsen's Clarinet Concerto with the Northern Sinfonia, conducted by Yan Pascal Tortelier at The Sage Gateshead.

The following year, he performed at the Last Night of the Proms in Hyde Park, London, performing Artie Shaw's Concerto for Clarinet. On 3 July 2008 he played in Liverpool as the solo clarinettist for the premiere of Emily Howard's Liverpool, The World in One City along with the Liverpool Youth Orchestra and five hundred primary school children.

Other notable concerto performances include Magnus Lindberg's Clarinet Concerto at the 2018 Proms with the BBC Philharmonic, John Adams’s Gnarly Buttons with the BBC National Orchestra of Wales, and appearances with the Royal Liverpool Philharmonic, Royal Northern Sinfonia City of London Sinfonia and BBC Concert Orchestra.

Simpson has also commissioned and premiered new works including Simon Holt's Joy Beast (2017), a concerto for basset clarinet and Edmund Finnis' Four Duets (2012) for clarinet and piano.

== Career as composer ==
Simpson has cited a number of composers as influences on his work, including György Ligeti, Thomas Adès, Julian Anderson, Mark-Anthony Turnage, John Adams, Helmut Lachenmann, Cornelius Cardew, Pierre Boulez, Karlheinz Stockhausen and Luigi Nono.

He has also drawn inspiration from painting and poetry, in works such as Ariel (2009), which was based on the Sylvia Plath poem of the same name, and a A mirror fragment… (2008), which was based on a poem by Melanie Challenger.

Early works by SImpson include the ensemble piece It Was As if the Earth Stood Still (2005), which was broadcast on BBC Radio 3's "Hear and Now" in November 2005, and Lov(escape) for clarinet and piano, which Simpson performed himself in the finalists' concert of the BBC Young Musician competition in September 2006.

Simpson's first orchestral commission was Threads for Orchestra, for the Royal Liverpool Philharmonic and National Youth Orchestra of Great Britain, which premièred at The Sage Gateshead on 1 April 2008.

In 2014 he was awarded one of five Sky Academy Arts Scholarships, during which he wrote his oratorio The Immortal, which was awarded the Classical Award at the South Bank Sky Arts Award in 2016, following its premiere by the BBC Philharmonic. In 2015 he was appointed as the BBC Philharmonic's Composer in Association.

Other significant works include Israfel (2015), premiered by the BBC Scottish Symphony Orchestra, and sparks, which was commissioned for the 2012 Last Night of the Proms.

Simpson's first opera Pleasure was commissioned by Opera North, the Royal Opera and Aldeburgh Music and premiered in 2016. Its plot concerns a woman, Val, who works as a toilet attendant in a gay nightclub. The cast of the first production included soprano Lesley Garrett as Val and baritone Steven Page as Anna Fewmore, an ageing drag queen.

The Violin Concerto was commissioned by the London Symphony Orchestra in 2019 and written for soloist Nicola Benedetti. It was recorded at LSO St Luke's on 11 April 2021 for an online premiere on 29 April.

Simpson was announced as Artist in Residence with the Royal Liverpool Philharmonic Orchestra for the 2025/26 season. He returns to his hometown for a five-concert series including the UK premiere of his viola concerto 'Hold Your Heart in Your Teeth' featuring Timothy Ridout. The role features Simpson's compositions as well as Simpson as a clarinet soloist.

In October 2025 Simpson was nominated for an Ivor Novello Award for his piece Darkness Moves II for horn and electronics.
