= Shai Wosner =

Israeli pianist (born 1976)

Shai Wosner (Hebrew: שי ווזנר) is a classical pianist. He was born in Israel in 1976 and now lives in the United States. He studied piano with Emanuel Krasovsky in Tel Aviv. From an early age he studied composition, as well as music theory and improvisation with Andre Hajdu. At the age of 21 he moved to New York, to study with Emanuel Ax at the Juilliard School.

In 1999, he won fourth prize at the Queen Elisabeth Competition in Brussels. Since then he has appeared with many important orchestras in the United States, including the Chicago Symphony Orchestra, the Philadelphia Orchestra, the Cleveland Orchestra, the Los Angeles Philharmonic, the San Francisco, Houston, Indianapolis orchestras, the St. Paul, Philadelphia and Orpheus chamber orchestras and many others. He has also appeared with various major orchestras in Europe, including the Berlin Staatskapelle, the Gothenburg Symphony and the Vienna Philharmonic.

In 2007 he was named a BBC Radio 3 New Generation Artist and has recorded extensively for the BBC's Radio 3 Network and appeared with the BBC Symphony, BBC Philharmonic, BBC Scottish Symphony and the BBC National Orchestra of Wales.

In addition to his solo appearances, he regularly collaborates in chamber music, for which he has been widely acclaimed. He has performed with musicians such as Pinchas Zukerman, Christian Tetzlaff, Lynn Harrell, Martha Argerich, Christiane Stotijn, Cho-Liang Lin. He has often appeared in duo-piano with his friend Orion Weiss.

In 2021, he performed with the Naumburg Orchestral Concerts, in the Naumburg Bandshell, Central Park, in the summer series.

Shai Wosner has received numerous awards, including the Avery Fisher Career Grant and the Borletti-Buitoni Trust Award. As a young student, he received scholarships from the America Israel Cultural Foundation.

Shai Wosner is a member of the Bard College Conservatory of Music faculty and the Juilliard School of Music.
