= Adam Walker (flautist) =

English musician (born 1987)

- Born: 26 December 1987 (age 38); Retford, Nottinghamshire, England
- Genre: Classical
- Instrument: Flute
- Formerly of: London Symphony Orchestra

Adam Walker was born in Retford, Nottinghamshire, in 1987. He is an English flautist.

== Early life ==
Walker taught himself to play the flute at the age of 9.

"Like so many kids, I started to play the recorder at primary school, but was lucky in that my classroom teacher was really passionate about classical music. She started to give me piano lessons when I was seven. My parents would go to a car boot sale every week, and on one occasion when I was eight, they brought me home a mini plastic flute, blown into like a recorder. I was hooked and desperate for a real flute! It turned out that the mum of a school friend had a flute in storage which she hadn't played for years, and she offered to lend it to me. Things then happened very quickly – after some dubious self-teaching, my primary school teacher heard me play and got in touch with a local ABRSM examiner, who suggested I audition for Chetham’s Music School. A few months later, I had left home and was studying music full-time."

— Interview with LSO Principal Flute Adam Walker, 2017

In 1996, he went to study at Chetham's School of Music, with Gitte Sorensen. In 2002, at the age of 14, he became the youngest ever winner of the British Flute Society Competition. In 2003 he won the Royal Over-Seas League prize for the woodwind player with the most promise and in 2004 was a Concerto Finalist in the BBC Young Musicians Competition (performing Nielsen's Flute Concerto with the BBC Scottish Symphony Orchestra conducted by Ilan Volkov at the Usher Hall in Edinburgh).

In September 2005, Walker won a scholarship to the Royal Academy of Music where he studied with Michael Cox.

== Orchestral and solo performances ==
Walker made many appearances on BBC Radio before making his Proms debut in 2008 at the age of 21. That year he was appointed principal flute of the London Symphony Orchestra (LSO), and in 2009 received the Outstanding Young Artist Award at MIDEM Classique in Cannes. In 2010 he won a Borletti-Buitoni Trust Fellowship Award and was shortlisted for the Royal Philharmonic Society Outstanding Young Artist Award.

In 2011, Walker gave the world premiere of Brett Dean's The Siduri Dances with the BBC National Orchestra of Wales. He was invited by Marin Alsop in 2013 to give the world premiere of Kevin Puts’ Flute Concerto at the Cabrillo Festival. The London Symphony Orchestra and BBT then jointly commissioned Huw Watkins to write a flute concerto which Adam premiered in February 2014 under Daniel Harding.

As a soloist, Walker performs with major UK orchestras including BBC Scottish Symphony Orchestra at the Southbank Centre's ‘The Rest is Noise’ Festival and with the Royal Philharmonic Orchestra, BBC Philharmonic Orchestra, Academy of St. Martin in the Fields, Hallé, Bournemouth Symphony, City of Birmingham Symphony and is a regular visitor to the BBC National Orchestra of Wales.

Further afield he has performed with the Baltimore Symphony Orchestra, Seattle Symphony, Seoul Philharmonic, Auckland Philharmonia, Malaysian Philharmonic, Malmö Symphony Orchestra, Vienna Chamber Orchestra, Solistes Européens, Luxembourg and the RTÉ National Symphony Orchestra.

== Recording career ==
He released his first CD 'Vocalise' in 2013 on the ROH Opus Arte Label. This includes works by Poulenc, Messiaen, Bartok, Barber and Schubert. His recording of the Kevin Puts Flute Concerto with Marin Alsop and the Peabody Institute was released on Naxos in 2016.
