= Beatrice Rana =

Italian pianist (born 1993)

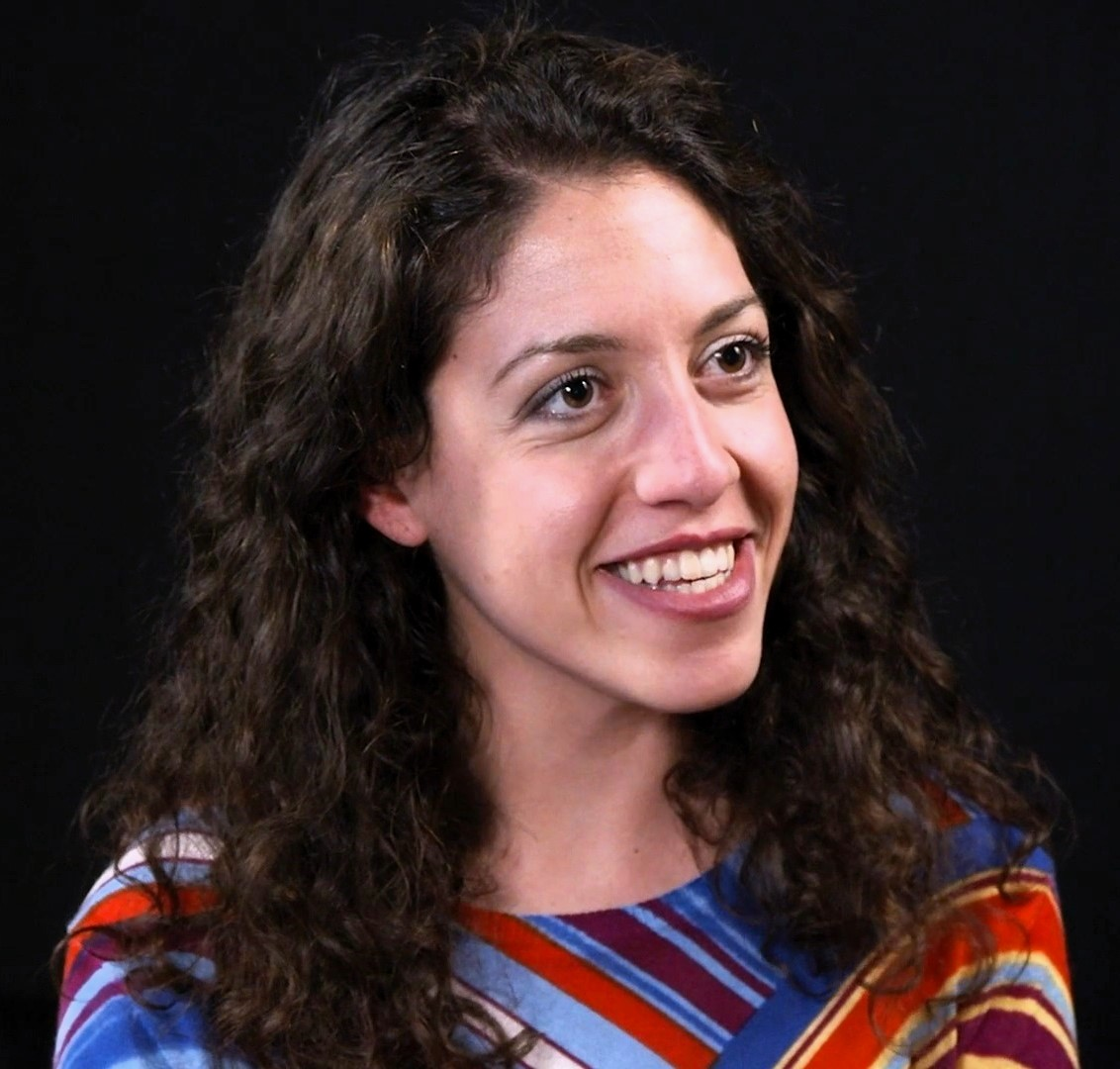
- Rana interviewed in 2019
- Born: 22 January 1993 (age 33); Copertino, Italy
- Occupation: Musician
- Awards: First Prize at Montreal International Piano Competition (2011)
- Musical career
- Genres: Classical
- Instrument: Piano
- Label: Warner Classics
- Website: https://www.beatriceranapiano.com/

Beatrice Rana (born 22 January 1993) is an Italian pianist.

== Early life ==
Born in Copertino, Rana began studying piano at the age of 4 and made her orchestral debut at 9, performing Bach's Piano Concerto in F minor conducted by Francesco Libetta. She studied with Benedetto Lupo at the Nino Rota Conservatory of Music in Monopoli and Arie Vardi at the Hochschule für Musik, Theater und Medien Hannover in Hanover, Germany.

== Career and recognition ==
Rana won the first prize and special jury prizes at the 2011 Montreal International Piano Competition and the silver medal at the 2013 Van Cliburn International Piano Competition.

Rana is an exclusive recording artist for Warner Classics. Her recordings of the Tchaikovsky First and Prokofiev Second concertos and Bach's Goldberg Variations contributed to her winning the 2017 Gramophone Classical Music Awards Young Artist of the Year. In 2018 she was nominated for the Classic Brit Awards in the "Best Female Artist of the Year" category for her recording of the Goldberg Variations.

In October 2018, Rana made her debut in Amsterdam with the Royal Concertgebouw Orchestra. On 24 and 25 September 2020, she performed Tchaikovsky's first piano concerto with the same orchestra.

On 12 March 2019, Rana made her Carnegie Hall debut, playing a recital that included Chopin's Twelve Etudes, Op. 25, to rave reviews. She returned on 7 June 2019 to play Prokofiev's Piano Concerto No. 3 with the Philadelphia Orchestra. She returned again on 17 October 2019, performing Bach's D minor and F minor keyboard concertos.

On 21 June 2025, Rana curated and performed at a gala concert at St. Peter's Square in Rome honoring newly installed Pope Leo XIV.

In November 2025, she performed Prokofiev's Piano Sonata No. 6 and selections from Romeo and Juliet along with music by Debussy and Tchaikovsky at Carnegie Hall and Boston's Jordan Hall.

Rana is represented by Charlotte Lee at Primo Artists.

== Personal life ==
Beatrice Rana has a sister, Ludovica, who is also a musician, a cellist. She considers herself Roman Catholic.

== Discography ==
- Chopin: 26 Préludes - Scriabin: Sonata No. 2, Op. 19, ATMA Classique (2012)
- Schumann: Symphonic Studies, Op. 13; Ravel: Gaspard de la nuit; Bartók: Out of Doors, Harmonia Mundi (2013)
- Prokofiev: Piano Concerto No. 2 - Tchaikovsky: Piano Concerto No. 1 with Orchestra dell'Accademia Nazionale di Santa Cecilia and Antonio Pappano, Warner Classics (2016)
- Bach: Goldberg Variations, Warner Classics (2017)
- Bernstein: Symphony No. 2 "The Age of Anxiety" with Orchestra dell'Accademia Nazionale di Santa Cecilia and Antonio Pappano, Warner Classics (2018)
- Ravel: Miroirs and La valse - Stravinsky: Trois movements de Petrushka and The Firebird, Warner Classics (2019)
- Schumann: Piano Concerto with Chamber Orchestra of Europe and Yannick Nézet-Séguin, Warner Classics (2023)
- Chopin & Beethoven Sonatas - Marche funèbre & Hammerklavier, Warner Classics (2024)
- Bach: Keyboard Concertos with Amsterdam Sinfonietta, Warner Classics (2025)
