= Ébène Quartet =

Quatuor Ébène
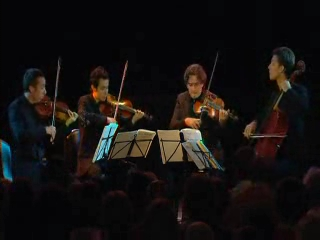

Background information
- Origin: Boulogne-Billancourt, France
- Years active: 1999–present
- Website: www.quatuorebene.com

The Ébène Quartet (French: Quatuor Ébène) is a French string quartet based in Boulogne-Billancourt, France.

== History ==
Quatuor Ébène was founded in 1999 at the Boulogne-Billancourt Conservatory in France. The group first came to international attention in 2004 when it won first prize in the string quartet category at the ARD International Music Competition, also taking the Audience Prize, two prizes for interpretation, and the Karl Klinger Foundation Prize. The next year, the group won the Belmont Prize from the Forberg-Schneider Foundation. In 2006, Quatuor Ébène released its first recording, a live recording of three Haydn quartets, to critical acclaim. In 2009, BBC Music Magazine named the quartet "Newcomer of the Year" for its recording of the Ravel, Fauré, and Debussy string quartets. The same album won the group Recording of the Year at the 2009 Classic FM Gramophone Awards. In 2010, the group was named Ensemble of the Year at the Victoires de la Musique Classique. NPR named Ébène's album Fiction one of its 50 favorite albums of 2011, describing the quartet's performance as brimming with "silky smoothness and Gallic finesse".

== Musical style ==
Quatuor Ébène is known for its versatility and performs a variety of genres, such as classical music, contemporary music, jazz, and crossover. Beyond its classical repertoire, some of the group's most popular performances have been crossover, such as a rendition of the soundtrack of Pulp Fiction, arrangements of classic Beatles hits, and a jazz vocal/instrumental arrangement of "Someday My Prince Will Come" from Snow White and the Seven Dwarfs.

New York Times music critic Allan Kozinn highlighted the group's versatility, describing the group as "a string quartet that can easily morph into a jazz band".

== Members ==
- Pierre Colombet, violin
- Gabriel Le Magadure, violin
- Mathieu Herzog, viola, until 2015
- Adrien Boisseau, viola, 2015–2017
- Marie Chilemme, viola, since 2017
- Matthieu Fontana, cello, until 2002
- Raphaël Merlin, cello, 2002–2024
- Yuya Okamoto, cello, since 2024

== Discography ==
- Haydn: Quatuors à Cordes (2006), Mirare
- Bartók: Quatuors Nos. 1-3 (2007), Mirare
- Debussy, Fauré & Ravel: String Quartets (2008), Erato
- Brahms: String Quartet No. 1; Piano Quintet (2008), Erato
- Fiction: Live at Folies Bergère (2011), Erato
- Mozart: Dissonances (2011), Erato
- Felix & Fanny Mendelssohn (2013), Erato
- Brazil (2014), Erato
- Menahem Pressler 90th Anniversary Concert: Live in Paris (2014), Erato
- Schubert: Quintet and Lieder (2016), Erato
- Beethoven: Complete String Quartets (2020), Erato
- Mozart: String Quintets Nos 3 and 4 (2023) Erato
