= David Gottesman (disambiguation) =

David Gottesman is an American businessman and billionaire.

David Gottesman may also refer to:

- David Samuel Gottesman (1885–1956), businessman who brought Central National-Gottesman to prominence
- David Gottesman (politician) (born 1948), member of the New Hampshire State Senate for District 12

== See also ==
- Gottesman (disambiguation)
