= Gottesman =

Gottesman is a surname of Germanic origin meaning man of God. Notable people with the surname include:

- Beyle Schaechter–Gottesman, Yiddish singer, songwriter, and poet
- Blake Gottesman, personal aide and bodyguard to President George W. Bush
- Daniel Gottesman, physicist, Perimeter Institute
- David Gottesman, billionaire, director of Berkshire Hathaway
- David Gottesman (politician)
- Dov Gottesman (1917–2011), Israeli art collector, president of the Israel Museum from 2001–11
- Irving Gottesman, psychiatric geneticist
- Joan Gottesman Wexler (born 1946), American Dean and President of Brooklyn Law School
- Michael Gottesman (lawyer), lawyer and law professor at Georgetown University
- Michael M. Gottesman, biochemist, National Institutes of Health
- Moshe Gottesman, rabbi, educator and community leader
- Noam Gottesman (born 1961), founding partner of GLG Partners hedge fund, son of Dov
- Rebecca Gottesman, neurologist and epidemiologist, Johns Hopkins University
- Rubin Gottesman, man found guilty of trafficking in child pornography in United States v. X-Citement Video
- Ruth Gottesman, American educator
- S.D. Gottesman, pen-name of author Cyril M. Kornbluth
- Samuel Gottesman, businessman who brought Central National-Gottesman to prominence
- Sanford Gottesman, president of The Gottesman Company, board member of OPIC, father of Blake
- Susan Gottesman, microbiologist, National Institutes of Health

== See also ==
- 18668 Gottesman, asteroid named after David Alexander Gottesman (born 1986)
- Gottesman–Knill theorem, theoretical result in quantum computing (QC) that states that an important subclass of quantum circuits, called stabilizer circuits, can be simulated efficiently
- Central National-Gottesman, pulp and paper marketer
