= Amihai Grosz =

Israeli musical artist

Amihai Grosz עמיחי גרוס
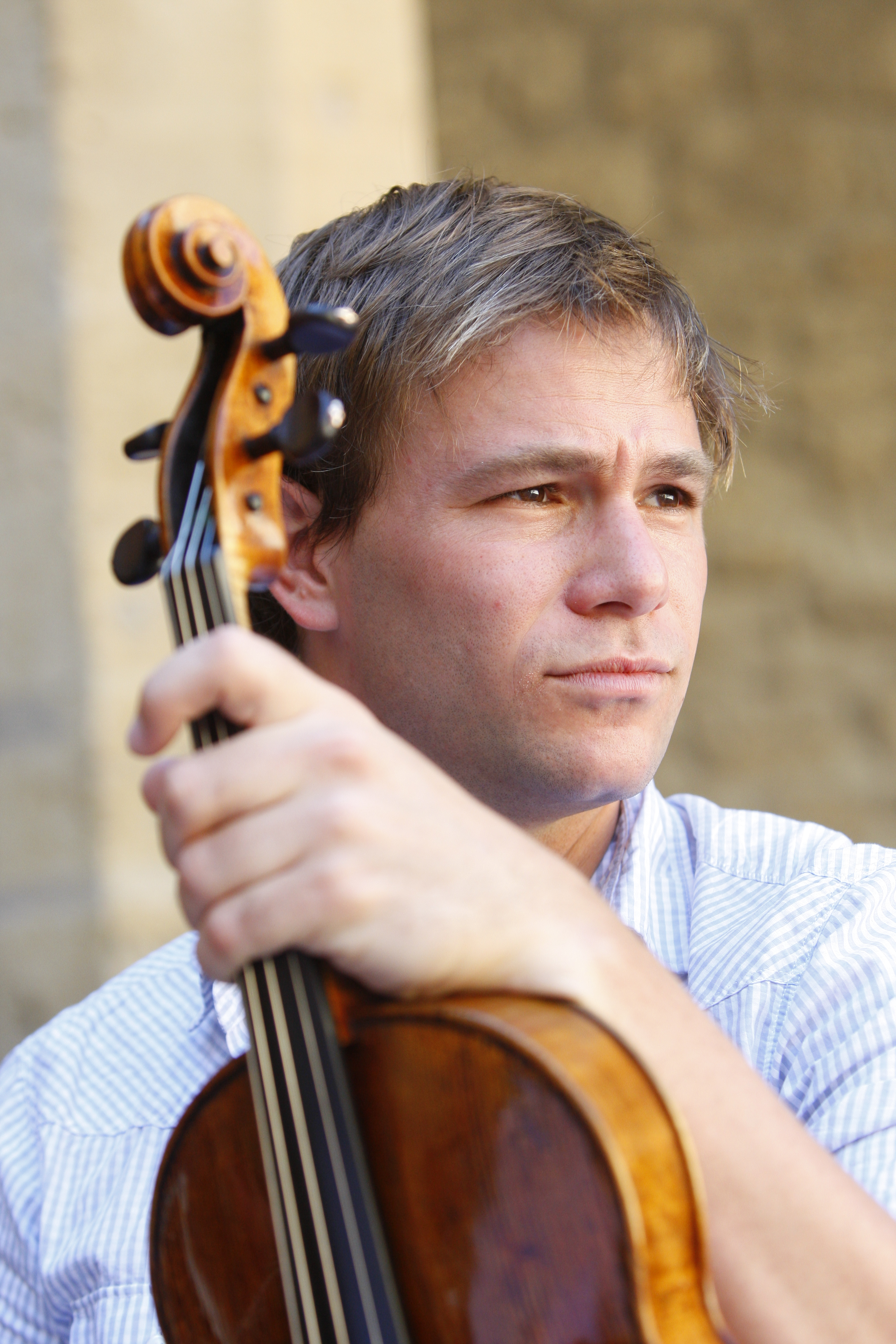
- Grosz in 2009

Background information
- Born: 1979 (age 46–47); Jerusalem, Israel
- Instrument: Viola
- Website: www.berliner-philharmoniker.de/en/about-us/orchestra/musicians/amihai-grosz/

Amihai Grosz (Hebrew: עמיחי גרוס; born in 1979 in Jerusalem) is an Israeli violist. From 1995 to 2009, he was the violist with the Jerusalem Quartet. Since 2010, Grosz has been the Principal Violist of the Berlin Philharmonic.

== Education ==
Grosz began to play the violin at age of five taking private lessons with Marc Benador before switching to the viola at age 11. His viola teachers were David Chen in Jerusalem, Tabea Zimmermann in Frankfurt and Berlin, and, in Tel Aviv, Haim Taub, who had a formative influence on him.

== Career ==
In 1995, Grosz was a founding member of the Jerusalem Quartet, playing with them until 2009. During his time with the Quartet, they signed a recording contract with Harmonia Mundi. In 2009, they won the ECHO Klassik Chamber Music Award for Schubert's String Quartet No. 14 "Death and the Maiden".

Their recording of two Haydn string quartets received a Diapason d'Or de l'Année 2009 and won the 2010 BBC Music Magazine Chamber Award.

In 1996, Grosz won first prize at the Brown-Roger Siegel Competition. In 2007, he received the Gottesman Prize for viola at the Aviv Competition.

In 2004, Grosz performed the world premiere of Omer Meir Wellber’s Viola Concerto. In 2012, he played Luciano Berio’s "Sequenza VI" for viola solo at the Philharmonie Berlin. In 2013, Grosz was soloist in Hector Berlioz's Harold en Italie conducted by Emanuel Krivine as part of the Berlioz Festival in France.

Grosz has played with Daniel Barenboim’s West-Eastern Divan Orchestra and the Jerusalem Symphony Orchestra. Grosz has also collaborated, in solo and in chamber music projects, with artists such as Yefim Bronfman, Emmanuel Pahud, Mitsuko Uchida, Oleg Maisenberg, Janine Jansen, Julian Rachlin and David Geringas; he performs regularly in concert halls and festivals such as the Delft Festival, Salon Festival, and Verbier Festival, BBC Proms, Bahnhof Rolandseck, Utrecht International Chamber Music Festival, Spectrum Concerts Berlin, West Cork Chamber Music Festival, and the Jerusalem Chamber Music Festival, founded by Elena Bashkirova in 2009.

Grosz plays a 1570 Gasparo da Salò viola on loan for life from a private collection.
