= Janine Jansen =

Dutch violinist (born 1978)

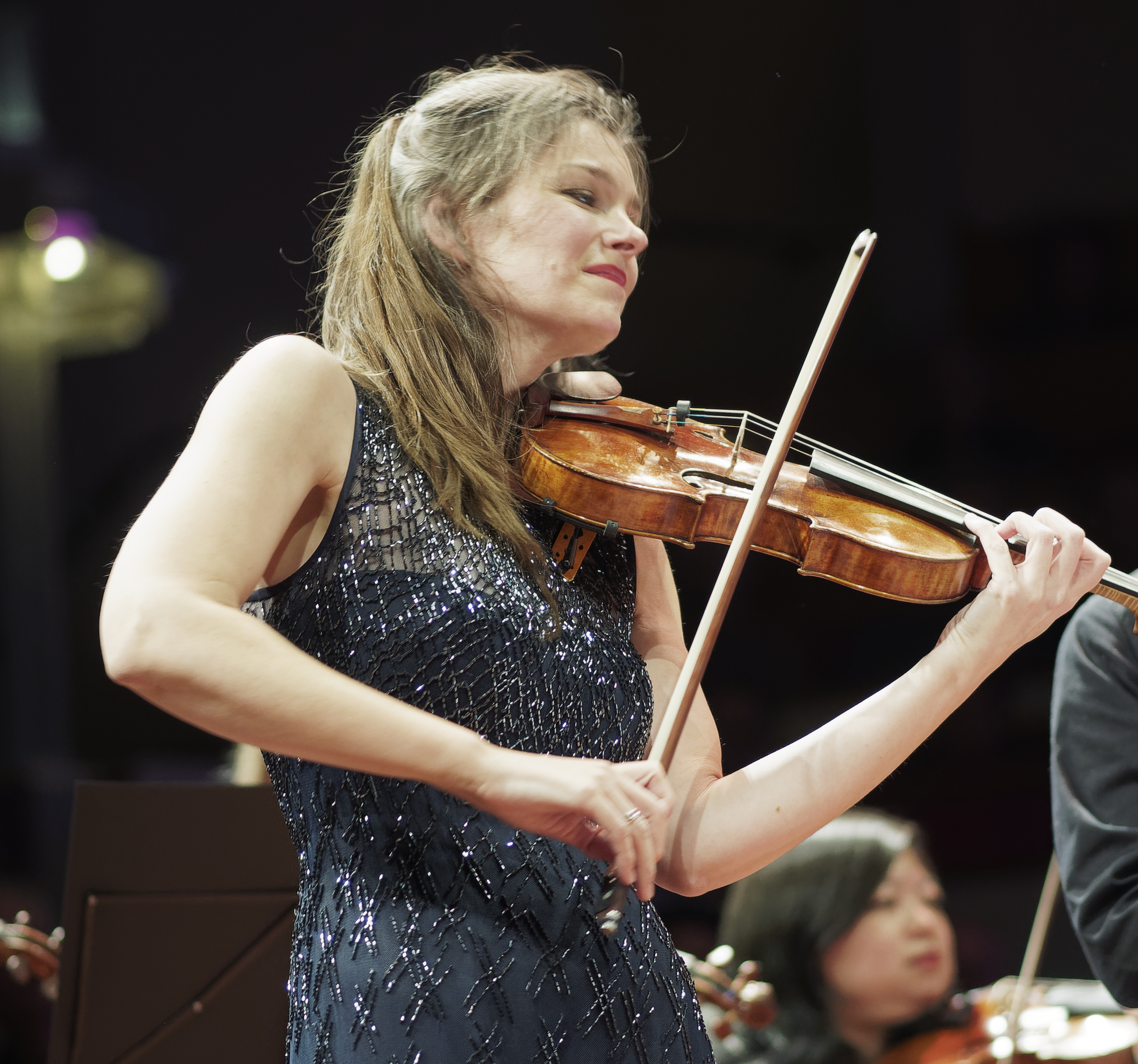
- Jansen in 2019
- Born: 7 January 1978 (age 48); Soest, Netherlands
- Education: Utrechts Conservatorium
- Occupations: Classical violinist and violist
- Website: https://www.janinejansen.com

Janine Jansen (born 7 January 1978) is a Dutch violinist and violist.

== Early life and education ==
Jansen was born in Soest in the Netherlands into a musical family. Her father Jan Jansen plays organ, harpsichord and piano; from 1987 to mid-2011 he was the organist of St. Martin's Cathedral, Utrecht, and was invested as a Knight of the Order of Orange-Nassau. Her mother was a classical singer; her brother David Jansen is a harpsichordist and organist; her brother Maarten is a cellist; and her uncle is the bass singer Peter Kooy. She began to study the violin at age 6, and has studied with Coosje Wijzenbeek, Philippe Hirschhorn, and Boris Belkin.

She competed as a Junior Competitor in the Menuhin Competition in 1991 and 1993, advancing to the finals in 1991.

She is married to Swedish conductor Daniel Blendulf and lives in Utrecht, the Netherlands.

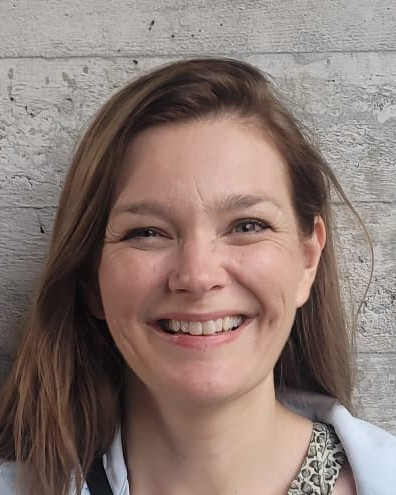
Janine Jansen (2025)

== Career ==
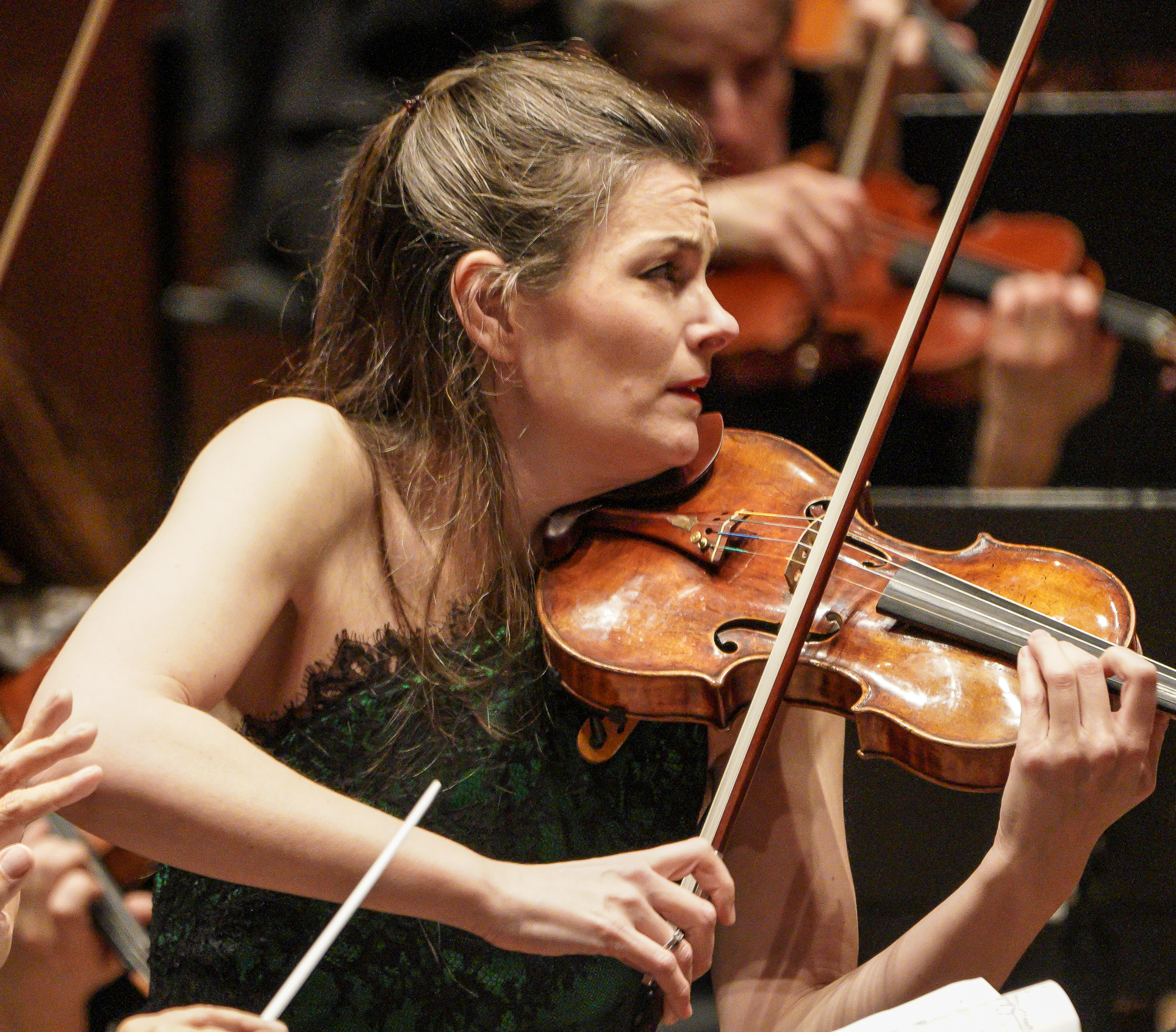
Jansen performing with the New York Philharmonic in 2020

She appeared as soloist with the National Youth Orchestra of Scotland in 2001, where she performed the Brahms Violin Concerto. She opened the BBC Proms in 2005.

She has eschewed tradition by recording with only five solo strings rather than an orchestra, including her brother as cellist and father playing continuo. In live concerts, she has received standing ovations from enthusiastic audiences, for example at the Berlin Philharmonic Orchestra 2006 concert at Berlin's Waldbühne, with a full attendance of 25,000, and in Los Angeles at the Walt Disney Concert Hall with the Los Angeles Philharmonic Orchestra in 2008 to a sold-out audience.

Jansen has performed with several famous violins, including the 1727 Stradivari "Barrere" violin, which was on loan from the Stradivari Society of Chicago, the 1727 Stradivari "Baron Deurbroucq", owned by the Beare's International Violin Society, and the 1707 Antonio Stradivari ‘Rivaz, Baron Gutmann’, owned by the Norwegian national bank's subsidiary, Dextra Musica. In September 2020, Janine was gifted the use of the 1715 Stradivari ‘Rode, Duke of Cambridge’ courtesy of a European benefactor.

She has begun her own chamber music festival in Utrecht. She has been a member of Spectrum Concerts Berlin since 1998.

She received the Dutch Music Prize in 2003, and the distinguished Royal Philharmonic Society Instrumentalist Award in Britain in 2009.

Jansen was a Radio 3 New Generation Artist from 2002–2004.

She and her ex-boyfriend, the violinist Julian Rachlin, have collaborated in chamber music performances.

In January 2018, Jansen performed Max Bruch's Violin Concerto No. 1 under Daniele Gatti's baton.

In February of the same year, Jansen performed with Mischa Maisky, Martha Argerich and Barbican Conservatory at the Barbican Centre.

In December 2018, Jansen performed with Valery Gergiev and the Royal Concertgebouw Orchestra.

In September 2021, Jansen starred in a documentary film about the violin luthier Antonio Stradivari.

For her performance with Royal Concertgebouw Orchestra between 1997 and 2018, Jansen became a recipient of the Johannes Vermeer Award, which was awarded to her by the Dutch Minister of Education, Culture and Science, Ingrid van Engelshoven.

== Recordings ==
As of January 2006, she had recorded two mainstream CDs (one also a hybrid SACD). The first is a collection of encore pieces, conducted by Barry Wordsworth, the second a chamber ensemble rendition of Vivaldi's Four Seasons. In particular, her Vivaldi recording has seen great success in terms of download sales.

In October 2006, she released her third album. This CD features the Mendelssohn and Bruch Violin Concertos, along with the Bruch Romance for Viola, with conductor Riccardo Chailly and the Leipzig Gewandhaus Orchestra.

In 2007, she released her fourth album, Bach: Inventions & Partita.

In 2008, she recorded a live session for the iTunes music store consisting of Bach's "Trio Sonata in G Major" and "Sonata for Violin and Harpsichord No. 6 In G Major".

In 2009, Jansen released her recording of the Beethoven and Britten Violin Concertos. The Beethoven was recorded with Die Deutsche Kammerphilharmonie Bremen, and the Britten with the London Symphony Orchestra. Both orchestras were conducted by Paavo Järvi. Jansen said that recording these concertos together was a long-standing desire of hers, as she sees these two works as among the greatest concertos in the current repertoire.

On 29 December 2010, Jansen played with Mischa Maisky and Hannes Minnaar Antonín Dvořák's Piano Trio in e minor, op.90 'Dumky' at the Internationaal Kamermuziekfestival Utrecht, Vredenburg.

Jansen has been a member of the chamber music series Spectrum Concerts Berlin since 1998. Various CDs with Spectrum have been released on the NAXOS label: Ernő Dohnányi – Serenade for String Trio and the Sextet (Nr. 8.557153) Robert Helps – Piano Quartet, Postlude and Nocturne (Nr. 8.559199) John Harbison – Four Songs of Solitude, Variations and Twilight Music (Nr. 8.559173).

In 2010, she recorded her first recital for violin and piano with Itamar Golan, issued by Decca the next year. She chose a French repertoire, exposing her wonderful sophisticated sound. In addition to Debussy's and Ravel's sonatas for violin and piano and other pieces from the French 20th century, she recorded some pieces by Richard Dubugon, who composed them for Jansen.

In 2012, Jansen recorded an album dedicated to Prokofiev, combining chamber music and concert music. With the London Philharmonic Orchestra conducted by Vladimir Jurowski, she played Prokofiev's concerto for violin and orchestra no. 2; with her colleague Boris Brovtsyn, she played the sonata for two violins in C major; finally, with Itamar Golan at piano, Jansen recorded the violin sonata in F minor.

Jansen also recorded an album of chamber music with the violinist Boris Brovtsyn, the violists Amihai Grosz and Maxim Rysanov, the cellists Torleif Thedéen and Jens Peter Maintz. The album contains Verklärte Nacht by Schoenberg in its original version, for string sextet, and the string quintet in C major by Schubert. The album was issued by Decca on 1 April 2013.

In June 2013, Jansen recorded her second album devoted to Bach. She recorded Bach's concertos for violin in A minor and in E major with a small ensemble with players chosen by herself (strings: Boris Brovtsyn, Cindy Albracht, Fredrik Paulsson, Julia-Maria Kretz, Tijmen Huisingh, Monika Urbonaite, Nimrod Guez, Pauline Sachse, Maarten Jansen, Rick Stotijn; harpsichord: Jan Jansen) and the concerto for violin and oboe with the soloist Ramón Ortega Quero. She added two sonatas for violin and harpsichord, recorded with her father Jan Jansen, the 3rd in E major and the 4th in C minor.
