= Ira Wallach =

Ira Wallach may refer to:

- Ira Wallach (writer) (1913–1995), American screenwriter and novelist
- Ira D. Wallach (1909–2007), American businessman and philanthropist
