= Frank Sumner Dodge =

- Born: 3 January 1950 (age 76); Boston, Massachusetts
- Genres: Classical
- Occupations: Cellist, Music Director
- Instrument: Cello
- Years active: 1969–present
- Website: http://www.spectrumconcerts.com/

Frank Sumner Dodge (born January 3, 1950) is a cellist and artistic director of chamber music ensembles. Frank began studying the cello at 16. His instructors were Jacobus Langendoen, Alfred Zighera, Aldo Parisot, Pierre Fournier, Eberhard Finke and Maurice Gendron. He founded the Strawbery Banke Chamber Music Festival, Inc. in Portsmouth, New Hampshire and was artistic director and cellist from 1969-1980 and again in 1997. He moved to Berlin, Germany in 1982 and founded the privately supported Spectrum Concerts Berlin in 1988.

== Biography ==
Frank attended master classes of János Starker and Mstislav Rostropovich and received a B.M. from the New England Conservatory of Music in Boston and a M.Mus. from Yale University. Dodge was founding member of the Portsmouth Chamber Ensemble, winners in 1981 of the Artists International Competition in New York.

He lived in New York from 1978-1982 as member of the Opera Orchestra of New York, the St. Lukes Chamber Ensemble, the Orchestra of our Time and as principal cellist of the Stamford Symphony, before moving to Berlin in 1982. From 1983-1993 he performed regularly with the Berlin Philharmonic Orchestra and in 1984, Jesús López-Cobos invited him to become a member of the Spanish National Orchestra. A Highlands tour as principal cellist of the Scottish Chamber Orchestra under the direction of Jaime Laredo followed in the spring of 1985. He has lived in Berlin since.

Fellowships from the National Endowment for the Arts, the New Hampshire Commission on the Arts, the Martha Baird Rockefeller Fund for Music, and the Greater Piscataqua Community Foundation supported his USA based endeavors. A two-year fellowship from the Frank Huntington Beebe Fund for Musicians in Boston and two Individual Artists Fellowships from the New Hampshire State Council on the Arts assisted him with study abroad.

Frank founded Spectrum Concerts Berlin in 1988 in what was still West Berlin. The concerts were recorded by Sender Freies Berlin for National Public Radio. His work in Berlin has been supported by private individuals, companies and foundations, including the Ernst von Siemens Foundation in Munich, the Aaron Copland Fund for Music, the Robert Helps Music Trust, the Körber Foundation and the Koussevitzky Music Foundation. Former president of Germany Richard von Weizsäcker became honorary chairman in 2002 of the support-circle for Spectrum Concerts Berlin, and he spoke of Frank Dodge as one of those ″great artistic personalities″ that are needed to promote cultural cities.

Both concerts and recordings of the ensemble under Dodge's leadership have been highly praised.

In February 2013 Dodge went with three fellow musicians to Prizren, Kosovo, to the music school Lorenc Antoni, to provide encouragement and inspiration where everything is missing (rooms, instruments, notes, books), but where young people from different religions and cultures have an opportunity for a peaceful coexistence; a 45-minute documentary film for rbb Radio Brandenburg called ″Sehsucht Musik - Forgotten Voices″ covered the visit. The musicians returned in May 2014, a visit documented by photographer Adil Razali. The connection is continuing with a campaign to help rebuild music schools in Kosovo.

Frank Dodge performs on a cello by Antonio Casini dated 1676 from Modena, Italy, and on a cello by Jebran Yakoub dated 2010 from Cremona, Italy.

== Recordings ==
As artistic director of Spectrum Concerts Berlin Frank Dodge has overseen a number of highly praised CDs for Naxos Records. These include three albums devoted to the chamber music of Ernst Toch, two to Robert Helps, as well as Ernö Dohnányi, John Harbison, Paul Hindemith, Stanley Walden, Ursula Mamlok, Anton Arensky, Erwin Schulhoff, in 2020 Erich Wolfgang Korngold, in 2022 and 2024 Sergei Taneyev and in 2026 Ernest Bloch.

Additional recordings include an album on New World Records (originally CRI) devoted to new chamber and solo music of David Del Tredici, Robert Helps, Jan Radzynski and Tison Street, and the piano quartets of Johannes Brahms co-produced by Sender Freies Berlin in 2000.

== Films ==
Two documentary films about Spectrum Concerts Berlin and Frank Dodge have been made: "Next Stop Manhattan - 20 Years Spectrum Concerts Berlin", a 2008 film by Renate Lieberenz and Petra Kölsch for rbb Fernsehen, and "Sehnsucht Musik - Spectrum Concerts Berlin im Kosovo", a 2013 film by Cetin Tutak und Marian Piper.
