= Sommerliche Musiktage Hitzacker =

- Genre: mostly chamber music
- Begins: end of July
- Ends: beginning of August (9 days)
- Frequency: annual
- Location: Hitzacker
- Inaugurated: 1946; 80 years ago
- People: Hans Döscher; Carolin Widmann; Oliver Wille
- Website: www.musiktage-hitzacker.de

Sommerliche Musiktage Hitzacker ("summerly music days Hitzacker") is the name of a traditional international festival of classical chamber music in Hitzacker, Lower Saxony, Germany. Founded in 1946, it is held annually for nine days beginning with the last weekend in July.

== History ==
The first festival was held in the summer of 1946, it is therefore regarded as the first chamber music festival in Germany. The first artistic director was the cellist Hans Döscher who directed the festival until his death in 1971. He focused the festival on chamber music, both Early music and contemporary. From 2012 to 2015, the violinist Carolin Widmann directed the festival. From 2016, Oliver Wille has been the director, a founding member of the Kuss Quartet and a professor of chamber music for strings at the Musikhochschule Hannover.

== Program ==
The program has included concerts of chamber music from medieval to regular premieres, new concert projects, literature, dance and film. Each year used to have a motto, such as "Europe" in 2009 and "Ins Labor" in 2010, presenting experiments in music, and music related to inventors. In 2016, the new director programmed without a motto, but focused on the festival as a meeting point and had the audience decide one concert program.

Premieres have included the Flute Concerto by Isang Yun on 30 July 1977, played by Karlheinz Zöller and conducted by Günther Weißenborn. Jörg Widmann's second string quartet, Choralquartett, was commissioned by the festival and premiered by the Keller Quartet on 29 July 2003.

=== Focus ===
- 2018 Beethoven
- 2021 Schubert
- 2023 Mozart
- 2026 Haydn

== Artists ==
International artists who have appeared at the festival include "composers in residence" such as Krzysztof Penderecki in 2001, before Aribert Reimann, Olivier Messiaen, György Ligeti and Witold Lutosławski, also Heinz Holliger, Bernhard Lang, Helmut Lachenmann and Wolfgang Rihm. Dieter Ammann was composer in residence in 2014.

Instrumentalists have included Anatol Ugorski, Boris Pergamenschikow, Dinorah Varsi, Rosamunde Quartet, Hilliard Ensemble, Stephen Kovacevich, Patricia Kopatchinskaja and Sol Gabetta, and Ensemble Modern. The conductor and pianist Marino Formenti received the Belmont Prize at the festival in 2009.
