= Esther Gottesman =

American philanthropist and Zionist (1898–1997)

Esther G. Gottesman
- Born: Esther Garfunkel; 1898
- Died: October 1, 1997 (aged 98)
- Spouse: Benjamin Gottesman
- Children: 2, including David Gottesman
- Relatives: Samuel Gottesman (brother-in-law)

Esther G. Gottesman (née Garfunkel; 1898–October 1, 1997) was an American philanthropist and Zionist.

== Early life and education ==
Gottesman was the daughter of Aaron and Sarah Garfunkel. Her father was a founder of the Federation of Jewish Philanthropies. She graduated from New York University in 1921, the year she married banker and investment manager Benjamin Gottesman; he died in 1979.

== Career ==
Gottesman was a delegate to the first post-WWII World Zionist Congress, held in Basel, Switzerland, in 1946. She was a member of World Zionist Organization Action Committee in the early years of Israeli statehood.

She was active in the Board of Jewish Education (New York). She was a member of the board of the Hadassah Women's Zionist Organization of America from 1946 until her death.

Gottesman is credited with developing Hadassah's house newsletter into Hadassah Magazine.

Gottesman persuaded her brother-in-law Samuel Gottesman to purchase the Dead Sea Scrolls and give them to Israel; the family built the Shrine of the Book at the Israel Museum to hold the scrolls.

== Personal life ==
The Gottesman's had two sons, David S. Gottesman and Milton M. Gottesman.

Gottesman and her husband were donors to Yeshiva University, where the Mendel Gottesman Library is named after her father-in-law. She died on October 1, 1997, at the age of 98.
