= List of manuscripts from Qumran Cave 10 =

Wiki media list

List of the manuscripts from Qumran Cave 10
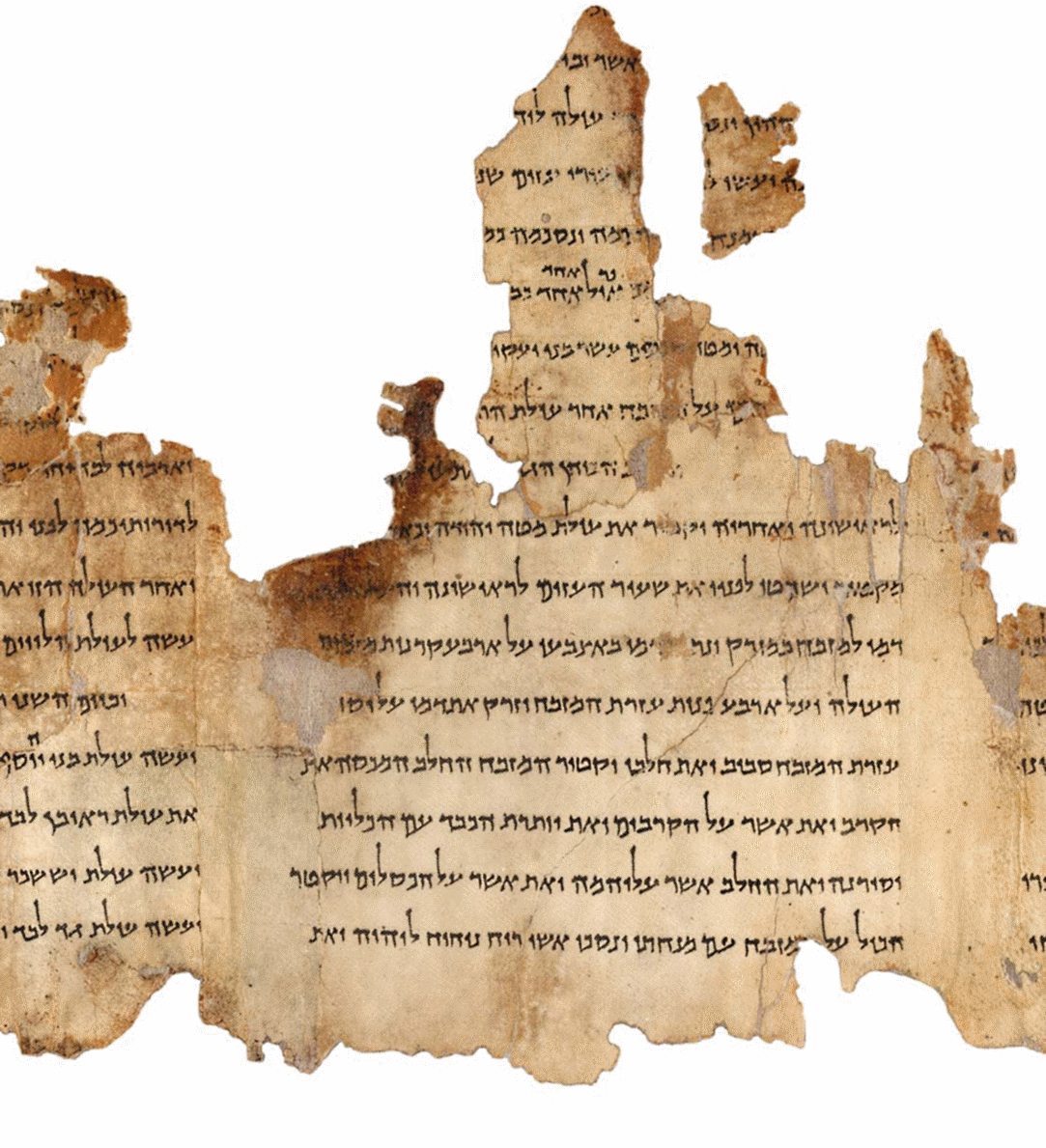
- A view of part of the Temple Scroll that was found in Qumran Cave 11.
- Material: ostraca
- Writing: Hebrew
- Created: c. 408 BCE to 318 CE
- Discovered: 1956
- Present location: Qumran

The following is a list of the Dead Sea Scrolls from the cave 10 near Qumran.

== Description ==
In Wadi Qumran Cave 10 archaeologists found two ostraca with writing on them, along with an unknown symbol on a grey stone slab.

== List of manuscripts ==
Some resources for more complete information on the Dead Sea Scrolls are the book by Emanuel Tov, "Revised Lists of the Texts from the Judaean Desert" for a complete list of all of the Dead Sea Scroll texts, as well as the online webpages for the Shrine of the Book and the Leon Levy Collection, both of which present photographs and images of the scrolls and fragments themselves for closer study.

Fragment or scroll identifier	Fragment or scroll name	Alternative identifier	English Bible Association	Language	Date/script	Description	Reference
Qumran Cave 10
10QOstracon	Ostracon	10Q1		Hebrew		Two letters written on a piece of pottery.	

== See also ==
- Biblical manuscripts
- Septuagint manuscripts
- List of Hebrew Bible manuscripts
