= John Edwin Mroz =

Founder, president, and CEO of the EastWest Institute

John Edwin Mroz (May 1, 1948 – August 15, 2014) was the founder, president, and CEO of the EastWest Institute, best known for his diplomatic efforts in the Israeli-Palestinian conflict.

== Career ==
Mroz was born on May 1, 1948, in Lowell, Massachusetts. He grew up in nearby Westfield, Massachusetts, where his father was a dentist. He completed his BA at the University of Notre Dame, followed by an MA at Northeastern University, and an MALD at The Fletcher School of Law and Diplomacy. He was married to Karen Linehan Mroz (1972–2014).

In 1980 Mroz and Ira D. Wallach set out to address areas of political dispute across the Iron Curtain by forming the Institute for East West Security Studies (later renamed the EastWest Institute), an international not-for-profit, non-partisan "think and do" tank focusing on international conflict resolution through a variety of means, including track 2 diplomacy and track 1.5 diplomacy (conducted with the direct involvement of official actors), hosting international conferences, and authoring publications on international security issues.

In 1980 he published Beyond Security: Private Perceptions Among Arabs and Israelis, which examined the persistence of the Israeli-Palestinian dispute.

In 1981 the State Department under the Reagan Administration took the diplomatic initiative and established a secret contact with the PLO through Mroz, which was aborted after the start of the 1982 Lebanon War. The substance of the talks between Mroz and Yasser Arafat was PLO recognition of Israel in return for U.S. recognition of the PLO.

After the fall of the Berlin Wall and the dissolution of the Soviet Union, the institute changed its name to the EastWest Institute, and widened its focus, consulting with European governments on the reunification of Germany and other post-Communist challenges.

Mroz served as an advisor to more than 20 governments including the United States, Germany, Turkey, Ukraine, Poland and the Russian Federation, as well as the G-8, the European Commission, the African Union, NATO, and the Council of Europe. He received numerous international awards including the Das Verdienstkreuz 1. Klasse (Officer's Cross), Germany's highest award to a non-citizen in recognition of the role he and his institute played in facilitating German reunification.

Mroz was an active member of the Council on Foreign Relations and appeared frequently on BBC, CNN, ABC and other news programs around the world. He spoke regularly before business and professional groups including Institutional Investor, Fortune Global Forum, the Young Presidents' Organization, WPO, CEO, the Russell 20-20, the International Chamber of Commerce World Congress, the Eurasian Media Forum, Davos, and the World Future Society

Mroz died on August 15, 2014, in Manhattan, New York, from complications of a blood cancer and macrophage activation syndrome (MAS).

== Publications ==
He wrote regularly in the international press on global change and international security affairs. Mroz contributed to Foreign Affairs, as well as to journals and books on leadership and management including chapters in the Peter Drucker Foundation’s Organization of the Future (Jossey-Bass, 1997) and Leaders of the Future (Jossey-Bass, 2006). His work as a global change agent has been described in numerous volumes including Leaders Who Make a Difference (Jossey-Bass, 1999).

Mroz was also the author of a landmark book on the Israeli–Palestinian conflict, Beyond Security: Private Perceptions Among Arabs and Israelis.
