= First Manhattan =

United States wealth management company

FMC Group Holdings LLC
- Type: Private
- Industry: Financial Services, Asset Management, Wealth Management
- Founded: 1964
- Headquarters: New York City
- Key people: Robert Gottesman (executive chairman), Zac Wydra (CEO), Alvaro Spinola (CFO/COO)
- Products: Investment management, Private investment funds, and ETFs
- AUM: US$34+ billion (2024)
- Number of employees: 130
- Website: www.firstmanhattan.com

FMC Group Holdings LLC, doing business as First Manhattan (FM) is a brokerage and wealth management firm founded in 1964 by a group of financial industry executives led by David "Sandy" Gottesman. FM remains independently owned and operated, with operating subsidiaries that include an SEC‑registered investment adviser and a broker‑dealer registered with FINRA. As of 2024, FM is led by Zac Wydra, CEO and portfolio manager, and Alvaro Spinola, CFO/COO.

FM is based in New York City.

== History ==
Sandy Gottesman co-founded First Manhattan in 1964. He died on September 28, 2022, at the age of 96.

Robert Gottesman, Sandy Gottesman's son, joined First Manhattan in 1987.

In March 2026, Beddow Capital Management, a registered investment advisor with more than $300M in assets under management, became part of First Manhattan. Edward Beddow joined the Firm as Senior Managing Director and Portfolio Manager. He has nearly 40 years of experience in the financial markets and previously worked in investment banking at Dean Witter Reynolds. He is based in Jackson, Wyoming.

In January 2026, Adam Yale joined First Manhattan as a Portfolio Manager, based in Omaha, Nebraska. Yale previously served as a Partner at Lawson Kroeker Investment Management and has more than two decades of experience managing client portfolios. His move marked a return to the Firm where he began his investment career. Yale brought longstanding client relationships and has familial ties to Borsheims, the Omaha-based jeweler retailer in which Berkshire Hathaway purchased a majority interest in 1989.

In August 2025, the team from Roanoke Asset Management, a New Jersey-based registered investment advisor with over $350M in assets under management, joined First Manhattan. The firm was founded in 1978 by Edwin Vroom, who co-managed client portfolios alongside Adele Weisman for over four decades. Both joined First Manhattan as Senior Managing Directors and Portfolio Managers. The team brought with them a longstanding focus on fundamentals-based investing and personalized client service.

In April 2025, Grand‑Jean Capital Management, a registered investment adviser with more than US$500 million in assets under management, joined First Manhattan. Steven Grand‑Jean founded Grand‑Jean Capital Management in 1990 after a 20‑year career in investment banking.

The firm has launched two exchange-traded funds (ETFs) under its First Manhattan Excelsior ETFs banner, with First Manhattan Partner and Head of Research Himayani Puri as the portfolio manager. FM Focus Equity ETF (ticker: FMCX) was launched in April 2022, and FM Compounders Equity ETF (ticker: FMCE) was launched in November 2024.

In 2025, First Manhattan was ranked 15th on Barron’s list of the Top 100 RIA Firms and 21st on Financial Advisor magazine’s America’s Top RIAs list.

== Description ==
First Manhattan provides investment advisory and wealth planning services to high‑net‑worth individuals, as well as to partnerships, trusts, retirement accounts, and institutional clients. The firm manages investments on a fully discretionary basis for accounts ranging from under US$1 million to over US$100 million. The firm currently manages in excess of US$34 billion, utilizing a research‑driven, long‑term, value‑oriented investment approach.

The firm's clients are significant owners of Berkshire Hathaway stock, and the firm has established a reputation for utilizing investing strategies similar to that espoused by Warren Buffett. The firm's founder, Sandy Gottesman, was an early investor in Berkshire Hathaway and maintained a long‑standing friendship with Buffett. During the Berkshire Hathaway 2025 Annual Meeting, Buffett paid tribute to Gottesman, saying: “The Berkshire experience is pretty dramatic. To operate with Sandy Gottesman from 1963 until he died a couple years ago … you really can’t miss. You’ll learn all the time but you’ll learn not only how to be successful in business, you’ll learn how to be successful in life.” First Manhattan’s investment approach is to establish long‑term positions in portfolio companies, most often relying on fundamental analysis and targeting value in the public equity and fixed‑income markets of the United States.

FM is based in New York City.

== People ==
As of 2015 Robert Gottesman was the firm's executive chairman and a portfolio manager. In an article in FA Magazine August 2025 Robert Gottesman was still identified as Chairman.

As of 2024 the firm's Management Team, led by CEO Zac Wydra and CFO/COO Alvaro Spinola, is responsible for the management and day‑to‑day operations of the firm.
