= Spectrum Concerts Berlin =

Spectrum Concerts Berlin is a German classical chamber music ensemble.

== Biography and career ==
Founded by cellist Frank Sumner Dodge in 1988, Spectrum Concerts Berlin is a chamber ensemble that performs music from the baroque and classical periods as well as 20th century and contemporary chamber music. The ensemble features a number of musicians, including Janine Jansen, Boris Brovtsyn, Robert D. Levin, Eldar Nebolsin, Maxim Rysanov, Clara-Jumi Kang, Torleif Thedéen, Alexander Sitkovetsky, Jens Peter Maintz and many others. A sister group, Spectrum Concerts Berlin-USA, Inc., was founded in New York City in 2005 for the purpose of extending the work of the ensemble. Spectrum Concerts Berlin-USA, Inc. opened with two concerts in November 2006 at Zankel Hall, in Carnegie Hall. Reviewers have showered praise for years, both in reviews of their live performances at the Berliner Philharmonie, and of their recordings.

The Vision

A century ago America and Europe were united by strong bonds of musical appreciation. Separated after two wars, these important cultures can be significantly re-connected through the shared experience of high-level chamber music. Music is a medium of powerful and direct communication, which can create moments of profound understanding, and insights that are beyond the power of words. Chamber music, so-called from the smaller spaces and numbers of performers typically involved, provides an especially intimate and compelling musical experience.

The Mission

Founded in 1988 by Frank Sumner Dodge, an American cellist living in Germany, Spectrum Concerts Berlin has become well established and widely acclaimed in its native city. Presentation of music by contemporary American composers has been an integral and important part of its presence. Two American Music Weeks hosted in 1990 and 2000 by high-level political and cultural figures were enhanced by lectures and art exhibitions. Highly praised CD’s have made the group’s work available worldwide. Spectrum Concerts Berlin has also organized programs for European music students including two visits to the USA. With the wide acceptance in Berlin, Spectrum Concerts Berlin – USA, Inc., Expanding the Language of Chamber Music has been organized to extend the work of Spectrum Concerts Berlin – performances by the professional ensemble, master classes and related cultural experiences.

Spectrum Concerts Berlin has recorded extensively for the Naxos label, including three albums devoted to the chamber music of Ernst Toch, two to Robert Helps as well as Ernst von Dohnányi, John Harbison, Paul Hindemith, Stanley Walden, Ursula Mamlok, Anton Arensky, Erwin Schulhoff, in 2020 two releases of chamber music of Erich Wolfgang Korngold and in 2022 Béla Bartók and Sergei Taneyev. A second CD of Taneyev's chamber music was released in 2024, and a CD of music for violin and piano by Ernest Bloch is planned for 2026. Additional recordings include an album on New World Records (originally CRI) devoted to new chamber and solo music of David Del Tredici, Robert Helps, Jan Radzynski and Tison Street, the piano quartets of Johannes Brahms co-produced by Sender Freies Berlin (now rbb kultur) in 2000. The quintet "Breezes" by Ursula Mamlok was composed for Spectrum Concerts Berlin, recorded by Deutschlandfunk Kultur and released on Bridge Records Inc. as Volume V of Ursula Mamlok.
