= Bradner Smith & Company =

Bradner Smith & Company was a US paper manufacturer and dealer. It was established in Chicago, Illinois in 1853. In 2013, it was announced that Central National-Gottesman had acquired the assets and business of Bradner Central Company which operated Bradner Smith.

== History ==
The firm of Bradner Smith & Co., manufacturers and dealers in paper, was established in 1853 at No. 12 LaSalle Street in a 20 by 60 feet (6.1 m × 18.3 m) store. It became one of the largest paper firms in the world, doing a business of US$2,000,000 a year. The firm had three establishments in the city of Chicago, branch houses at Kansas City, Missouri, Minneapolis, Minnesota, and Saint Paul, Minnesota. It operated six paper mills, manufacturing and selling every sort and size of news, book, wrapping, writing, blotting, and other papers, card board, envelopes, twines, wood pulp, and paper manufacturers' supplies.

There was very little paper manufactured in the West when Bradner Smith & Co. commenced business, and most of their stock was brought from East Coast mills. The company was able to make their own stock, and to supply hundreds of other houses with their manufactures, shipping paper by the trainload from their several mills. Bradner Smith & Co. commenced manufacturing in 1854 at Rockton, Illinois. Its purchased a Winnebago mill, which manufactured ten tons per day of express, manilla, rag, and straw wrapping paper. Their other manufactories were the Ledyard Pulp Mill, at Ledyard, Wisconsin, which made four tons of dry pulp per day; the Rozet Mill, at Three Rivers, which produced four tons per day of print and book paper; the Tippecanoe Paper Mill, at Monticello, Indiana. which made two tons of print paper daily, the Marinette Mill, at the place of the same name in Wisconsin, manufactured five tons of print paper, and the mill at Menominee, Michigan, which produced four tons of manilla paper and six tons of wood pulp daily.

== Products ==
Besides their own manufactories, Bradner Smith & Co. carried wedding and other stationery, imported and domestic, the Hurlbut plate paper, Crane's pure linen flats, the Germanic flat and ledger papers, and all other classes of goods used by stationers, printers, book-binders, and publication houses. Regular sizes and standard weights were stocked, but special sizes and weights could be made to order and furnished at mill prices. A stock of colored papers was on hand, and specialized papers for special purposes would be made to order in quantities to suit. They were also manufacturers of map paper, and furnished any weight or size requested. In cover papers, Bradner Smith & Co. had the largest and best-assorteded stock in the US.

The firm was an agent for the sale of Weston's linen ledger and record papers, which received awards at the Paris Exposition and the Centennial Exposition. They were also agents for commercial safety paper used for checks, notes, bills of exchange, bonds, and letters of credit, which was used by clearing-house authorities in US cities.

Bradner Smith & Co. used the finest inks, which were known for their brilliancy of color and durability. They also carried a full line of all colors, sizes, and styles of envelopes, and made odd sizes to order. All kinds of fancy stationery and stationers' sundries were kept in stock, and also a full line of illustrated advertising cards, manufactured by Marques, Gair & Bailey, of Paris, London, and New York City.

== Bibliography ==
- Inter Ocean Publishing Company (1883). Chicago's First Half Century, 1833-1883: The City as it was Fifty Years Ago, and as it is Today : the Trade, Commerce, Manufactories, Railroads, Banks, Wholesale and Retail Houses, Theaters, Hotels, Churches, and School (Public domain ed.). Chicago: Inter Ocean Publishing Company.
