= Sarah Aristidou =

French operatic soprano (born 1991)

- Born: 1991 (age 34–35); Paris, France
- Other name: Sarah Mzali-Aristidou
- Education: Maîtrise de Radio France; Sorbonne; Conservatoire à rayonnement régional de Paris; Universität der Künste Berlin; University of Music and Performing Arts Munich
- Occupation: Operatic soprano
- Awards: Belmont Prize
- Website: www.sarah-aristidou.com

Sarah Aristidou, or Sarah Mzali-Aristidou (born 1991) is a French operatic soprano who has performed internationally. She is interested in contemporary music and has appeared in world premieres. Composers such as Aribert Reimann and Jörg Widmann have written music for her.

== Life and career ==
Born in Paris, Aristidou began her musical training as a member of the Maîtrise de Radio France. She studied musicology at the Sorbonne and graduated in music theory at the Conservatoire à rayonnement régional de Paris in 2011. Beginning in 2010, she studied singing at the Universität der Künste Berlin, and from 2014 at the University of Music and Performing Arts Munich. She received her master's degree at the Bayerische Theaterakademie August Everding.

Aristidou appeared in world premieres of contemporary music by composers such as Wolfgang Rihm, Jörg Widmann and Manfred Trojahn. Aribert Reimann composed Cinq Fragments français de Rainer Maria Rilke especially for her voice, and she premiered it in 2015 at the Liederwerkstatt of the Kissinger Sommer festival.

She has worked with conductors such as Daniel Barenboim, Trevor Pinnock and Simon Rattle, and with orchestras including the Berliner Philharmoniker, Deutsches Symphonie-Orchester Berlin and the Gürzenich Orchestra. She was a member of the international opera studio of the Berlin State Opera from 2017 to 2019. In the 2020/21 season, she appeared at the State Opera as Zerbinetta in Ariadne auf Naxos, and performed at the Heidelberger Frühling and the Salzburg Festival.

== Recordings ==
Aristidou's debut CD appeared in 2021, titled Æther, with works by Edgar Varèse, Francis Poulenc, Leo Delibes, Ambroise Thomas, Jörg Widmann, Claude Debussy, Igor Strawinsky, Thomas Adès, George Frideric Handel and Udo Zimmermann, with pianist Daniel Barenboim, flutist Emmanuel Pahud, guitarist Christian Rivet, the Chor der Klangverwaltung and Orchester des Wandels conducted by Thomas Guggeis. Widmann's Labyrinth V was written for the singer, and the wordless piece contains "ululations, sobs, jazz inflections and wild laughter", according to a reviewer from Gramophone.

Her second album Enigma has been released in 2023, with works by Andreas Tsiartas, Sergei Rachmaninoff, Franz Schubert, Olivier Messiaen, Hugo Wolf, Maurice Ravel, and Jörg Widmann.

=== Other recordings ===
- Larcher, Thomas; Aristidou, Sarah; Weilerstein, Alisa; Pilsan, Aaron; Juhart, Luka; Schuldt, Clemens; Schuen, Andrè; Heide, Daniel; Münchner Kammerorchester (2023), The living mountain, München: ECM Records, OCLC 1413289906
- Aristidou, Sarah; F. Sias, Tony; Welser-Möst, Franz; The Cleveland Orchestra (2026), Ustvolskaya: Symphony No. 5 - Poulenc: La voix humaine

Aristidou also released an EP in 2021, title S'Agapo, with Cypriot folksongs arranged by Kaan Bulak and remixed by DJs Ricardo Villalobos and Ale Hop.

=== Videos ===
- Larcher, Thomas; Gösweiner, Friederike; Boder, Michael; Markovics, Karl; Breisach, Felix; Aristidou, Sarah; Vermeulen, Olivia; Tritschler, Robin; Schuen, Andrè; Peri, Giulia; Ensemble Modern; Schola Heidelberg (2020), Das Jagdgewehr = The hunting gun (in German), Berlin: C Major Entertainment GmbH, OCLC 1226371356

== Awards ==
- 2021 Luitpold Prize
- 2022 Belmont Prize
