= Violin Concerto No. 2 (Widmann) =

2018 composition by Jörg Widmann

- by Jörg Widmann
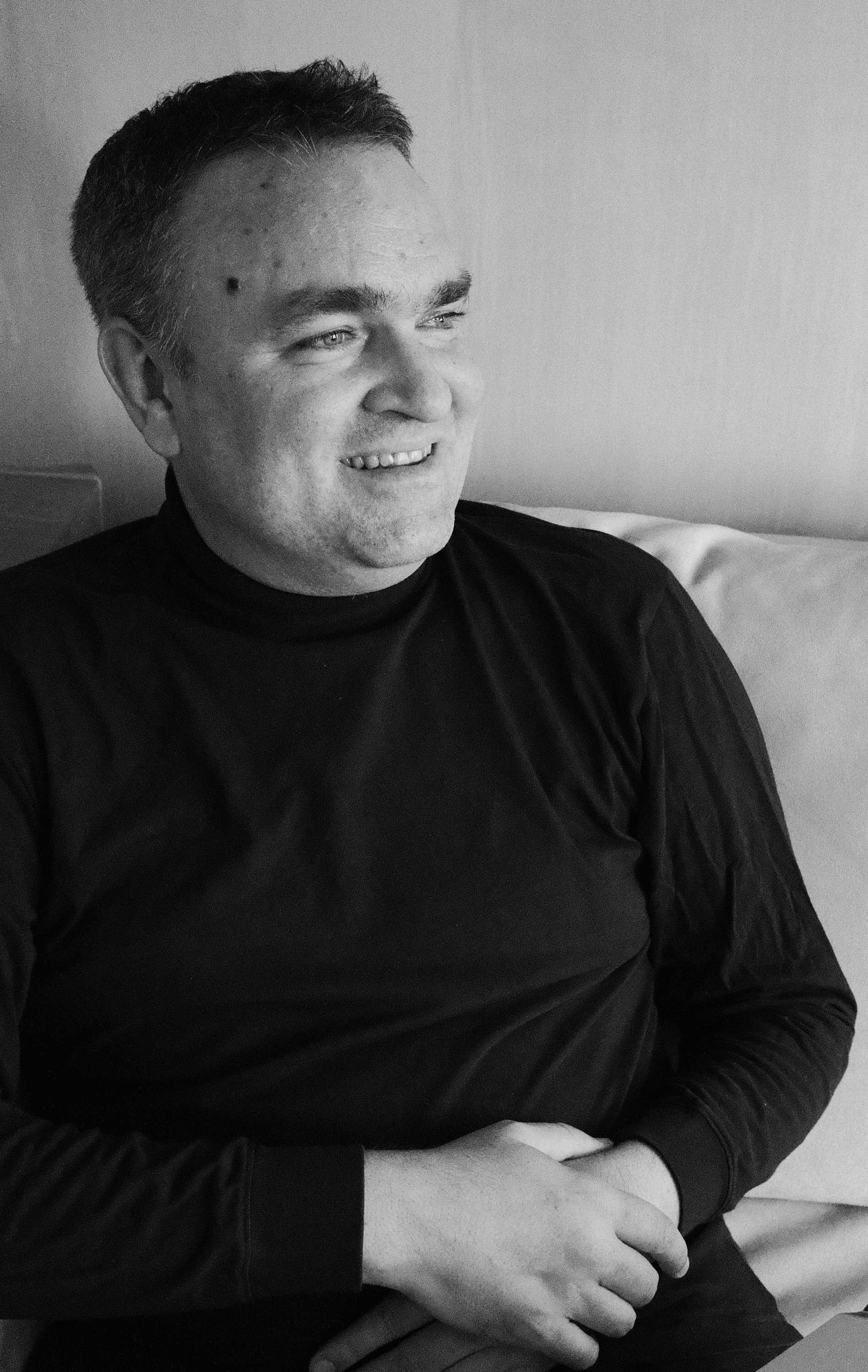
- The composer in 2025
- Period: Contemporary
- Genre: Concerto
- Commissioned by: Suntory Hall; Orchestre de Paris; Frankfurt Radio Symphony
- Composed: 2018
- Published: 2018: Mainz
- Publisher: Schott Music
- Duration: 35:00
- Movements: 3

Premiere
- Date: 31 August 2018
- Location: Suntory Hall, Tokyo
- Conductor: Jörg Widmann
- Performers: Carolin Widmann; Tokyo Metropolitan Symphony Orchestra

Jörg Widmann's Violin Concerto No. 2 was composed in 2018 for his sister Carolin Widmann. The work premiered on 31 August 2018 with soloist Carolin Widmann and Tokyo Metropolitan Symphony Orchestra conducted by Jörg Widmann at Suntory Hall, Tokyo. The concerto is dedicated to Carolin Widmann ("für Caro") and was commissioned by Suntory Hall, Orchestre de Paris and Frankfurt Radio Symphony.

== History ==
Carolin and Jörg Widmann played music together as children. They re-enacted operas with cuddly toys. Widmann was asking his younger sister to try extended techniques on her violin; her response: "You are crazy!" Later Carolin has made an international career and often played standard Classical and Romantic repertoire.

For the composer, the concerto was an "exercise in reduction".

== Structure ==
The concerto has traditional three movements and lasts 35 minutes.

1. Una ricerca
2. Romanze
3. Mobile

The limited thematic material is varied. With the violin as narrator, the work contains personal statements. The short first movement Una ricerca is a search of the violin for itself, for its own voice. The extensive second movement Romanze crosses several "emotional zones". This is manifested by the citation of virtuoso Romantic and Late-Romantic violin concertos, the English ballad Scarborough Fair and a French chanson. In the short final movement, Mobile, the former violin singing tends to splinter.

== Instrumentation ==
The concerto employed woodwinds, brass, percussion, strings, and a harp and celesta:

- Woodwinds: 3 flutes (all doubling piccolo), 3 oboes (3rd doubling cor anglais), 3 clarinets in A (2nd doubling bass clarinet in B♭, 3rd doubling contrabass clarinet in B♭), 3 bassoons (3rd doubling contra bassoon)
- Brass: 4 horns in F, 3 trumpets in C, 3 trombones, tuba
- Percussion: timpani, percussion (3 players)
- Strings: 12 violins I, 10 violins II, 8 violas, 6 violoncellos, 6 double basses (all with 5 strings with B as lowest string)
- Harp, celesta

== Performances ==
The premiere took place at Suntory Hall, Tokyo, followed by performances in Europe with Orchestre de Paris and Swedish Radio Symphony Orchestra under Daniel Harding and Frankfurt Radio Symphony at the Alte Oper under Andrés Orozco-Estrada. The UK premier occurred on 15 May 2025 at BBC Hoddinott Hall, Cardiff. The BBC National Orchestra of Wales was conducted by Jörg Widmann with Carolin Widmann on violin.

== Reception ==
Sofia Nyblom of Svenska Dagbladet wrote: "theatrical premiere that combines existential precociousness with childlike innocence" ("teatralt uruppförande som förenar existentiell brådmognad med barnslig oskuld"). Rian Evens from The Guardian titled in a five star review: "explosive, inquisitive and exhilarating concerto is a family affair".
