= Armand Phillip Bartos =

American architect (1910–2005)

Armand Phillip Bartos (1910 – December 29, 2005) was an American architect and philanthropist.

Though active as a philanthropist, Bartos became primarily known as the co-designer of Shrine of the Book that houses the Dead Sea Scrolls in western Jerusalem. Bartos's various and diverse activities, primarily not architecturally focused, included service as the chairperson emeritus of the SculptureCenter, Long Island City, Queens, New York.

== Education ==
In 1934, Bartos received a bachelor's degree in architecture from the University of Pennsylvania and, in 1935, a master's degree in architecture from the Massachusetts Institute of Technology (MIT).

== Family ==
He divorced his first wife to Martha (née Voice Bartos) and subsequently was married to heiress Celeste (née Gottesman, 1913–2013), who had in 1935 married Jerome John Altman. The Bartoses became generous philanthropists, concentrating on culture, particularly twentieth-century art of which they were avid collectors, filling their Park Avenue apartment in New York City. Celeste became fabulously wealthy as a result of inheriting the estate of her father, Samuel Gottesman (1885–1956), a Hungarian émigré who had become a pulp-paper merchant and financier.

With Celeste, Bartos had a son, Adam, and, from his first marriage, had sons, Armand Jr. and Michael, and daughter Mary Bartos. Through his marriage to Celeste, his stepdaughter was Jenifer Altman (1941–1991), also a philanthropist and a victim of cancer, and stepson Jonathan Altman. He was the great-uncle of physician and film producer, Shoshana R. Ungerleider.

Armand P. Bartos died at his home in Manhattan on December 29, 2005. He was 95.

== Architecture ==
From 1957 to 1962, Bartos was an architecture partner of Frederick John Kiesler (1890–1965), an odd association considering that Bartos was pragmatic and mild-mannered and Kiesler was unorthodox and cerebral. Nevertheless, Bartos joined Kiesler in minor projects, such as a two-story art gallery in New York's Carlyle Hotel as an early realization of Kiesler's "Endless House" concept. "The Struggle for New Forms" was the 1957 inaugural exhibition there.

Their highest-profile commission, never to be equaled or surpassed by either of them together or separately, was the Shrine of the Book, completed in 1965 in Jerusalem. It was funded by a foundation established by Samuel Gottesman's family to honor him. It, after all, was to house the scrolls that Gottesman himself had purchased as a gift to the State of Israel. However, numerous Israeli architects were miffed by Bartos's participation due to his being an American and, especially, having been chosen through nepotism, though he was Jewish. Kiesler, also Jewish, was even less acceptable to the Israeli architectural establishment, based on his having never finished his architecture studies in Vienna and having built nothing.

About the structure—cited as the best of 1965 by the American Institute of Architects (AIA)—Bartos offered: "The scrolls are not visual as a Rembrandt is visual. Only scholars can actually decipher them. It was up to us [Kiesler and me] to say something about them. [Thus] we built up an air of mystery".

From 1962, he was the principal partner of Armand Bartos & Associates in New York City. The practice designed Belfer Hall (1968) and a number of other buildings at Yeshiva University in New York City, Fronczak Hall (1976) at the State University of New York at Buffalo/SUNY, and others.

== Philanthropy ==
In the early 1990s at the Massachusetts Institute of Technology, the Bartoses gave US$100,000 toward the Rotch Library expansion project in the School of Architecture building and donated $1 million for the establishment of The Celeste and Armand Bartos Visualization Center, a classroom facility completed in 1999. And there have been the Celeste Bartos Forum auditorium and, 2002, the Bartoses paid $8.5 million for the Celeste and Armand Bartos Education Center, both within the New York Public Library. The Bartoses have been generous contributors to the library throughout the years as well as to other institutions, such as The Museum of Modern Art, Art Institute of Chicago, and Bartos Institute for the Constructive Engagement of Conflict, in the Montezuma Castle (Daniel Burnham, architect), Montezuma, New Mexico.
