= Milica Djordjevic =

Serbian composer

- Born: 1984 (age 41–42); Belgrade, Serbia
- Education: University of Belgrade; Conservatoire de Strasbourg; IRCAM
- Occupation: Composer
- Website: www.milicadjordjevic.com

Milica Djordjevic or Đorđević (born 1984), is a composer of contemporary classical music. She won the Belmont Prize for New Music from the Forberg-Schneider Foundation in 2015.

== Early life and education ==
Djordjević grew up in Belgrade, Serbia. As a young child she hoped to become a concert pianist or a painter. She went to classical gymnasium and specialized music school.

During teenage years she seriously considered a career in physics, theatre or art. Both painting and physics are still an important part of composer's life: her first impulse for sound representation, i.e. the notation, is a drawing and physics is inextricably linked to music.

Djordjević composition from the faculty of music in Belgrade. She was a postgraduate student at the Conservatoire de Strasbourg, where she studied with Ivan Fedele. She then studied composition and computer music Cursus1 at IRCAM, Paris, and Berlin, where she finished 3rd cycle studies at HfM Hanns Eisler in the class of Hanspeter Kyburz.

She currently lives in Cologne.

== Career ==
Some of the examples of this very broad field of interest and inspiration are The Death of the Star-Knower – petrified echoes of an epitaph in a kicked crystal of time I&II from 2008/09: Djordjević fantasized about the concept of time crystals and worked with this idea in her first two sting quartets The Death of the Star-Knower – petrified echoes of an epitaph in a kicked crystal of time I&II from 2008/09. The concept of time crystals only became known in physics a few years later and was theoretically proposed by Frank Wilczek in 2012 and in terms of practical application, time crystals could one day be used as quantum computer storage.

Čvor for winds, brass, percussion and piano was finished in the neonatal intensive care unit (NICU).

Mit o Ptici for choir and orchestra has the most direct inspiration in literature – verse epos Bird by Miroslav Antić, whereas Jadarit, Concerto for Percussion and String Orchestra is politically engaged.

Since 2025, Djordjević has been professor for composition at the Lübeck Academy of Music.

Djordjević's music is described as "rough, often even raw in the gesture", as a "vital tonal language that refuses less harmony and beautiful sound than that it gives the experience of the elemental quite pleasurably: tones of the earth’s emanations."

=== Awards ===
| Year | Nominee / work | Award | Result |
|---|---|---|---|
| 2015 | New Music from the Forberg-Schneider Foundation | Belmont Prize | Won |
| 2016 | | Ernst von Siemens Composer Prize | Won |
| 2017 | German Music Council (Deutscher Musikrat) | Preis der deutschen Schallplattenkritik | Won |
| 2020 | Berlin Philharmonic | Claudio Abbado Composition Prize | Won |
| 2023 | | German Music Authors' Prize for orchestra competition | Nominated |

== Music ==
The music of Milica Djordjević is characterized by its contemporary style and expressive intensity. Her work incorporates elements from the Balkans alongside avant-garde techniques, distinct from traditional folk music. The compositions feature rhythmic structures and a physical presence. The music addresses themes that are often hidden or suppressed, focusing on direct expression rather than aesthetic ornamentation.

Djordjević's works are present at major European festivals, concert series and radio stations and are performed by renowned performers, ensembles and orchestras such as Berliner Philharmoniker, Arditti Quartet, Bavarian Radio Symphony Orchestra, WDR Symphony Orchestra, SWR Symphony Orchestra, Munich Chamber Orchestra, Ensemble Musikfabrik, ensemble modern, Ensemble Recherche, JACK Quartet, Neue Vocalsolisten, Peter Rundel, Marco Blaauw, Ilan Volkov, Luca Pfaff, Teodoro Anzellotti, Enno Poppe, Alexander Liebreich, Peter Veale, Bas Wiegers, Clemens Schuldt, Sylvio Gualda, Francesco Dillon...

== Works ==
=== Large ensemble and orchestra ===
- The Firefly in a Jar for chamber orchestra (2007)
- The Firefly in a Jar II' for symphony orchestra (2008)
- Put belih kostiju [The journey of a weather-beaten skeleton] for symphony orchestra (2009)
- ZAPIS for 12 percussionists (2013)
- Sky Limited for string orchestra (2014)
- Quicksilver for symphony orchestra (2016)
- Mit o ptici for choir and orchestra (2020)
- Čvor for winds, brass, percussion and piano (2021)
- O drveću, nežnosti, Mesecu... for orchestra (2022)
- Jadarit concerto for percussion and string orchestra (2022)
- Nalet for large ensemble (2023)
- Mali svitac, žestoko ozaren i prestravljen nesnošljivom lepotom [Little Firefly, fiercely illuminated and terrified by unbearable beauty] for symphony orchestra (2023) Commissioned by the Berliner Philharmoniker Foundation on the occasion of the Philharmonie’s 60th birthday (2023)

=== Chamber ===
- The Death of the Star-Knower, petrified echoes of an epitaph in a kicked crystal of time I (2008)
- The Death of the Star-Knower, petrified echoes of an epitaph in a kicked crystal of time II (2009)
- How to evade? (2011)
- Phosphorescence (2014)
- Rdja (2015)
- Indigo (2017)
- Pod vodom raskršća snova (2019)
- INDIGO R-offprint 1 for string quartet (2020)
- transfixed (2020)
- transfixed (2022)
- FAIL again for e-violin and e-organ (2022)

=== Solo ===
- FAIL (2010)
- umeš li ti da laješ? – ne-komunikacja za solo kontrabas [do you know how to bark? – non-communication for Double bass solo] (2010/11)
- ...mislio bi čovek: zvezde [...würde man denken: Sterne] (2015)
- Pomen II (2018)
- Nailing Clouds (2019)
- Role-playing 1: strings attached (2019)
- Jadarit II (2023)
- Treperenje, studija I [Flicker, study I] (2023)
- Nailing clouds II (2023)

=== Vocal ===
- Manje te u majke groze [one less horror for your mother] for soprano, bass clarinet, accordion, violin, viola and violoncello (2011)
- Kakva mi je to pa igra for voice and percussion (2014)
- I ti hoćeš da se volimo [Und du willst dass wir uns lieben] for soprano and accordion (2015)
- Hladan ti dah do grla for voice and ensemble (2016)
