= Florent Boffard =

French classical pianist and pedagogue

Florent Boffard (born in 1964) is a French classical pianist and pedagogue.

== Biography ==
Boffard received his first musical training at the Conservatoire National de Région de Lyon. In 1976, he was a pupil of Yvonne Loriod's piano class at the Conservatoire de Paris, where he obtained a first prize. He completed his piano studies with Germaine Mounier. He also studied chamber music with Geneviève Joy.

From 1988 to 1999, he was a member of the Ensemble Intercontemporain, with whom he created numerous works by contemporary composers such as Franco Donatoni, György Ligeti, Klaus Huber, Philippe Fénelon and Michael Jarrell. Among others, he played Boulez's Structures for two pianos (with Pierre-Laurent Aimard) and Luciano Berio's Sequenza IV. With Isabelle Faust, he recorded Bartok's Sonata for violin and piano No. 2. In 2001, he released a recording of Debussy's and Bartók's works for piano for Harmonia Mundi.

As a concert pianist, Boffard has performed at festivals in Salzburg, Berlin, Bath and Brussels, among others and has worked with conductors such as Pierre Boulez, Simon Rattle, Leon Fleisher and David Robertson.

Since 1997 he has been a professor at the Conservatoire National Supérieur de Musique et de Danse de Lyon, until 2016 when he began teaching at the Conservatoire de Paris. In 2001, the Forberg-Schneider Foundation awarded him the Belmont Prize for his contribution to contemporary music.

== Recordings ==
- Arnold Schönberg's complete work for piano (éd. Mirare);
- Claude Debussy's Études
- Béla Bartók's 2nd Sonata for violin and piano, with Isabelle Faust
- Pierre Boulez's Structures for two pianos, with Pierre-Laurent Aimard
- Luciano Berio's Sequenza IV.
