= Carolin Widmann =

German violinist (born 1976)

- Born: 1976 (age 49–50); Munich, Germany
- Occupation: Classical violinist
- Website: www.carolinwidmann.com

Carolin Widmann (German: [kaʁoˈliːn ˈviːtman]; born 1976) is a German classical violinist. Widmann plays a violin made in 1782 by Giovanni Battista Guadagnini.

== Career ==
Born in Munich, Widmann studied with Igor Ozim in Cologne, Michèle Auclair in Boston and David Takeno in London. As a soloist she has been conducted by Sir Roger Norrington, Sylvain Cambreling, Heinz Holliger, Riccardo Chailly, Sir Simon Rattle, Vladimir Jurowski, Daniel Harding and Esa-Pekka Salonen. She has collaborated with composers such as Pierre Boulez, Peter Eötvös, Erkki-Sven Tüür, Wolfgang Rihm, Salvatore Sciarrino, Enno Poppe and Rebecca Saunders, who have written several works especially for her. She has performed with orchestras such as Berlin Philharmonic Orchestra, London Symphony Orchestra, Orchestre de Paris, Royal Stockholm Philharmonic Orchestra, Sydney Symphony Orchestra or Los Angeles Philharmonic Orchestra.

Since October 2006 she has been Professor of Violin at the University of Music and Theatre Leipzig. From 2012 to 2015 she ran the Sommerliche Musiktage Hitzacker, Germany's oldest chamber music festival.

At the Salzburg Mozartwoche of 2009, Widmann performed chamber music by Boulez with her brother, clarinetist and composer Jörg Widmann, and pianist Hideki Nagano. She attracted attention with her collaboration in gefaltet, a "Choreographic concert" organised by Sasha Waltz and Mark Andre, with which the International Mozarteum Foundation opened their Mozartwoche of 2012. A 2012 recording of Schubert's works for violin and piano with Alexander Lonquich received critical acclaim. With her brother and pianist Dénes Várjon she played a concert at the Rheingau Musik Festival when Jörg Widmann was artist in residence in 2014. From 2017 to 2024 she was a member of the board of trustees of the Ernst von Siemens Musikstiftung.

Carolin Widmann premiered in 2018 Jörg Widmann's Violin Concerto No. 2 at Suntory Hall, Tokyo.

== Awards ==
- 1998 Prix du President at the "Concours International Yehudi Menuhin," Boulogne-sur-Mer
- 1999 International Violin Competition: "Georg Kulenkampff", Cologne
- 2001 International Jeunesses Musicales Contest, Belgrade
- 2004 Belmont Prize of the Forberg-Schneider-Stiftung for excellence in contemporary music
- 2006 Annual Preis der deutschen Schallplattenkritik (for the debut album "Reflections")
- 2010 Diapason d'Or (for "Phantasy of Spring"), Preis der deutschen Schallplattenkritik (Chamber music category for "Phantasy of Spring")
- 2013 'Artist of the Year' at the International Classical Music Awards
- 2014 Schneider-Schott Music Prize of the City of Mainz
- 2017 Bayerischer Musikpreis
- 2020 Duisburger Musikpreis

=== Scholarships ===
- 2009 Villa Massimo

=== Memberships ===
- 2021 Sächsische Akademie der Künste

== Discography ==
- 2006 Carolin Widmann: "Reflections" (Debut album) OCLC 1390603720
- 2008 Carolin Widmann / Dénes Várjon: Schumann – Violin Sonatas OCLC 931376909
- 2009 Carolin Widmann / Simon Lepper: Phantasy of Spring – Feldman, Zimmermann, Schoenberg OCLC 1085513016
- 2009 Carolin Widmann / Jörg Widmann / Nordic Symphony Orchestra / Anu Tali: Erkki-Sven Tüür, Strata OCLC 1184264664
- 2012 Alexander Lonquich / Carolin Widmann: Franz Schubert – Fantasie C-Dur / Rondo h-moll / Sonate A-Dur OCLC 1085513699
- 2012 Carolin Widmann / SWR Sinfonieorchester Baden-Baden und Freiburg / Eivind Gullberg Jensen: Wolfgang Rihm, Coll'Arco OCLC 1047877401
- 2013 Carolin Widmann / Frankfurt RSO / Pomarico: Morton Feldman – Violin and Orchestra (composed 1979) OCLC 859564255
- 2015 Carolin Widmann / London Philharmonic Orchestra, Direction Vladimir Jurowski: Julian Anderson: In lieblicher Bläue OCLC 1137547183
- 2016 Carolin Widmann / Chamber Orchestra of Europe: Mendelssohn, Schumann: Violin concertos OCLC 1186549276
- 2016 Martin Helmchen / Carolin Widmann / David McCarroll / Pauline Sachse / Marie-Elisabeth Hecker: Edward Elgar: Piano Quintet a minor op. 84 OCLC 1048599907
- 2017 Carolin Widmann / Orchestre National des Pays de la Loire / Pascal Rophe: Pascal Dusapin: Violin concerto "Aufgang", Label BIS OCLC 1089804953
- 2019 Carolin Widmann / Sergei Nakariakov / Giuliano Sommerhalder / Vocalconsort Berlin / Symphonieorchester des Bayerischen Rundfunks: Peter Ruzicka: ... Inseln, Randlos... for violin, chamber choir and orchestra; Label Neos OCLC 1433283813
- 2020 Carolin Widmann / Ilan Volkov / Symphonieorchester des Bayerischen Rundfunks: Rebecca Saunders: Still/Aether/Alba; Label BRmedia
- 2021 Carolin Widmann / Jörg Widmann, Pierre Boulez, SWR Experimentalstudio: Pierre Boulez: Anthèmes 1&2; Label CPO
- 2022 Carolin Widmann: works for solo violin by Eugène Ysaÿe, George Benjamin, Hildegard von Bingen, George Enescu and Johann Sebastian Bach; Label ECM records
