= Edgar Wachenheim III =

American businessman

- Born: 1937 (age 88–89); New York City
- Education: Massachusetts Institute of Technology; Williams College (B.A., 1959); Harvard Business School (MBA, 1966)
- Occupation: Investor
- Notable work: Common Stocks and Common Sense (2016)
- Spouse: Sue Wachenheim (m. 1962)
- Children: 4

Edgar Wachenheim III (born 1937) is an American investor and CEO and chairman of Greenhaven Associates. He founded that investment company, a former branch of Central National-Gottesman, in 1987 and has worked there since as CEO. Greenhaven Associates had reported assets under management of at least $10 billion in 2025. CNBC reported Wachenheim's firm had an average annual return before fees of about 19 percent between 1988 and 2017.

Wachenheim wrote a book about his career and investing methods called Common Stocks and Common Sense, published in 2016. A second edition was published in 2022. His investment strategies can be described as contrarian and value-oriented with a long-term time horizon.

== Early life and career ==
Wachenheim was born in 1937 in New York City as the son of Edgar Wachenheim Jr. and Betty Lewis Wachenheim. He has one brother, and he grew up in New Rochelle, New York. Wachenheim studied at MIT for two years as an undergraduate, and thereafter went to Williams College, graduating in 1959. After that, Wachenheim worked at IBM before attending Harvard Business School, where he earned the degree Master of Business Administration, between 1964 and 1966. He subsequently worked at Goldman Sachs as a securities analyst.

In 1969, Wachenheim took a job at the investment division of Central National-Gottesman (CNG), a company led by his in-laws, under Arthur Ross. When Ross retired in 1979, Wachenheim became the head of the investment division. Greenhaven Associates was founded by him in 1987 when the investment branch was spun off from CNG. It remained based in Purchase, New York. During the first few years, Greenhaven Associates exclusively invested wealth owned by CNG and the Wachenheim family, but later accepted new clients such as affluent families, university endowments, and nonprofit organizations. The value of the assets under management of the firm compounded over the years, from $300 million in 1991 to $1 billion in 1998, $2.7 billion in 2004, and almost $11 billion today.

In July 2018, Wachenheim was interviewed by CNBC's Jim Cramer during the New York City investors conference "Delivering Alpha". The event was hosted by CNBC and the magazine Institutional Investor.

Wachenheim is also the vice chairman of the board of Central National-Gottesman. Previously, he has also been on the board of directors of public companies.

== Common Stocks and Common Sense ==
Wachenheim wrote a book about investing, published in April 2016 by Wiley, called Common Stocks and Common Sense: The Strategies, Analyses, Decisions, and Emotions of a Particularly Successful Value Investor. In the book, he describes his strategies as a value investor and discusses cases from his career. Wachenheim tells that he invests in common stocks of companies he believes are undervalued by the market and face a small likelihood of permanent loss. He aims to achieve an annual return of between 15% and 20%. Wachenheim usually holds the stocks for multiple years until the predicted appreciation has occurred. In the book, he reasons that if his thesis about a stock is wrong he still has an expected positive return, as the stock market has had an average annual return of 9% to 10% over the last decades. Wachenheim strongly considers downside and permanent loss of capital when choosing investments. Wachenheim also wrote a chapter of the 2017 book Harriman's New Book of Investing Rules. A new, second edition of Wachenheim's book was released in 2022.

== Non-profit work and philanthropy ==
Over the years, Wachenheim has been on a number of boards of trustees of nonprofit organizations. He was board president of Rye Country Day School and a member of the Skidmore College board, where three of his children studied, between 1993 and 2001. He also served as vice-chair of the college's board and chair of its investment committee until 2003. Wachenheim is involved with Williams College, his alma mater, where the newest science center is named in his honor.

Wachenheim became a life trustee of the New York Public Library, where the Trustees Room is named in his honor, after having chaired both the executive and investment committees. He was chair of the board of the PBS affiliate WNET from 2017 to 2022. Wachenheim became chair the year after he had joined WNET's board, succeeding James S. Tisch. As of December 2025, he sits on the board of trustees of the New York City Museum of Modern Art.

He has also been on the boards of UJA-Federation of New York, the New York Foundation (1990–1999), and the Arthur Ross Foundation.

Wachenheim and his wife have a charitable organization called the "Sue & Edgar Wachenheim Foundation". The organization reported assets were $438 million in 2022. A large portion of the contributions have gone to cultural and educational institutions including Williams College, Skidmore College, the Museum of Modern Art, WNET, the New York Public Library, the Jay Heritage Center and others.

== Personal life ==
Wachenheim is married to Sue Wachenheim (née Wallach) since June 6, 1962, and they reside in Rye, New York. They have four children and six grandchildren.
