= Pauline Sachse =

German violist

Pauline Sachse (born 1980) is a German violist, chamber musician, and professor at the University of Music and Theatre Leipzig.

== Life ==
Born in Hamburg, Sachse received violin lessons from 1988 and began playing the viola in 1992. She studied with Tabea Zimmermann first at the Frankfurt University of Music and Performing Arts, and since 2002 at the Hochschule für Musik Hanns Eisler Berlin. In 2003, she also studied at Yale University in the US with Jesse Livine and Peter Oundjian. Her chamber music partners include among others Isabelle Faust, Stella Doufexis, Lauma Skride, Harriet Krijgh, Janine Jansen and Tabea Zimmermann. From 2010 to 2014, Sachse was principal violist with the Berlin Radio Symphony Orchestra. Sachse taught viola at the Hochschule für Musik Hanns Eisler Berlin most recently as a visiting professor, and in 2013 followed the call to the Hochschule für Musik Carl Maria von Weber in Dresden. In 2019, she took over the professorship for viola at the Lübeck Academy of Music (successor to Barbara Westphal). Sachse performs regularly at festivals, such as the Salzburg Festival, the Moritzburg Festival, the Schwetzingen Festival, the Rheingau Musik Festival, the Schubertiade Vorarlberg, the Spannungen festival in Heimbach and the Festival Mecklenburg-Vorpommern. She has performed worldwide and played in music centres such as the Wigmore Hall, the Konzerthaus, Vienna and the Berliner Philharmonie.

== Awards ==
- 1998: Hans Sikorski Memorial Prize of the German Foundation for Musical Life.

== Recordings ==
- Schwanengesang, Schubert and Shostakovich with Lauma Skride − Label AVI.
- Märchenbilder, Viola Tales, Schumann and Hindemith with Daniel Heide − Label: ARS.
- Hamlet Echoes with Stella Doufexis and Daniel Heide − Label AVI.
- Adolph Busch Chamber Music, Eisler Quartet and Wolfgang Meyer − Label AVI.
- Mozart & Weber & Bliss: Clarinet Quintets, Eisler Quartet and Wolfgang Meyer − Label AVI.
- Chamber Music, Weber, Saint-Saëns, Klughardt, Krein, Soloists of the Spannungen Festival − Label AVI.
- Brahms, Violin Concerto, Sextet no. 2, with Isabelle Faust − Label Harmonia Mundi.
- Viola Galante with Andreas Hecker – Label AVI.
- Elgar Quintett with Carolin Widmann, David McCarroll, Marie-Elisabeth Hecker and Martin Helmchen – Label Alpha.
