= Jerusalem Quartet =

String quartet

The Jerusalem Quartet is an Israeli string quartet, which made its debut in 1996. Their performance repertoire is wide and includes works of Joseph Haydn, Wolfgang Amadeus Mozart, Franz Schubert, Johannes Brahms, Claude Debussy, Maurice Ravel and Dmitri Shostakovich. They have toured extensively worldwide and three of their recordings have won BBC Music Magazine Awards.

They have recorded thirteen albums for the Harmonia Mundi label. The Jerusalem Quartet celebrated their 20th season in 2016 by releasing a two-CD album of Beethoven's six string quartets op. 18, and touring the United States, Australia, and several European countries.

== Members ==
The original line-up included the violist Amihai Grosz. Grosz joined the Berlin Philharmonic as a principal in 2010, and also plays with the Philharmonic Octet Berlin.

Violist Ori Kam left the group in October 2025. Two violists filled in for the 2025/26 season: Mathis Rochat on North American tours and Alexander Gordon for concerts in Europe and Israel. In May 2026, Gordon was appointed as the group's new violist.

=== Current Members ===
- Alexander Pavlovsky, first violin
- Sergei Bresler, second violin
- Alexander Gordon, viola
- Kyril Zlotnikov, cello; the instrument is loaned to him by Daniel Barenboim and was played by Jacqueline du Pré

=== Past Members ===
- Amihai Grosz, viola, until 2011.
- Ori Kam, viola, 2011–2025

== Protests ==
Due to the ensemble's name and their being perceived as cultural ambassadors for Israel, the Jerusalem Quartet has been subject to protests during their performances. In 2010, a performance at London's Wigmore Hall which was being broadcast live on BBC Radio 3 was disrupted by multiple hecklers. The broadcast had to be halted.
