= Hadassah Magazine =

American magazine

Hadassah Magazine is an American magazine published by the Hadassah Women's Zionist Organization of America. It covers Israel, the Jewish world, and subjects of interest to American Jewish women. It was established in 1914. Esther G. Gottesman a long-serving member of the Hadassah Board of Directors, is credited with developing the organization's newsletter into a widely respected, mass-circulation magazine. The periodical made the transition from a newsletter produced by volunteers, to a professional magazine staffed by salaried journalists in 1947 under the leadership of executive editor Jesse Z. Lurie, a journalist who had previously worked for the Palestine Post and who would edit Hadassah for the next 33 years.

The popular "Jewish Traveler" column began in 1983, with articles by an array of Jewish writers reporting on sites of Jewish interest in destinations worldwide. In 1986, when the magazine had a circulation of 385,000, Hadassah banned cigarette advertising. The magazine's chairman, Rose Goldman, told the New York Times that advertising tobacco was not "in keeping with the mission and philosophy of the organization."

== Ribalow Prize ==
The magazine annually awards the Ribalow Prize for a work of fiction on a Jewish theme.

== Books ==
Several collections of Hadassah articles were published as books.

- The Jewish Traveler: Hadassah Magazine's Guide to the World's Jewish Communities and Sights (1994)
- The Hadassah Magazine Jewish Parenting Book, edited by Roselyn Bell (Avon, 1991)
