= EastWest Institute =

Defunct American think tank

- Institute for EastWest Studies, Inc.
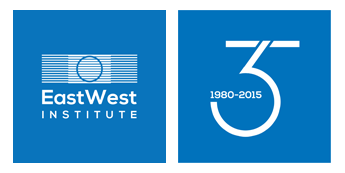
- 35th Anniversary Logo
- Formation: 1980; 46 years ago
- Founder: John Edwin Mroz; Ira D. Wallach
- Dissolved: January 31, 2021; 5 years ago
- Type: Public policy think tank
- Tax ID no.: 13-3091844
- Headquarters: 10 Grand Central, 155 E. 44th Street, Suite 1105
- Location: New York, NY
- President: Bruce W. McConnell
- Website: eastwest.ngo

The EastWest Institute (EWI), originally known as the Institute for East-West Security Studies and officially the Institute for EastWest Studies, Inc., was an international not-for-profit, non-partisan think tank focused on international conflict resolution through a variety of means, including track 2 diplomacy and track 1.5 diplomacy (conducted with the direct involvement of official actors), hosting international conferences, and authoring publications on international security issues. EWI employed networks in political, military, and business establishments in the United States, Europe, and the former Soviet Union.

EWI was founded by John Edwin Mroz and Ira D. Wallach in 1980 as an independent, global organization that promotes peace by creating trusted settings for candid, global discourse among leaders to tackle intractable security and stability challenges. Mroz served as president and CEO of the institute for 34 years until his death, in 2014.

The organization discontinued operations effective January 31, 2021. This decision was taken at the conclusion of a four-month strategic assessment in light of increasing challenges resulting from the global pandemic and related financial challenges facing many nonprofit organizations.

EWI's initiatives focused on a number of different areas including cybersecurity, preventive diplomacy, strategic trust-building (which encompasses Russia-United States relations and China-United States Relations), Economic Security, and Regional Security (focusing on specific areas such as Southwest Asia).

== History ==
The Institute for East-West Security Studies was founded in 1980, when then CEO John Edwin Mroz and Ira D. Wallach set out to study means of addressing areas of political dispute across the Iron Curtain.

In 1984, EWI hosted the first track 2 military-to-military discussions between the NATO and Warsaw Pact countries. These talks, focusing heavily on the establishment of confidence-building measures (CBMs) between the two parties, ultimately resulted in an agreement requiring each side to alert the other of troop movements.

After the fall of the Berlin Wall and the eruption of conflicts in Southeastern Europe, EWI worked to foster economic stability in the region, encouraging cross-border cooperation and training leaders for democratic states. In the 2000s (decade), EWI's operations expanded geographically to China, Southwest Asia and the Middle East, focusing on issues like cybersecurity, economic security, and countering violent extremism.

Since 2008, EWI has partnered with the China Association for International Friendly Contact to organize forums, termed the U.S.-China Sanya Initiative, between retired People's Liberation Army officers and retired U.S. military personnel. The Sanya Initiative is supported by the China-United States Exchange Foundation (CUSEF), a Hong Kong–based nonprofit established by billionaire Tung Chee-hwa.

In May 2009, EWI released its Joint Threat Assessment on Iran, produced by senior U.S. and Russian experts convened by the institute. The assessment, which concluded that the planned system would not protect against an Iranian nuclear threat, helped inform the Obama administration's decision to scrap the ballistic missile defense plan proposed by the Bush administration and replace it with a plan of its own.

In 2016, the institute helped set up an information portal which allows operators of critical infrastructure to share security information internationally.

== Publications ==
- Peter Rutland; EastWest Institute (New York, N.Y.) (1998). The Challenge of Integration. M.E. Sharpe. ISBN 978-0-7656-0359-3.
- Jonathan P. Stein; EastWest Institute (New York, N.Y.) (2000). The Politics of National Minority Participation in Post-communist Europe: State-building, Democracy, and Ethnic Mobilization. M.E. Sharpe. pp. 2–. ISBN 978-0-7656-0528-3.
- A. M. Lavrov; Alexei G. Makushkin; EastWest Institute (New York, N.Y.) (2001). The Fiscal Structure of the Russian Federation: Financial Flows Between the Center and the Regions. M.E. Sharpe. ISBN 978-0-7656-0713-3.
- Oleksandr Pavli͡uk; Ivanna Klympush-Tsintsadze; EastWest Institute (New York, N.Y.) (2004). The Black Sea Region: Cooperation and Security Building. M.E. Sharpe. ISBN 978-0-7656-1225-0.
