= Ruth Gottesman =

American educator (born 1930)

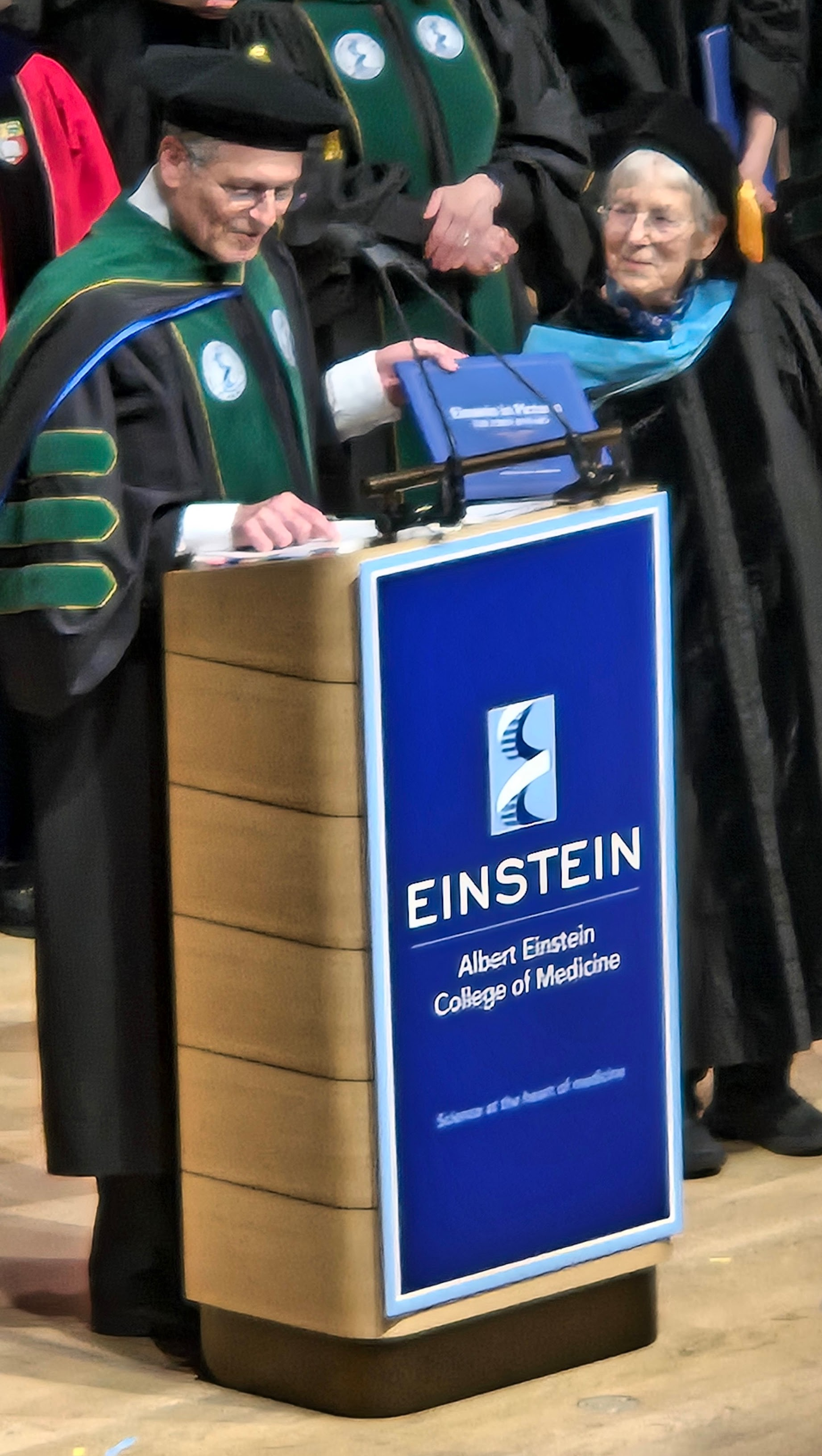
- Born: Ruth Levy; 1930 (age 95–96)
- Education: Barnard College (BA); Columbia University (MA, EdD)
- Spouse: David Gottesman (m. 1950; died 2022)
- Children: 3
- Scientific career
- Fields: Educational psychology
- Workplaces: Albert Einstein College of Medicine

Ruth Levy Gottesman (née Levy, born 1930) is an American educator. Gottesman is the chair of the board of trustees of the Albert Einstein College of Medicine (AECOM) in the Bronx, New York, and a long-time professor there. In February 2024, she donated $1 billion to AECOM to ensure that tuition would be free in perpetuity to all future students.

== Career ==
Born Ruth Levy, Gottesman graduated from Friends School of Baltimore in 1948. Later that year, she enrolled at Mount Holyoke College. She completed her bachelor's degree at Barnard College. Gottesman earned a master's degree in developmental education and a Doctor of Education in human cognition and learning in the area of educational psychology, both from Teachers College, Columbia University.

In 1968, Gottesman joined the Albert Einstein College of Medicine (AECOM) at the Children's Evaluation and Rehabilitation Center (CERC), where she developed widely used screening, evaluation, and treatment procedures for people with learning disabilities. In 1992, she founded the Adult Literacy Program at CERC, and in 1998, helped to found the Fisher Landau Center for the Treatment of Learning Disabilities. She is a professor emerita in the Department of Pediatrics (Developmental Medicine) and chair of the board of trustees at AECOM.

Gottesman joined AECOM's board of trustees in 2002 and served as chair of the board from 2007 until 2014. Following the death of her successor as chair, Roger W. Einiger, in 2020, she once again became chair. She has also been a member of the Montefiore Health System board of trustees since 2007. The main Montefiore hospital serves as a teaching hospital for the Einstein Medical College.

== Personal life ==
She married David Gottesman in 1950. They met in 1948 before she began her studies at Mount Holyoke College and remained married for 72 years. Together, they had three children. They lived in Rye, New York. Forbes valued David's estate at $3 billion at the time of his death.

== Philanthropy ==
With her husband David, she donated $25 million to the Albert Einstein College of Medicine in 2008, which was used to found the Ruth L. and David S. Gottesman Institute for Stem Cell and Regenerative Medicine Research, the Ruth L. Gottesman Clinical Skills Center, and the Faculty Scholar in Epigenetics at the College.

When David died in 2022, he bequeathed a portfolio of stock in Berkshire Hathaway to Ruth, with the instructions for her to do with it as she pleased. Gottesman, in February 2024, announced a $1 billion gift to AECOM to provide free tuition to all its students in perpetuity. The donation is the largest one in history given to a U.S. medical school.

== Honors ==
Gottesman was named in the 2024 TIME100 Health, a "community of leaders from across industries—scientists, doctors, advocates, educators, and policy-makers, among others—dedicated to creating tangible, credible change for a healthier population."
