= Fredrik Paulsson =

Swedish musician

Fredrik Paulsson is a Swedish violinist and violist.

In 1990, he was the winner of Unga Solister, a music competition for young musicians which is held annually in Helsingborg.

Also in 1990, Paulsson founded the Yggdrasil Quartet. This quartet won awards including the Worshipful Company of Musicians' Award at the 1994 London International String Quartet Competition in 1994, and the Melbourne International Chamber Music Competition.

As of 2011 Paulsson worked as a solo violinist, touring and performing at international music festivals, and was also a member of the Chamber Orchestra of Europe.
