= Maarten Jansen =

Dutch academic (born 1952)

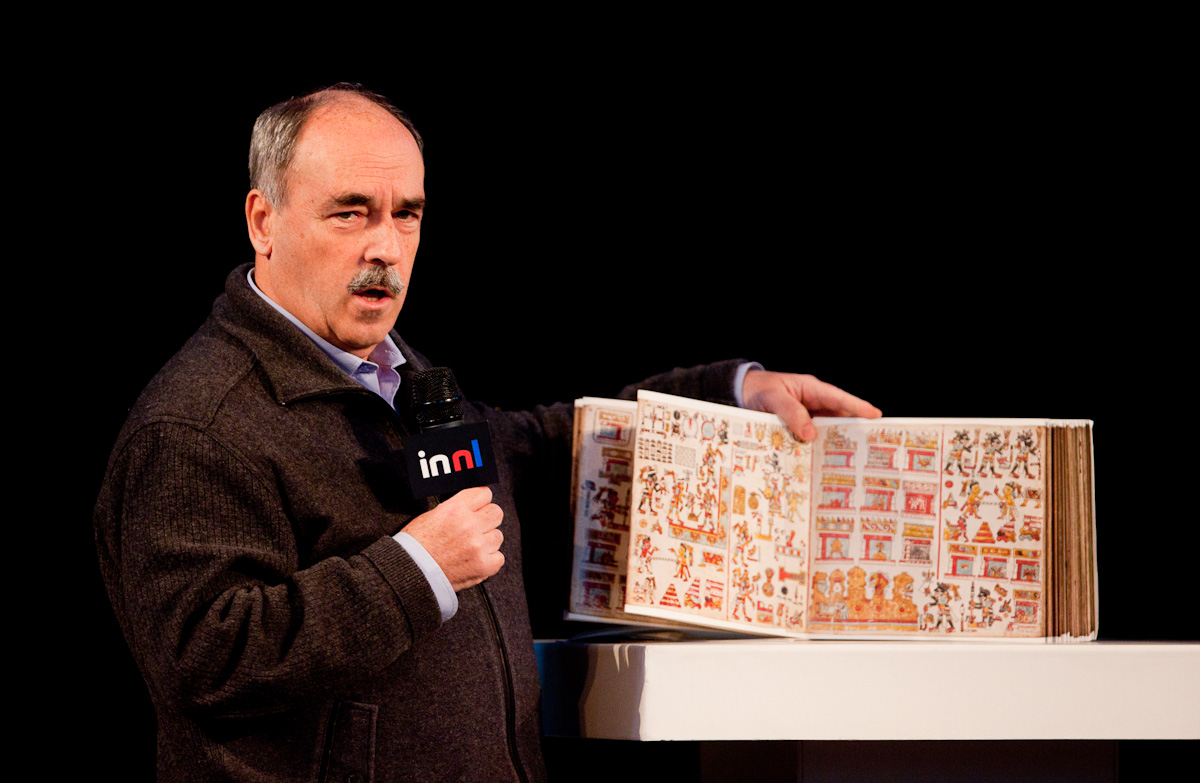
Jansen (2010)

Maarten Evert Reinoud Gerard Nicolaas Jansen (born 4 October 1952 in Zeist) is a Dutch academic and professor of Mesoamerican archaeology and history. As of 2007 Jansen holds the position of Dean of the Faculty of Archaeology at Leiden University, Netherlands. Jansen is an internationally renowned figure in pre-Columbian Mesoamerican studies, whose particular field of expertise concerns the culture, history and manuscripts of the Mixtec civilization from the Oaxacan region of central-southern Mexico.
