= Central National-Gottesman =

American paper and wood products company

Central National-Gottesman Inc.
- Type: Private company
- Industry: Pulp, paper, metal, packaging and forest products
- Founded: 1886, New York City
- Headquarters: Purchase, New York, United States
- Key people: Kenneth L. Wallach, Executive chairman, Andrew Wallach, President and CEO
- Revenue: ▲$9.3 billion USD (2023 Forbes Estimate)
- Number of employees: 4,000
- Website: cng-inc.com

Central National-Gottesman Inc. (CNG) is one of the world's largest distributors of pulp, paper, packaging, nonwovens & fibers, tissue, metals and wood products. The company employs over 4,000 staff in more than 150 locations in 48 cities across North America and in 29 countries around the world, including 43 warehouses and 46 retail stores.

CNG operates through three divisions: The Central National Division, a global distributor of pulp, paper, packaging, nonwovens & fiber, tissue, metals and wood products; the North American Distribution Division, comprising three regional paper distributors which supply a range of paper, packaging and products to commercial printers, large office and sports facilities and corporate end users; and the Lindenmeyr Publications Group, which supplies paper to the book, magazine, catalogue, retail and direct mail industry.

In 2019, Crains New York Business listed CNG as the 5th Largest Private Company in New York, with a 2018 revenue of $6.2 Billion, which is a 17% increase over 2017 revenue.

With 2021 revenues of $7 Billion, Forbes ranked CNG 66th in its annual list of "The Largest Private Companies", and Crains New York Business listed CNG as the 11th largest private company in the New York region.

In 2023, Forbes ranked CNG #58 in their list of America's Largest Private Companies with total revenue of $9.3B (Estimated).

== History ==
Founded in Manhattan, New York City, in 1886 as M. Gottesman & Company, the firm was substantially expanded under his son D.S. Gottesman in the first half of the 20th century. When D.S. Gottesman first started, he was a founding partner of The Central National Bank in New York City, which, through a series of mergers, the bank became part of JPMorgan Chase & Co. After the sale of the bank, the paper company has continued to grow both organically and through acquisition. In 1984 CNG entered the paper distribution business in the Northeast and Mid-Atlantic regions of United States through the acquisition of Lindenmeyr Paper Corporation, followed by D.F. Munroe Company in 1988, Communication Paper Corporation in 1991, and Perkins & Squier Company in 1998.

== Expansion ==
CNG's paper distribution business expanded its geographical footprint in the next decade, opening branches in new locations–Richmond, Chicago, Milwaukee and Durham, NC–as well acquiring several paper distributors in existing markets: the Hudson City Division of Frank Parsons, Inc. in 2009; the Frank Parsons Fine Paper Division in 2010; Hudson Valley Paper Company in 2011; and both Domtar Corporation's Ariva paper merchant business and Bradner Central's paper distribution business in 2013. Geographic expansion continued with the purchase of Spicers Paper, Inc. and Kelly Paper on the West Coast in 2012. In 2015 CNG entered the Canadian paper distribution market with the acquisition of Spicers Canada.

With continued expansion, CNG moved their headquarters from 100 Park Ave in Manhattan to Purchase, NY. Today, about 250 employees are based in the Purchase, NY headquarters.

Other areas of CNG continued to expand as well, including the 2013 acquisition of A.T. Clayton, a leading distributor of paper for the magazine, catalogue and direct mail segment. CNG entered the plywood trading business in 2014 through the purchase of Hudson Trading and the North American operations of the Danish forest products company DHL.

After opening an office in Puerto Rico in 2017, CNG now distributes structural steel and semi-finished aluminum products.

In May 2019, CNG's Spicers Paper Division announced it had acquired Premiere Packaging Industries, Inc (PPI), a full-line packaging and office supply distributor based in Southern California. PPI's President John Luyben will continue to serve as President and will report to Spicers President Jan Gottesman.

== Leadership ==
The company was run from 1956 to 1979 by Ira D. Wallach (son-in-law of D.S. Gottesman). His son James G. Wallach, who launched the company’s expansion into the North American paper distribution business, was CEO from 1979 until his death in 1998. Another son, Kenneth L. Wallach, became CEO in 1998, leading the company through a 17-year period of significant geographic and financial growth. He assumed the position of Executive chairman in 2015. Andrew M. Wallach (son of James G. Wallach), a member of the fifth generation of the founding family, was named President and CEO in January 2015.

== Central National Division ==
The Central National Division is focused on metals, pulp and paper, and wood products. Some of Central National's top clients include Westrock, Domtar, International Paper, Walmart, and Amazon.

== Lindenmeyr Publications Group ==
The Lindenmeyr Central is focused on selling specialized paper and printing services for retailers, catalogers, publishers, direct marketers & financial services providers.

The Lindenmeyr Book Publishing Papers is focused on selling and disturbing a wide range of paper products to the book publishing community.

== North American Distribution Division ==
Lindenmeyr Munroe is focused on selling paper, packaging, wide format, and facility solutions across the United States. Lindenmeyr is based in Teterboro, NJ and has over 50 warehouses mostly located in the Northeast, Mid-Atlantic, Midwest and South. In 2022, CNG/Lindenmeyr Munroe acquired Lewis Paper, based in Addison, IL.

Kelly Spicers is focused on selling paper, packaging, wide format, and facility solutions across the West Coast of the United States. Kelly Spicers is based in Santa Fe Springs, CA and has 27 offices and warehouses across the Western United States. Some of Kelly Spicers' top clients include Wynn Resorts, Disney, Gap Inc., Gilead, Pepsi, MGM Resorts, Delta Dental and John Paul Mitchell Systems.

In 2025, Kelly Spicers acquired Creative Packaging Group in Denver. Spicers Canada, similar to Kelly Spicers is focused on selling paper, packaging, wide format, and facility solutions across Canada. Spicers Canada is based in Vaughan, Ontario and has 16 officers and warehouses across Canada.

== Wholesale Distribution Division ==
S.P. Richards is an Atlanta, GA based wholesale distributor of office products and janitorial supplies. SPR was originally founded in 1848 but was purchased by CNG in 2023.

== Media Horizons ==
Media Horizons is a Division of Central National Gottesman that provides advertising consultation. Media Horizons is based in Norwalk, CT.

== CNG Foundation ==
Every year, CNG is a top sponsor of The Pan-Mass Challenge.

== Greenhaven Associates ==
Formally the Investment Division of Central National-Gottesman, Greenhaven Associates is a private investment management firm with approx. 100 clients and $10.5 Billion under management. Edgar Wachenheim III is the founder, CEO and Chairman of Greenhaven Associates. Ed Wachenheim is married to Sue Wallach Wachenheim, the daughter of Ira D. Wallach who is the former CEO of Central National-Gottesman. Greenhaven clients include wealthy families, university endowments and nonprofits. Greenhaven is based in the same building as Central National-Gottesman and invests with a three- to four-year time horizon and is known to pay little attention to short-term or relative performance or to predict on the near-term direction of the stock market. According to CNBC, from 1988 to 2017, the average annual return of a Greenhaven portfolio had been roughly 19 percent.

Ed Wachenheim published his first book in 2018, titled "Common Stocks and Common Sense: The Strategies, Analyses, Decisions, and Emotions of a Particularly Successful Value Investor". Shortly after announcing his book, Wachenheim was one of the featured speakers at the 2018 Delivering Alpha conference.
