= Rebecca Gottesman =

Associate professor

Rebecca Fran Gottesman is Senior Investigator and Stroke Branch Chief at the National Institute of Neurological Disorders and Stroke (NINDS) at the National Institutes of Health (NIH).

Before joining NINDS, she was Professor of Neurology and Epidemiology at Johns Hopkins University. Gottesman completed a B.A. in Psychology at Columbia University (1995), an M.D. at Columbia University (2000), and a Ph.D. in Clinical Investigation at Johns Hopkins University (2007). She is a Fellow of the American Neurological Association (2012) and a Fellow of the American Heart Association (2015).

Her research, funded primarily by the National Institutes of Health, focuses on the vascular contribution to cognitive impairment and dementia, including Alzheimer's disease, and she uses brain imaging within cohorts such as ARIC to understand a mechanism for a vascular impact on Alzheimer's Disease. In a study published in JAMA, she linked heart risks to the brain plaques of Alzheimer's, finding that compared to people with no midlife risk factors, suffering from obesity, smoking or having high cholesterol, high blood pressure or diabetes had an 88 percent increased risk of elevated levels of plaques, a hallmark of Alzheimer's. Those with two or more risk factors had triple the risk.
