= Belmont Prize =

German music award

The Belmont Prize is a music award named after the place of destiny in Shakespeare's The Merchant of Venice. The Munich-based Forberg Schneider Foundation, founded in 1997, promotes outstanding achievements in the field of contemporary music. The biennially-awarded prize is endowed with €20,000 and is one of Europe's highest endowed awards for artistic creation.

== Recipients ==
- 1999 Jörg Widmann
- 2001 Florent Boffard
- 2004 Carolin Widmann
- 2005 Quatuor Ébène
- 2007 Bruno Mantovani
- 2009 Marino Formenti
- 2012 Alex Ross
- 2013 Sabrina Hölzer
- 2015 Milica Djordjevic
- 2018 Eamonn Quinn
- 2020 Florian Weber
- 2022 Sarah Aristidou
- 2024 Mirela Ivičević
