= Samuel Gottesman =

Hungarian-American merchant, financier and philanthropist

D. Samuel Gottesman
- Born: February 22, 1884; Munkács, Austria-Hungary (now Ukraine)
- Died: April 21, 1956 (aged 72); New York City, U.S.
- Occupation: Businessman
- Spouse: Jeane Herskovits Gottesman
- Family: David Gottesman (nephew); Esther Gottesman (sister-in-law); Ira D. Wallach (son-in-law); Steven Ungerleider (grandson)

David Samuel Gottesman (February 22, 1884 – April 21, 1956) was a Hungarian-born, American pulp-paper merchant, financier and philanthropist. He was generally known as Samuel Gottesman or D. Samuel Gottesman.

== Biography ==
He was born to a Jewish family on February 22, 1884, to Mendel Gottesman and Sarah Fischgrund in Munkacs, in Bereg County, Hungary, (present-day Zakarpattia Oblast, Ukraine). In 1885, Gottesman emigrated to the United States and later joined his father's paper-making business, M. Gottesman & Company.

Samuel Gottesman died on April 21, 1956.

== Banking ==
He was also a successful banker, organizing the Central National Bank in New York City. Today, through a series of mergers, the bank became amalgamated into JPMorgan Chase & Co. Further, he became the director of the Eastern Corporation and of Rayonier Inc.

== Philanthropy ==
Gottesman became well known for his generous philanthropy. His monetary gifts extended to the New York Public Library and numerous Jewish organizations and institutions, including the D. Samuel Gottesman Library at Yeshiva University, Albert Einstein College of Medicine, in New York City.

One of his highest-profile gifts was the donation of the Dead Sea Scrolls to the State of Israel, where they are housed in the Shrine of the Book. His sister-in-law, Esther G. Gottesman, perceived the importance of the scrolls and encouraged him to purchase and donate them to Israel. The shrine, located adjacent to the Israel Museum in western Jerusalem, was funded by a foundation established by Gottesman's children as a memorial to their father.

== Family ==
Samuel Gottesman was the uncle of billionaire David Gottesman, the grandfather of sports psychologist Steven Ungerleider, and the great grandfather of physician and film producer, Shoshana R. Ungerleider.

His wife, Jeane Herskovits Gottesman, died of cancer in 1942 at age 49, a year after his granddaughter Jenifer was born. She likewise died of cancer, in 1991.

His daughter, Celeste Ruth Gottesman (1913–2013), was a wealthy modern-art collector and museum and library benefactor who resided in New York City. Her first husband was Jerome John Altman, whom she divorced in 1935 and then married American architect and philanthropist Armand Phillip Bartos. Celeste also established the Pinewood Foundation in 1958, named after her father's estate in Lawrence, Long Island, New York.
