= David Gottesman =

American businessman (1926–2022)

David "Sandy" Gottesman
- Born: April 26, 1926; New York City, U.S.
- Died: September 28, 2022 (aged 96); Rye, New York, U.S.
- Education: Trinity College (BA); Harvard University (MBA)
- Occupations: Businessman; investor
- Known for: Early investor in Berkshire Hathaway
- Spouse: Ruth Levy (m. 1950)
- Children: 3
- Parents: Benjamin Gottesman (father); Esther Garfunkel (mother)
- Relatives: Samuel Gottesman (uncle)

David Sanford "Sandy" Gottesman (April 26, 1926 – September 28, 2022) was an American businessman, billionaire, and philanthropist. He founded First Manhattan Co. (FMC), and was noted for his friendship with Warren Buffett.

== Early life and education ==
Gottesman was born to a Jewish family in New York City on April 26, 1926. His father, Benjamin, worked as a banker and investor; his mother, Esther (née Garfunkel), played a key role in procuring the Dead Sea Scrolls for Israel. Through his mother, distant relations included Barrett Visanska, a Polish immigrant and a founder of the Tree of Life Congregation in Columbia, South Carolina, and for whom the Visanska Starks House is named. He had two siblings, Milton Gottesman and Alice Gottesman Bayer. He was also a nephew of American pulp-paper merchant, financier, and philanthropist Samuel Gottesman. The family relocated to New Rochelle, New York, during Gottesman's childhood. He joined the US Army after high school and was first sent to Princeton University to study engineering, before being deployed to the South Pacific theater in 1945. Upon his return from military service after an honorable discharge, he obtained a bachelor's degree from Trinity College. He then undertook postgraduate studies at Harvard Business School, graduating with a Master of Business Administration in 1950.

== Career ==
After graduating, Gottesman worked at Hallgarten & Company in mergers and acquisitions for around a decade. In 1963, he was introduced to Warren Buffett at a Wall Street club lunch by a mutual friend, who recognized their identical approach of purchasing value stocks. They soon became good friends, playing golf with each other and having conversations every Sunday night over the phone about which stocks to invest in. Over the next two years, Gottesman often made brief trips to visit Buffett in Omaha, Nebraska; they would discuss ideas from the later part of the day into the early hours of the morning, after which Gottesman would typically return to New York on a red-eye flight to get home by the next morning.

In 1964, Gottesman founded the investment advisory firm First Manhattan Co. He was also an early investor in Berkshire Hathaway. The two firms co-invested in Diversified Retailing Co., which had been established by Gottesman, Buffett, and Charlie Munger to purchase private retail companies, beginning with Hochschild Kohn's (whose president was the uncle of Gottesman's wife). The trio soon concluded that this acquisition had been a "terrible mistake," and Gottesman oversaw its reselling, at only a minor loss. In 1978, Diversified Retailing merged with Berkshire Hathaway.

March 2021, Gottesman owned 17,202 class A shares and more than two million class B shares in Berkshire Hathaway. This made up a sizable portion of his wealth. Gottesman later commented, "There probably has never been a better return on any stock held for 44 years in the history of Wall Street". He estimated that by 2012, they had been worth 6,000 times their original value. In 2003, he joined the Berkshire Hathaway board of directors.

== Philanthropy ==
In 2008, Gottesman donated $25 million to the Albert Einstein College of Medicine. This gift was used to found the Ruth L. and David S. Gottesman Institute for Stem Cell Biology and Regenerative Medicine, a stem cell research center. He and his wife also funded the Train Track Park's bicycle path around Jerusalem. The Gottesman Hall of Planet Earth at the American Museum of Natural History is named in their honor. He served as a Vice Chair of the American Museum of Natural History for several years. The new building of the National Library of Israel in Jerusalem is also named after them.

After Gottesman's death, his wife Ruth donated an additional $1 billion to the Albert Einstein College of Medicine in February 2024, dedicated to making tuition free for all future medical students. Her donation is one of the largest that has ever been made to an educational institution in the United States.

== Personal life ==
Gottesman married Ruth Levy in 1950. They had met in 1948 before she began her studies at Mount Holyoke College, and they remained married for 72 years until his death. She has a bachelor's degree from Barnard College, as well as a master's degree in Developmental Education and an Ed.D. in Human Cognition and Learning in the area of Educational Psychology, both from Teachers College, Columbia University.

Together, they had three children – sons Robert W. "Bob" Gottesman (wife Trudy Elbaum), the executive chairman and former CEO of First Manhattan, and William L. Gottesman (wife Debra Lopez), along with daughter Alice R. Gottesman. They also had seven grandchildren.

They lived in Rye, New York, and he was an avid swimmer. He served as a trustee of the Mount Sinai Medical Center and was Vice Chairman and trustee of the American Museum of Natural History.

Gottesman died at his home in Rye on September 28, 2022, at the age of 96.
