= David Gottesman (politician) =

American politician

David M. Gottesman

Member of the New Hampshire Senate from the 12th district
- In office 2004-2008
- Succeeded by: Peggy Gilmour

Personal details
- Born: February 3, 1948 (age 78) Philadelphia, Pennsylvania
- Party: Democratic
- Spouse: Jean Corey
- Profession: Attorney

David Gottesman (born February 3, 1948) is a former Democratic member of the New Hampshire Senate, representing the 12th District from 2004 to 2008. He was also the Democratic Whip in the New Hampshire Senate in 2008. One of Sen. Gottesman's most notable accomplishments came in 2007 with the passing of New Hampshire's SB-42-FN. Sen. Gottesman along with nine other state senators and four state representatives sponsored the bill, which prohibits smoking in public bars and restaurants and some other enclosed areas.
