= Ira D. Wallach =

American businessman and philanthropist (1909 - 2007)

- Born: Ira David Wallach; June 3, 1909; New York City, U.S.
- Died: January 6, 2007 (aged 97); White Plains, New York, U.S.
- Education: Columbia University (BA JD)
- Occupations: Businessman; philanthropist
- Known for: Head of Central National-Gottesman; Founder of EastWest Institute
- Spouse: Miriam Gottesman (m. 1938)
- Children: 4
- Family: Samuel Gottesman (father-in-law)

Ira David Wallach (June 3, 1909 – January 6, 2007) was an American businessman and philanthropist. He was head of Central National-Gottesman, the largest privately held marketer of paper and pulp products.

== Life and career ==
Born to a Jewish family in New York City, he earned his B.A. and law degrees from Columbia University. He served as a Navy lieutenant in World War II.

In 1938, he married Miriam Gottesman Wallach, the daughter of D.S. Gottesman. they had four children: James Wallach, Kenneth L. Wallach, Sue Wallach Wachenheim, and Kate Wallach Cassidy. He joined Gottesman & Company as Executive Vice President in 1946. He served as CEO from 1956 to 1979. During his tenure, the company grew to become the world's largest private marketer of wood pulp, paper and newsprint. He later served as chairman, then senior vice chairman until his death.

== Activism and philanthropy ==
Ira David Wallach was born in New York City on June 3, 1909. He earned bachelor's and law degrees from Columbia University and was a Navy lieutenant in World War II.

In 1946 he joined Gottesman & Company, as it was then known, as executive vice president. He was the chief executive and a director of the company from 1956 to 1979, later serving as chairman and then senior vice chairman, the title he held at his death. During his tenure, the company, which is based in Purchase, N.Y., grew from a relatively small wood pulp distributor, into the world's preeminent privately owned marketer of pulp and paper, with offices in 26 U.S. cities, 17 countries and representatives in 40 international locations. Wallach was a man who refused accolades, and was much admired and adored by his company's employees.

In 1980, Wallach co-founded the Institute for East West Security Studies, now known as the EastWest Institute, a research group that focuses on international political, economic and security issues.

In a career of more than 70 years, he was a lawyer and businessman with interests in philanthropy and in global economic and political affairs. With his wife Miriam, he created a charitable foundation whose beneficiaries included the New York Public Library, Columbia University, the American Museum of Natural History and the Metropolitan Museum of Art. He is the namesake of Columbia's Wallach Hall and Wallach Art Gallery.

Wallach was an outspoken opponent of the Vietnam War and many policies of the Nixon administration. He was named in a White House memorandum listing Nixon's "political opponents", one step down from the notorious "enemies list" — people who were singled out for tax audits and other problems.
