= Robert Helps =

American composer and pianist

Robert Eugene Helps (b. Passaic, New Jersey, United States, September 23, 1928; d. Tampa, Florida, United States, November 24, 2001) was an American pianist and composer.

== Career ==
Helps studied at the universities of Columbia (1947–49) and Berkeley (1949–51) He was one of the most distinguished pupils of Abby Whiteside and perhaps the most well-known practitioner of her theories of rhythm and of a technique directed from the humerus rather than the fingers. He studied composition with Roger Sessions, who exerted a strong influence on his career, and whose music he often performed and recorded. He cultivated a lifelong interest for Frédéric Chopin's Études as well as Leopold Godowsky's Studies on Chopin's Études which informed both his piano playing and his composition.

Helps taught piano at the New England Conservatory of Music, the San Francisco Conservatory of Music, Princeton University, Stanford University, the University of California, Berkeley, and the Manhattan School of Music, and the University of South Florida. At the end of his life he divided his time between the San Francisco Conservatory of Music and the University of South Florida. When in California he resided in Berkeley, a city with which he felt a strong affinity.

== Awards and recognition ==
Helps was a recipient of awards from the National Endowment for the Arts, the Guggenheim Foundation, and the Ford Foundation. In 1976 he received an Academy Award from the American Academy of Arts and Letters. His music has been released on the Naxos, CRI, Desto, and Albany labels.

The University of South Florida's Special Collections holds the Robert Helps Archive. The university also sponsors a Robert Helps Festival and awards an annual Robert Helps Prize for young composers.
