= Shrine of the Book =

Building of the Israel Museum in Jerusalem

- היכל הספר
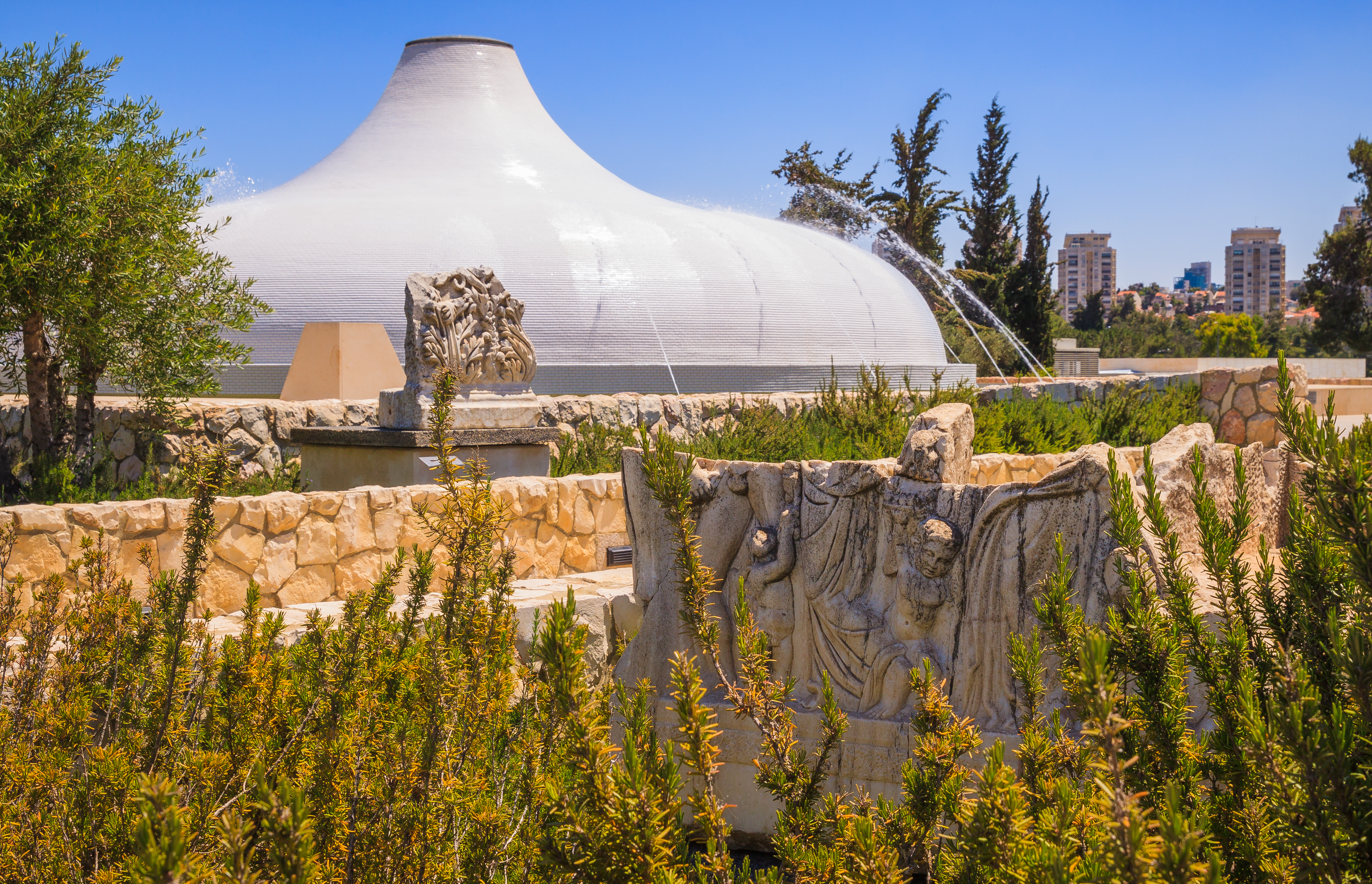
- Interactive map of Shrine of the Book
- Location: Jerusalem
- Coordinates: 31°46′24″N 35°12′10″E
- Designer: Armand Bartos and Frederick Kiesler
- Type: Museum
- Material: Black basalt
- Completion date: 1965

The Shrine of the Book (Hebrew: היכל הספר, Heikhal HaSefer) is a wing of the Israel Museum in the Givat Ram neighborhood of Jerusalem that houses the Dead Sea Scrolls and the Aleppo Codex, among other texts.

== History ==
The building was constructed in 1965, funded by the family of David Samuel Gottesman, a Hungarian-Jewish philanthropist. The building was designed by Armand Phillip Bartos, Frederick John Kiesler and Gezer Heller over a period of seven years.

The shrine is built as a white dome, covering a structure placed two-thirds below the ground, that is reflected in a pool of water that surrounds it. Across from the white dome is a black basalt wall. According to one interpretation, the colors and shapes of the building are based on the imagery of the Scroll of the War of the Sons of Light Against the Sons of Darkness; the white dome symbolizes the Sons of Light and the black wall symbolizes the Sons of Darkness.

As the fragility of the scrolls makes it impossible to display all on a continuous basis, a system of rotation is used. After a scroll has been exhibited for 3–6 months, it is removed from its showcase and placed temporarily in a special storeroom, where it "rests" from exposure.

The shrine houses the Isaiah Scroll, dating from the second century BCE, the most intact of the Dead Sea Scrolls, and the Aleppo Codex, dating from the 10th century CE, the oldest existing Hebrew Bible. A facsimile of the original Isaiah Scroll is now on display in the Shrine of the Book.

In 2013, the Bank of Israel released an Israeli bullion coin dedicated to the Shrine of the Book.

== Gallery ==
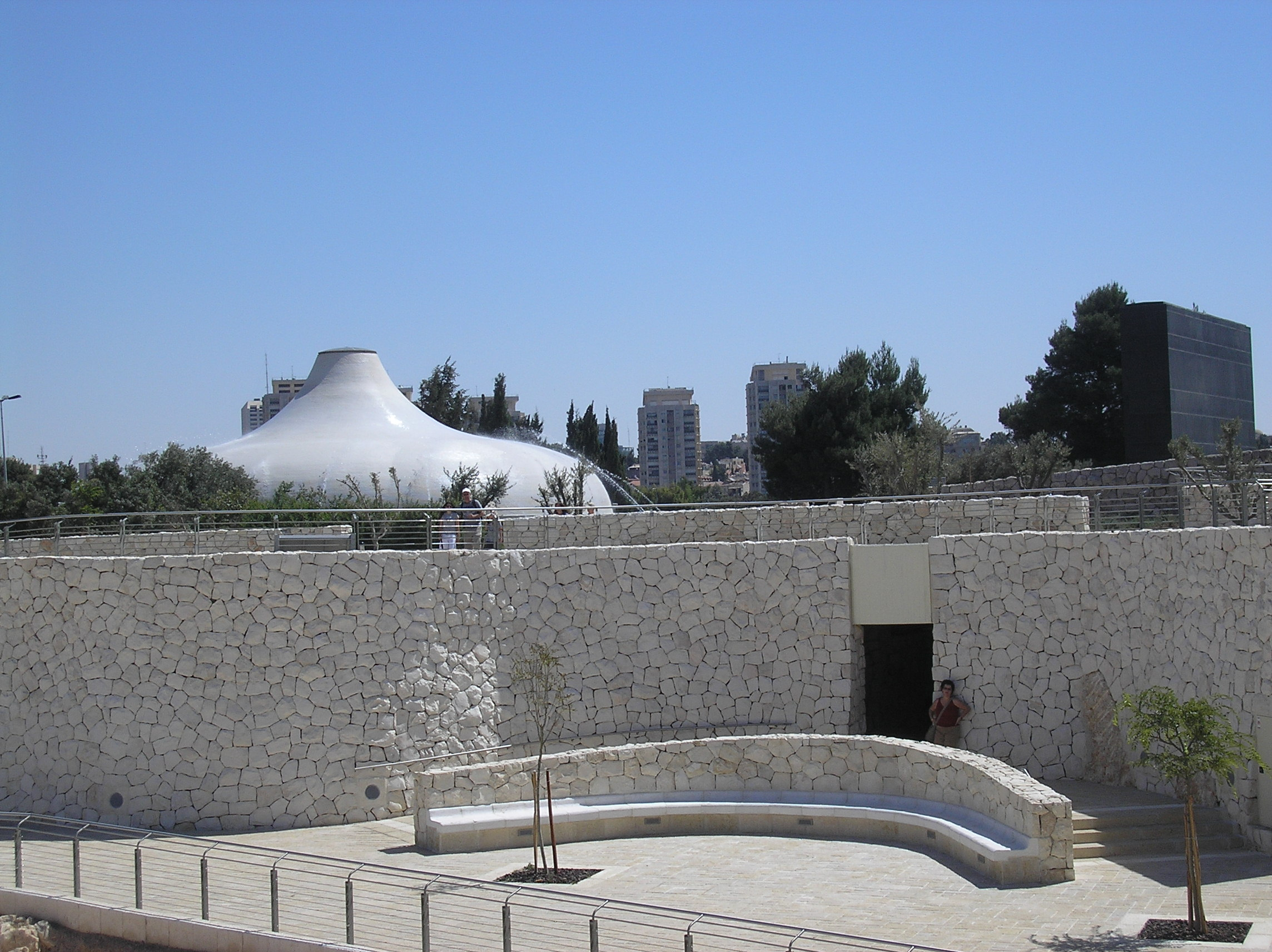
Shrine of the Book

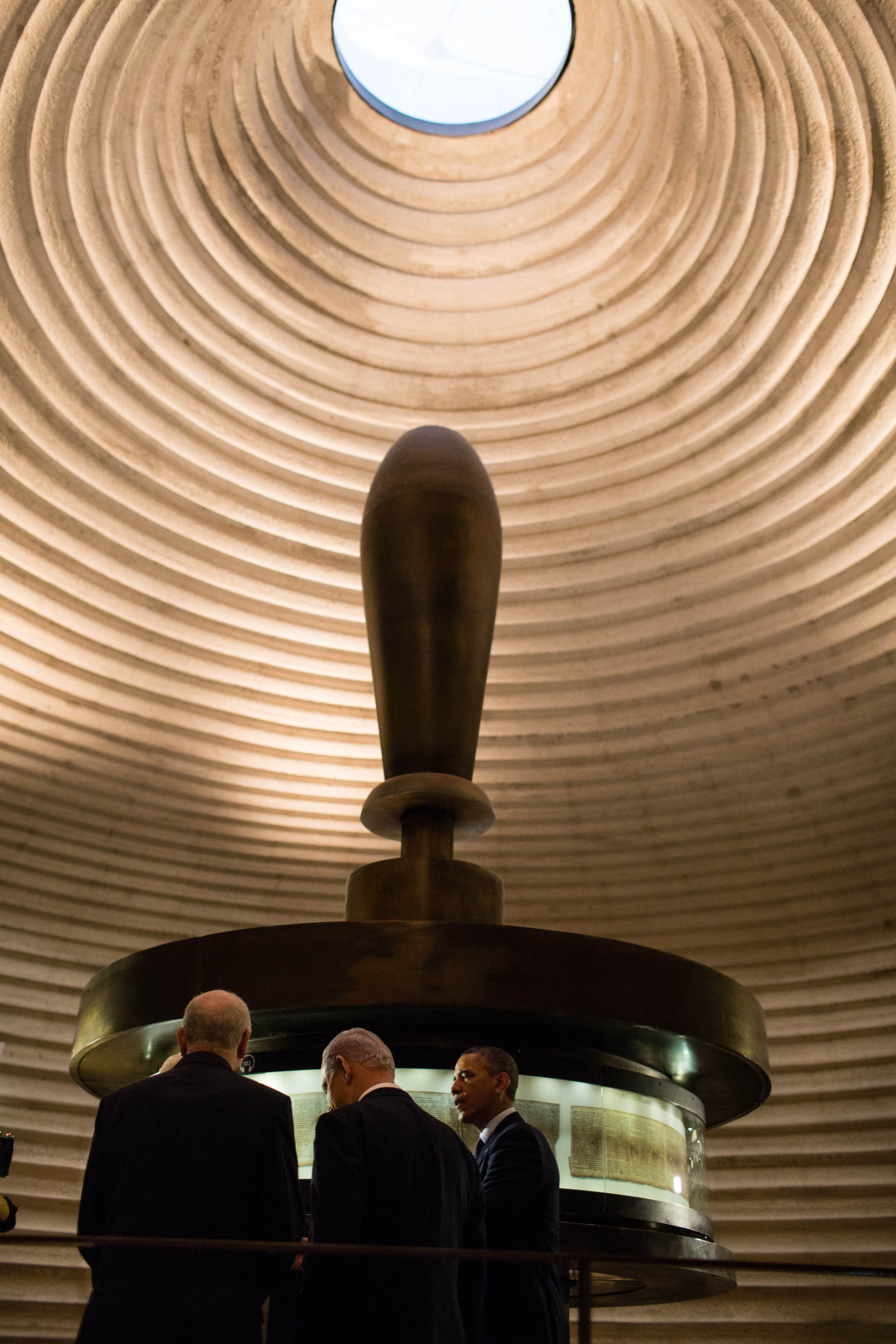
Barack Obama viewing the Dead Sea Scrolls, 2013

== See also ==
- Tourism in Israel
- List of museums in Israel
- Culture of Israel
