= Soile Isokoski =

Finnish opera singer (born 1957)

Soile Marja Isokoski (born 14 February 1957) is a Finnish lyric soprano, active in opera, concert works and lieder.

== Life and career ==
Isokoski was born in Posio, Finland. She graduated from the Sibelius Academy in Helsinki (a cantor-organist diploma, a singing teacher's degree and a singing diploma) and made her concert debut there in 1986.

Isokoski won the Lappeenranta song competition in Finland (1987), the Elly Ameling Competition in the Netherlands (1988), and the Tokyo International Singing Competition (1990). In 1987 she was a finalist in the BBC Cardiff Singer of the World competition.

She worked first as a church musician in Northern Finland. In 1987 she was engaged as a soloist with the Finnish National Opera and stayed there until 1994. Her first appearance there was as Mimi in Puccini's La bohème in 1987.

Isokoski has sung at all the leading opera houses in Europe, including the Vienna State Opera, Théâtre du Châtelet, Opéra Bastille, La Scala, Deutsche Oper Berlin, Berlin State Opera, Semperoper, the Hamburg State Opera, and the Cologne Opera.

She made her début at the Metropolitan Opera as the Countess in The Marriage of Figaro in 2002. The New York Times wrote on 28 January 2002: "Ms. Isokoski... touched on the Countess' sense of abandonment by the Count without diminishing her regal bearing or the graceful humor she must contribute to the second act. And her dark, burnished soprano should make her a good addition to the Met roster."

In 2007 Isokoski made her San Francisco Opera debut portraying the role of the Marschallin in Der Rosenkavalier. In 2010 she made her Los Angeles Opera debut as Elsa in Lohengrin.

She has also appeared at many festivals such as Salzburg Festival, Edinburgh International Festival, Chorégies d'Orange, The Proms in London, Tanglewood Music Festival and Savonlinna Opera Festival.

Isokoski's song repertoire is extensive. She has given recitals with her regular accompanist Marita Viitasalo-Pohjola all over the world, including in New York, Washington, D.C., Fort Lauderdale, Vienna, London, Paris, Amsterdam, Berlin, Munich, Rome, Athens, Moscow, Saint Petersburg, and Tokyo.

Isokoski has appeared with many renowned conductors including Claudio Abbado, Vladimir Ashkenazy, Daniel Barenboim, James Conlon, Andrew Davis, Colin Davis, John Eliot Gardiner, Daniele Gatti, Valery Gergiev, Bernard Haitink, Marek Janowski, Neeme Järvi, Okko Kamu, James Levine, Zubin Mehta, Yehudi Menuhin, Riccardo Muti, Sakari Oramo, Seiji Ozawa, Simon Rattle, Esa-Pekka Salonen, Jukka-Pekka Saraste, Leif Segerstam, and Osmo Vänskä.

== Roles ==
- Così fan tutte "Fiordiligi" (Mozart)
- Don Giovanni "Donna Elvira" (Mozart)
- The Marriage of Figaro "Countess " (Mozart)
- The Magic Flute "Pamina " (Mozart)
- Otello "Desdemona" (Verdi)
- Falstaff "Alice Ford" (Verdi)
- Simon Boccanegra "Amelia" (Verdi)
- Die Meistersinger von Nürnberg "Eva" (Wagner)
- Lohengrin "Elsa" (Wagner)
- Der Freischütz "Agathe" (Weber)
- The Bartered Bride "Marenka " (Smetana)
- Der Rosenkavalier "Marschallin" (Richard Strauss)
- Capriccio "Countess" (Richard Strauss)
- Ariadne auf Naxos "Ariadne" (Richard Strauss)
- Daphne "Daphne" (Richard Strauss)
- The Tales of Hoffmann "Antonia" (Offenbach)
- Faust "Marguerite" (Gounod)
- La Juive "Rachel" (Halévy)
- La bohème "Mimi" (Puccini)
- Turandot "Liù" (Puccini)
- Carmen "Micaëla" (Bizet)
- Eugene Onegin "Tatjana" (Tchaikovsky)
- Peter Grimes "Ellen Orford" (Britten)
- Dialogues of the Carmelites "Madame Lidoine" (Poulenc)

== Recordings ==
CD

- Christmas Carols Finlandia Records 1989
- Schubert: Lieder Finlandia 1994
- Schumann : Liederkreis Op. 39, Frauenliebe und –leben Finlandia 1995
- My World of Songs, Schubert, Schumann, Sibelius, Grieg & al. Finlandia 1999
- Finnish Songs Ondine 2000
- R. Strauss: Orchestral Songs Ondine 2002
- Wolf: Italienisches Liederbuch with Bo Skovhus Ondine 2002
- Artist Portrait Schubert, Schumann, Grieg, Sibelius Warner Classics 2002
- Finnish sacred Songs Ondine 2003
- Mozart: Arias Ondine 2004
- Hymns in Finnish Ondine 2005
- Sibelius: Luonnotar, Orchestral Songs Ondine 2006
- Songs by Sibelius, Strauss and Berg, Wigmore Hall, Live, BBC Recording 2006
- Christmas Carols with YL Male Voice Choir Ondine 2006
- Scene d'amore: Scenes and arias by Tchaikovsky, Bizet, Gounod, Puccini, Verdi Ondine 2008
- Hindemith: Das Marienleben Ondine 2009
- Richard Strauss: Lieder Ondine 2011
- Richard Strauss: Three Hymns, Opera arias Ondine 2012
- Oi jouluyö, Christmas Carols Ondine 2014
- Chausson: Poème de l'amour et de la mer, Berlioz: Les nuits d'été, Duparc: Songs Ondine 2015

- Rautavaara: Cantos, Die Liebenden etc. Finlandia 1989
- Mendelssohn: Elias, op. 70 Harmonia Mundi 1993
- Mahler: Symphonie 4 Symphonie für Sopran und Orchester 1993
- Mozart: Così fan tutte Accent 1993
- Mendelssohn: Paulus, op. 36 Opus III 1995
- Sibelius: Kullervo Op 7 Chandos 1995
- Gothoni: Der Ochs und sein Hirte Ondine 1995
- Fux: La deposizione dalla croce Novalis 1995
- Schubert: Mass E-flat major, D 950, Berlin Classics 1996
- Kokkonen: Requiem BIS 1996
- Sibelius: Finlandia / Luonnotar etc. Deutsche Grammophon 1996
- Mahler: Symphonie 2 in C minor Fonit Cetra Records 1997
- Schubert: Die Verschworenen Opus III 1997
- Brahms: Ein Deutsches Requiem, Op.45 Opus III 1997
- Zemlinsky: Der Zwerg EMI 1997
- Mozart: Don Giovanni Deutsche Grammophon 1998
- Schubert: Missa Solemnis, Stabat Mater, Salve Regina Ondine 1999
- Mendelssohn: "Lobgesang" Eine Symphonie Cantate No. 2 Opus III 2000
- Beethoven: Fidelio 2000
- Beethoven: Symphonie No 9 Teldec 2000
- Sibelius: Conferment and Coronation Cantatas etc. Ondine 2000
- Zemlinsky: Sämtliche Orchesterlieder EMI 2000
- Live from the Kuhmo Festival, A Century of Finnish Chamber Music Ondine 2002
- Zemlinsky: Lyrische Symphonie EMI 2002
- Halévy: La Juive RCA 2002
- Pacius: Die Loreley BIS 2003
- Graun: Der Tod Jesu Querstand 2004
- Nielsen: Complete Symphonies Deutsche Grammophon 2005
- Mahler: Symphony No. 8 EMI 2005
- Wiener Opernfest 2005 Orfeo 2005
- 13. Festliche Operngala für die Deutsche AIDS-Stiftung Sony BMG 2007
- Sibelius: Kullervo Ondine 2008
- Schönberg: Gurrelieder Signum 2009
- Gounod: Faust Orfeo 2010

DVD

- Vienna State Opera gala concert – 50th anniversary of the reopening Live: Vienna, 5 November 2005
- 13. Festliche Operngala für die AIDS-Stiftung. Live-Aufnahme aus der Deutschen Oper Berlin vom 11. November 2006
- Ioan Holender Farewell Concert: Live From the Vienna State Opera 2010
- Poulenc: Dialogues des Carmélites BelAir Classiques 2011

== Awards and recognitions ==
- 1st prize in the Lappeenranta song competition 1987
- BBC Cardiff Singer of the World competition 1987 finalist
- 1st prize in the Elly Ameling Competition 1988
- 1st prize in the Tokyo International Singing Competition 1990
- The Pro Finlandia medal in honour of her notable contribution to Finnish music 2002
- Gramophone Editors's Choice Award, Four Last Songs of Richard Strauss (Ondine) 2002
- The State Prize for Music 2005
- Gramophone Award nomination for Songs by Sibelius, Strauss and Berg 2006
- MIDEM Classical Award, Sibelius: Luonnotar Orchestral Songs (Ondine) 2007
- BBC Music Magazine Award, Disc of the Year and Vocal Award, Sibelius: Luonnotar Orchestral Songs (Ondine) 2007
- The Sibelius Medal of the Sibelius Society of Finland 2007
- The title of Kammersängerin in Vienna 2008
- Diapason d'Or 2008, Sibelius: Kullervo with YL Male Voice Choir, Helsinki PO/Leif Segerstam, Tommi Hakala
- Prix Caecilia 2009, Hindemith: Das Marienleben
- Honorary Doctorate from the University of Helsinki 2011
