= Andrei Bondarenko =

Ukrainian baritone opera singer

Andrei Bondarenko or Andriy Bondarenko (Ukrainian: Андрíй Володи́мирович Бондаре́нко, born 1987) is a Ukrainian baritone opera singer.

== Life ==
Bondarenko was born and brought up in Kamianets-Podilskyi, Ukraine. He trained at the Tchaikovsky National Academy of Music in Kyiv. He won the "Art in the 21st Century" competition in Vorzel, and was a prize-winner at the 2006 International Rimsky-Korsakov competition in St Petersburg and the 2008 Nadezhda Obuhova Young Vocalists´ Festival. In 2007 he joined the Mariinsky Academy of Young Singers and has studied in Kyiv with Valery Buimister.

Bondarenko appeared in the Salzburg Festival in 2009, and in 2011 represented Ukraine in the BBC Cardiff Singer of the World competition, winning the Song Prize and getting through to the final for which he became hot favourite. Interviewed by Josie d'Arby for BBC2 immediately following his performance in the final, he stated that he would award himself only "70 per cent", and he was defeated by Valentina Naforniță for the main prize. In 2014, Bondarenko starred in Eugene Onegin at Glyndebourne, and in 2014 he was Count Almaviva in The Marriage of Figaro at Sydney Opera House.

In 2017, Bondarenko gave a recital at Carnegie Hall, which received mixed reviews; his French accent was criticized. In the 2017-18 season, Bondarenko made his début at the Royal Opera House, Covent Garden, as Marcello in La bohème, a role he had previously played at Glyndebourne.

Bondarenko was married to the Ukrainian soprano, Eleonora Vindau. Since 2020 he has been married to the artist manager Maria Zaikina.

In 2023, Bondarenko played the leading role in King Stakh’s Wild Hunt, an opera by Olga Podgaiskaya, at the Barbican in London; the production, by Belarus Free Theatre, featured Belarusian and Ukrainian performers.
