= Herbert von Karajan Prize =

Austrian music award

- Awarded for: a musician whose exceptional artistic achievements have found global recognition; young artists
- Location: Salzburg
- Country: Austria
- Presented by: Eliette von Karajan, Salzburg Easter Festival
- Reward: €50,000
- First award: 2017

The Herbert von Karajan Prize is a music award for young artists. It was endowed by Eliette von Karajan in 2015 and first awarded in 2017 at the Salzburg Easter Festival. The prize is endowed with €50,000 and is presented by von Karajan annually. From 2023, the prize will be presented to young and up-and-coming artists.

== Recipients ==
- 2017: Daniil Trifonov
- 2018: Sol Gabetta
- 2019: Mariss Jansons
- 2020: Janine Jansen
- 2021: Hilary Hahn
- 2022: Staatskapelle Dresden
- 2023: Alexander Köpeczi (bass), Michael Loehr (dancer), Oscar Jockel (conductor)
- 2024: Lise Davidsen (soprano), Eve-Maud Hubeaux (mezzo-soprano), and Masabane Cecilia Rangwanasha (soprano)
- 2025: Nadezhda Karyazina (mezzo-soprano), Maxim Emelyanychev (conductor)
- 2026: Jasmin White (contralto), Le Bu (bass-baritone) and Konstantin Krimmel (baritone)
