= Welsh Singers Competition =

Singing competition held in Cardiff, UK

- The official logo
- Awarded for: Singing
- Sponsored by: RBC Brewin Dolphin Wales, The Carne Trust, Sickle Foundation
- Location: Cardiff
- Country: Wales, United Kingdom
- Formerly called: Welsh Singers Showcase, Young Welsh Singers’ Competition
- Rewards: £5,000 for the winner and represents Wales in the following year's BBC Cardiff Singer of the World competition. The other finalists also win a cash prize
- First award: 1986; 40 years ago
- Winner: Ryan Vaughan Davies (2024)
- Website: Official website

Television/radio coverage
- Network: BBC Radio Cymru; S4C (2021–present)
- Related: BBC Cardiff Singer of the World competition

Welsh Singers Competition (Welsh: Cystadleuaeth Cantorion Cymreig, previously known as the Welsh Singers Showcase (Welsh: Llwyfan Cantorion Cymreig)), is a biennial singing competition that is held in Cardiff, Wales. The winner of the competition represents Wales in the BBC Cardiff Singer of the World in the following year. The competition is open to Welsh classical singers aged between 17 and 31. The final of the competition in 2022 was held at The Dora Stoutzker Hall, Royal Welsh College of Music & Drama, Cardiff. Previously it has been held at St David's Hall in Cardiff.

== History ==
The competition was established in 1964 by the Welsh Arts Council as the Young Welsh Singers’ Competition by Roy Bohana, Music Director of the Welsh Arts Council, it was initially held every three years. In 1994 a major change took place when it was decided that the winner would automatically represent Wales in BBC Cardiff Singer of the World; this necessitated that the competition became biennial. Organisation was passed to Live Music Now, the charity founded by Yehudi Menuhin, which supports young musicians at the start of their careers, by offering them performing opportunities in care homes, hospitals, community settings, schools, libraries and hospices.

In 2015 the competition became independent; by 2018 the name of the competition was changed from the Welsh Singers Competition to the Welsh Singers Showcase and in 2022 it reverted back to its original name of Welsh Singers Competition. In the same year the Welsh Singers Showcase became a registered charity.

== Competitions ==
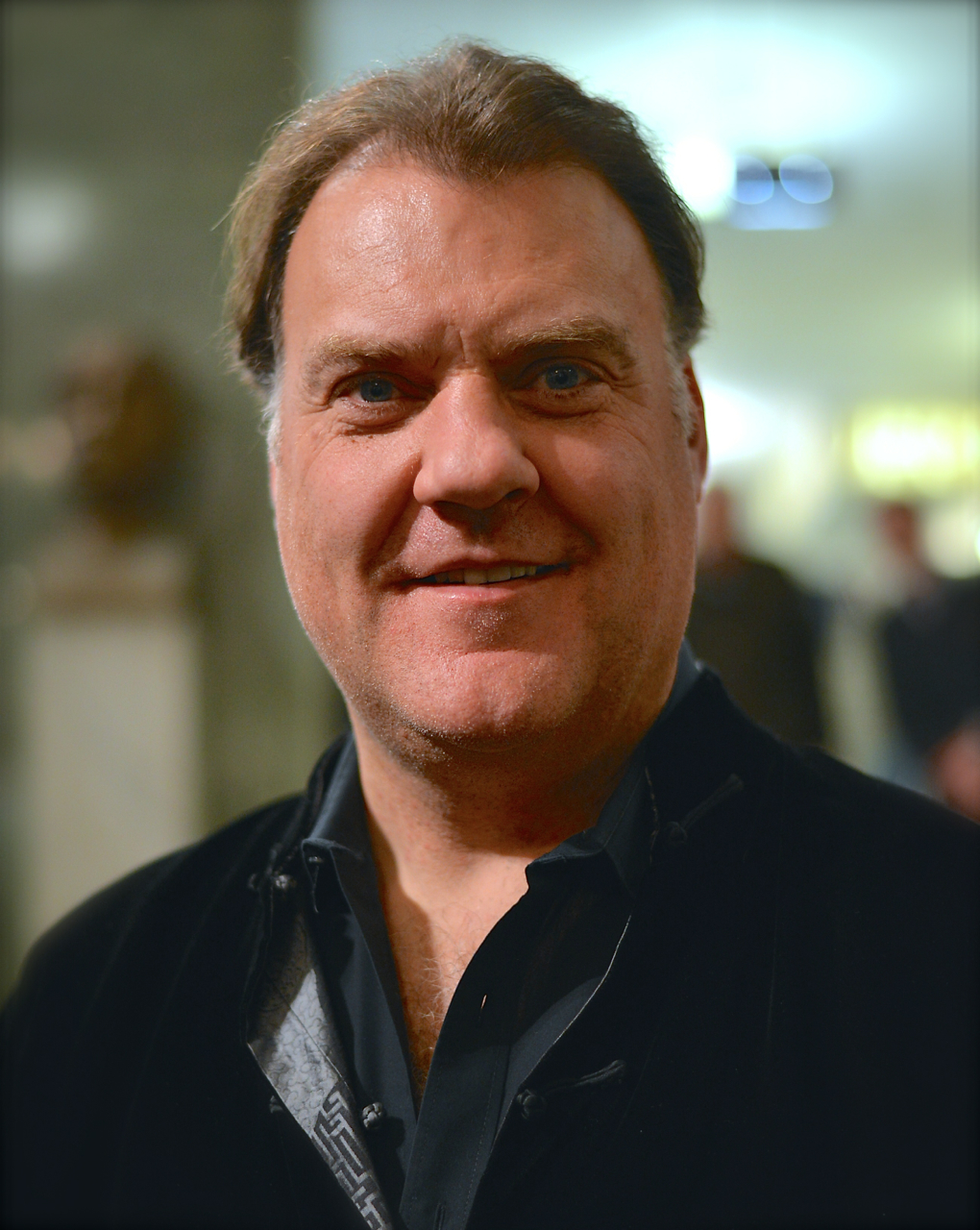
Bryn Terfel, winner of Welsh Singers Competition in 1988

Year	Winner	Voice type	Other finalists
1986	Buddug Verona James	Mezzo-soprano	
1988	Bryn Terfel	Bass-baritone	
1990	Neal Davies	Bass-baritone	
1992	Jeremy Huw Williams	Baritone	
1994	Eldrydd Cynan Jones	Soprano	
1996	Gwyn Hughes Jones	Tenor	
1998	David Kempster	Baritone	
2000	Joanne Thomas	Mezzo-soprano	
2002	Elizabeth Donovan	Soprano	
2004	Camilla Roberts	Soprano	Fflur Wyn (soprano); Cecilia Eleri Smiga (tenor); Mark Chaundy (tenor)
2006	Sarah-Jane Davies	Soprano	Caryl Hughes (mezzo-soprano); Paul Carey Jones (baritone); Alun Rhys Jenkins (tenor)
2008	Natalya Romaniw	Soprano	Laura Parfitt (soprano); John Pierce (tenor); Claire Watkins (soprano)
2010	John Pierce	Tenor	Catrin Aur Davies (soprano); Rebecca Afonwy-Jones (mezzo); Samuel Evans (baritone)
2012	Gary Griffiths	Baritone	Rhian Lois (soprano); Fflur Wyn (soprano); Sioned Gwen Davies (mezzo)
2014	Céline Forrest	Soprano	Samantha Price (mezzo); Eirlys Myfanwy Davies (mezzo); Menna Cazel Davies (soprano)
2016	Sioned Gwen Davies	Mezzo-soprano	Eirlys Myfanwy Davies (mezzo); Kieron-Connor Valentine (countertenor); Samuel Furness (tenor); Trystan Llŷr Griffiths (tenor)
2018	Angharad Lyddon	Mezzo-soprano	Sarah Gilford (soprano); Carly Owen (soprano); Jessica Robinson (soprano); Ellen Williams (soprano)
2021	Sarah Gilford	Soprano	Jessica Cale (soprano); Rachael Marsh (soprano); Osian Wyn Bowen (tenor); Rhys Batt (tenor); Kieron-Connor Valentine (countertenor)
2022	Jessica Robinson	Soprano	Dafydd Allen (baritone); Osian Wyn Bowen (tenor); Erin Gwyn Rossington (soprano); Kieron-Connor Valentine (countertenor)
2024	Ryan Vaughan Davies	Tenor	Eleri Gwilym (Soprano) (winner of the audience prize); Emyr Lloyd Jones (Tenor); Eiry Price (Soprano); Erin Gwyn Rossington (Soprano)

== See also ==
- BBC Cardiff Singer of the World competition
