= Claire Barnett-Jones =

British mezzo-soprano

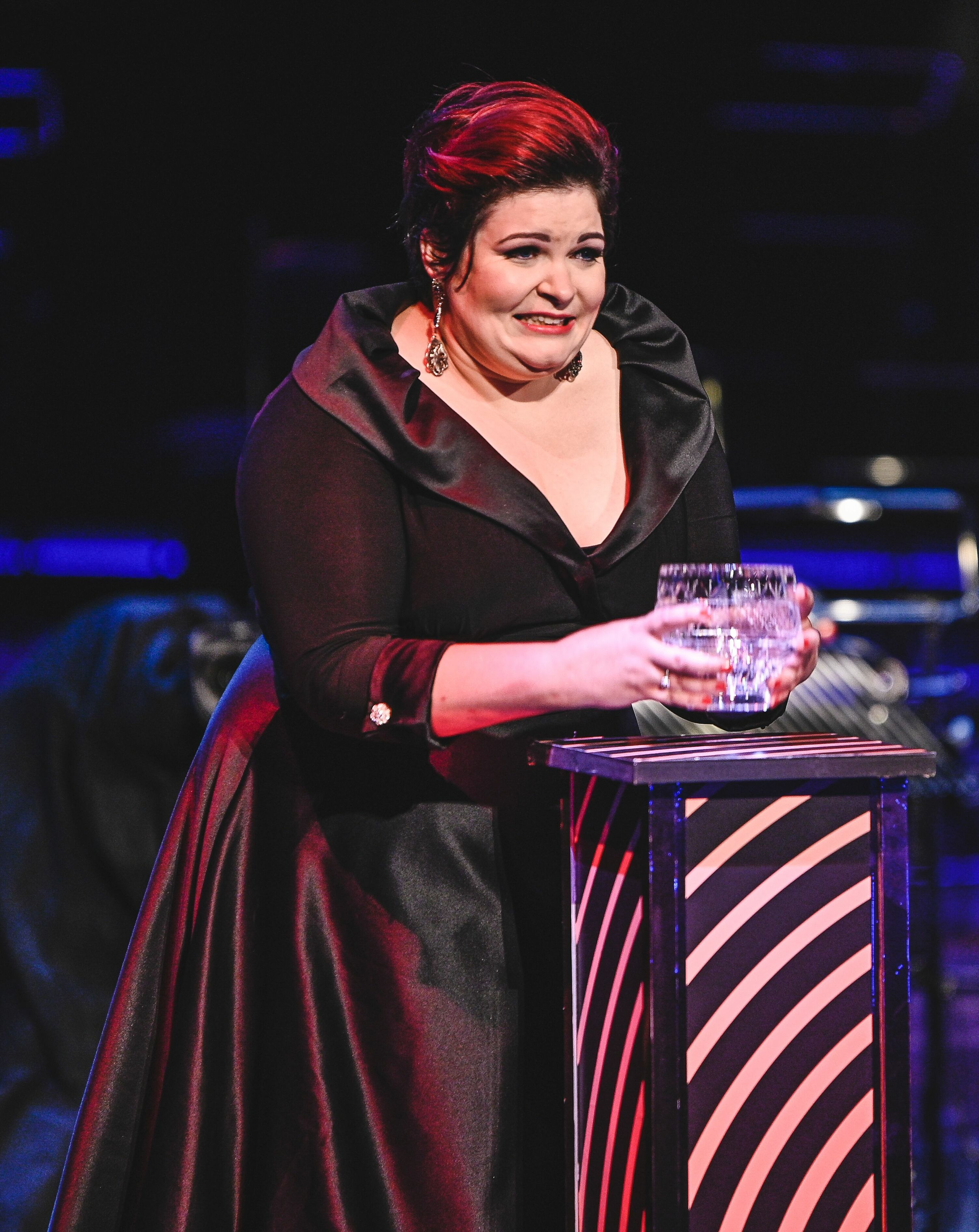
Claire Barnett-Jones winning round 4 of the 2021 BBC Cardiff Singer of the World competition. She went onto also win the Dame Joan Sutherland Audience Prize

Claire Barnett-Jones (born 1990) is a British mezzo-soprano. She was a finalist and won the Dame Joan Sutherland Audience Prize at the 2021 BBC Cardiff Singer of the World Competition. She was the Sir John Tomlinson Fellow at English National Opera, a Samling Artist Britten Pears Artist and Independent Opera Fellow.

== Early life ==
Claire Barnett-Jones was born in Taunton, Somerset, and is the eldest of 4 children. Her Father was a police officer and her Mother was a Nurse. She attended local comprehensive schools (The Castle School and Richard Huish College), where she was part of local authority music initiatives, learning the violin/viola and later on the Saxophone and Clarinet. She was the Principal Violist of the National Children's Orchestra and Somerset County Youth Orchestra, and sang in Female Barbershop Choruses. She did not start singing lessons until the age of 17.

== Career ==
Barnett-Jones obtained a bachelor's degree at the Royal Birmingham Conservatoire, and her master's degree from the Royal Academy of Music and Opera School. Her Artist Diploma was obtained at the Guildhall School of Music and Drama.

During her undergraduate studies she made her first appearance at the BBC Proms in Stockhausen's Mittwoch aus Licht with ExCathedra.

She was a Harewood Artist at English National Opera, and she made her debut in October 2019 as a last minute replacement in Harrison Birtwistle's The Mask of Orpheus, directed by Daniel Kramer, conducted by Martyn Brabbins and with Costume design by Daniel Lismore. Prior to working at ENO she was a chorister at Glyndebourne Festival Opera, understudying the roles of Suzuki in Madama Butterfly, Annina in Der Rosenkavalier and Dryad in Ariadne auf Naxos. She went on to sing Annina in La Traviata for Glyndebourne on Tour.

During the pandemic of 2020, even with many cancellations, Barnett-Jones made her debuts with The Grange Festival in Precipice and her European Debut as Madame Flora in Menotti's The Medium at Oper Frankfurt Conducted by Sebastian Wiegle and Directed by Hans Walter Richter.

In 2021 she competed in BBC Cardiff Singer of the World at less than 12 hours notice, when singer had to quarantine in line with COVID guidelines at the time. She went on to win her round and competed in the Final. She won the Dame Joan Sutherland Audience Prize.

Barnett-Jones has recorded with the BBC Philharmonic Orchestra, London Philharmonic Orchestra, Royal Scottish National Orchestra, City of Birmingham Symphony Orchestra, The Academy of Ancient Music, The Royal Concertgebouw Orchestra, BBC Symphony Orchestra and at The Wigmore Hall.

== Awards ==
- Elizabeth Connell Prize for Dramatic Soprano's and Mezzo's 2021 financial award, and 3rd place in the 2023 Elizabeth Connell prize.
- Dame Joan Sutherland Audience Prize and Finalist at BBC Cardiff Singer of the World 2021
- Lilian Baylis Award from English National Opera for Outstanding Potential in Opera 2019
- The Grange Festival Opera International Singer Competition 2nd Prize, Villa Medici Prize and Waynflete Singers Prize 2019
- Operalia quarter finalist 2019
- Wagner Prize of the Netherlands, Junior Jury Prize and Finalist at International Vocal Competition s'Hertogenbosch 2017
- Glyndebourne Festival Opera Wessex Glyndebourne Association Award 2017
- Dame Patricia Routledge English Song Prize 2016

== Personal life ==
Barnett-Jones is dyslexic.
