= Masabane Cecilia Rangwanasha =

South African operatic soprano (born 1993)

- Born: November 4, 1993 (age 32); Lebowakgomo, Limpopo, South Africa
- Education: Tshwane University of Technology; University of Cape Town
- Occupations: Operatic and concert soprano
- Notable work: Die Zauberflöte, Mandela Trilogy, Porgy and Bess
- Awards: Audience Award – International Hans Gabor Belvedere Singing Competition (2019); Song Prize – BBC Cardiff Singer of the World (2021); Herbert von Karajan Prize (2024)

Masabane Cecilia Rangwanasha (born 4 November 1993) is a South African operatic and concert soprano.

== Early life ==
She was born in Lebowakgomo, Limpopo province. She started singing at school and in church at a very young age. She was educated at the University of Cape Town. She was a "Young Artist" with the Cape Town Opera company for two years, and appeared in Die Zauberflöte, Mandela Trilogy and Porgy and Bess. She won the audience award at the International Hans Gabor Belvedere Singing Competition in 2019.

Masabane obtained a BTech in Vocal Art (Performance) after studying under Kiewiet Lengana Pali at Tshwane University of Technology.

She won the Song Award in the 2021 BBC Cardiff Singer of the World competition, becoming the first African to do so. She was also a finalist for the main Singer of the World award.

She appeared at the First Night of the Proms in 2022, as a soloist in Verdi's Requiem, and in 2023 she sang again at the Proms, in a concert featuring the National Youth Orchestra of Great Britain.

In March 2024 Masabane Cecilia Rangwanasha was awarded the Herbert von Karajan Prize.

== Awards ==
- 2017: First Prize in the Phillip H Moore Music Competition
- 2018: First Prize and Best South African Song in the ATKV Singing Competition
- 2019: Hans Gabor Belvedere Competition
- 2019: Second prize in the Schock Philips Foundation competition at UCT
- 2021: Song Prize in the BBC Cardiff Singer of the World competition
- 2024: Herbert von Karajan Prize.
