= Geraint Stanley Jones =

Welsh television executive

Geraint Stanley Jones CBE (26 April 1936 – 15 August 2015) was a Welsh television executive. From 1981 to 1989, Jones was the Controller of BBC Wales, from which he oversaw the launch of S4C, the Welsh-language public-service television channel, in 1982. Jones also served as the chief executive of S4C from 1989 to 1994.

In 1960, Jones began his career in television broadcasting as a studio manager for BBC Wales. He was elevated to a television producer, before being appointed as head of programmes for BBC Wales in 1974. Jones managed the production of several notable television series during his tenure as BBC Wales' head of programmes, including Ryan and Ronnie, The Life and Times of David Lloyd George (1981), and Grand Slam. He supported Pobol y Cwm, the long-running Welsh language soap opera, which began airing in BBC Wales in October 1974 (and was transferred to S4C in 1982 upon that channel's creation). He also oversaw the launch of BBC Radio Cymru in 1977 and BBC Radio Wales in 1978.

In 1981, the Controller, or head, of BBC Wales, Owen Edwards, left his position at the BBC to shepherd the launch of S4C, a new Welsh language public-service television channel. Geraint Stanley Jones succeeded Edwards as the new Controller of BBC Wales in 1981. Jones helped to establish S4C, which commenced broadcasting on 1 November 1982, marking a significant expansion in Welsh language television programming.

Jones oversaw the creation of BBC Cardiff Singer of the World competition, which debuted in 1983, during his tenure as BBC Wales' controller.

Jones later served as the chief executive of S4C from 1989 to 1994. He was named a Commander of the Order of the British Empire (CBE) for his service to broadcasting, particularly in Welsh language television and radio, in 1993. He retired from S4C in 1994.

Additionally, Jones, a member of the Arts Council of Wales, served as the vice president of the Royal Welsh College of Music & Drama. He was also a member of the boards of directors for several organizations, including the Wales Millennium Centre, an arts centre in Cardiff, and the Welsh National Opera.

Geraint Stanley Jones died on 15 August 2015 at the age of 79.
