= Inger Dam-Jensen =

Danish operatic soprano

Inger Dam-Jensen (born 13 March 1964 in Fredriksberg) is a Danish operatic soprano. In 1993 she won the BBC Cardiff Singer of the World competition. For the last two decades she has appeared in leading roles at the Royal Danish Theatre on a regular basis. She has also appeared as a guest artist with Paris Opera and the Royal Opera, London among other major opera companies.
