= Ekaterina Scherbachenko =

Russian operatic soprano (born 1977)

- Екатерина Николаевна Щербаченко
- Born: 1977 (age 48–49); Chernobyl, Ukrainian SSR, Soviet Union
- Occupation: Opera singer (soprano)
- Years active: 2004–present

Ekaterina Nikolayevna Scherbachenko (Russian: Екатерина Николаевна Щербаченко, Yekaterina Shcherbachenko; born 1977) is a Russian operatic soprano. She was the 2009 winner of the BBC Cardiff Singer of the World competition. In April–May 2011 she appeared at La Scala, singing the role of Liù in Turandot.

Scherbachenko studied at the Moscow Conservatory until 2005. She joined the Stanislavski and Nemirovich-Danchenko Moscow Academic Music Theatre, and then the Bolshoi Theatre. Having sung the role of Lidochka in the French premiere of Shostakovich's Moscow, Cheryomushki at the Opéra de Lyon in 2004, she sang Lidochka again in 2006 in the first production at the Stanislavski complex after its long renovation. At the Stanislavski she also sang the role of Fiordiligi in Così fan tutte. While at the Bolshoi, she sang the roles of Natasha in War and Peace, Tatyana in Eugene Onegin, Mimi in La bohème, Liù in Turandot, Micaëla in Carmen and the title role in Iolanta. She also performed in Rachmaninoff's The Bells and Janáček's Glagolitic Mass.

After winning BBC Cardiff Singer of the World in June 2009, she toured with the Bolshoi, including appearances in 2010 as Tatyana at the National Centre for the Performing Arts in Beijing in April, and as Iolanta at the Dresden Opera in June. In July 2010 in Pskov she sang Olga in The Maid of Pskov, in a Bolshoi production at the Pskov Kremlin marking the 500th anniversary of the absorption of that city by the Grand Duchy of Moscow. She has also appeared as Tatyana at the Monte Carlo Opera, and as Liù at La Scala.
