= David Malis =

American operatic baritone

David Malis (born c. 1957) is an American operatic baritone. In 1985 he won the BBC Cardiff Singer of the World competition. His roles include Papageno in Mozart's The Magic Flute.
