= Grigore Leșe =

Romanian musician (born 1954)

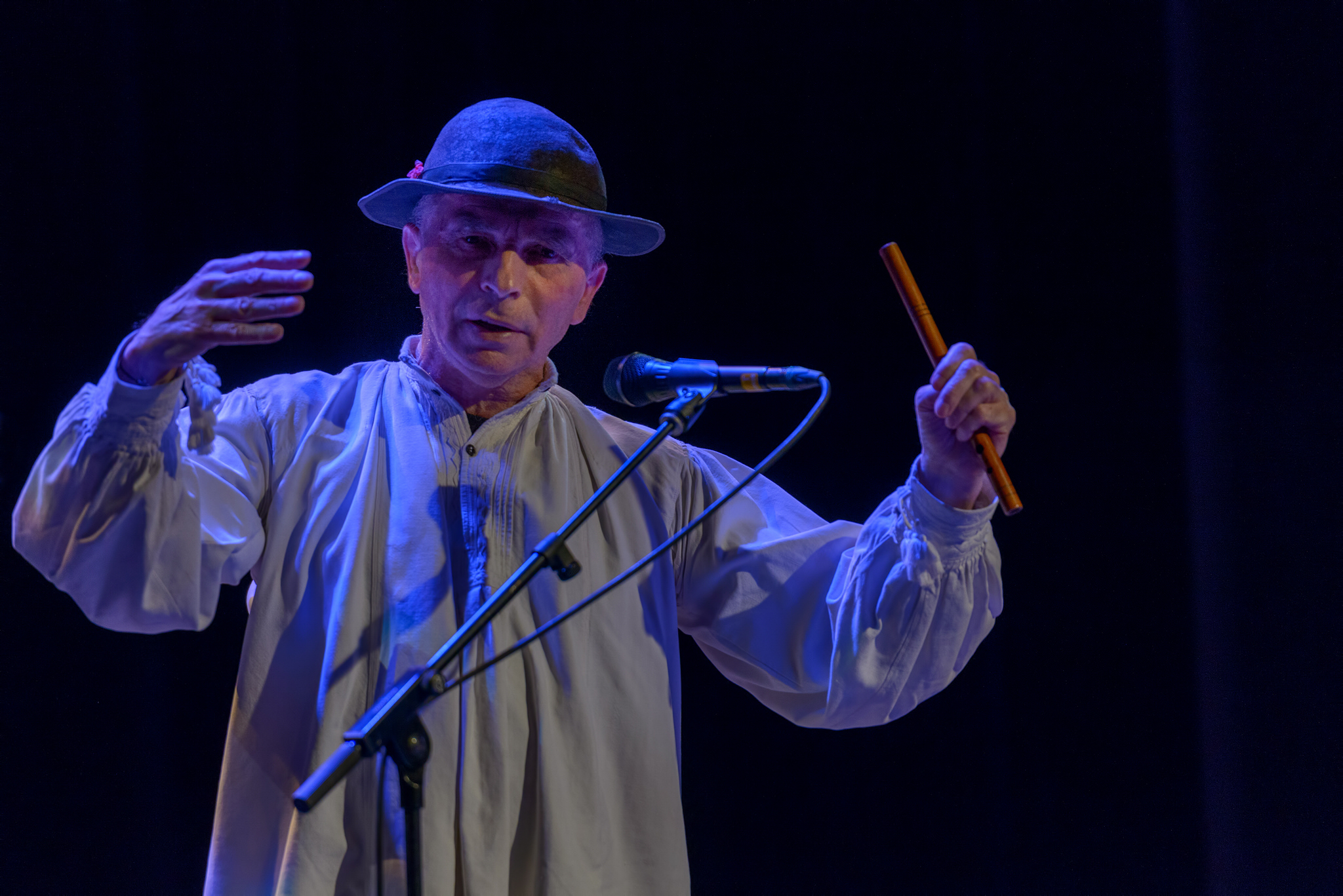
Grigore Leșe, Brussels 2018

Grigore Leșe (born February 20, 1954) is a Romanian musician.

== Biography ==
Leșe was born in 1954 in Stoiceni village, Maramureș County in northern Romania. He graduated from the Music College in Baia Mare, followed by the Music Academy in Cluj.

In 2003 he received a Ph.D. in music, with the thesis Horea în grumaz. Considerații teoretice și practice ale interpretării genului dintr-o perspectivă stilistică. From 2005 he was an associate professor of ethnomusicology at the University of Bucharest. One year later, in 2006, he started doing shows for the public national radio and the public national television, for which he was awarded with national and international prizes in journalism. In 2007 he received the great prize of the Romanian Association of Television Professionals (APTR), in 2009 the prize for cultural journalism awarded by Radio Romania, and in 2009 he was nominated at the International Shanghai Film and Television Festival.

Leșe is the first Romanian musician that brought with him on the stage traditional artists from other cultures and countries such as Iran, Syria, and Pakistan, with the purpose of demonstrating the relationship between old music in Romania and the East.

His music was selected for several feature films and documentaries from Romania and other countries, such as The Pharaoh, Gunpowder, Treason and Plot (a BBC production), and Wild Carpathia (a Travel Channel production).

He was invited to perform worldwide at festivals in Washington, D.C., Bloomington, Paris, Berlin, Athens, Montreal, Basel, Morelia, Frankfurt, and London.

Leșe sings a popular version of the Romanian folk song "Cântă cucu-n Bucovina" ("Sings the Cuckoo in Bukovina").

== Discography ==
Leșe has recorded seven albums:

- 1996, Cântec pastoral, Amori Label, Lausanne
- 2000–2003, Cântece de cătănie și hori, Concert Society, Bistrița
- 2005, Horile vieții and Așteptând Crăciunul, Roton
- 2009, Grigore Leșe: Le chant de Lăpuș, OCORA Radio France, Paris
- 2011, Grigore Leșe și aromânii fârșeroți din Cogealac, A&A Records
- 2011, De dragoste, de război, de moarte, de unul singur, Humanitas Multimedia
