= Valeria Esposito =

Italian operatic soprano

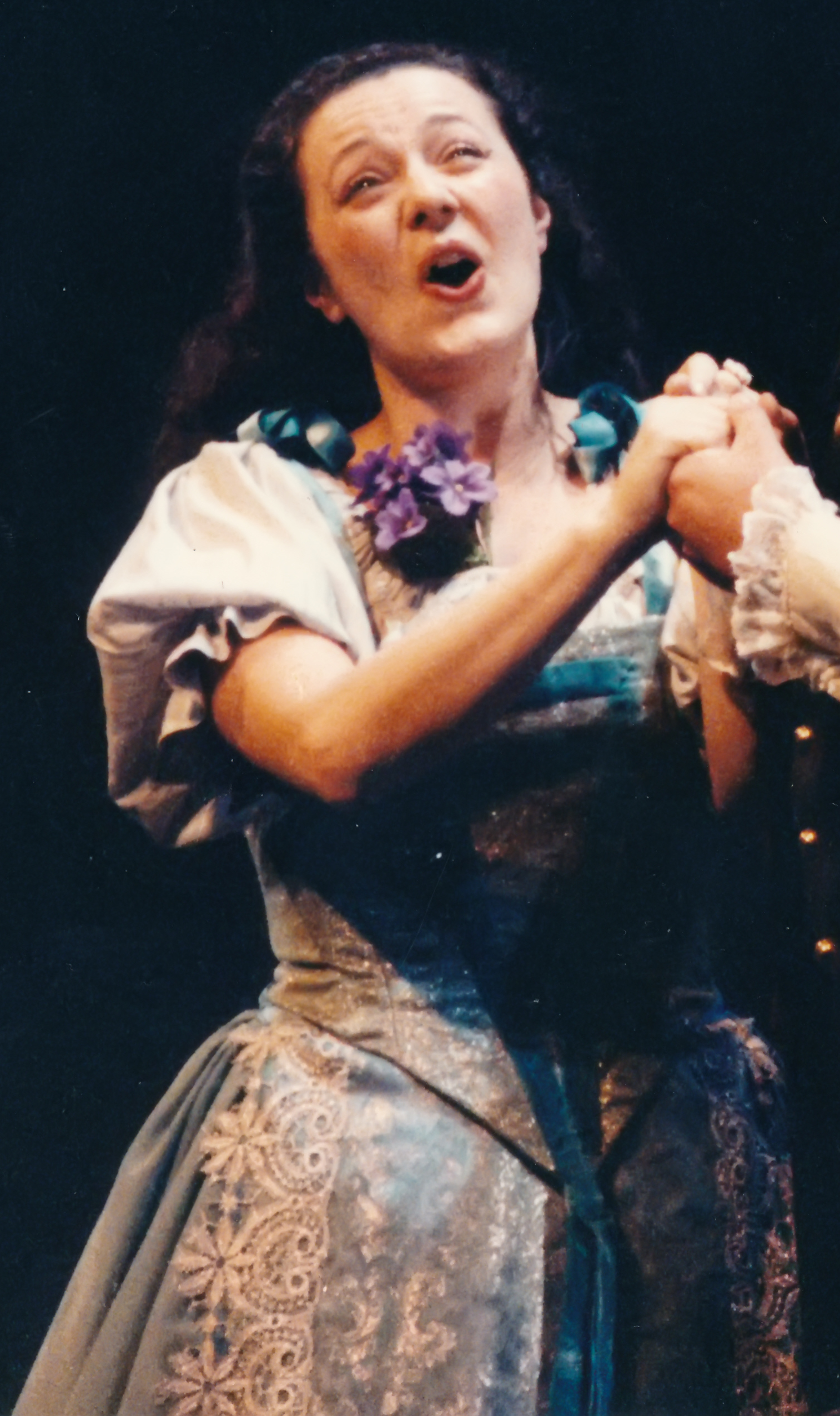
Image of Valeria Esposito

Valeria Esposito (born 1961 in Naples) is an Italian operatic soprano. She won the Singer of the World prize in the 1987 BBC Cardiff Singer of the World competition.
