= Catriona Morison =

Scottish singer

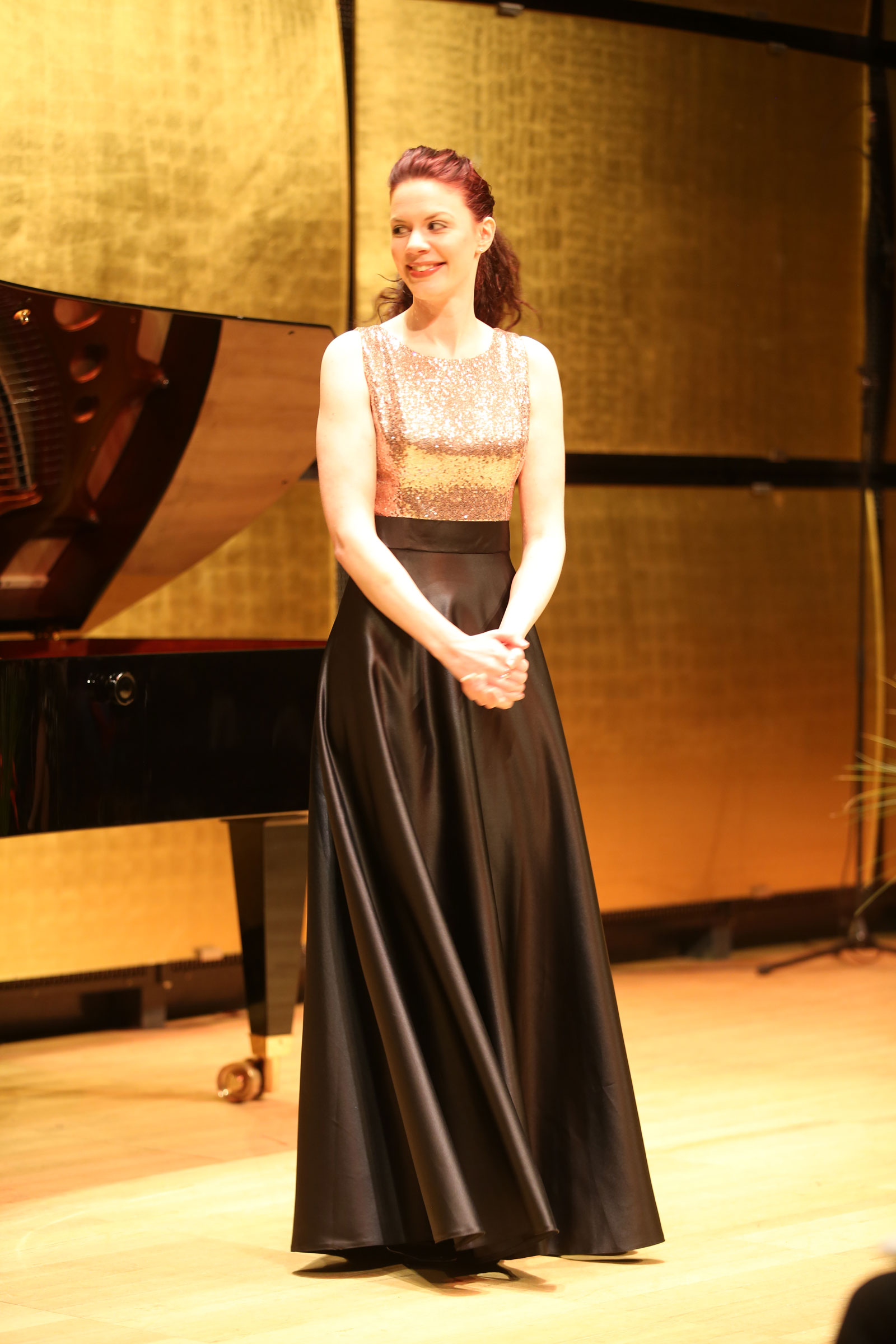
Catriona Morison in 2015

Catriona Morison (born 1986 in Edinburgh) is a Scottish mezzo-soprano.

== Early life and education ==
The daughter of a musician mother (Fiona) and a teacher of German (Alan), Morison grew up in Barnton, Edinburgh. Both she and her sister played violin and sang in choirs such as the Waverley Singers as youths. Morison also played the viola in her youth. She formally studied music at the Royal Scottish Academy of Music and Drama (now the Royal Conservatoire of Scotland [RCS]), and spent a year in Berlin on the Erasmus programme. In Berlin, at the Universität der Künste, her teachers included Julie Kaufmann.

== Career ==
Morison began her professional singing career in Germany, initially with an opera studio in Weimar. She subsequently joined Oper Wuppertal as a company artist, and won a Festengagement (company principal singer) there.

In the 2017 BBC Cardiff Singer of the World competition, Morison was the joint winner of the Song Prize and the winner of the Main Prize, the first British singer ever to win the Main Prize. Morison became a member of the BBC New Generation Artists scheme, for the scheduled period of 2017–2019. Her professional song recital debut was in January 2018, at the Queen's Hall in Edinburgh.

In October 2017, Morison received an honorary professorship from the RCS.
