= Marius Brenciu =

Romanian operatic tenor

Marius Brenciu (born 11 November 1973 in Brașov) is a Romanian operatic tenor. He won the BBC Cardiff Singer of the World competition in 2001.

He won the second prize at the Queen Elisabeth Competition in 2000; he was a jury member on that competition in 2018.

His older brother is the singer of popular music Horia Brenciu.
