= Siân Pari Huws =

Welsh journalist and broadcaster

- Born: 2 September 1960; St Asaph, Denbighshire, Wales
- Died: 29 November 2015 (aged 55)
- Education: Aberystwyth University
- Occupations: Journalist, television presenter and radio personality
- Television: Hanes Cymru a'r Môr; BBC Cardiff Singer of the World

Siân Pari Huws (2 September 1960 – 29 November 2015) was a journalist and broadcaster. She worked for BBC Cymru Wales in Cardiff and broadcast in Welsh and English.

== Biography ==
A sea captain's daughter, Siân Pari Huws was born in St Asaph and the family moved to the Wirral. She spent her childhood in Spital, Bebington. She attended Wirral Grammar School for Girls and went on to study in Aberystwyth University. She died of cancer at the age of 55 on 29 November 2015, leaving her partner, Geraint, her mother Eira and brothers Alun and Geraint.

== Career ==
She joined the BBC in Cardiff in the early 1980s. She presented Good Morning Wales on BBC Radio Wales from Cardiff before moving to Bangor to present Good Evening Wales. She occasionally presented Post Prynhawn on Radio Cymru along with many other programmes. She was also a familiar voice on Radio 3 presenting concerts by the BBC National Orchestra of Wales and BBC Cardiff Singer of the World. She worked as a freelance presenter, producer and media coach. She presented a series for S4C - Hanes Cymru a'r Môr - looking at the maritime history of Wales.
