= Cântă cucu-n Bucovina =

Romanian folk song

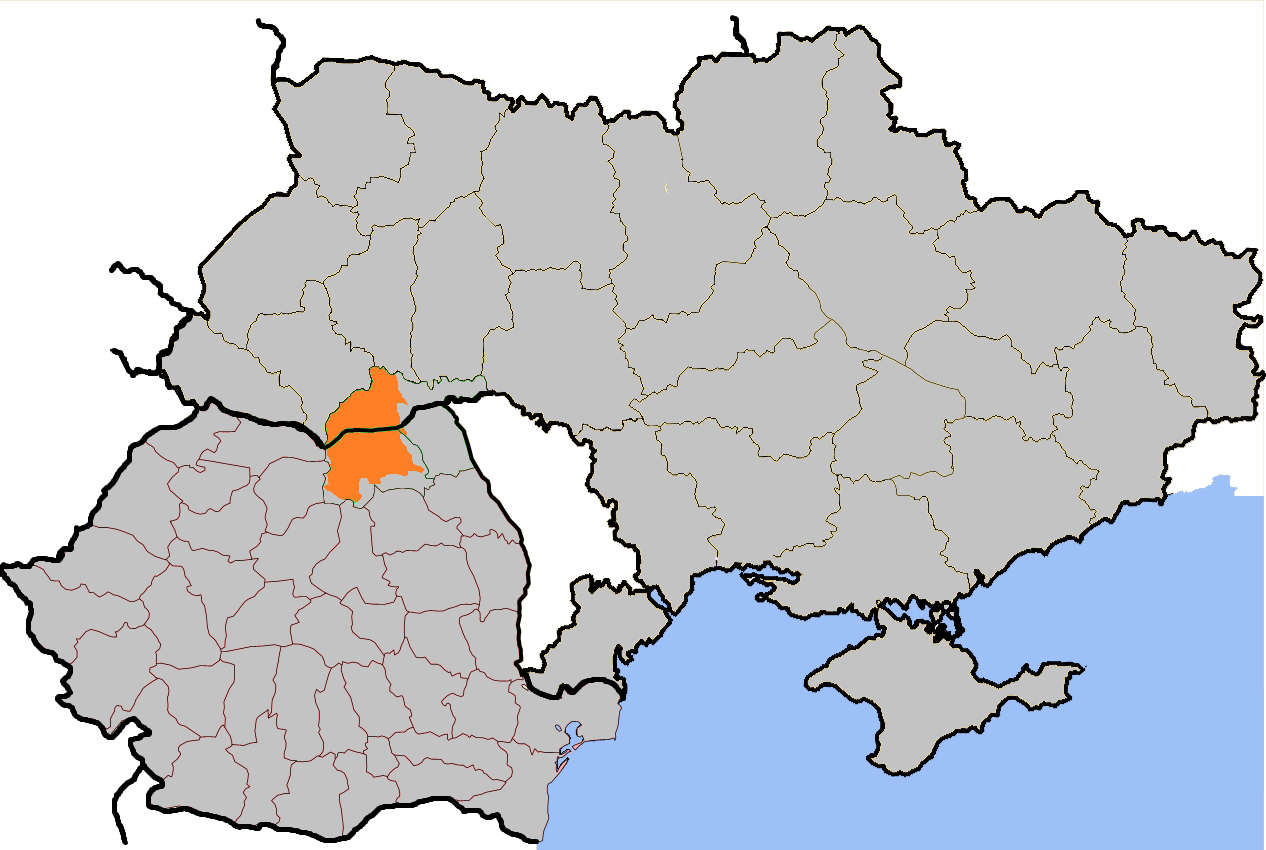
Map of the region of Bukovina, divided between Romania and Ukraine

"Cântă cucu-n Bucovina" or "Cântă cucu în Bucovina" (transl. 'Sings the Cuckoo in Bukovina') is a Romanian folk song, more precisely a doină, composed in 1904 by Constantin Mandicevschi. The lyrics are original, while the melody is a modified Bukovinian mourning song. Mandicevschi composed it at the request of Spiru Haret for the 400th anniversary of the death of Prince of Moldavia Stephen the Great, which was commemorated in Putna (then in Austria-Hungary and now in Romania) in the same year. The song is also known as "Cântă cucul, bată-l vina" (transl. "Sings the Cuckoo, Blame It"), "Bucovină, plai cu flori" (transl. "Bukovina, Field with Flowers"), "Cântec pentru Bucovina" (transl. "Song for Bukovina") and "Cântec despre Bucovina" (transl. "Song About Bukovina").

Famous singers of the song include ADDA, Grigore Leșe and Valentina Nafornița. The song was sung in 2022 by a children's choir at the Antim Monastery during a meeting between the Georgian ambassador to Romania Nikoloz Nikolozishvili and the Romanian Orthodox bishop Varlaam Merticariu in which the latter gave the former the Order of St. Anthim the Iberian.

The lyrics of the song, on the version sung by Leșe, are the following:

Cânta cucu bată-l vina
De răsună Bucovina
Cânta cucu bată-l vina
De răsună Bucovina
Cântă cucu-ntr-un brăduț
De răsună-n Cernăuți

Bucovină, plai cu flori
Unde-ți sunt ai tăi feciori?
Bucovină, plai cu flori
Unde-ți sunt ai tăi feciori?

Au fost duși în altă țară
Dar se-ntorc la primăvară
Au fost duși în altă țară
Dar se-ntorc la primăvară

Au fost duși în altă țară
Dar se-ntorc la primăvară
Au fost duși în altă țară
Dar se-ntorc la primăvară

Înapoi când or veni
Tot pe tine te-or iubi
Munților cu creasta rară
Nu lăsați straja să piară
Munților cu creasta rară
Nu lăsați straja să piară

Dacă piere straja voastră
A pierit și țara noastră
Dacă piere straja voastră
A pierit și țara noastră

Translation:

Sings the cuckoo, blame it
Of echo in Bukovina
Sings the cuckoo, blame it
Of echo in Bukovina
Sings the cuckoo in a small fir
It echoes in Chernivtsi

Bukovina, field with flowers
Where are your sons?
Bukovina, field with flowers
Where are your sons?

They were taken to another country
But they will return in spring
They were taken to another country
But they will return in spring

They were taken to another country
But they will return in spring
They were taken to another country
But they will return in spring

Back when they will come
They will still love you
Mountains with a rare crest
Do not let your guard down
Mountains with a rare crest
Do not let your guard down

If your guard dies down
So our country will have died
If your guard dies down
So our country will have died
