= Buddug Verona James =

Welsh singer

- Born: Buddug Verona James; Cardigan, Wales
- Education: Guildhall School of Music and Drama
- Occupations: Singer, actress

Buddug Verona James is a Welsh mezzo-soprano opera singer who studied at the Guildhall School of Music and Drama, the National Opera Studio and in Rome. She was born in Cardigan, Wales.

== Career ==
Among her operatic roles James has performed Gluck's Orfeo in America and Canada, Dardano in Handel’s Amadigi in New York and Europe, and Cherubino in Mozart's The Marriage of Figaro in Tokyo and Toronto.

She has worked with Netherlands Opera, Cleveland Opera (USA), Glyndebourne, Almeida Opera, Opera Theatre Company, Opera Northern Ireland, Opera North, Opera Atelier, Opera Circus, English Pocket Opera, Opera 80, Cambridge Handel Opera Group, Operavox Cartoons, Siobhan Davies Dance Company, Music Theatre Wales and Mid Wales Opera.

On her website, James describes herself as "Opera Singer, Actress and Butcher", because before pursuing her studies she worked in one of her father's butcher shops in Cardigan and won an award for her artistry in the Royal Welsh Show in 1978.

She has premiered in operas by Gerald Barry, Jonathan Dove, Deirdre Gribbin, Wolfgang Rihm and John Woolrich.

James has filmed numerous straight acting roles for BBC, HTV and S4C and performed Lady Capulet in Romeo and Juliet for the National Theatre of Wales.

In 2001, James and her siblings performed in the Millennium Stadium as pre-match entertainment before a Wales/Ireland rugby union match.

She is on the professorial staff in the department of Vocal and Opera Studies at the Royal Welsh College of Music & Drama (RWCMD). She has also directed The Pirates of Penzance, Ruddigore, Acis and Galatea, Dido and Aeneas, Orpheus in the Underworld and Hercules for RWCMD.

== Discography ==
- Buddug Verona James - Castradïva
- Buddug Verona James - Songs of the People

She also appears on:

- Thomas Chilcot - Songs and Concertos
- The James Sisters Sing Gospel

== Awards ==
- Welsh Singers Competition 1986
- In 2001 James was honoured with the Druidic White Robe of Gorsedd y Beirdd at the National Eisteddfod.
