= BBC Cardiff Singer of the World competition =

Classical singing competition in Wales

- The current logo used since 2017
- Awarded for: Singing
- Sponsored by: BBC and Cardiff Council (main event); Wigmore Hall (Song Prize), Cardiff University School of Music (Audience Prize)
- Location: St David's Hall, Cardiff
- Country: Wales, United Kingdom
- Presented by: BBC
- Formerly called: Cardiff Singer of the World; BBC Singer of the World in Cardiff
- Rewards: The Cardiff Trophy and £20,000 (main prize); Song Prize Trophy and £10,000 (song prize); Crystal trophy and £2,500 (Dame Kiri Te Kanawa Audience Prize)
- First award: 1983; 43 years ago
- Winner(s): Adolfo Corrado, 2023
- Website: BBC Cardiff Singer of the World website

Television/radio coverage
- Network: BBC Four, BBC Two Wales, S4C, BBC Radio Wales, BBC Radio 3, BBC Radio Cymru.
- The previous logo used from 2007 to 2015
- Related: Welsh Singers Showcase

BBC Cardiff Singer of the World competition (known as Cardiff Singer of the World from 1983 to 2001 and BBC Singer of the World in Cardiff in 2003) is a competition for classical singers held every two years.

The competition was started by BBC Wales in 1983 to celebrate the opening of St David's Hall in Cardiff, Wales, home of the BBC National Orchestra of Wales. The creation of the competition was overseen by Geraint Stanley Jones, who was the controller at BBC Wales at the time.

Auditions are held throughout the world in the autumn before the competition, with singers being selected to take part in Cardiff the following June. Each singer represents their own country. In Wales there is a competition to select the national representative; the winner of the Welsh Singers Showcase represents Wales in BBC Cardiff Singer of the World competition.

The competition is judged by a panel of distinguished opera singers, musicians and music professionals. In 2003 an audience prize was also introduced for the primary competition; in 2011 it was renamed the Dame Joan Sutherland Audience Prize to mark the passing of the singer who was the competition's first patron.

== History ==
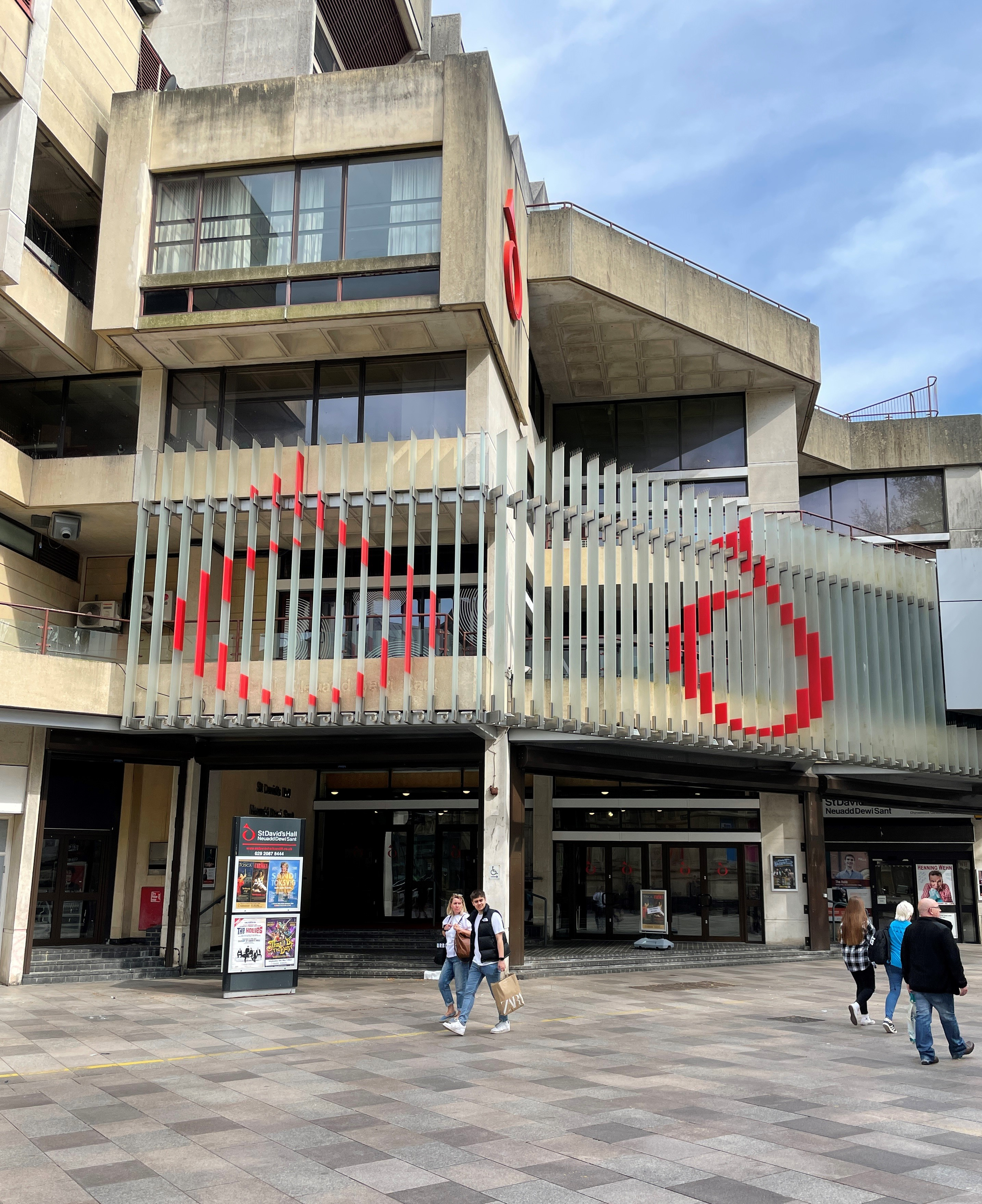
The competition's final has been held at St David's Hall since it began in 1983

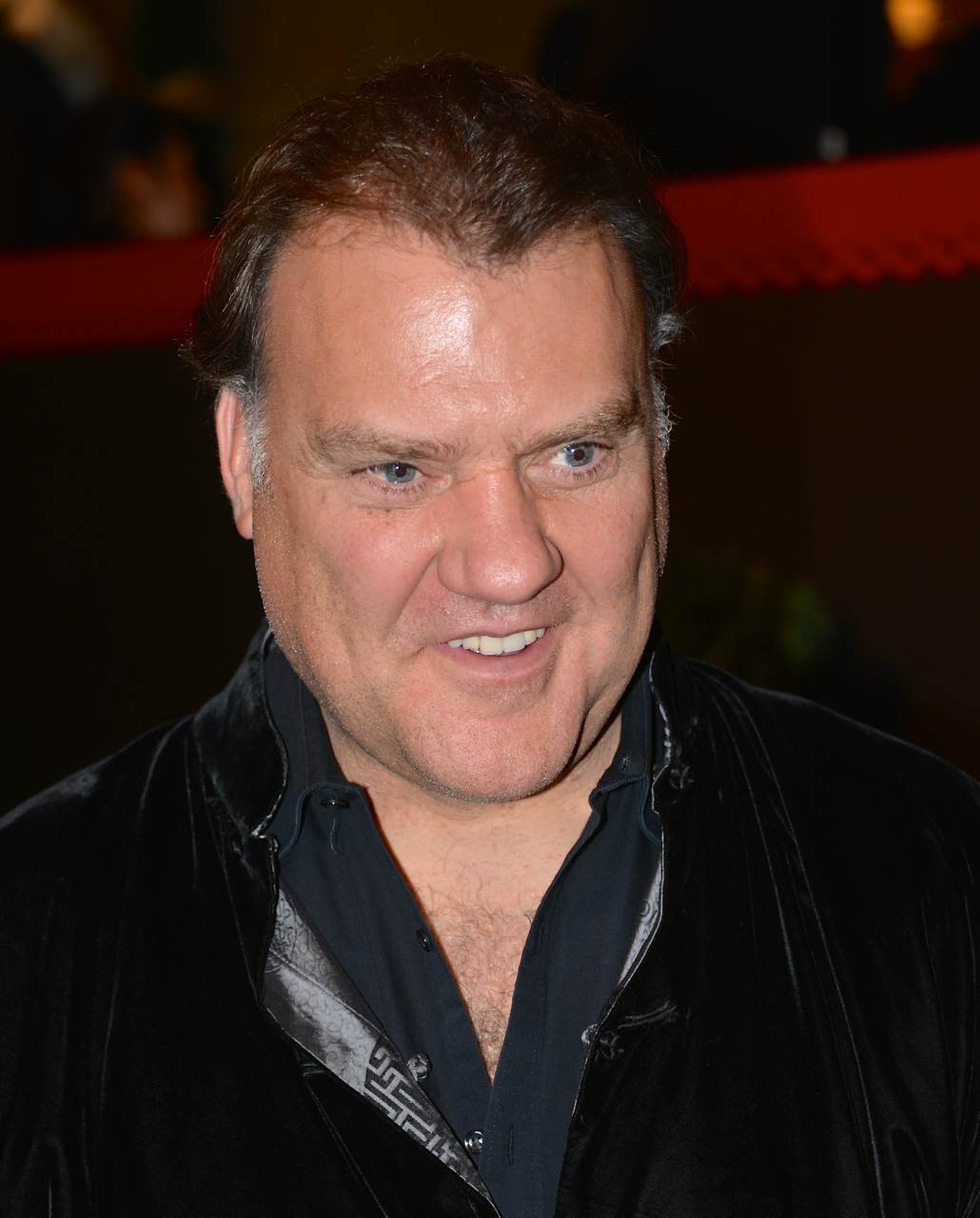
Bryn Terfel won the inaugural Lieder Prize in 1989.

In 1983, the first year of the competition, eighteen singers participated. The winner was Finnish soprano Karita Mattila.

A Lieder Prize was introduced in 1989, as art song and opera are both important forms of singing, but very different. The 1989 competition was particularly noteworthy with Welsh baritone Bryn Terfel winning the Lieder prize and Russian baritone Dmitri Hvorostovsky taking the overall title. Both singers went on to enjoy successful careers with international acclaim.

The "Song Prize" (formerly the "Lieder Prize") was renamed in 2001 in order to clarify that it applies to art song and folksong rather than German Lieder only. The "Song Prize" became a separate event in 2003, named as the BBC Cardiff Singer of the World Rosenblatt Recital Song Prize. However, after the 2009 competition, its name was changed to BBC Cardiff Singer of the World Song Prize. It is not compulsory, and the only entry requirement is that the singer is taking part in the primary competition. It is not possible to enter for the "Song Prize" only. In 2001, Romanian tenor Marius Brenciu became the first singer to win both prizes.

Finnish baritone Tommi Hakala won in 2003, with the Song Prize going to Irish soprano Ailish Tynan. The first "Audience Prize", voted for by the audience both in the hall and for the broadcasts, was awarded to Chilean soprano Angela Marambio.

The 2005 prize was won by American soprano Nicole Cabell, with English tenor Andrew Kennedy winning the "Song Prize" and the "Audience Prize" being won by Korean soprano Ha-Joung Lee.

Chinese singer Shen Yang (subsequently known as Shenyang) won the 2007 competition, The "Song Prize" was won by English soprano Elizabeth Watts, while Jacques Imbrailo, South African baritone, won the "Audience Prize".

In 2009, the winner was Russian soprano Ekaterina Scherbachenko. The winner of the "Song Prize" was bass Jan Martinik from the Czech Republic and Italian tenor Giordano Luca took the "Audience Prize".

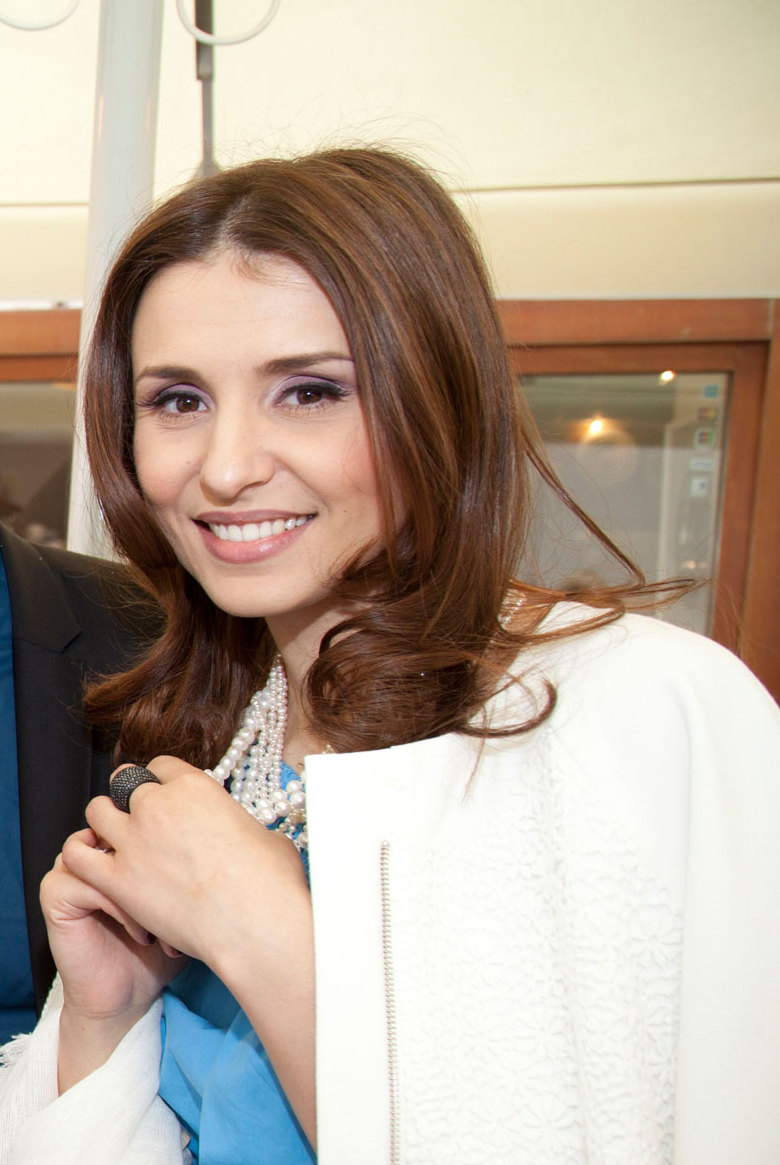
In 2011, Valentina Nafornița was the winner of the main prize.

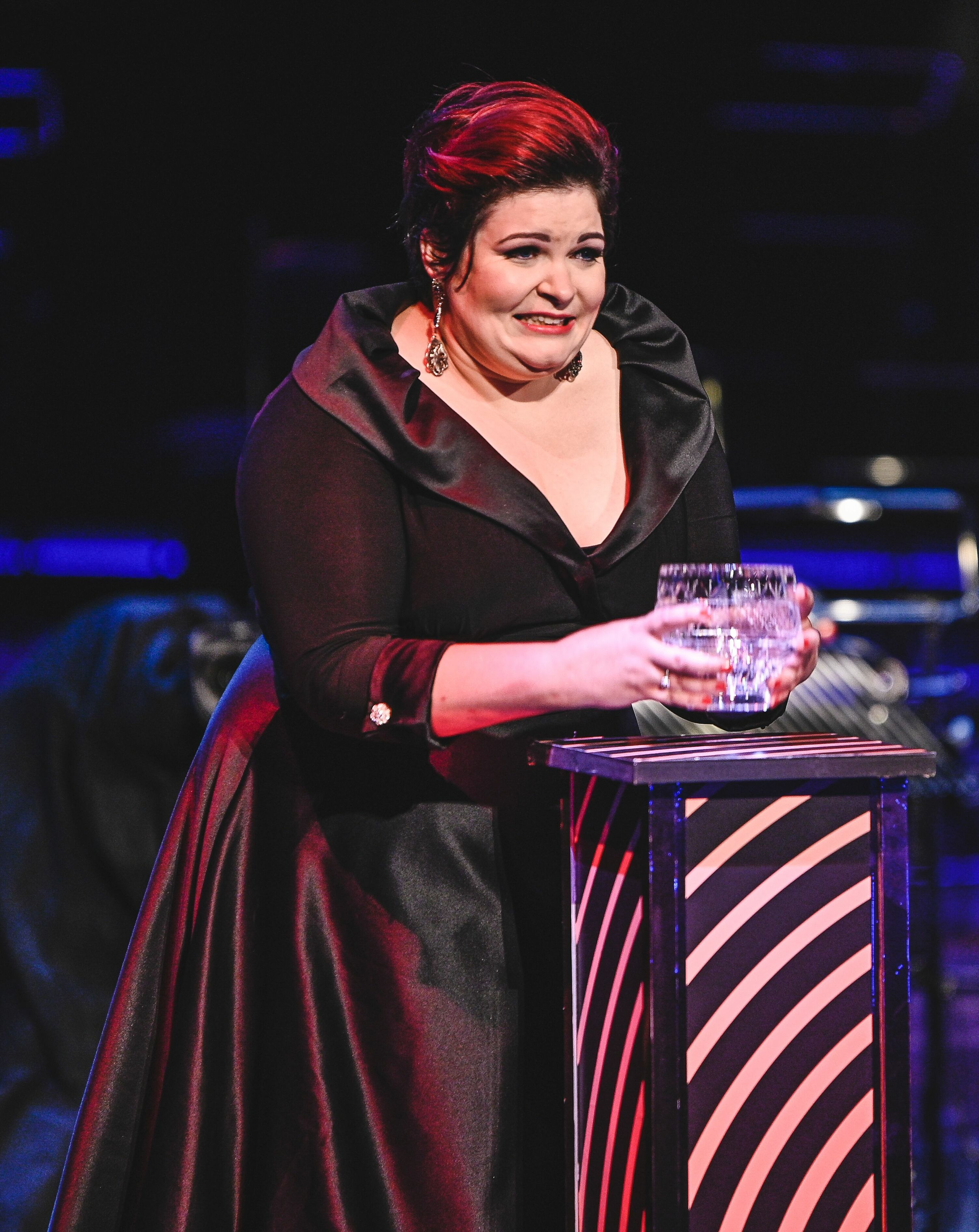
In 2021, Claire Barnett-Jones was the winner of the Audience Prize.

Followed a revised format and schedule, the 2011 competition had 20 singers taking part in four preliminary concerts. The 2011 winner was Moldovan soprano Valentina Naforniță, who also won the newly renamed "Dame Joan Sutherland Audience Prize". The "Song Prize" was won by Ukrainian baritone Andrei Bondarenko.

The 30th anniversary competition took place between 16 and 23 June 2013. It was won by US mezzo-soprano Jamie Barton, who also won the "Song Prize". The "Dame Joan Sutherland Audience Prize" was won by English tenor Ben Johnson.

Many non-winning finalists have gone on to very distinguished operatic careers. Examples include Finnish soprano Soile Isokoski in 1987, Swedish dramatic soprano Nina Stemme in 1993 and Latvian mezzo-soprano Elina Garanca in 2001.

The 2025 edition of the competition has been postponed until 2027 due to the host venue, St David's Hall, being closed to allow for essential work to be carried out to replace the roof. The competition instead staged a televised gala concert, featuring previous winners and competitors, in October 2025 as part of the Wales Millennium Centre's Llais international music festival.

== Organisation ==
The competition is organised by BBC Cymru Wales and was televised nationwide by BBC Two until 2013 and on BBC Four since 2003 (BBC Knowledge in 2001). Additionally, the competition is televised by BBC Two Wales, in Welsh on S4C and broadcast over radio channels BBC Radio 3, BBC Radio Wales and the Welsh language BBC Radio Cymru. All coverage can also be found on BBC iPlayer. It is supported by Welsh National Opera and the Cardiff Council.

From 2003, the competition's first patron was Dame Joan Sutherland, until her death in 2010. Since 2011, the patron has been Dame Kiri Te Kanawa.

=== Presenters ===
The following have hosted stages of the competition:

BBC Two (1983–2011), BBC Knowledge (2001) and BBC Four (2003–present)

- Brian Kay (1983–1987)
- Frank Lincoln (1983)
- Chris Stuart (1989)
- Humphrey Burton (1991)
- Natalie Wheen (1993–1997)
- Iain Burnside (1993–1997)
- Michael White (1995)
- Huw Edwards (1997–2009)
- Petroc Trelawny (1999–present)
- Gwenan Edwards (1999–2003)
- Barbara Bonney (2001, 2003)
- Aled Jones (2003, 2005)
- Sian Williams (2007)
- Danielle de Niese (2013)
- Angel Blue (2015, 2017)
- Josie D'Arby (2019–present)

BBC Radio 3 live coverage

- Catherine Bott (2007, 2009)
- Fiona Talkington (2009)
- Iain Burnside (2011–2015, 2019, 2023)
- Donald Macleod (2011, 2013)
- Susan Bullock (2015)
- Kate Molleson (2017–2019)
- Rebecca Evans (2019–present)
- Andrew McGregor (2021)

BBC Two Wales highlights

- Aled Jones (2007, 2009)
- Josie D'Arby (2009–present)
- Tim Rhys-Evans (2011–2021)
- Connie Fisher (2011, 2013)
- Petroc Trelawny (2023)

BBC Radio Wales

- Nicola Heywood-Thomas (2009–2015, 2021)
- Beverley Humphreys (2011, 2013, 2019, 2023)
- Wynne Evans (2015–2023)
- Rebecca Evans (2017)

BBC Radio Cymru

- Siân Pari Huws (2009–2015)
- Alwyn Humphreys (2009–2013, 2019)
- Beti George (2009–2013, 2019)
- Alun Guy (2013)
- Nia Roberts (2017)
- Heledd Cynwal (2019)

S4C highlights

- Siân Pari Huws (2013)
- Heledd Cynwal (2015, 2017)

=== Jury ===
Many prominent singers have served in the jury, including Carlo Bergonzi, Sir Geraint Evans, Marilyn Horne, Gundula Janowitz, Dame Kiri Te Kanawa, Sherrill Milnes, Christoph Prégardien, Dame Joan Sutherland, Dame Anne Evans, René Kollo, Galina Vishnevskaya and Dame Gwyneth Jones, Irina Arkhipova and Shen Xiang. There is a separate jury for the "Song Prize", with some members serving on both juries. The 2019 jury included Dame Felicity Lott and Robert Holl.

On the day between the two competition finals, some of the jury members give master classes to some of the non-finalists, which are open to the public.

== Competition winners ==
=== Overall winners ===
Here are the overall winners of Cardiff Singer of the World since the contest's inception in 1983.

Year	Country	Contestant	Voice type
1983	Finland	Karita Mattila	Soprano
1985	United States	David Malis	Baritone
1987	Italy	Valeria Esposito	Soprano
1989	Soviet Union	Dmitri Hvorostovsky	Baritone
1991	Australia	Lisa Gasteen	Soprano
1993	Denmark	Inger Dam-Jensen	Soprano
1995	Sweden	Katarina Karnéus	Mezzo-soprano
1997	China	Guang Yang	Mezzo-soprano
1999	Germany	Anja Harteros	Soprano
2001	Romania	Marius Brenciu	Tenor
2003	Finland	Tommi Hakala	Baritone
2005	United States	Nicole Cabell	Soprano
2007	China	Shenyang	Bass-baritone
2009	Russia	Ekaterina Scherbachenko	Soprano
2011	Moldova	Valentina Naforniță	Soprano
2013	United States	Jamie Barton	Mezzo-soprano
2015	Belarus	Nadine Koutcher	Soprano
2017	Scotland	Catriona Morison	Mezzo-soprano
2019	Ukraine	Andrei Kymach	Baritone
2021	South Korea	Gihoon Kim	Baritone
2023	Italy	Adolfo Corrado	Bass

=== "Song Prize" winners ===
This prize was introduced in 1989; it was formerly known as the "Lieder Prize". Here are all the contestants who achieved the Song Prize since then.

Year	Country	Contestant	Voice type
1989	Wales	Bryn Terfel	Bass-baritone
1991	Wales	Neal Davies	Bass-baritone
1993	New Zealand	Paul Whelan	Baritone
1995	Finland	Kirsi Tiihonen	Soprano
1997	England	Christopher Maltman	Baritone
1999	South Korea	Dae-San No	Baritone
2001	Romania	Marius Brenciu	Tenor
2003	Ireland	Ailish Tynan	Soprano
2005	England	Andrew Kennedy	Tenor
2007	England	Elizabeth Watts	Soprano
2009	Czech Republic	Jan Martiník	Bass
2011	Ukraine	Andrei Bondarenko	Baritone
2013	United States	Jamie Barton	Mezzo-soprano
2015	South Korea	Jongmin Park	Bass
2017	Mongolia	Ariunbaatar Ganbaatar	Baritone
2017	Scotland	Catriona Morison	Mezzo-soprano
2019	China	Mingjie Lei	Tenor
2021	South Africa	Masabane Cecilia Rangwanasha	Soprano
2023	South Korea	Sungho Kim	Tenor

=== Audience Prize winners ===
The "Dame Joan Sutherland Audience Prize" was introduced in 2003. In 2023 it was renamed the "Dame Kiri Te Kanawa Audience Prize".

Year	Country	Contestant	Voice type
2003	Chile	Angela Marambio	Soprano
2005	South Korea	Ha-Joung Lee	Soprano
2007	South Africa	Jacques Imbrailo	Baritone
2009	Italy	Giordano Lucà	Tenor
2011	Moldova	Valentina Naforniță	Soprano
2013	England	Ben Johnson	Tenor
2015	Mongolia	Amartuvshin Enkhbat	Baritone
2017	England	Louise Alder	Soprano
2019	England	Katie Bray	Mezzo-soprano
2021	England	Claire Barnett-Jones	Mezzo-soprano
2023	Colombia	Julieth Lozano Rolong	Soprano

== See also ==
- List of classical music competitions
