= Eleonora Vindau =

Ukrainian soprano opera singer (born 1986)

- Елеонора Віндау
- Born: 19 August 1986 (age 39); Kyiv, Ukrainian SSR
- Occupation: Opera singer (soprano)
- Spouse: Andrei Bondarenko

Eleonora Vindau (Ukrainian: Eлеонора Віндау; born 19 August 1986) is a Ukrainian soprano opera singer. She sang the role of Dunyasha in the world premiere of Alexander Smelkov's opera The Station Master, staged at the Concert Hall of the Mariinsky Theatre in 2011 and is a laureate of IV All-Russian Nadezhda Obukhova Young Opera Singers' Competition (Lipetsk, 2008) and the VIII International Rimsky-Korsakov Young Opera Singers' Competition (St Petersburg, 2008)

== Life and career ==
Vindau was born in Kyiv and graduated from the Tchaikovsky National Academy of Music of Ukraine in 2009. Since 2007, she has been a soloist with the Mariinsky Academy of Young Singers and has toured with the Mariinsky Opera where her repertoire includes:

- Xenia in Boris Godunov
- Brigitta in Iolanta
- Dunyasha in The Station Master
- Zerlina in Don Giovanni
- Countess Almaviva and Susanna in Le nozze di Figaro
- Despina in Così fan tutte
- Papagena Die Zauberflöte
- Pedro in Don Quichotte
- Echo in Ariadne auf Naxos
- Soprano soloist in Handel's Messiah

Internationally, she has sung Birgitta in Iolanta at the Gran Teatre del Liceu in Barcelona (2013) and the Théâtre du Capitole in Toulouse (2010). In 2011 she sang Lauretta in Betrothal in a Monastery at the Opéra-Comique in Paris and the Théâtre du Capitole.

Vindau was married to the Ukrainian baritone Andrei Bondarenko.
