= Katie Bray =

English mezzo-soprano (born 1987)

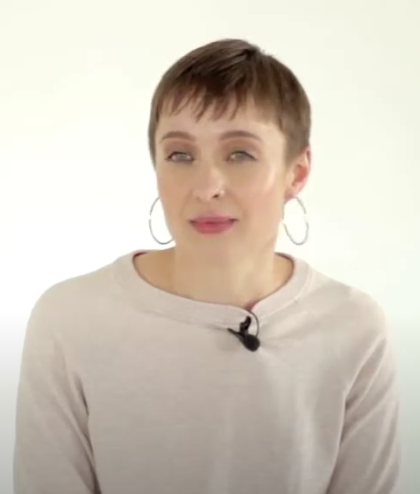
- Born: Katie Emily Bray; 23 January 1987 (age 39); Exeter, England
- Education: University of Manchester; Royal Academy of Music
- Occupation: Operatic mezzo-soprano
- Years active: 2012 – present
- Awards: Dame Joan Sutherland Audience Prize at the BBC Cardiff Singer of the World in 2019

Katie Emily Bray (born 23 January 1987) is an English coloratura mezzo-soprano and is best known as the winner of the Dame Joan Sutherland Audience Prize at the BBC Cardiff Singer of the World in 2019. She is particularly noted for her baroque repertoire.

== Early life and education ==
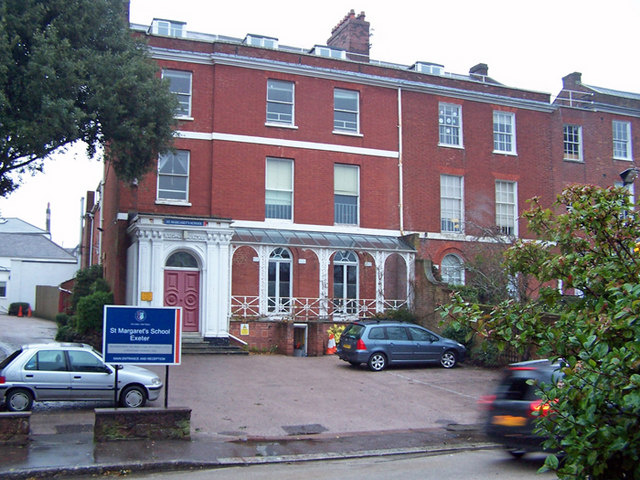
St Margaret's School, Exeter

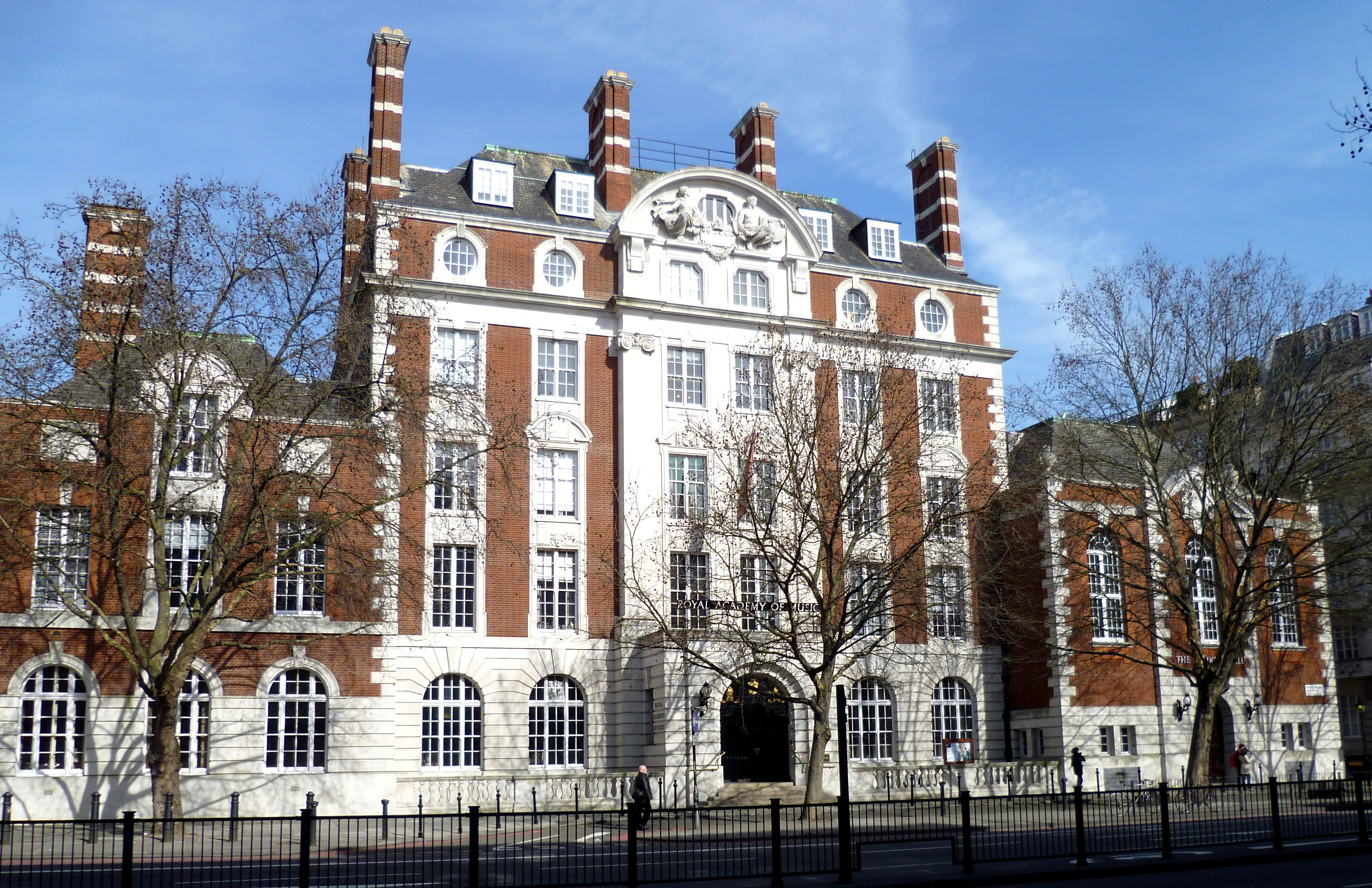
Royal Academy of Music, London

Bray was born on 23 January 1987 in Exeter, Devon, England. She was educated at St Margaret's School in Exeter until 2005 and went on to study at the University of Manchester, graduating in 2008. She then went onto study opera as a post-graduate at the Royal Academy of Music, where she was taught by Elizabeth Ritchie and Iain Ledingham, and finished her studies at the academy in 2012 having won an Alfred Alexander Scholarship and been recipient of The Karaviotis Scholarship.

== Professional career ==
In 2013, Bray made her debuts with Glyndebourne Festival Opera and English Touring Opera. Bray has also performed with Opera North, English National Opera, Scottish Opera, Welsh National Opera, Garsington Opera, Opera Holland Park, English Touring Opera and Irish National Opera. Bray has also performed in concert halls and festivals around the United Kingdom, such as Wigmore Hall, Cadogan Hall, the Holywell Music Room and St George's, Hanover Square. She has also performed recitals in many song festivals that include the City of London Festival, the London English Song Festival and the Oxford Lieder Festival.

=== Repertoire ===
- Hansel - Hansel and Gretel
- Rosina - The Barber of Seville
- Varvara - Káťa Kabanová
- Louis XV Chair/Female Cat/Owl - L'enfant et les sortilèges
- Lola - Cavalleria rusticana
- Nancy - Albert Herring
- Daughter - Akhnaten
- Lucilla - La scala di seta
- Zerlina - Don Giovanni
- Zulma - L'italiana in Algeri
- Zaida - Il turco in Italia
- Mallika - Lakmé
- Zenobia - Radamisto
- Minerva - Il ritorno d'Ulisse in patria
- Satirino - La Calisto
- Charlotte - Werther

=== Competitions and awards ===
Bray has won many singing competitions and awards, including:
- Alfred Alexander Scholarship and recipient of The Karaviotis Scholarship
- Major van Someren-Godfrey Prize for English Song (2009)
- Elena Gerhardt Lieder Prize (2010)
- Audience Prize in the Handel Singing Competition (2010)
- Third prize in the Jackdaws Vocal Award (2010)
- Sir Thomas Armstrong Prize
- Opera Prize in the Mozart International Singing Competition (2011)
- Third prize overall in Mozart International Singing Competition (2011)
- At the Royal Academy of Music she received the Principal's Prize and first prize in the Richard Lewis Singing Competition (2011)
- Represented England in the BBC Cardiff Singer of the World competition, where she won the Dame Joan Sutherland Audience Prize (2019)

== Discography ==
Bray appears on

- David Matthews: Symphony No. 7 & Vespers (2014)
- Mahler: Lieder eines fahrenden Gesellen (arr. Schoenberg) (2015)
- Rückert Lieder: Robert & Clara Schumann (2016)

== See also ==
- List of Royal Academy of Music people
- List of mezzo-sopranos in non-classical music
