= Valentina Nafornița =

Moldovan operatic soprano (born 1987)

Valentina Nafornița OR
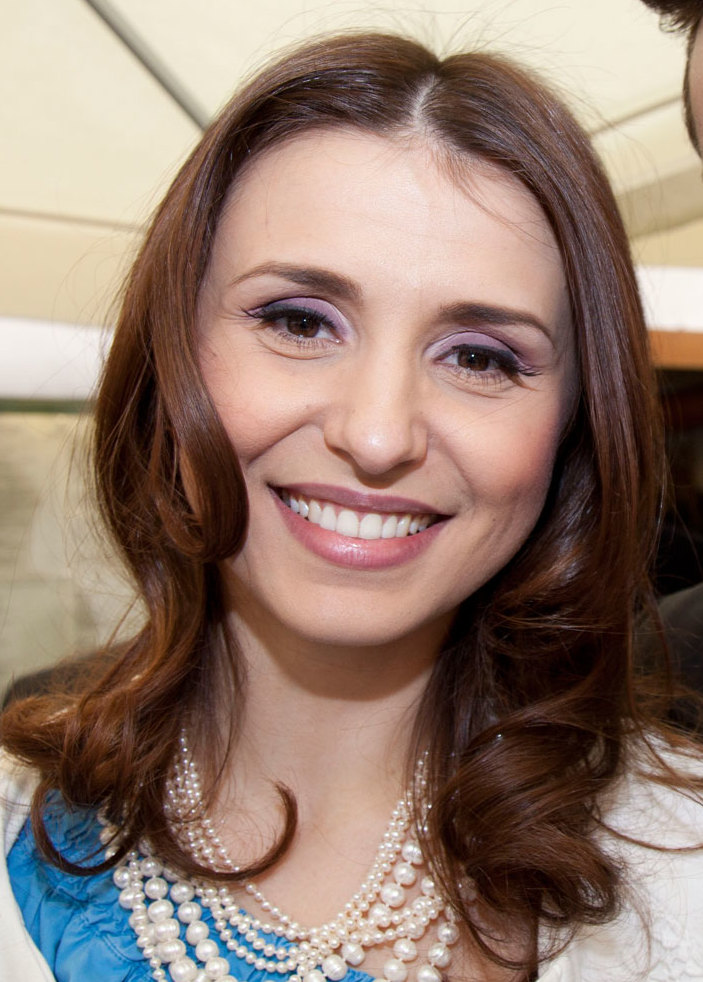
- Nafornița in 2015
- Born: 10 June 1987 (age 39); Cuhnești, Moldavian SSR, Soviet Union (now Moldova)
- Education: National University of Music Bucharest
- Occupation: Operatic soprano
- Years active: 2011–present
- Website: www.nafornita.com

Valentina Nafornița (also spelled Naforniță; born 10 June 1987) is a Moldovan operatic soprano. She is best known for her interpretation of Mozart and bel canto repertoire.

== Childhood and studies ==
Nafornița was born in Cuhnești, Moldova. Interested in music from a young age, she began studying singing, violin and dancing as a child. She went on to graduate from the Ștefan Neaga Music College (high school) in Chișinău, Moldova, in 2006, followed by a degree in Opera from the National University of Music in Bucharest, Romania. There, she studied under Eleonora Enăchescu and Maria Slătinaru-Nistor.

During and following her studies, she began entering vocal competitions, winning the Romanian Orange Prize for Young Musicians, the Hariclea Darclée Competition, and the Young Opera Singers of Europe Competition. In 2011, she won both the Singer of the World and the Dame Joan Sutherland Audience Award at the BBC Cardiff Singer of the World competition. This marked a turning point in her career.

== Career ==
In September 2011, Nafornița became a member of the Vienna State Opera ensemble, where she made her professional stage debut as Papagena in Die Zauberflöte. As a member of the ensemble, she debuted numerous roles including: Musetta (La bohème), Susanna (Le nozze di Figaro) Pamina (Die Zauberflöte), Adina (L'elisir d'amore), Norina (Don Pasquale)) Gilda (Rigoletto), Zerlina (Don Giovanni), Nayade (Ariadne auf Naxos), Clorinda (Cenerentola), Oscar (Un ballo in maschera), and Ilia (Idomeneo). Also in Vienna, in February 2013 and 2018, she was chosen as the singer to open the Vienna Opera Ball.

In 2014, she made her debut at the Salzburger Festspiele as Zerlina in Don Giovanni, and in 2016, she made her debut in Paris in the role of Sophie (Werther) at the Théâtre des Champs-Elysées opposite Juan Diego Flórez and Joyce DiDonato. The following season, in September 2017, she made her Opéra national de Paris debut as Valencienne in Die lustige Witwe, and returned to the French capital as Servilia (La clemenza di Tito) in November 2017, Adina (L'elisir d'amore) in 2018, and as the title role in Iolanta in 2019.

In 2018, Nafornița made her debut at Teatro dell'Opera di Roma as Musetta (La bohème), as well as her role and house debut as Fiordiligi in Così fan tutte at the Opéra de Lausanne. The later was broadcast on Arte, becoming one of the most viewed operas in 2018 on the channel's online platform.

Other notable debuts include Norina (Don Pasquale) in a new production (2015) by Irina Brook with Juan Diego Flórez and Michele Pertusi, conducted by Jesús López Cobos. She was invited twice to perform in the televised Christmas in Vienna concert in 2015 and 2018, broadcast on ORF III and Arte. In 2017, she made her house debut at the Staatsoper Hamburg as Adina.

Highlights of her 2019/20 season include a role debut as Helena in Britten's A Midsummer Night's Dream, Norina in Don Pasquale, Susanna in Le nozze di Figaro and a role debut as Irina in Tri Sestri, all at the Vienna State Opera, and Adina in L'elisir d'amore at the Opéra de Lausanne and the Nationaltheater Mannheim.

Her debut album will be released on 10 January 2020.

Nafornița has sung a version of the popular Romanian folk song "Cântă cucu-n Bucovina" ("Sings the Cuckoo in Bukovina").

== Personal life ==
In 2021 Valentina divorced her husband, baritone Mihai Dogotari. She is the patron of CCF Moldova, an organization which helps children in need in her native Moldova.

== Recordings ==
- Romance, Münchner Runfunkorchster conducted by Keri-Lynn Wilson, Outhere Music, 2020
- Don Giovanni by Mozart, 2014 (DVD) singing the role of Zerlina. Salzburger Festspiele with the Vienna Philharmonic conducted by Christoph Eschenbach.
- Hans Zimmer: Filmmusik: The World Of Hans Zimmer, 2019 (CD), Sony Classical
