= Tommi Hakala =

Finnish opera singer (born 1970)

Tommi Hakala (born 9 August 1970) is a Finnish operatic baritone and winner of the 2003 BBC Singer of the World Competition in Cardiff. He was born in Riihimäki, Finland.

== Sources ==
- BBC News, "Finnish flourish for song contest", 30 June 2003
- BBC Singer of the World Competition, Biography: Tommi Hakala
