= Naumburg International Piano Competition =

The Naumburg International Piano Competition is the name given to all the piano competitions sponsored by the Walter W. Naumburg Foundation. It is a competition for young pianists, of ages 17 to 32, organized in New York City, United States since 1926. It is one of the oldest music competitions in the world; initially the winners received debut recitals in New York rather than any cash prize. The competition has helped to launch the career of pianists including Jorge Bolet, William Kapell, Abbey Simon, Theodore Lettvin, Constance Keene, Adele Marcus, Kun-Woo Paik, Andre-Michel Schub and Stephen Hough. It was described by The New York Times in 1991 as "in its quiet way, the most prestigious of them all."

The piano competition is dedicated to the ideals set out by Walter Naumburg, as are the other Foundation-sponsored competitions and awards in solo and chamber music performance, composer recordings, conducting and commissions. Naumburg believed that such competitions were not only for the benefit of new stars, but would encourage talented young artists to become prime movers in the development of the highest standards of musical excellence throughout the world. The solo competition disciplines rotate from year to year, encompassing piano, violin, cello and voice. The piano competition is currently held every five years.

The winner usually receives a cash prize, a string of performances, management, a recording contract, and New York City debuts in the city's most important classical music venues. In recent years, the Foundation office has undertaken to manage new winners for two seasons or until a commercial manager emerges to take them on.

== Winners ==
Complete list of first prize winners:

- 1926: Sonia Skalka, Margaret Hamilton
- 1927: Dorothy Kendrick, William Sauber
- 1928: Adele Marcus
- 1930: Ruth Culbertson
- 1932: Dalies Frantz, Huddie Johnson
- 1933: Catherine Carver
- 1935: Judith Sidorsky
- 1937: Jorge Bolet, Ida Krehm
- 1939: Zadel Skolovsky
- 1940: Abbey Simon, Thomas Richner
- 1941: William Kapell
- 1942: Annette Elkanova
- 1943: Constance Keene, Ruth Geiger
- 1944: Jeanne Therrien
- 1946: Leonid Hambro, Jeanne Rosenblum
- 1947: Abba Bogin, Jane Carlson
- 1948: Theodore Lettvin
- 1950: Margaret Barthel Baxtresser
- 1951: June Kovach
- 1954: William Doppmann, Jean Wentworth
- 1956: George Katz
- 1958: Joseph Schwartz
- 1959: Howard Aibel, Ralph Votapek
- 1971: Kun-Woo Paik, Zola Shaulis
- 1974: Andre-Michel Schub
- 1975: Dickran Atamian
- 1979: Peter Orth
- 1983: Stephen Hough
- 1987: Anton Nel
- 1992: Awadagin Pratt
- 1997: Steven Osborne, Anthony Molinaro
- 2002: Gilles Vonsattel
- 2010: Soyeon Lee
- 2017: Albert Cano Smit, Xiaohui Yang
