= The Carnival of the Animals =

1886 musical suite by Camille Saint-Saëns

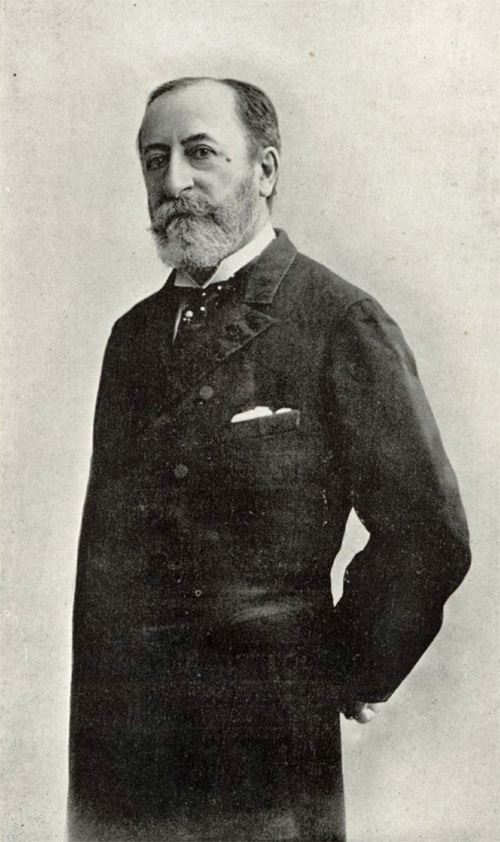
Saint-Saëns circa 1880

The Carnival of the Animals (French: Le Carnaval des animaux) is a humorous musical suite of 14 movements, including "The Swan", by the French composer Camille Saint-Saëns. About 25 minutes long, it was written for private performance by two pianos and chamber ensemble; Saint-Saëns prohibited public performance of the work during his lifetime, feeling that its frivolity would damage his standing as a serious composer. The suite was published in 1922, the year after his death. A public performance that year was greeted with enthusiasm, and it has remained among his most popular works. It is less frequently performed with a full orchestral complement of strings.

== History ==
After a disastrous concert tour of Germany in 1885–86, Saint-Saëns withdrew to a small Austrian village, where he composed The Carnival of the Animals in February 1886. From the beginning, he regarded the work as a piece of fun. On 9 February 1886 he wrote to his publishers Durand in Paris that he was composing a work for the coming Shrove Tuesday, and confessing that he knew he should be working on his Third Symphony, but that this work was "such fun" ("mais c'est si amusant!"). He had apparently intended to write the work for his students at the École Niedermeyer de Paris, but it was first performed at a private concert given by the cellist Charles Lebouc on 3 March 1886:

Monsieur Lebouc managed to assemble a definitive line-up of eminent performers: Messieurs Saint-Saëns, Diémer, Taffanel, Turban, Maurin, Prioré, de Bailly and Tourcy who, after a very interesting program, took part in the first performance of a very witty fantasy burlesque, composed for this concert by Saint-Saëns and entitled the Carnival of the Animals. This zoological fantasy was received with great enthusiasm.

A second performance was given at Émile Lemoine's chamber music society La Trompette, followed by another at the home of Pauline Viardot with an audience including Franz Liszt, a friend of the composer, who had expressed a wish to hear the work. There were other performances, typically for the French mid-Lent festival of Mi-Carême. All those performances were semi-private, except for one at the Société des instruments à vent in April 1892, and "often took place with the musicians wearing masks of the heads of the various animals they represented". Saint-Saëns was adamant that the work not be published in his lifetime, seeing it as detracting from his "serious" composer image. He relented only for the famous cello solo The Swan, the work's penultimate movement, which was published in 1887 in an arrangement by the composer for cello and solo piano (the original uses two pianos).

Despite being unpublished during his lifetime, Carnival of the Animals was given a British premiere on 2 September 1905 at the Promenade Concerts under the baton of Henry Wood, at Queen's Hall.

Saint-Saëns specified in his will that the work should be published posthumously. He died in December 1921, and Durand published it in Paris in April 1922; the first public performance was given on 25 February 1922 by the Concerts Colonne, conducted by Gabriel Pierné. It was rapturously received. Le Figaro reported:

We cannot describe the cries of admiring joy let loose by an enthusiastic public. In the immense oeuvre of Camille Saint-Saëns, The Carnival of the Animals is certainly one of his magnificent masterpieces. From the first note to the last, it is an uninterrupted outpouring of a spirit of the highest and noblest comedy. In every bar, at every point, there are unexpected and irresistible finds. Themes, whimsical ideas, and instrumentation compete with buffoonery, grace, and science. ... When he likes to joke, the master never forgets that he is the master.

Its first American performance was by the New York Symphony on 24 October 1922 at the President's Theater in Washington, DC. Walter Damrosch conducted, and later that month he led additional performances by the Symphony in Philadelphia (26 October) and New York (29 October).

The Carnival of the Animals has since become one of Saint-Saëns's best-known works, in the original version for 11 instruments, or more often with the full string section of an orchestra. Frequently, a glockenspiel substitutes for the rare glass harmonica.

== Music ==
The suite is scored for two pianos, two violins, viola, cello, double bass, flute (and piccolo), clarinet (C and B♭), glass harmonica,* and xylophone. There are 14 movements, each representing a different animal or animals:

*usually replaced by a glockenspiel or celesta.

=== I. Introduction et marche royale du lion (Introduction and Royal March of the Lion) ===
I. Introduction and Royal March of the Lion
Performed by Neal and Nancy O'Doan (piano) and the Seattle Youth Symphony under Vilem Sokol

Strings and two pianos: the introduction begins with the pianos playing a bold tremolo, under which the strings enter with a stately theme. The pianos play a pair of glissandos going in opposite directions to conclude the first part of the movement. The pianos then introduce a march theme that they carry through most of the rest of the introduction. The strings provide the melody, with the pianos occasionally taking low chromatic scales in octaves which suggest the roar of a lion, or high ostinatos. The two groups of instruments switch places, with the pianos playing a higher, softer version of the melody. The movement ends with a fortissimo note from all the instruments used in this movement.

=== II. Poules et coqs (Hens and Roosters) ===
II. Hens and Roosters

Violins, viola, two pianos and clarinet: this movement is centered around a "pecking" theme played by the pianos and strings, reminiscent of chickens pecking at grain. The clarinet plays a small solo above the strings; the piano plays a very fast theme based on the rooster's crowing cry.

=== III. Hémiones (animaux véloces) (Wild Donkeys (Swift Animals)) ===
III. Wild Asses

Two pianos: the image of the running animals is depicted by constant, feverishly fast up-and-down motion of both pianos playing figures an octave apart. The animals referenced in the title are dziggetai, donkeys that come from Tibet and are known for their great speed.

=== IV. Tortues (Tortoises) ===
IV. Tortoises

Strings and piano: a satirical movement which opens with a piano playing a pulsing triplet figure in the higher register. The strings play a slow rendition of the famous "Galop infernal" (commonly called the Can-can) from Offenbach's comic opera Orphée aux enfers (Orpheus in the Underworld).

=== V. L'Éléphant (The Elephant) ===
V. The Elephant

Double bass and piano: this section is marked Allegro pomposo, the great caricature for an elephant. The piano plays a waltz-like triplet figure while the bass hums the melody beneath it. Like "Tortues", this is also a musical joke—the thematic material is taken from the Scherzo from Mendelssohn's incidental music to A Midsummer Night's Dream and Berlioz's "Dance of the Sylphs" from The Damnation of Faust. The two themes were both originally written for high, lighter-toned instruments (flute and various other woodwinds, and violin, accordingly); the joke is that Saint-Saëns moves this to the lowest and heaviest-sounding instrument in the orchestra, the double bass.

=== VI. Kangourous (Kangaroos) ===
VI. Kangaroos

Two pianos: the main figure here is a pattern of "hopping" chords (made up of triads in various positions) preceded by grace notes in the right hand. When the chords ascend, they quickly get faster and louder, and when the chords descend, they quickly get slower and softer.

=== VII. Aquarium ===
VII. Aquarium

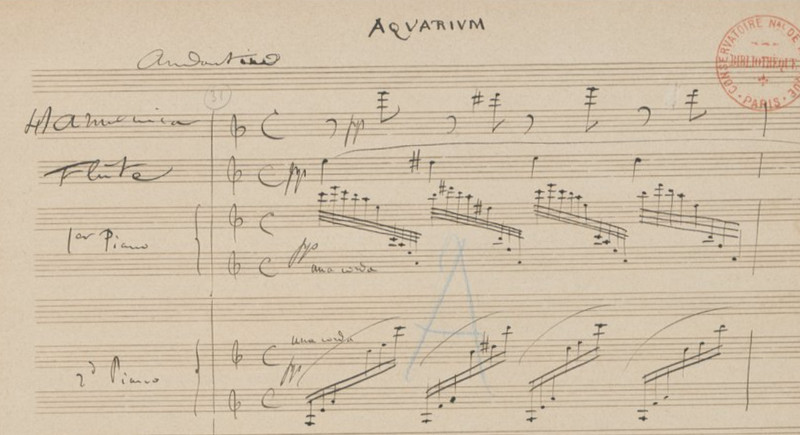
Part of the original manuscript score of "Aquarium". The top staff was written for the glass harmonica.

Violins, viola, cello (string quartet), two pianos, flute, and glass harmonica. The melody is played by the flute, backed by the strings, and glass harmonica on top of sparkling, glissando-like runs and arpeggios in pianos. These figures, plus the occasional glissando from the glass harmonica towards the end—often played on celesta or glockenspiel—are evocative of a peaceful, dimly lit aquarium.

=== VIII. Personnages à longues oreilles (Characters with Long Ears) ===
VIII. Characters with Long Ears

Two violins: this is the shortest movement. The violins alternate playing high, loud notes and low, buzzing ones (in the manner of a donkey's braying "hee-haw"). Critics have speculated that the movement is meant to compare music critics to braying donkeys.

=== IX. Le Coucou au fond des bois (The Cuckoo in the Depths of the Woods) ===
IX. The Cuckoo in the Depths of the Woods

Two pianos and clarinet: the pianos play large, soft chords while the clarinet plays a single two-note ostinato; a C and an A♭, mimicking the call of a cuckoo bird. Saint-Saëns writes in the score that the clarinettist should be offstage.

=== X. Volière (Aviary) ===
X. Aviary

Strings, pianos and flute: the high strings take on a background role, providing a buzz in the background reminiscent of the background noise in a jungle. The cellos and basses play a pickup cadence to lead into most of the measures. The flute takes the part of the bird, with a trilling tune that spans much of its range. The pianos provide occasional pings and trills of other birds in the background. The movement ends very quietly after a long ascending chromatic scale from the flute.

=== XI. Pianistes (Pianists) ===
XI. Pianists

Strings and two pianos: this humorous movement (satirizing pianists as animals) is a glimpse of what few audiences ever get to see: the pianists practicing their finger exercises and scales. The scales of C, D♭, D and E♭ are covered. Each starts with a trill on the first and second note, then proceeds in scales with a few changes in the rhythm. Transitions between keys are accomplished with a blasting chord from all the instruments between scales. In some performances, the later, more difficult, scales are deliberately played increasingly out of time. The original edition has an editor's note instructing the players to imitate beginners and their awkwardness. After the four scales, the key changes back to C, and the pianos play a moderate speed trill-like pattern in thirds, in the style of Charles-Louis Hanon or Carl Czerny, while the strings play a small part underneath. This movement is unusual in that the last three blasted chords do not resolve the piece, but rather lead into the next movement.

=== XII. Fossiles (Fossils) ===
XII. Fossils

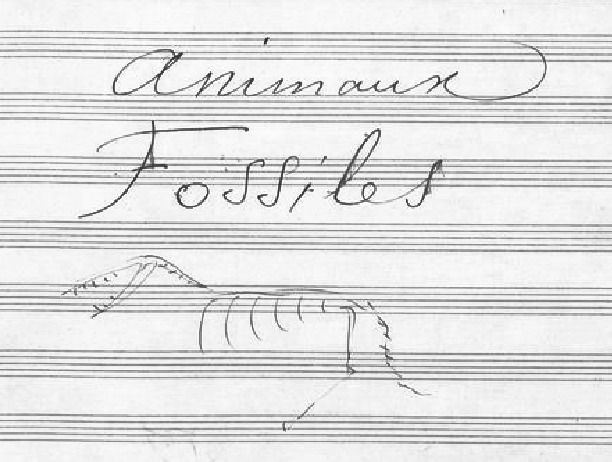
Title page to "Fossils" in the manuscript including drawing by the composer

Strings, two pianos, clarinet, and xylophone: here, Saint-Saëns mimics his Danse macabre, which makes heavy use of the xylophone to evoke skeletons dancing, the bones clacking together to the beat. The musical themes of Danse macabre are also quoted; the xylophone and strings play much of the melody, alternating with the piano and clarinet. Allusions to "Ah! vous dirai-je, maman" (better known in the English-speaking world as "Twinkle Twinkle Little Star"), the French nursery rhymes "Au clair de la lune", and "J'ai du bon tabac" (the second piano plays the same melody upside down [inversion]), the popular anthem "Partant pour la Syrie", and the aria "Una voce poco fa" from Rossini's The Barber of Seville can also be heard. The October 1922 program note for Walter Damrosch's performance with the New York Symphony—he had led the U.S. premiere days earlier—explained the title: "These are well-known tunes of which the composer himself had presumably grown tired." The musical joke in this movement, according to Leonard Bernstein's narration on his [1960s] recording of the work with the New York Philharmonic, is that the musical pieces quoted are the fossils of Saint-Saëns's time.

=== XIII. Le cygne (The Swan) ===
XIII. The Swan

Two pianos and cello: a slowly moving cello melody (which evokes a swan gliding over water) is played over rippling sixteenths in one piano and rolled chords in the other.

A staple of the cello repertoire, this is one of the suite's best-known movements, usually in the version for cello with solo piano. It was the only movement of the suite published in Saint-Saëns's lifetime.

A short ballet solo, The Dying Swan, was choreographed in 1905 by Mikhail Fokine to this movement and performed by Anna Pavlova, who gave some 4,000 performances of the dance and "swept the world".

=== XIV. Final (Finale) ===
XIV. Finale

Full ensemble: the finale opens on the same trills in the pianos as in the introduction, but soon the wind instruments, the glass harmonica and the xylophone join in. The strings build the tension with a few low notes, leading to glissandi by the piano before the lively main melody is introduced. The Finale is somewhat reminiscent of an American carnival of the 19th century, with one piano always maintaining a bouncy eighth-note rhythm. Although the melody is relatively simple, the supporting harmonies are ornamented in the style typical of Saint-Saëns' piano works—dazzling scales, glissandi, and trills. Many of the previous movements are quoted. The work ends with a series of six "Hee Haws" from the donkeys, as if to say that the donkey has the last laugh, before the final strong group of C major chords.

== Musical allusions ==
As the title suggests, the work is programmatical and zoological. It progresses from the first movement, Introduction et marche royale du lion, through portraits of elephants and donkeys ("Personages with Long Ears") to a finale reprising many of the earlier motifs.

Several of the movements are of humorous intent:

- Poules et coqs uses the theme of Rameau's harpsichord piece La poule ("The Hen") from his Suite in G major, but in a less elegant mood.
- Tortues makes use of the well-known "Galop infernal" from Offenbach's comic opera Orpheus in the Underworld, playing the usually breakneck-speed melody at a slow, drooping pace.
- L'éléphant uses a theme from Berlioz's "Danse des sylphes" (from his work The Damnation of Faust) played in a much lower register than usual as a double bass solo. The piece also quotes the Scherzo from Mendelssohn's A Midsummer Night's Dream.
- The Personnages à longues oreilles section is thought to be directed at music critics: they are also supposedly the last animals heard during the finale, braying.
- Pianistes depicts piano students labouring over their scales in Hanon- and Czerny-style exercises.
- Fossiles quotes Saint-Saëns's own Danse macabre as well as three nursery rhymes, "J'ai du bon tabac", "Ah! vous dirai-je, Maman" (Twinkle Twinkle Little Star) and "Au clair de la lune", also the song "Partant pour la Syrie" and Rossini's aria, "Una voce poco fa" from The Barber of Seville.

== Verses ==
In 1949 Ogden Nash wrote a set of humorous verses to accompany each movement for a Columbia Masterworks recording of Carnival of the Animals conducted by Andre Kostelanetz. They were recited by Noël Coward; Kostelanetz and Coward performed the suite with Nash's verses with the New York Philharmonic at Carnegie Hall, New York, in 1956.

Nash's verses, with their topical references (e.g. to President Truman's piano playing) became dated, and later writers have written new words to accompany the suite, including Johnny Morris, Jeremy Nicholas, Jack Prelutsky, and John Lithgow, A version by Sheku and Isata Kanneh-Mason, with Michael Morpurgo narrating, was released in 2020.

== Recordings ==
Various recordings of the Carnival of the Animals have been created. Some notable ones are:

Year	Orchestra	Pianists	Conductor	Narrator	Ref.
1929	Philadelphia Orchestra	Olga Barabini, Mary Binney Montgomery	Leopold Stokowski	—	
1949	Kostelanetz Orchestra	Leonid Hambro, Jascha Zayde	André Kostelanetz	Noël Coward	
1955	Philharmonia Orchestra	Béla Síki, Géza Anda	Igor Markevitch	—	
1960	London Symphony Orchestra	Julius Katchen, Gary Graffman	Skitch Henderson	Beatrice Lillie	
1961	Boston Pops Orchestra	Leo Litwin, Samuel Lipman	Arthur Fiedler	Hugh Downs	
1962	New York Philharmonic	Ruth Segal, Naomi Segal	Leonard Bernstein	Leonard Bernstein	
1967	Paris Conservatoire Orchestra	Aldo Ciccolini, Alexis Weissenberg	Georges Prêtre	—	
1968	Philadelphia Orchestra	Claude Frank, Lilian Kallir	Eugene Ormandy	—	
1971	City of Birmingham Symphony Orchestra	John Ogdon, Brenda Lucas	Louis Frémaux	—	
1975	Vienna Philharmonic Orchestra (Note: Originally released (1975) with Nash's verses recited by Hermione Gingold. Subsequently reissued without narration.)	Aloys and Alfons Kontarsky	Karl Böhm	—	
1978	Instrumental ensemble (Note: Maurice André, Jacques Cazauran, Guy-Joel Cipriani, Michel Debost, Claude Desurmont, Alain Moglia, Gerard Perotin, Trio à cordes français)	Michel Béroff, Jean-Philippe Collard	—	—	
1978	Instrumental ensemble (Note: Alain Marion, flute; Michel Arrignon, clarinet; Michel Cals, glockenspiel; Michel Cerutti, xylophone; Régis Pasquier, violin I; Yan Pascal Tortelier, violin II; Gérard Caussé, viola; Yo-Yo Ma, cello; Gabin Lauridon, double bass.)	Philippe Entremont, Gaby Casadesus	Philippe Entremont	—	
1980	London Sinfonietta	Pascal Rogé, Cristina Ortiz	Charles Dutoit	—	
1981	Pittsburgh Symphony Orchestra	Joseph Villa, Patricia Prattis Jennings	André Previn	—	
1983	Israel Philharmonic Orchestra	Katia and Marielle Labèque	Zubin Mehta	Itzhak Perlman (Note: Also released without narration.)	
1985	Instrumental ensemble (Note: Irena Grafenauer, flute; Eduard Brunner, clarinet; Gidon Kremer, violin; Isabelle van Keulen, violin; Tabea Zimmermann, viola; Mischa Maisky, cello; Georg Hortnagel, double bass; Markus Steckeler, xylophone; Edith Salmen-Weber, glockenspiel)	Martha Argerich, Nelson Freire	—	—	
1988	Nash Ensemble	Nash Ensemble pianists (unnamed)	—	—	
1988	Instrumental ensemble (Note: Rebecca Hirsch, Beatrice Harper, violins; Terry Nettle, viola; Jonathan Williams, cello; Rodney Slatford, double bass; Nicholas Vallis-Davies, flute/piccolo; Angela Malsbury, clarinet; Annie Oakley, xylophone; James Strebing, glockenspiel.)	David Nettle, Richard Markham	—	Jeremy Nicholas	
1989	Instrumental ensemble (Note: Paul Edmund-Davies (flute), Andrew Marriner (clarinet), Alexander Barantschik and Ashley Arbuckle (violins), Alexander Taylor (viola), Ray Adams (cello), Paul Marrion (double-bass), Ray Northcott (percussion))	Julian Jacobson, Nigel Hutchinson	Barry Wordsworth	—	
1989	Philharmonia Orchestra	Nicholas Walker, Laura O'Gorman	Philip Ellis	—	
1989	Academy of London	Anton Nel, Keith Snell	Richard Stamp	—	
1990	Czecho-Slovak RSO (Note: This recording features virtuoso harmonica player Tommy Reilly playing on a mouth organ instead of a glass harmonica. This mistake was noted and acknowledged by music journalist Fritz Spiegl in a 1984 dictionary of musical ephemera.)	Marian Lapšanský, Peter Toperczer	Ondrej Lenárd	Johnny Morris (Note: Also released without narration)	
1993	I Musici de Montreal	David Owen Norris, Gregory Shaverdian	Yuli Turovsky	—	
1994	St Petersburg Radio and Television Symphony Orchestra	uncredited	Stanislav Gorkovenko	—	
1994	Boston Symphony	Garrick Ohlsson, John Browning	Seiji Ozawa	—	
1999	Munich Chamber Orchestra (Note: German narration spoken by Peter Ustinov)	Anthony and Joseph Paratore	Karl Anton Rickenbacher	—	
2003	Instrumental ensemble (Note: Renaud Capuçon, Gautier Capuçon, David Guerrier, Esther Hoppe, Florent Jodelet, Marie-Pierre Langlamet, Paul Meyer, Béatrice Muthelet, Emmanuel Pahud and Janne Saksala)	Frank Braley, Michel Dalberto	—	—	
2005	London Symphony Orchestra	uncredited	Barry Wordsworth	—	
2013	Cincinnati Pops Orchestra	none (Note: This recording is in a reorchestrated version)	John Morris Russell	—	
2015	Bergen Philharmonic Orchestra	Louis Lortie, Hélène Mercier-Arnault	Neeme Järvi	—	
2016	Royal Concertgebouw Orchestra	Lucas and Arthur Jussen	Stéphane Denève	—	
2016	Santa Cecilia Orchestra	Martha Argerich, Antonio Pappano	Antonio Pappano	—	
2017	Royal Liverpool Philharmonic Orchestra	Richard Casey, Ian Buckle	Vasily Petrenko	Alexander Armstrong	
2019	Utah Symphony	Jason Hardink, Kimi Kawashima	Thierry Fischer	—	
2020	The Kanneh-Masons	Isata Kanneh-Mason, Konya Kaneh-Mason, Jeneba Kaneh-Mason	—	Olivia Colman	

=== Alternative recordings ===
- "Aquarium" was used as the musical background for the opening credits of Terrence Malick's 1978 film Days of Heaven.
- In 1982, the Philip Jones Brass Ensemble recorded an arrangement for brass instruments by Peter Reeve.
- A parody of the work entitled "Carnival of the Animals, Part Two" was recorded by "Weird Al" Yankovic and Wendy Carlos in 1988, with new verses written by Yankovic about a different cast of animals such as the shark and the poodle.
- In 1993, an all-star cast recording was released on CD by Dove Audio performed by the Hollywood Chamber Orchestra conducted by Lalo Schifrin with all proceeds going to charity. Readers included Arte Johnson (Introduction and Finale), Charlton Heston (Royal March of The Lion), James Earl Jones (Hens and Roosters), Betty White (Wild Donkeys), Lynn Redgrave (Tortoises), William Shatner (The Elephant), Joan Rivers (Kangaroos), Ted Danson (Aquarium), Lily Tomlin (Characters with Long Ears), Deborah Raffin (The Cuckoo), Audrey Hepburn (Aviary), Dudley Moore (Pianists), Walter Matthau (Fossils) and Jaclyn Smith (The Swan).
- In 1996, a surf rock cover of "Aquarium" was used as the on-ride soundtrack of the original Space Mountain ride layout at Disneyland before its 2005 renovation. It featured guitar riffs by Dick Dale.
- The finale for the suite was used as music for one of the segments in the 1999 Disney film, Fantasia 2000, performed by the Chicago Symphony Orchestra. In it, a slapstick flamingo plays with a yo-yo, much to the chagrin of the other flamingoes, who attempt to entice him into doing the same "dull" routine as them. Gail Niwa and Philip Sabransky are the featured pianists in this recording. James Earl Jones introduces the segment, as he is standing next to animator Eric Goldberg, who directed the segment. Jones discusses the "drawing boards [which] have been the birthplace of some of the most beloved animal characters of all time" and how the animation and music combine to answer "that age old question" about the relationship between man and nature. Then, in a comical turn, he is handed a piece of paper and reads "that age old question: What would happen if you gave a yo-yo to a flock of flamingoes?" before asking "Who wrote this?"
- For a ballet to Saint-Saëns's suite, choreographed by Christopher Wheeldon and presented by New York City Ballet, John Lithgow wrote a narration. The storyline is that a mischievous boy slips away from his teacher during a trip to a museum of natural history and, once the museum is shut, sees all the people he knows transformed into animals. An audio recording was made in 2004 by members of Chamber Music Los Angeles, conducted by Bill Elliot, with the narration spoken by Lithgow.
- In 2021, the Los Angeles Philharmonic streamed the piece at the Hollywood Bowl with Yuja Wang and David Fung on piano, conducted by Gustavo Dudamel. Four animal folktales were narrated by El Sistema students from around the world - Martin (9), Arão (12), Afra (14), and Maya (8).
- In 2016, The Wiggles released The Carnival of the Animals, with narration written and performed by Simon Pryce and the music performed by the Adelaide Symphony Orchestra.

== Notes and references ==
=== Sources ===
- Blakeman, Edward (2005). Taffanel: Genius of the Flute. Oxford: Oxford University Press. ISBN 978-0-19-517098-6.
- Coward, Noël (1982). Payn, Graham; Morley, Sheridan (eds.). The Noël Coward Diaries (1941–1969). London: Methuen. ISBN 978-0-297-78142-4.
- Griffiths, Paul (2004). The Penguin Companion to Classical Music. London and New York: Penguin. ISBN 978-0-14-100924-7.
- Ratner, Sabina Teller (2002). Camille Saint-Saëns, 1835–1921: A Thematic Catalogue of his Complete Works, Volume I: The Instrumental Works. Oxford: Oxford University Press. ISBN 978-0-19-816320-6.
- Saint-Saëns, Camille (1957) [1922]. Le Carnaval des animaux: grande fantaisie zoologique. Paris: Durand. OCLC 31227464.
- Stegemann, Michael (1991). Camille Saint-Saëns and the French solo concerto from 1850 to 1920. Lanham: Amadeus Press. ISBN 978-0-93-134035-2..
