= WIAB =

Coordinates: 45.5681°N 85.0742°W

- Mackinaw City, Michigan; United States
- Broadcast area: Mackinaw City-St. Ignace
- Frequency: 88.5 MHz
- Branding: Classical IPR

Programming
- Format: Public radio; Classical
- Affiliations: NPR

Ownership
- Owner: Interlochen Center for the Arts

History
- First air date: October 1, 2000
- Former call signs: WDQV (2000–2005)
- Call sign meaning: Interlochen Arts Academy (similar to WIAA)

Technical information
- Licensing authority: FCC
- Class: C1
- ERP: 50,000 watts
- HAAT: 239 meters (784 ft)

Links
- Public license information: Public file; LMS
- Webcast: Available on website
- Website: Classical IPR Online

WIAB (88.5 FM) is a radio station in Mackinaw City, Michigan. The station is owned by Interlochen Center for the Arts, and is an affiliate of the Interlochen Public Radio's "Classical IPR" network, consisting of classical music.

== History ==
The original call sign for 88.5 FM's construction permit was WAAQ, but the station was never on the air with those calls. It signed on as WDQV, "88-Dot-5 Dove FM," airing a satellite-fed contemporary Christian music format from Salem Communications ("Today's Christian Music"). Interlochen purchased WDQV in March 2005, and after a brief period of silence, 88.5 FM became WIAB, simulcasting WIAA, in July.

WIAB was formerly simulcast on a translator in Mackinaw City, W237CF (95.3 FM), which was formerly owned by Xavier University and then Cincinnati Classical Public Radio as a translator of WVXU 96.7 FM (now WRGZ) in Rogers City, Michigan. W237CF, now on 95.1 FM as W236BZ in St. Ignace, is now owned by Baraga Broadcasting and simulcasts Catholic radio station WTCK in Charlevoix.

== Sources ==
- Michiguide.com – WIAB History
