= Paula Robison =

American flute soloist (born 1941)

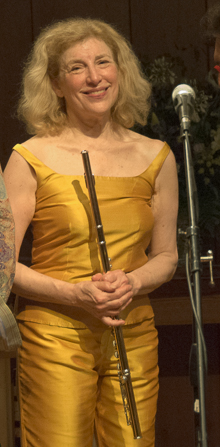
- Paula Robison at Tannery Pond Concerts, June 20, 2010

Background information
- Born: June 8, 1941 (age 85); Nashville, Tennessee, U.S.
- Occupations: Soloist, teacher
- Instrument: Flute

Paula Robison (born June 8, 1941) is a flute soloist and teacher.

== Early life and education ==
Paula Robison was born in Nashville, Tennessee, the daughter of David V. and Naomi Robison, an actor. David Robison was a playwright and writer for film and television. Her paternal grandmother was a piano teacher, her maternal uncle the playwright Jerome Lawrence, and there were other musicians and dancers in the family. David studied in Vienna, and upon his return joined the faculty of Fisk University. There the family met the singer Paul Robeson, who became Paula's godfather.

The family moved to Hollywood, where Naomi continued her acting career and David took up screenwriting. Paula's sister Deborah and brother Joshua were born there. Paula learned to play the flute in the orchestra of North Hollywood Junior High School, continuing her studies with Arthur Hoberman. She studied piano with her grandmother. At the age of ten she first met the composer Leon Kirchner, with whom she collaborated as an adult.

During the McCarthy era the Robisons were charged and questioned by a committee in a televised hearing. With both parents on the Hollywood blacklist and out of work, the family was suddenly without financial resources. They were compelled to move to New York State to live on her grandmother's farm. After several years, the family returned to Studio City, California and David Robison started writing under a pen name and found success in television, writing for Lassie, Bewitched, and The Andy Griffith Show. When the blacklist came to an end, he resumed writing under his own name. His play, Promenade, All, with a star cast which included Hume Cronyn, Eli Wallach and Ann Jackson, played on Broadway in 1972. David and Naomi moved to Woodstock NY in the mid sixties, where David died from lung cancer in 1977.

Paula Robison attended the University of Southern California for two years, studying flute with Roger Stevens, Principal Flutist of the LA Philharmonic, theater with Jeff Corey, and dance with Bella Lewitzky.

She eventually played for Julius Baker, which led to an audition for the Juilliard School. She was admitted and graduated with a BS in 1963. In 1961 she also began to study during the summers with Marcel Moyse at the Marlboro Music School and Festival (making her the direct musical descendant of Paul Taffanel). Her studies with Moyse continued until 1968.

== Early career ==
Robison joined the roster of Young Concert Artists in their inaugural year, 1961. The same year, she played Volière in Saint-Saëns' Carnival of the Animals with Leonard Bernstein and the New York Philharmonic.

In 1966 she became the first American to win First Prize at the Geneva International Music Competition. After this her concert tours became increasingly frequent, as she played with orchestras and gave recitals, many of them with the pianist and chamber musician Samuel Sanders.

== Career ==
When the Chamber Music Society of Lincoln Center was established in the autumn of 1969, Robison was one of the founding members. She played in the first concerts in the recently opened Alice Tully Hall. She had her own recital series at the hall for 5 years, called "Paula and..."

She also continued to play often at Carnegie Hall, long after her debut as Volière, in programs as diverse as J. S. Bach with Alexander Schneider in his Christmas and New Year's Eve Midnight Concerts, Mozart with the Leipzig Gewandhaus Orchestra, François Borne's Fantaisie brillante sur Carmen with Skitch Henderson and the New York Pops, the New York Premiere of Leon Kirchner's Music for Flute and Orchestra with Michael Tilson Thomas and the American Symphony Orchestra, Takemitsu's I Hear the Water Dreaming with John Nelson and the Indianapolis Symphony Orchestra, as well as a program of Choro and Bossa Nova with a group of Brazilian and American musicians.

On July 23, 1971, she premièred the first of Leon Kirchner's compositions commissioned for her, Flutings for Paula, in Sanders Theater at Harvard University. On September 21, 2006 she premiered the expanded version of the score with The Chamber Music Society of Lincoln Center at Alice Tully Hall, together with percussionist Ayano Kataoka.

Ms. Robison gave concerts at the Metropolitan Museum of Art every season for over 30 years, at the Grace Rainey Rogers Auditorium as well as in the Medieval Sculpture Court and in the Temple of Dendur with Chamber Orchestra.

Her touring continued, with frequent concerts at the Kennedy Center in Washington DC. She performed internationally with the Budapest Strings. She continued as a participant at the Marlboro Festival, playing with Rudolf Serkin, Mieczysław Horszowski, and others. She has also collaborated with pianists Jean-Yves Thibaudet and Yefim Bronfman, harpsichordists Kenneth Cooper and John Gibbons, as well as the guitarist Frederic Hand.

In 1971, she began to play at the Spoleto Festival. In 1977 she and Scott Nickrenz were appointed co-directors of the Noontime Concerts, and they continued in that capacity until 2003, both in Italy and in Charleston, SC. As a result, Robison was awarded the Premio Pegaso and the Adelaide Ristori prizes for her contribution to Italian cultural life. Together with the harpist Heidi Lehwalder, they toured as members of the Orpheus Trio from 1971 to 1983. Beginning in 1978 until 1990, she toured with the guitarist Eliot Fisk and with the pianist Ruth Laredo. In the late 1970s she was playing at least 100 concerts in a year. She toured Japan in 1978, performing Takemitsu's I Hear the Water Dreaming there not long after its premiere in the US.

Most of the flute music of the eccentric American polymath, Sidney Lanier (1841-1881), was lying inaccessible among his papers in the Johns Hopkins University Library until 1989, when Cynthia H. Requardt, Curator of Special Collections, approached Ms. Robison and Patricia Harper to make an edition of the scores, which was published in 1997 by Universal Editions. She has kept some of these works, above all "Wind Song", in her repertory ever since.

Ms. Robison joined the New England Conservatory faculty in 1973, and also taught at the Juilliard School during the early 1980s. She now occupies the Donna Hieken Flute Chair at the New England Conservatory.

In the early 1990s the composer Stanley Silverman, had come into possession of some musical scores written by Brazilian musicians for the Walt Disney cartoon, Saludos Amigos. He encouraged Robison to play one of these pieces as an encore at one of her 92nd Street Y concerts, a dance for flute and pandeiro, a large tambourine traditional in Brazil. Silverman invited the percussionist Cyro Baptista to join her. The flutist Irna Priore, who was at the concert, told her that in Brazil there was a repertory for flute in the choro, a tradition of popular song originating in 19th century Rio de Janeiro. Cyro Baptista's wife provided recordings and tapes of music that was largely unknown in the US. Robison began to work on it with Baptista and other Brazilian musicians, who toured with her and eventually they produced a recording, Brasileirinho. In the end the group became a trio: Cyro Baptista, Romero Lubambo and Ms. Robison. As she has said, "The fusion between the three of us, with Romero's elegant Bossa nova style and Cyro's mad world music percussion genius, created a whole new, very exciting sound. I called it 'Mistura Nova'!" The trio played together for over ten years. She also played with flutist Altamiro Carrilho and his ensemble in Rio de Janeiro.

Around this time, she took up a series of continuing projects called "With Art". These consist of collaborations with visual artists in unusual spaces. In the fall of 2005, Ms. Robison, as Artist-in-Residence at Boston's Isabella Stewart Gardner Museum, initiated "Variations on a Theme", together with conceptual artist Sol LeWitt and Pieranna Cavalchini, Curator of Contemporary Art at the museum, incorporating the music of Mozart.

In 2007 she made a new English performing version of the texts Schoenberg set in his Pierrot Lunaire — a work dear to her since she had played the flute part with Felix Galimir at Marlboro. In this she used both the original Albert Giraud poems and Otto Erich Hartleben's translations. She herself undertook the speaking part for two performances at Bargemusic in New York City. On December 31, 2009, in celebration of the full moon, the New Year, and a lunar project by Gardner Museum Artist-in-Residence Taro Shinoda, she performed as Sprecherin in a special midnight performance. She has since performed Schoenberg's work in many other venues. In November–December 2012 she joined Argento New Music Project for a two-week celebration of the 100th Anniversary of Pierrot Lunaire at the Austrian Cultural Forum New York.

Robison's recordings for Vanguard Classics Vanguard Classics were reissued, including The complete JS Bach and GF Handel sonatas for flute and harpsichord with Kenneth Cooper and "The Art of Paula Robison". She has also recorded for Sony, Mode (the complete Berio Sequenzas, awarded the Premio del Disco Amadeus 2008, and Lei Liang's "In Praise of Shadows"), New World Records, King Records, MHS, MusicMasters, and Bridge Recordings (her Marlboro Festival performance of Schubert's Introduction and Variations with Rudolf Serkin. In 2006 Robison founded Pergola Recordings. Critically acclaimed releases have included collaborations with pianists Jean-Yves Thibaudet, Yefim Bronfman, Timothy Hester, and Samuel Sanders, harpsichordists John Gibbons and Kenneth Cooper, violinists Krista Bennion Feeney and Calvin Wiersma, bassist John Feeney, percussionists Cyro Baptista and Ayano Kataoka, and guitarists Romero Lubambo, Eliot Fisk, and the late Sergio Brandao.

In 2011 she played Taffanel's Fantasy on Themes from Weber's Der Freischütz and in 2012 Boulez's Sonatine pour Flûte et Piano with Pianist Paavali Jumppanen. During 2015, Robison gave four performances with pianist Bruce Brubaker of Morton Feldman's more than four-hour-long work, "For Christian Wolff."

== Personal life ==
She has been married to Scott Nickrenz, most recently Abrams Curator of Music Emeritus of the Isabella Stewart Gardner Museum, since 1971.

== Discography ==
Discography Pergola Recordings

- PR1041 - Classic (Paula Robison, flute; Timothy Hester, piano)
- PR1040 - Caprice (Paula Robison, flute; Paavali Jumppanen, piano)
- PR1039 - Playing New York (Paula Robison, flute; Steven Beck, piano)
- PR1038 - Paula Live! Music of Frazelle, Liebermann, Kirchner, and Prokofiev (Paula Robison, flute; Timothy Hester, piano; Jean-Yves Thibaudet, piano; Ayano Kataoka, percussion; Yefim Bronfman, piano)
- PR1037 - Rio Days, Rio Nights (Paula Robison, flute; Romero Lubambo, guitar; Sergio Brandao, bass and cavaquinho; Cyro Baptista, percussion)
- PR1036 - Paula Robison, John Gibbons: J.S. Bach Sonatas BWV 525-530 (Paula Robison, flute; John Gibbons, harpsichord)
- PR1035 - Paula Robison: Edvard Grieg, Joachim Andersen: Music for Flute and Piano (Paula Robison, flute; Samuel Sanders, piano)
- PR1034 - By The Old Pine Tree: Music by Stephen Foster and Sidney Lanier (Paula Robison, flute; Krista Bennion Feeney and Calvin Wiersma, violins; John Feeney, bass; Samuel Sanders, piano)
- PR1033 - Mozart in Love: Music by Wolfgang Amadeus Mozart (Paula Robison, flute; Charleston Symphony Orchestra; Bundit Ungrangsee, conductor)
- PR1032 - One Hundred Roses: Seven Italian Serenades and Dances, with music by Godard, Chaminade, Griffes and Massenet. (Paula Robison, flute; Charleston Symphony Orchestra; David Stahl, conductor)

Vanguard Classics

- MC 123 - The Art of Paula Robison – A collection of all-time favorites from the Vanguard Archives (Paula Robison, flute and various artists)
- ATM CD 1271 - Mozart Flute Quartets: Complete (Paula Robison, flute; Tokyo String Quartet)
- ATM CD 1615 - Carmen Fantasy: Bizet-Borne, Fauré, Delibes, Massenet, Taffanel, Dutilleux, Gaubert (Paula Robison, flute; Samuel Sanders, piano)
- ATM CD 1616 - Paula Robison – The Romantic Flute (Paula Robison, flute; Samuel Sanders, piano)
- ATM CD 1493 - Bach Flute Sonatas, Flute Partita (Paula Robison, flute; Kenneth Cooper, harpsichord; Timothy Eddy, cello)
- ATM CD 1494 - Handel Flute Sonatas: Complete (Paula Robison, flute; Kenneth Cooper, harpsichord; Timothy Eddy, cello)
- ATM CD 1837 - Brasileirinho: Choros, Chorinhos, Bossas and Bach (Paula Robison, flute; Romero Lubambo, guitar; Tiberio Nascimento, guitar; Sergio Brandao, Cavaquinho; Stanley Silverman, guitar and mandolin; Cyro Baptista, percussion)
- ATM CD 1860 - Ravel – Fauré – Debussy: Works for Flute Viola and Harp (Paula Robison, flute; Scott Nickrenz, viola; Heidi Lehwalder, harp)

Mode

- MODE210 - Lei Liang – Brush Stroke: World Premiere recording of Lei Liang's "In Praise of Shadows"
- MODE161/3 - Berio Sequenzas complete and solo works

Bridge Records

- BRIDGE: 903 - Duos from Malboro: A collection of performances from the Marlboro Music Festival including the 1968 recording of Schubert's Introduction and Variations with Rudolf Serkin, piano

Pucker Gallery, Boston

- ISBN 1-879985-11-X - Places of the Spirit: Music and Images Inspired by the Berkshires. CD and catalogue collaboration. Music by Takemitsu, Schickele, Kirchner, Vivaldi, Warshauer, Debussy and Traditional music. (Paula Robison, flute; Cyro Baptista, percussion; paintings by Jim Schantz)
- ISBN 1-879985-19-5 Places of the Spirit: The Holy Land. A trip to Jerusalem with painter Jim Schantz, a book of images and a CD of music inspired by the journey. (Paula Robison, flute; Frederic Hand, guitar; Steven Beck, piano; Nancy Allen, harp)
- "Places of the Spirit: Music for Peace and Healing", a 2 disc compilation from the original Pucker Gallery releases.

King Records

- CD: KICC67 - Hungarian Pastoral Fantasy (Paula Robison, flute; Tokyo Akademiker Ensemble; Fumiki Asazuma, conductor)

New World Records

- 80403-2 - Flutes: Beaser, Song of the Bells (Paula Robison, flute; Solisti New York Chamber Orchestra; Alasdair Neale, conductor), The Old Men Admiring Themselves in the Water (Robert Beaser, piano) and other performances

CBS Masterworks

- CD: MLS 45523 - Flute, Greatest Hits: Greensleeves, Fauré Sicilienne, Genin Carnival of Venice, and other performances (Paula Robison, flute; Tokyo Akademiker Ensemble)

SONY Classical

- CD: SMK 46250 - Marlboro Festival, 40th Anniversary: Nielsen Woodwind Quartet (Paula Robison, flute; Joseph Turner, oboe; Larry Combs, clarinet; William Winstead, bassoon; Richard Solis, horn)

Marlboro Recording Society

- LP: MRS 3 - Schubert: Introduction and Variations on "Trockne Blumen" (Paula Robison, flute; Rudolf Serkin, piano)

Musical Heritage Society

- CASS: 6299 - Chamber Music Society of Lincoln Center Presents Schubert and Schumann: Schubert Variations for Flute and Piano (Paula Robison, flute; Richard Goode, piano) and other live performances
- 5169151 - Canciones Latinas (Paula Robison, flute; Eliot Fisk, guitar)
- 5169160 - French Masterpieces for Flute and Piano: Works by Fauré, Boulanger, Ravel, and Poulenc (Paula Robison, flute; Ruth Laredo, piano)
- 5184518 - Paula Robison Plays American Masterworks: Works by Copland, Barber, Roy Harris, and Robert Beaser (Paula Robison, flute; Timothy Hester, piano)
- 7038 - Mountain Songs: Works by Beaser, MacDowell, Richards, Foster, Corea, Schuman, and Ives (Paula Robison, flute; Eliot Fisk, guitar)
- MMD0152Y/53W - Spoleto Festival USA: Chamber Music at the Dock Street Theatre
- MMD0040/41 - Poulenc: Complete Music for Wind Instruments and Piano The Chamber Music Society of Lincoln Center
- MMD0093Z - J.S. Bach – A Musical Celebration: The Chamber Music Society of Lincoln Center
- MHS4523 - G. Philipp Telemann: Six "Konzerte" for Flute and Concertante Harpsichord (Paula Robison, flute; Anthony Newman, harpsichord)
- MHS3704/5 - G. Philipp Telemann: Twelve "Methodical" Sonatas for Flute and Continuo (Paula Robison, flute; Samuel Sanders, harpsichord; Laurence Lesser, cello)

Columbia Masterworks

- ML5768 - Saint Saëns: The Carnival of the Animals (Paula Robison, flute; New York Philharmonic; Leonard Bernstein, conductor and narrator)
- M39006 - Paula Robison: Romantic Favorites

Connoisseur Society

- CS362(5751) - Flute Concertos of 18th Century Paris: Concertos for 5 flutes (Paula Robison, Samuel Baron, Harold Bennett, Lois Schaefer, and Jean-Pierre Rampal, flutes)

CRI

- CRI SD 439 - William Schuman: In Sweet Music (Paula Robison, flute; Scott Nickrenz, viola; Heidi Lehwalder, harp; Rosalind Rees, soprano)

== Publications ==
Publications

- A Touch of Blue
- Sparklers for piccolo and piano

Theodore Presser (2017) First prize winner for newly published music at the National Flute Association.

- Amazing Grace: 8 Songs of the Spirit

Theodore Presser Company (2011)

- To a Wild Rose: 15 Romantic Pieces for Flute and Piano

Transcribed by Paula Robison G. Schirmer, Inc., New York (2003)

- Paula Robison Masterclass: Frank Martin – Ballade (2002)
- The Sidney Lanier Collection: Music for Solo Flute & Flute with Piano

Universal Edition, Vienna (1997)

- Paula Robison Flute Masterclass: Music of Paul Hindemith

New Edition, Schott Music Corporation, Mainz (2012)

- The Andersen Collection: Music by Joachim Andersen

Edited by Paula Robison and Irna Priore European American Music Corporation (1994)

- The Paula Robison Flute Warmups Book

European American Music Corporation (1989)

- Water Music

University of Michigan Press (2003)

- La Serenata for flute and guitar

"La Serenata": Favorite Italian serenades and love songs arranged for flute and guitar by Paula Robison and Frederic Hand Theodore Presser

As Contributor

- Ann McCutchan, Marcel Moyse: Voice of the Flute - The Foreword
- Marjorie Ryerson, Water Music - "A Dialogue"
- Ed. John Sinclair, Flute Stories - a story
- Amy Nathan, The Young Musician's Survival Guide - an interview
- Karen Evans Moratz, Flute for Dummies - an interview
- Stephanie Stein Crease, Music Lessons - an interview
- Maro Chermayeff and Amy Schewel, Juilliard - filmed interviews (book and PBS film)

== See also ==
- New England Conservatory
- Isabella Stewart Gardner Museum
- Chamber Music Society of Lincoln Center
- Marlboro Music School and Festival
