= Elizabeth Koch =

American oboist (born 1986)

Elizabeth Koch Tiscione (born 1986) is an oboist and principal oboe of the Atlanta Symphony Orchestra. She joined the ASO in the fall of 2007, and was granted tenure January 2009. She is a native of Buffalo, New York. Her teachers were Richard Woodhams and Daniel Stolper. She was a student at the Curtis Institute of Music and the Interlochen Arts Academy.

She is notable in that she was appointed principal oboe of a major symphony orchestra at the young age of 21. She shares this feat with Elaine Douvas who was also appointed principal oboe of the Atlanta Symphony Orchestra at 21.

She has also been guest principal with the Chicago Symphony Orchestra, playing the oboe solo in the Piano Concerto No. 1 (Tchaikovsky), with Andrew Davis and Evgeny Kissin (pianist). She has played at the Grand Teton Music Festival as a member of a woodwind quintet, which has included Robert S. Williams on bassoon and Larry Combs on clarinet.
