= Jane Carlson =

American pianist (1918–1998)

- Born: November 19, 1918
- Died: February 8, 1998 (aged 79)

Jane Elizabeth Carlson (November 19, 1918 – February 8, 1998) was a professor of piano at the Juilliard School. She won the 1947 Naumburg International Piano Competition.

== Education ==
Carlson was born in Hartford, Connecticut. Her interest in music began at a young age, and she started piano lessons when she was eight years old. Carlson received a regional scholarship to attend Shenandoah Conservatory of Music, and received her Bachelor of Music degree from there in 1940. When Léon Barzin heard her play, he said she should study with Carl Friedberg, and in 1941 she was awarded a fellowship to attend Juilliard so she could do so. She received her professional diploma from Juilliard in 1946. Carlson also studied with the British pianist Myra Hess.

== Career ==
Carlson taught as Carl Friedberg's assistant during Juilliard's summer school from 1947 until 1952. She joined the piano faculty at the Juilliard school in 1960 first teaching piano ensemble and adding piano pedagogy in 1965.

Carlson played solo piano recitals, joint recitals such as with the violinist Melvin Ritter, and as guest pianist with local symphonies. While she played pieces from multiple composers, she was especially known for her performances of the music of Paul Hindemith. She recorded his Ludus Tonalis in 1965, during a stay in Europe that also included a concert tour.

Carlson died in 1998.

== Honors and awards ==
Carlson won the Naumburg International Piano Competition in 1947, and then in later years served on its jury. In 1992 the Shenandoah Conservatory of Music awarded her an Honorary Doctor of Music degree.
