= Patricia Prattis Jennings =

American keyboardist

Patricia Prattis Jennings is a musician and author. She was the first African American woman to earn a contract with an American national symphony – with the Pittsburgh Symphony Orchestra as principal keyboardist.

== Early life and education ==
Jennings was born in Pittsburgh, Pennsylvania, USA, on July 16, 1941, (Note: According to Smith & Phelps (1992). University of Pittsburgh library collections states she was born in 1943.) to mother Helen Marie Sands Prattis, a seamstress and poet, and father P.L. Prattis, a journalist. She began learning piano at six and gave her debut solo piano performance with the Pittsburgh Symphony at 14, in 1956. She studied at Carnegie Tech (later the Carnegie Mellon University) and received a Bachelor and then a Masters of fine arts in 1962 and 1963 respectively. She then continued her studies at Indiana University under Sidney Foster.

== Career ==
In 1964 she spent three months in Europe sponsored by the US State Department with stops in Athens and Iran. In 1966 she was contracted with the Pittsburgh Symphony Orchestra playing piano, harpsichord, organ and celesta. In 1977 and 1978 she performed works of Mozart, along with Music Director Andre Previn, on the season-opening episodes of the PBS television series Previn and the Pittsburgh playing Sonatas for Four Hands and the Concerto for Two Pianos. She is one of two pianists on the critically acclaimed The Carnival of the Animals, Previn conducting. Touring with the Pittsburgh Symphony in 1987 as a Gershwin specialist she performed Gershwin's Concerto in F "to critical acclaim", appearing at festivals in Hong Kong, Osaka, Tokyo, and Edinburgh. In 1988 she founded, edited, and published Symphonium, a newsletter "...for and about the professional African-American symphony musician".

Jennings retired from her role with the Pittsburgh Symphony after 40 years in 2006. In 2013 she published "In One Era and Out the Other: Essays on Contemporary Life", a compilation of her columns for the Pittsburgh Post-Gazette and her blogposts. Her essays have appeared in the Pittsburgh Post-Gazette, the Pittsburgh City Paper, Symphony magazine, and The Phoenix, the newsletter of Western Pennsylvania Mensa.

A Steinway Artist, Jennings was honored in 1999 as a "Distinguished Daughter of Pennsylvania", a "History Maker" by the Senator John Heinz History Center in 2010, and in 2011 as the inaugural inductee on the New Pittsburgh Courier "50 Women of Excellence" list. She is one of the suggested subjects to replace a statue of Stephen Foster in Pittsburgh's Schenley Plaza.
