= Interlochen Public Radio =

Coordinates: 44°38′06.9″N 85°45′53.5″W

- Interlochen, Michigan; United States
- Broadcast area: WIAA: Cadillac-Traverse City; WIAB: Mackinaw City-St. Ignace

Programming
- Format: Public radio
- Affiliations: NPR

Ownership
- Owner: Interlochen Center for the Arts

Links
- Website: interlochenpublicradio.org

Interlochen Public Radio (IPR) is the National Public Radio member network for Northern Michigan, United States. It was established in 1963 and is operated by the Interlochen Center for the Arts, with studios across from the center's campus on Lyon Street in Interlochen, Michigan, just outside Traverse City. It broadcasts classical music, local news and NPR and Public Radio International programming on five stations in the northwestern Lower Peninsula.

At one point early in the 2000s, IPR led the nation in annual listener support. This was all the more remarkable because it is the second-smallest NPR member in Michigan, and one of the smallest in the entire NPR system.

== History ==
Joseph E. Maddy, founder of the National Music Camp (now the Interlochen Center for the Arts), had long wanted to bring a fine arts radio station to Northern Michigan. In 1963, WIAA signed on for the first time. Originally broadcasting eight hours per day, it grew enough within a decade to become a charter member of NPR. Interlochen Public Radio became a network in 1989 with the addition of WICV. Interlochen bought contemporary Christian station WDQV in 2005 and converted it into a third satellite for the eastern portion of the market, WIAB.

In 2000, Interlochen signed on WICA at 91.5, and by 2001 all NPR news and talk programming moved there from WIAA/WICV. However, WICA does not have nearly as large a footprint as WIAA. It must conform its signal to protect WHMW-FM in Mount Pleasant, also at 91.5. As a result, Cadillac, the second-largest city in IPR's service area, does not have a clear signal for NPR talk programming; WICA's signal in Cadillac is marginal at best, even after the addition of two repeaters for WICA since the turn of the millennium.

In 2018, Interlochen sold WICV to Northern Christian Radio for $150,000, and the station adopted a contemporary Christian format as an affiliate of The Promise FM.

== Stations ==
Since 2000, IPR has operated a two-service network. "Classical IPR" (formerly known as "IPR Music Radio") provides classical music and hourly NPR news updates for three stations. News and talk programming from NPR and other sources is heard on three stations, branded as "IPR News Radio".

Classical IPR stations
| Call sign | Frequency | City of license | ERP W | Height m (ft) | Class | FCC info |
|---|---|---|---|---|---|---|
| WIAA | 88.7 FM | Interlochen, Michigan | 100,000 | 315 meters (1,033 ft) | C | FCC (WIAA) |
| WIAB | 88.5 FM | Mackinaw City, Michigan | 20,000 | 239 meters (784 ft) | C1 | FCC (WIAB) |

IPR News Radio stations
| Call sign | Frequency | City of license | ERP W | Height m (ft) | Class | FCC info |
|---|---|---|---|---|---|---|
| WHBP | 90.1 FM | Harbor Springs, Michigan | 8,500 | 254 meters (833 ft) | C2 | FCC (WHBP) |
| WICA | 91.5 FM | Traverse City, Michigan | 4,000 | 228 meters (748 ft) | C3 | FCC (WICA) |
| WLMN | 89.7 FM | Manistee, Michigan | 15,000 | 86 meters (282 ft) | C3 | FCC (WLMN) |

== Sources ==
- Michiguide.com - WIAA History
- Michiguide.com - WIAB History
- Michiguide.com - WICA History
- Michiguide.com - WICV History

=== Podcasts ===
Interlochen Public Radio produces several podcasts, including Points North, a documentary storytelling podcast focused on culture, environment, and life in the Great Lakes region.

The podcast is hosted by Dan Wanschura and has received regional and national attention for its narrative reporting and audio documentaries.
