= P.L. Prattis =

American journalist

Percival Leroy (P.L.) Prattis (April 27, 1895 – February 29, 1980) was an American journalist. He was the city editor of the Chicago Defender, the most influential African-American weekly newspaper in the U.S. at the beginning of World War I. Later, he spent 30 years at the Pittsburgh Courier, another influential black paper, rising up to become executive editor.

== Life and career ==
P. L. Prattis was born on April 27, 1895, in Philadelphia, Pennsylvania. He attended the Hampton Institute from 1912 to 1915 and graduated in 1916 from the Ferris Institute. He served as a battalion sergeant major in the U.S. Army during World War I, headquartered in the Company 813 Pioneer Infantry, stationed in France for nearly a year in 1918 and 1919. He was honorably discharged from his duties on July 23, 1919.

Prattis began his journalism career in 1919 as the editor of the newly formed Michigan State News in Grand Rapids, Michigan. In 1921, he moved to Chicago, Illinois, to become the city editor of the Chicago Defender, which was the most influential African-American weekly newspaper in the country at the beginning of World War I. In 1923, Prattis was hired as the city editor of the Associated Negro Press in Chicago. In this position, for which he travelled internationally, he interviewed prominent world figures, such as: John F. Kennedy, Haile Selassie, Eleanor Roosevelt, Malcolm X, Jackie Robinson, W.E.B. Du Bois, Richard Nixon, Franklin Delano Roosevelt, Thurgood Marshall, Elijah Muhammad, Langston Hughes, Lyndon B. Johnson, Martin Luther King Jr., and many others. During his time at Chicago Defender Prattis curated and founded and was executive editor the first known black magazine called "The Light and Heebie Jeebies". Almost 20 years before Ebony Magazine and 26 years before Jet Magazine.

He moved to Pittsburgh, Pennsylvania, in 1936 to take the position of city editor with the Pittsburgh Courier. In 1947, Prattis was unanimously granted membership in the U.S. Senate and House press galleries by the executive committee of the Periodical Correspondents Association. That year he was the first African-American journalist permitted to enter the United States Congress via the Periodical Press Galleries of the United States Congress. Prattis became the Courier's managing editor in 1948, and then executive editor in 1956.

When the Pittsburgh Courier was in financial jeopardy during the 1960s, Prattis donated $33,000 of his own money to help stabilize the paper. He remained executive editor until 1965, retiring after John H. Sengstacke purchased the ailing paper.

On February 29, 1980, Prattis died at the Veterans Administration Hospital in Aspinwall, Pennsylvania. His burial was at Homewood Cemetery, Pittsburgh.

Prattis was honored posthumously for his part in African-American media and service to the Pittsburgh Courier at the 100th anniversary celebration for the Courier.

Prattis has a legacy in the history of black press, Charles Simmons goes to explain how, “The importance and effectiveness of the black press should not be discussed without mentioning Percival Prattis. Although he was not the only black newspaper editor fighting against injustices during World War II, the [Pittsburgh] Courier was the leader in this struggle.”

== Personal life and family ==
His wife, Helen Prattis, was a skilled seamstress and poet, whose work, under the title Everyday Verse, appeared weekly in the Pittsburgh Courier from 1951 through 1953. Their daughter, Patricia Prattis Jennings, was the Principal Keyboard of the Pittsburgh Symphony Orchestra from 1966 to 2006.
