= María del Mar Fernández (actress) =

Dominican actress, dancer and acrobat

María del Mar Fernández González (born 9 September 1995) is a Dominican actress, dancer and acrobat best known for her supporting role of Amanda Walker in Shotgun Wedding directed by Jason Moore Amazon Prime in early 2023.

== Early life ==
Fernández grew up as a gymnast in Santo Domingo, DR while attending the Comunidad Educativa Lux Mundi. In 2003 she performed at the opening ceremony of the Pan American Games and debuted as the leading actress in the school's "tarde cultural", Los Zapaticos de Rosa where her passion for storytelling began. In 2010 she was accepted into Interlochen Arts Academy in Michigan, USA where she completed a 4-year pre-college program majoring in Theatre and graduated in the spring of 2014. She further continued her training at Emerson College, Boston where she achieved a Bachelor of Fine Arts in 2018. Additional training includes the New York Film Academy, Royal Academy of Dramatic Arts, London Dramatic Academy & New England Center of Circus Arts.

== Filmography ==
Year	Title	Role	Notes
2016	High, Hello	Jen	6 episodes
2018	Dreamer: A Dance Narrative	Dreamer	short
2019	Aleita	Marisol	short
2022	Padre Se Busca	Secretaria	Bonter Media
2022	Shotgun Wedding	Amanda Walker	Amazon Prime
2023	Rêverie	Violeta joven	short
2024	Dueños del Tiempo	Doctora	Cayenna Films

=== Theatre ===
Year	Title	Role	Notes
2012	West Side Story	Bebecita	Interlochen Arts Academy
2014	Sonnets for an Old Century	Doris DiFranecio	Edinburgh Fringe Festival
2016	We Are Pussy Riot	Prosecutor / Madonna	EmStage
2016	The House of Bernarda Alba	Martirio	EmStage
2018	Antigone Project	Antigone	EmStage
2019	Julio Down by the Schoolyard	Cis, Cop #2, Mom #2	INTAR Theatre
2019	Desarrolo	Young Nelly	The Lark
2019	Why Women Cry	Hidden Woman	Estrogenius Festival
2023	Grease	Patty Simcox	Eduardo Brito National Theater
2024	Escape Room	Vicky	Lope de Vega Theatre Novo-Centro
2025	Los Demonios del Amor	Rafa	Casa de Teatro
