= George Katz =

American pianist (1925–2022)

George Katz (6 October 1925 - 1 October 2022) was an American pianist who graduated from the Juilliard School in New York City, receiving an undergraduate and a graduate degree in piano. Juilliard was also where he studied piano with Josef Raieff. In 1956, Katz was the winner of the Naumburg International Piano Competition. He received a Fulbright grant to study in Paris, where he had lessons with Alfred Cortot. He performed concerts throughout Europe as well as in Japan, Latin America, and the U.S. Of a 1961 Carnegie Hall recital. The New York Times wrote: “The kind of fire, brio and brimstone that turned into a first-class display of both sparks and substance.”

George Katz was a longtime member of the Ohio University music faculty later teaching at Drake University in Iowa, and at San Diego State University. Katz died on 1 October 2022.
