= Margaret Baxtresser =

American pianist

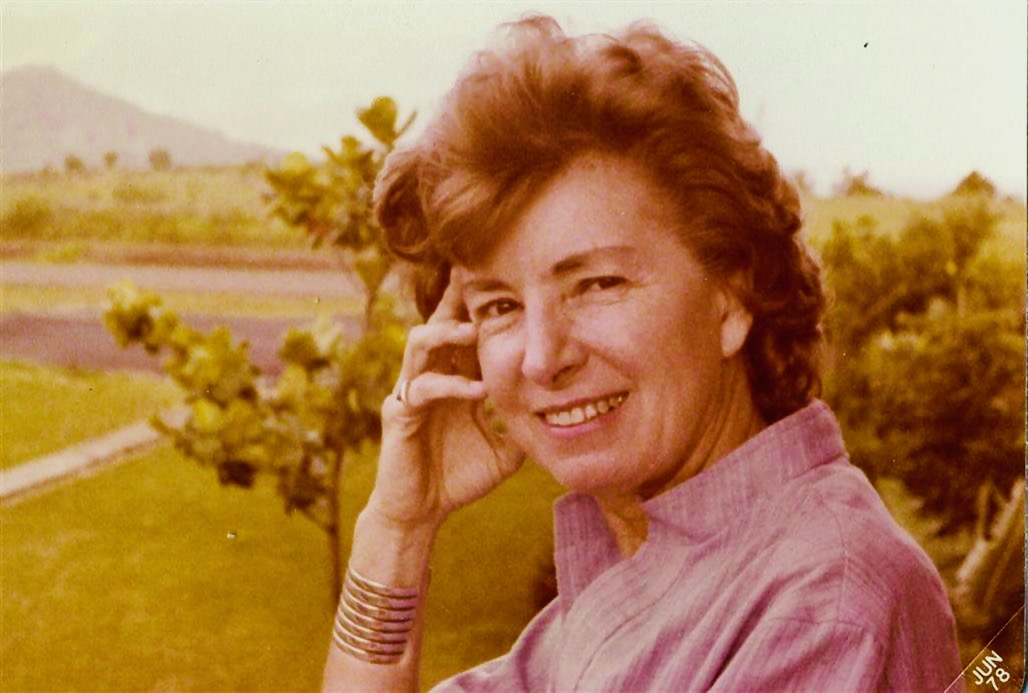
Baxtresser at age 56

Margaret Barthel Baxtresser (June 10, 1922 – June 7, 2005) was an internationally renowned American concert pianist. She was born and raised in Detroit, Michigan.

At age 13, she was a soloist with the Detroit Symphony Orchestra. At age 28, she won the Walter W. Naumburg Foundation International Piano Competition. Her concert career included performing recitals and soloing with major symphony orchestras which took her to venues around the globe.

In 1994, she became the first American artist to perform in Vietnam after the Vietnam War. The government of Vietnam invited her back on several occasions to perform. When Baxtresser died, she left her library of piano and chamber music to the Hanoi Conservatory of Music (now called The Vietnam National Academy of Music).

A supporter of the arts in her local community of Akron, Ohio, as well as internationally, she was a professor emerita at Kent State University, where she taught piano for 25 years. She was married to Earl Baxtresser, with whom she raised two sons, two daughters, and two adopted daughters. Her eldest daughter is flutist Jeanne Baxtresser, former principal flute of the New York Philharmonic.

During her career Baxtresser performed as a Baldwin artist, and had two Baldwin grand pianos in her home.

At the time of her death in 2005, the Tuesday Musical Association in Akron, Ohio, established a fund to dedicate one concert each season in tribute to Baxtresser. She had been a devoted supporter of Tuesday Musical for many years. Performers who have appeared on the Tuesday Musical Margaret Baxtresser Annual Piano Concert series include piano luminaries such as Emanuel Ax, Joyce Yang, Garrick Ohlsson, Fei-Fei, Yuja Wang, Conrad Tao, and Martín García García.

== Historic piano ==
Baxtresser left her historic Bechstein piano to the Schubert Club in Saint Paul, Minnesota to be a part of their Museum of Musical Instruments. Baxtresser acquired the piano from the estate of her teacher, Charles DeBodo. The piano, made in Berlin in 1878, was shipped to Budapest for a recital by Nikolai Rubinstein. It stayed in DeBodo’s home and was reportedly played by Johannes Brahms, Franz Liszt, Gustav Mahler, Béla Bartok, Zoltán Kodaly, and Ernst von Dohnanyi.

While Baxtresser owned the piano, it was played by leading composers, conductors, and concert pianists of the time who visited her home in Akron including André Watts, Leonard Slatkin, Ned Rorem, Maxim Shostakovich, Vincent Persichetti, and Vladimir Ashkenazy.
