= Andre-Michel Schub =

French classical pianist (born 1952)

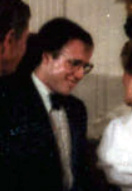
- Andre-Michel Schub, 1981

Background information
- Born: December 26, 1952 (age 73); Paris, France
- Education: Princeton University; Curtis Institute of Music
- Genre: Classical
- Occupations: Classical pianist, piano educator
- Instrument: Piano
- Awards: Naumburg International Piano Competition (1974); Avery Fisher Prize (1977); Van Cliburn Gold Medal (1981)

Andre-Michel Schub (born 26 December 1952, in Paris) is a classical pianist.

== Biography ==
Schub came to New York City with his family, when he was eight months old. He began his piano studies with his mother when he was four, and later continued his work with Jascha Zayde. He graduated from Midwood High School in Brooklyn, New York, and attended Princeton University, and then transferred to the Curtis Institute of Music, where he studied with Rudolf Serkin, from 1970 to 1973. He judged the 1997 Hilton Head Competition.

He has taught at the Manhattan School of Music, since 2006.

== Prizes ==
In 1974 Schub took first prize at the Naumburg Competition. In 1977 he received the Avery Fisher Prize. In 1981 he won the Gold medal at the Van Cliburn International Competition

== Concert career ==
His New York debut at Alice Tully Hall on May 13, 1974, was reviewed by The New York Times as an "impressive debut". In 1979, he became the pianist for the New York Chamber Music Society. Schub appears frequently as guest artist with Mostly Mozart, Tanglewood, Ravinia, and Blossom festivals. He has performed with major orchestras, including the Boston, Chicago, Cincinnati, Dallas, Detroit, St. Louis and Cleveland and Philadelphia symphony orchestras and the Los Angeles and New York philharmonics and the Royal Concertgebouw. He is an artist of The Chamber Music Society of Lincoln Center. Since 1997, he has been music director of the Virginia Arts Festival Chamber Music Series.

On Independence Day 1986, in the PBS-televised program "A Capitol Fourth, 1986," he performed Piano Concerto No. 1 (Tchaikovsky) with the National Symphony Orchestra, conducted by Mstislav Rostropovich.

He has performed on Saint Paul Sunday, and Performance Today.

On May 19, 2006, he gave the world premier performance of Bright Sheng's "Three Fantasies for Violin and Piano," commissioned by the McKim Fund in the Library of Congress. That same year, he performed with the Naumburg Orchestral Concerts, in the Naumburg Bandshell, Central Park, in the summer series.

== Recordings ==
- Beethoven: Piano Sonatas Nos. 3 & 23 ("Appassionata"), Vox (Classical), ASIN: B00008FZYM (November 4, 1992)
- Bright Sheng: 3 Fantasies: No. 3. Kazakhstan Love Song, Naxos, ASIN: B001P2C34I, January 27, 2009
- Van Cliburn Competition 1981, Video Artists Int'l, ASIN: B00000I7H7, November 30, 1999
- Asia: Concerto For Piano, Koch Int'l Classics, ASIN: B000001SJK, November 18, 1997
- A Mozart Celebration: Virginia Arts Festival, Musical Heritage Society, ASIN: B000KLVS50
- Stravinsky: Suite Italienne/Duo Concertant/Divertimento, Sony, ASIN: B0000026EE, October 25, 1990
- Brahms: Variations and Fugue on a Theme by Handel, Op. 24, Liszt: Grande Etudes de Paganini (No. 2 in E-flat and No. 6 in A minor), Dante Sonata, Vox Cum Laude, ASIN: B001OF7NOG,
- The American Album, Rca Victor Red Seal, Catalog #68114
- Rorem: Winter Pages, Bright Music, New World Records, Catalog #80416
- Ludwig van Beethoven: Sonata No. 23 in F Minor, Opus 57 and Sonata No. 3 in C Major Opus 2, Vox Cum Laude, D-VCS 9062 (1984)
- Plays Schubert "Wanderer Fantasy," Chopin Fantasy in F minor, Op. 49, Mendelssohn Fantasy in F-sharp minor, Op.28. [LP] Cum Laude (Moss Music Group) D-VCL 9075 (1982)

=== MP3 Downloads ===
- Bright Sheng: 3 Fantasies: No. 1. Dreams Song
- Bright Sheng: 3 Fantasies: No. 2. Tibetan Air

=== DVD ===
- Sixth Van Cliburn International Piano Competition - Andre-Michel Schub, Panayis Lyras, Santiago Rodriguez, HARMONIA MUNDI, Part#4504
