= Anna Fidler =

Anna Fidler (born 1973) is an artist and educator living in Corvallis, Oregon.

== Biography ==
Anna Fidler was born in Traverse City, Michigan. She has a BFA (1995) from Western Michigan University and an MFA (2005) from Portland State University. Fidler studied Visual Art and Creative Writing at Interlochen Arts Academy (1991) and French and Art History at the Alliance Francaise (1993), Paris. She is currently a professor at Oregon State University. Fidler lives in Oregon's Willamette Valley. Fidler had a solo exhibit at the Portland Art Museum in 2012.

== Exhibition reviews ==
Fidler's exhibitions have been reviewed in Art in America, Artweek and The San Francisco Chronicle.

== Collections ==
Fidler's work is included in the collections of The Portland Art Museum, and the Portland and Seattle Portable Works Collections.
