= WQHN =

Christian radio station in East Jordan, Michigan, United States

Coordinates: 45.178°N 85.099°W

- East Jordan, Michigan; United States
- Broadcast area: Petoskey
- Frequency: 100.9 MHz
- Branding: "The Promise FM"

Programming
- Format: Christian

Ownership
- Owner: Northern Christian Radio

History
- First air date: June 25, 1989
- Former call signs: WIZY (1987–2003); WICV (2003–2018)

Technical information
- Licensing authority: FCC
- Class: A
- ERP: 2,800 watts
- HAAT: 149 meters (489 ft)

Links
- Public license information: Public file; LMS
- Website: promisefm.com

WQHN (100.9 FM, "The Promise FM") is a radio station in East Jordan, Michigan. Broadcasting a Christian format, the station is owned by Northern Christian Radio.

== History ==
WQHN began broadcasting on June 25, 1989 with the call sign WIZY. Interlochen Center for the Arts acquired the license for WIZY from Gretchen E. Millich, a broadcaster, journalist and attorney who held the original construction permit. Millich never built the station, but instead donated the license to Interlochen. Interlochen then changed its call sign to WICV on August 11, 2003. The station was an affiliate of Interlochen Public Radio's "Classical IPR" network.

Effective March 26, 2018, Interlochen Center for the Arts sold WICV to Northern Christian Radio for $150,000, and the station picked up the new owner's "The Promise FM" Christian programming. The station's call sign was changed to WQHN the same day.
