= Soyeon Kate Lee =

Korean-American classical pianist (born 1979)

- Born: Seoul, South Korea
- Origin: Seoul, South Korea
- Genres: Classical music
- Occupation: Musician
- Instrument: Piano
- Website: www.soyeonkatelee.com

Soyeon Kate Lee (이소연) is a Korean-American classical pianist, who currently lives in New York, US. She is on the College and Pre-College piano faculty at the Juilliard School.

== Early life and education ==
Born in Seoul, South Korea, Soyeon Kate Lee moved to the United States at the age of 9. Lee's early studies were with Romanian teacher Marina di Pretoro and at the Interlochen Arts Academy with Victoria Mushkatkol. She graduated from the Interlochen Arts Academy with the highest honors in music. She continued her studies at The Juilliard School with Jerome Lowenthal and Robert McDonald, earning her Bachelors, Masters, and Artist Diploma degrees. During her studies at Juilliard, she won the school's concerto competition, Gina Bachauer piano competition, Helen Fay Prize, Arthur Rubinstein Prize, and the Petschek Piano Debut Award. She received her Doctorate from The Graduate Center at CUNY where she worked with Ursula Oppens and Richard Goode.

== Professional career ==
Lee gave her New York debut recital at Lincoln Center's Alice Tully Hall as the winner of Juilliard's Petschek Award in April 2004. The following year, Lee gave a recital at New York's Weill Hall to critical acclaim under the auspices of Concert Artists Guild. This concert propelled her career with engagements throughout the United States.

Lee received media attention for her eco-awareness concert at Carnegie Hall's Zankel Hall in 2008 wearing a dress made of 5,000 juice pouches.

In 2012, Lee joined the roster of The Chamber Music Society of Lincoln Center Two.

Ms. Lee is currently represented by Colbert Artists Management in New York City.

=== Teaching ===
Lee was Associate Professor of Music in Piano at the University of Cincinnati – College-Conservatory of Music.

== Awards ==
date	award	awarded by	location
2001, 2002	first prize	Juilliard Gina Bachauer International Piano Competition	New York City, New York City
2002	third prize	Paloma O'Shea International Piano Competition	Santander, Cantabria, Spain
2003	second prize	Cleveland International Piano Competition	Cleveland, Ohio, USA
2004	winner	Concert Artists Guild International Auditions	New York City, USA
2009	young artist award	Classical Recording Foundation	New York City, USA
2010	first prize	Naumburg International Piano Competition	New York City, USA

== Discography ==
Ms. Lee is a Naxos Records recording artist. In 2008, Naxos released Lee's debut album of Domenico Scarlatti Sonatas to critical acclaim. Lee's next album released in 2013 featured Franz Liszt's opera transcriptions. She released two further Naxos CDs of Scriabin's piano music. Ms. Lee has also released an album titled "Re!nvented" under Entertainment One, formerly KOCH records which garnered the Young Artist Award from the Classical Recording Foundation and further industry acclaim.

== Personal life ==
She married Israeli-American pianist Ran Dank on September 7, 2013. As of 2021 she resides in Cincinnati, teaching at University of Cincinnati College-Conservatory of Music. Her younger sister, Soeun Nikole Lee 이소은 is a Korean pop singer, lawyer, and author.
