= Jeanne Baxtresser =

American flutist and teacher (born 1947)

- Born: August 2, 1947 (age 79); Bethlehem, Pennsylvania, U.S.
- Genre: Classical
- Occupations: Musician, Teacher
- Instruments: Flute
- Awards: NFA Lifetime Achievement Award

Jeanne Baxtresser (born August 2, 1947) is an American flutist and teacher. She is most notable for her position as principal flutist of the New York Philharmonic for over 15 years, as an author (Orchestral Excerpts for Flute with Piano Accompaniment), and as a professor and master teacher. Previous positions include professor of flute at the University of Montréal, The University of Toronto, Juilliard School, Manhattan School of Music, New England conservatory and Carnegie Mellon University. She received the National Flute Association's Lifetime Achievement Award in 2006. She has been credited with "upholding an increasingly higher standard of artistic excellence for the flute."

== Biography ==
Jeanne Baxtresser was born August 2, 1947, in Bethlehem, Pennsylvania to Earl and Margaret (Barthel) Baxtresser. The eldest of six children, Baxtresser was surrounded by music in her childhood, as her mother was an award-winning concert pianist. She began piano lessons from an early age but called her piano debut "a disaster." She began playing the flute at age 10 and quickly realized it was the instrument for her. By this time, the family had moved to Minneapolis, where a family friend began giving her flute lessons. She quickly progressed in these lessons and began studying with Emil Opava, then of the Minnesota Orchestra. During these years, Baxtresser also attended the Interlochen National Music Camp and Academy as a flute pupil of Gary Sigurdson. She made her orchestral debut at age 14 with the Minnesota Orchestra.

Baxtresser auditioned for and was accepted into the Juilliard School of Music in New York City, starting in 1965. She studied with Julius Baker for four years, working with many of the influential composers and colleagues of the time, including conductor Leonard Slatkin and pianists Emanuel Ax, Garrick Ohlsson, and Jeffrey Siegel.

During her final year at Juilliard, Baxtresser won the position of principal flute of the Montreal Symphony in 1969, and shortly after was hired as professor of flute at McGill University in Montreal. She was subsequently appointed principal flute of the Toronto Symphony Orchestra in 1976, before being invited by music director Zubin Mehta to join the New York Philharmonic in 1981. The first female principal flute of the New York Philharmonic, Baxtresser appeared as soloist with the New York Philharmonic on more than fifty occasions and has been featured as a soloist across North America and Europe. She retired from the New York Philharmonic in 1998 to focus on full-time teaching.

While in New York, Baxtresser served on the faculties of the Juilliard School from 1985 to 2011 and the Manhattan School of Music from 1990 to 2001. In 1998, she was appointed the Vira I. Heinz Professor of Flute at Carnegie Mellon University in Pittsburgh. In all of these positions, she has attracted many outstanding flute students from around the world.

Baxtresser's career as a recitalist, concerto soloist, and chamber musician has produced numerous recordings, including New York Legends - Jeanne Baxtresser (Cala), Jeanne Baxtresser—A Collection of My Favorites (MSR Classics), and Chamber Music for Flute (Cala), featuring her performances with principal players of the New York Philharmonic. She has recorded works under the baton of such legendary conductors as Leonard Bernstein, Zubin Mehta and Kurt Masur.

In addition to performing and teaching, Baxtresser has released a work entitled Orchestral Excerpts for Flute with Piano Accompaniment (Theodore Presser), with a companion CD, Orchestral Excerpts for Flute with Spoken Commentary (Summit Records). This work has become a vital part of flute pedagogy, as her narration of the excerpts make it possible for students of all levels to receive her coaching. A subsequent book, Great Flute Duos from the Orchestral Repertoire, was named the 2004 winner of the National Flute Association's Newly Published Music Competition and has quickly become a part of standard pedagogical repertoire.

Recipient of the National Flute Association's Lifetime Achievement Award for significant, lasting contributions to the flute world, Baxtresser was also awarded the National Medal of Arts from the Interlochen Center for the Arts. Carnegie Mellon University named Baxtresser "University Professor," a position typically awarded to individuals who have achieved exceptional international recognition. She is recognized internationally as a leading recording artist, author, and lecturer.

== Personal life ==
Baxtresser has been married since 1976 to bassoonist David H. Carroll. They met while working together in the Montreal Symphony Orchestra.

== Discography ==
- Romantic Flute Music (1977)
- The Magic Flute (1988)
- The Baroque Flute (1989)
- The Baroque Album (1992)
- Orchestral Excerpts for Flute (1995)
- A Flute Masterclass (1997)
- Great Flute Duos (2002)
- Jeanne Baxtresser, Debut Solo Recording, Montreal 1977 (2002)
- Jeanne Baxtresser: A Collection of My Favorites (2006)
- Chamber Music for Flute (2006)
