= John Newsom =

American painter (born 1970)

John Newsom (born 1970 in Hutchinson, Kansas) is an American painter best known for his thickly layered, gestural paintings of pastoral flora and fauna subject matter.

== Early life and education ==
Newsom grew up in Kansas and Oklahoma. He completed high school in 1988 at the prestigious Interlochen Arts Academy located in northern Michigan. In 1992 he completed his Bachelor of Fine Arts degree at the Rhode Island School of Design and subsequently moved to New York City, where he attended New York University’s studio arts program. He graduated with a Master of Fine Arts degree from NYU at the age of 24.

== Career ==
John Newsom is a New York–based painter recognized for his vibrant, symbolically charged compositions that merge the vitality of the natural world with a dynamic, gestural abstraction. His paintings, often layered with allegorical meaning, have been presented internationally in both gallery and institutional contexts, including solo exhibitions at Marc Straus Gallery in New York, Patrick Painter Inc. in Los Angeles, and Brintz Gallery in Palm Beach, as well as major showcases across Europe in Milan, Geneva, Ljubljana, Zagreb, and Tenerife. Beyond his solo career, he has curated and contributed to notable group exhibitions featuring artists such as Peter Saul, André Butzer, and Ai Weiwei, positioning his work within significant dialogues in contemporary painting. His art is included in the permanent collections of the Museum of Modern Art, the Whitney Museum of American Art, the Hammer Museum, the San Francisco Museum of Modern Art, and the Yale University Art Gallery, affirming his place in the institutional landscape of American art. Widely covered in publications such as The New York Times, Artforum, Flash Art, Artnet, Cultured, Vogue, and The Wall Street Journal, Newsom has also appeared on the cover of Art + Auction as one of five emerging painters shaping the future of the medium. His practice, rooted in both painterly tradition and poetic symbolism, continues to resonate globally, sustaining his critical and institutional relevance.

== Personal life ==
Newsom lives in Brooklyn, New York with his wife Cassie Newsom and their two children Luke and Ruby Newsom.

== Recent solo exhibitions ==
2025 The Seven Deadly Sins and The Seven Heavenly Virtues, Kebbel-Villa Museum, Schwandorf, Germany (two-artist exhibition with Raymond Pettibon) (catalogue)

2024 New Growth in an Old Garden, Kunstverein Heppenheim, Heppenheim, Germany (catalogue)

Forest of the Happy Ever After (The Complete Paintings for the Album by Killah Priest), The Brattleboro Museum & Art Center, Brattleboro, Vermont (catalogue)

BEASTS, Marc Straus Gallery, New York

2023 The Shangri-La Suite and Related Works, AMELCHENKO, Sea Bright, New Jersey

Universal Frontier, Mark Arts (Mary R Koch Arts Center), Wichita, Kansas (catalogue)

2022 Nature’s Course, Oklahoma Contemporary Museum & Arts Center, Oklahoma City, Oklahoma (catalogue)

Classical Elements, COUNTY, Palm Beach, Florida (two-artist exhibition with Raymond Pettibon) (catalogue)

2019 Eye of the Beholder, Contra Gallery, Ljubljana, Slovenia

2018 Shangri-La, Brintz Gallery, Palm Beach, Florida (catalogue)

2016 Patrick Painter Inc., Los Angeles (West Gallery) (two-artist exhibition with Rinus Van De Velde)

2015 Marc Straus Gallery, New York (catalogue)

Rogue Arena, MANA Contemporary, Jersey City, New Jersey (catalogue)

2013 Bestiary, Marc Straus Gallery, New York

2011-12 Crescendo, The Richard J. Massey Foundation for the Arts and Sciences, New York (catalogue)

2011 Nocturne Paintings, Patrick Painter Inc., Los Angeles (West Gallery)

Motifs and Methods, Patrick Painter Inc., Los Angeles (East Gallery)

2009 Beyond the Horizon, Patrick Painter Inc., Los Angeles (West Gallery)

== Publications ==
- 2022 John Newsom: Nature’s Course. Texts by Matt Dillon, Jeremiah Davis, Christian Malycha, Louisa McCune, and André Butzer. Published by Oklahoma Contemporary, Oklahoma City, O.K.
- 2015 John Newsom: Rogue Arena. Text by Barry Schwabsky. Published by Mana Contemporary, Jersey City, N.J. and Marc Straus Gallery, New York.
- 2011 John Newsom: Crescendo. Text by Nicola Trezzi. Published by Charta, Milan, Italy and The Richard J. Massey Foundation for the Arts and Sciences, New York.
- 2010 John Newsom: Allegories of Naturalism. Texts by Ross Bleckner and Marc Straus. Published by Charta, Milan, Italy and Patrick Painter Inc., Los Angeles, C.A.
