= Interlochen Center for the Arts =

Non-profit corporation in Green Lake Township, Michigan

Coordinates: 44.62927°N 85.76820°W

- 4000 J. Maddy Parkway; Interlochen, Michigan 49643; United States

Information
- Other names: ICA, "Inty"
- Type: Educational institution, non-profit
- Motto: "Dedicated to the promotion of world friendship through the universal language of the arts."
- Religious affiliation: Secular
- Established: 1928
- Founder: Joseph E. Maddy
- President: Trey Devey
- Enrollment: Camp (summer): 3,344; Academy (school year): ~500
- Campus: 1,200 acres (490 ha), wooded, rural, between two lakes, adjacent to Interlochen State Park
- Colors: Blue; White
- Team name: Fighting Blueberries
- Website: www.interlochen.org

Interlochen Center for the Arts (/ˈɪntərˈlɒkən/ IN-tər-lock-ən; also known as ICA or Interlochen and previously known as the National Music Camp) is an American non-profit corporation which operates arts education programs and performance venues. Established in 1928 by Joseph E. Maddy, Interlochen Center for the Arts is located on a 1,200-acre (490 ha) campus in Green Lake Township, Grand Traverse County, Michigan, immediately south of the eponymous community of Interlochen and about 10 miles (16 km) southwest of Traverse City.

== History ==
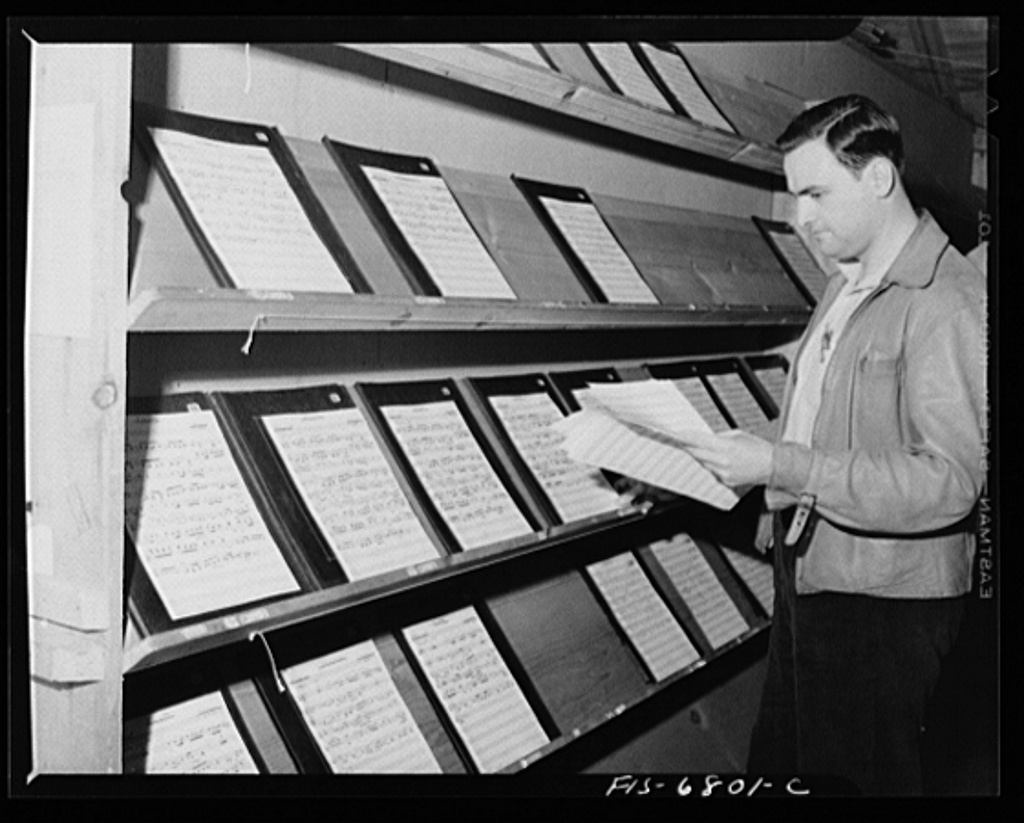
Score sheets at Interlochen's Music Library in the 1940s. Photograph by Arthur Siegel.

In 1925, Music Supervisors National Conference President Edgar B. Gordon asked conductor and educator Joseph E. Maddy to assemble talented high school musicians from around the US to perform at the conference's 1926 gathering in Detroit, Michigan. The resulting ensemble, the National High School Orchestra, performed at Detroit's Orchestra Hall on April 16, 1926. The orchestra was asked to reconvene in 1927 and 1928.

In 1927, Maddy incorporated the National High School Orchestra Camp, and began searching for ideal locations, eventually narrowing it down to sites in Maine and Michigan. He was invited by Interlochen businessman Willis Pennington to tour his hotel and summer camp properties, adjacent to Interlochen State Park (Camp Interlochen and Camp Penn Loch, for boys and girls, respectively). Maddy chose the site, and, in 1928, the first season of the National High School Orchestra Camp convened. In 1932, the Camp changed its name to the National Music Camp; despite the addition of other artistic disciplines, the name remained until 1991, when it was updated to Interlochen Arts Camp.

In 1944, Maddy purchased Camps Interlochen and Penn Loch, absorbing them into the National Music Camp.

Interlochen Arts Academy, a year-round arts boarding school affiliated with the Camp and housed on the same campus, opened in 1962. The school, which combines college-preparatory academics with conservatory-caliber arts training, was the first of its kind in the United States.

In 1963, Interlochen Public Radio (WIAA) started to broadcast. Originally broadcasting eight hours per day, it grew enough within a decade to become a charter member of National Public Radio. Interlochen Public Radio became a network in 1989 with the addition of WICV. Interlochen bought contemporary Christian station WDQV in 2005 and converted it into a third satellite for the eastern portion of the market, WIAB.

== Campus and programs ==
=== Interlochen Arts Camp (IAC) ===
A camp has existed on the current site since 1918, when Camp Interlochen for girls was opened. In 1922, Camp Penn Loch for boys opened. In 1944, the two were merged together with what was then called the "National High School Orchestra Camp" to form the National Music Camp. Over the years, the camp expanded beyond instrumental music to include theatre, dance and other areas of study.

In 1991, Interlochen Arts Camp began after restructuring from the National Music Camp. Campers are divided into three groups:

- Junior Division – Grades 3–6
- Intermediate Division – Grades 6–8
- High School Division – Grades 9–12

All summer campers and staff members wear the traditional Interlochen camp uniform, which is dark blue pants, and light blue shirts, along with a lanyard that identifies their specific division or camp role. On Sundays, a white shirt is required to be worn.

The camp combines traditional camp activities with professional performing arts training and performance opportunities. Campers live in rustic cabins divided by division. Varying lengths of camp are offered, with most campers enrolling in two and three week programs. A limited number of six week programs are also offered.

To provide more opportunities for students, Interlochen opened a day camp for students that do not wish to live on campus. The day camp is operated from the Interlochen Community Center.

==== Ann Arbor Public School Partnership ====
Interlochen has partnered with the high school music programs at Ann Arbor Public Schools since 1977, when Huron High School and Pioneer High School began bringing their music students (choir, marching band, orchestra) to Interlochen. This typically happens in late August prior to school starting, but after the regular camp season has ended. Skyline High School joined this tradition upon its opening in 2008.

=== Interlochen Arts Academy (ICA) ===
Beginning in 1962, Interlochen Arts Academy is a year-round boarding school that combines traditional high school studies and activities with professional performing arts training and performance opportunities. Students live on campus in dormitory style residence halls, although it is not required to live on campus.

Dormitories:

- Thor Johnson Hall – named after Thor Johnson
- Mozart-Beethoven Hall – named after Wolfgang Amadeus Mozart and Ludwig van Beethoven
- Brahms Hall – named after Johannes Brahms
- Picasso Hall – named after Pablo Picasso
- Hemingway – named after Ernest Hemingway
- DeRoy Hall – named after the Deroy Family
- Dow Hall – named after the Dow Family

=== Interlochen College of Creative Arts (ICCA) ===
The Interlochen College of Creative Arts provides continuing education programs for adults to further their creative studies or try a new one. While programs vary year to year, many are offered each year with returning participants. Some of the long running programs include:

- Interlochen Adult Choir and Choral Conducting Camp
- Interlochen Adult Flute Camp
- Interlochen Adult Guitar Camp
- Interlochen Symphonic Band Camp
- Interlochen Chamber Music Camp

=== Interlochen Presents ===
Throughout the year, the Interlochen Presents department books large and small acts to play at the multiple stages that exist on the Interlochen campus. Summer concerts are scheduled each year, known as the "Interlochen Arts Festival" which typically runs from June through August.

Performances venues include:

- Interlochen Bowl – opened in 1928, used for concerts and the annual end of camp performance, Les Preludes
- Kresge Auditorium – opened in 1948, and used for large acts and major gatherings. The auditorium is named after the Kresge Family and the The Kresge Foundation.
- Corson Auditorium – opened in 1975, a traditional Broadway style theatre used for musicals and large acts that prefer an indoor or more intimate setting, named after the Corson family.
- Dendrinos Chapel – opened in 1981, and named after Michael P. Dendrinos, a 13 year boy who died in 1971 and was the son of Interlochen board member Peter Dendrinos.
- Upton-Morley Stage, opened in 2011, an outdoor theatre space
- Phoenix Theatre, opened in 1994, a smaller indoor theatre and flexible black box space
- Harvey Theatre, opened in 1998, a smaller indoor theatre

=== Interlochen Shakespeare Festival ===
Beginning in 2008, and located at the Morley-Upton stage, a Shakespeare play is chosen each year and performed. Actors often include Interlochen affiliated alumni.

- 2023 – Julius Caesar
- 2024 – The Comedy of Errors
- 2025 – Measure for Measure
- 2026 – A Midsummer Night's Dream

=== Walter E. Hastings Museum ===
Located on the campus of Interlochen Center for the Arts, the Walter Hastings Museum contains the archive of Walter E. Hastings (1887–1965), a photographer and naturalist that spent several years creating work on the land in and around Interlochen. Opened in 1956, the museum contains photographs, a mineral collection, and other artifacts he curated during his lifetime.

=== Interlochen Public Radio ===
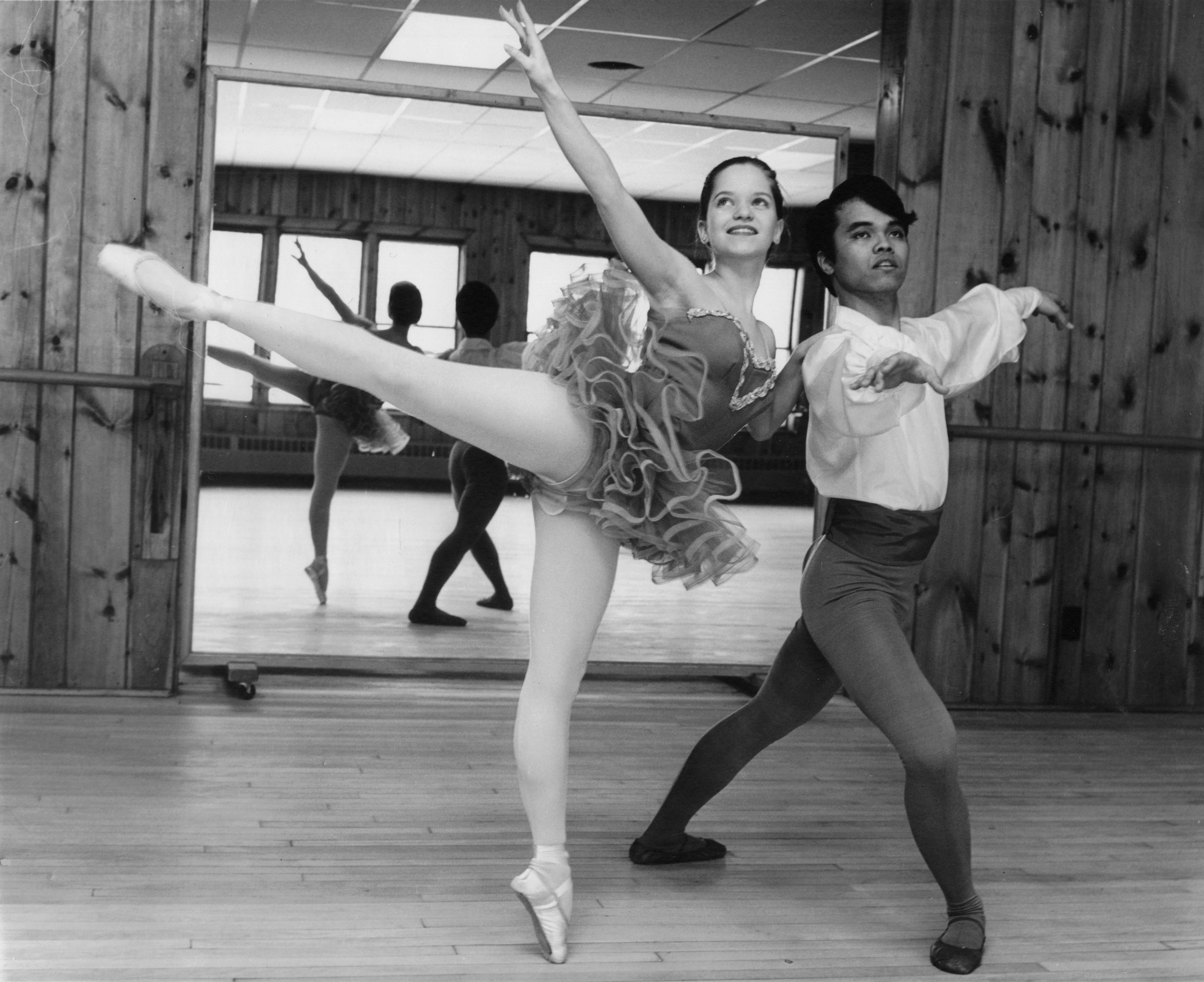
Dancers rehearsing at Interlochen, 1969

Interlochen Center for the Arts is home to Interlochen Public Radio (or IPR), a National Public Radio member station that broadcasts a signal to most of the lower peninsula of Northern Michigan as well as parts of eastern Wisconsin. Two listener-supported stations broadcast to northwest Michigan: Classical Music 88.7, 88.5, 94.7 and 100.9 FM; and News Radio 91.5, 90.1 and 89.7 FM. Broadcasts include arts programming, news and culture from around the world, as well as local and regional news. IPR was a charter member of National Public Radio.

Founded in 1963, Interlochen Public Radio or WIAA was envisioned as an extension of the Music From Interlochen program which ran on the NBC radio network. The Music From Interlochen program informed a wider audience about the activities at the then-named National Music Camp and the nascent Interlochen Arts Academy. The station was slow to catch on in its early years and some considered shutting down the operation. Interlochen Public Radio went on to establish itself with two service channels: one for music and one for news.

In 1993, Interlochen Public Radio reportedly had one of the highest rates of per capita contributions of any public radio station in the United States. The station's classical music service is broadcast from their main tower at WIAA 88.7 FM in Interlochen, along with WIAB 88.5 FM in Mackinaw City, and W234BU 94.7 FM in Traverse City. In 2000, IPR began offering a separate news service on WICA 91.5 FM in Traverse City, and later added WLMN 89.7 FM in Manistee and WHBP 90.1 FM in Harbor Springs.

Original 60 Minutes anchor Mike Wallace famously started his broadcasting career on Interlochen Public Radio in the summer of 1939, after finishing school.

=== Stone Hotel and Cottages ===
Interlochen operates the Stone Hotel and Cottages from within the Interlochen campus. Named after W. Clement Stone, the hotel provides traditional hotel rooms that are open to the public, along with cottages and cabins scattered across the Interlochen campus. The current hotel opened in 1958 and was built from money donated by W. Clement Stone after the original hotel, built in 1909, the Pennington, was demolished in 1954.

Some notable cabins on campus include:

- Fay Maddy House – named after Fay Maddy, wife of Joseph E. Maddy
- Tremaine Cottage – named after Charles Tremaine and family, arts administrator
- Canfield Cottage – named after Leila Canfield and family, one of Interlochens first board members
- Greenleaf Cottage – named after Leland Greenleaf and family, of Greenleaf Instruments
- Bonbright Cottage – named after Della Bonbright and family
- Nesbitt Cottage – named after the Nesbitt family
- Frolich House – named after Edward Frolich and family
- Dow Guest Suites – named after the Dow family

== Sustainability ==
In 2019, Interlochen Center for the Arts was recognized by the US Department of Education as a Green Ribbon School, making progress in the areas of sustainability, environmental impact reduction, and the health and well-being of its staff and students. Interlochen is committed to creating and enacting a Climate Action Plan that places emphasis on learning and engagement, sustainable operations, and buildings and operations. Interlochen uses green solar energy, and has charging stations for vehicles on campus, water-bottle filling stations, and uses local and regional foods.

Interlochen has a botanical lab and community garden, with permaculture, an orchard, native plants, mushrooms, poly tunnels and raised beds, chickens, aquaponics and a honeybee apiary.

Interlochen has industrial compost facilities built in 2019. The compost facility processes tons of food waste in combination with dried leaves and woodchips that are collected each year on campus during fall leaf pickup and chipped, downed branches and trees. The compost is used on campus.

== Awards and accolades ==
In 2006, Interlochen Center for the Arts was named recipient of the National Medal of Arts from then-president George W. Bush.

In 2021, Interlochen Center for the Arts became the 14th musical organization inducted into the American Classical Music Hall of Fame.

Former Interlochen students are recipients of some of the top arts industry awards in the world, with the Center's alumni receiving 29 Emmy Awards, 158 Grammy Awards, 36 Tony Awards, and Jimmy Awards. More than 50 Interlochen students have been recognized as Presidential Scholars in the Arts, more than 700 YoungArts Winners, hundreds of students earn recognition as Scholastic Winners in Art & Writing, as well as several other prestigious competitions and programs. Interlochen alumni Mary Oliver, Tom Kitt, George Crumb, Beverly Gage, and Margo Jefferson, have received the Pulitzer Prize, as well as over a dozen finalists.

In 2024, Interlochen Public Radio's podcast Points North earned recognition from the national Edward R. Murrow Award, which recognized the podcast's excellence in journalism.

In 2025, Niche recognized Interlochen as the #1 best high school for the arts in the nation.

Interlochen's Sustainability Department has earned numerous awards and recognitions, including Michigan Green Schools, US Department of Education Green Ribbon Schools, and holds certificates with Certified Naturally Grown, USDA People's Garden, Michigan Agricultural Environmental Program, and more.

== Gallery ==
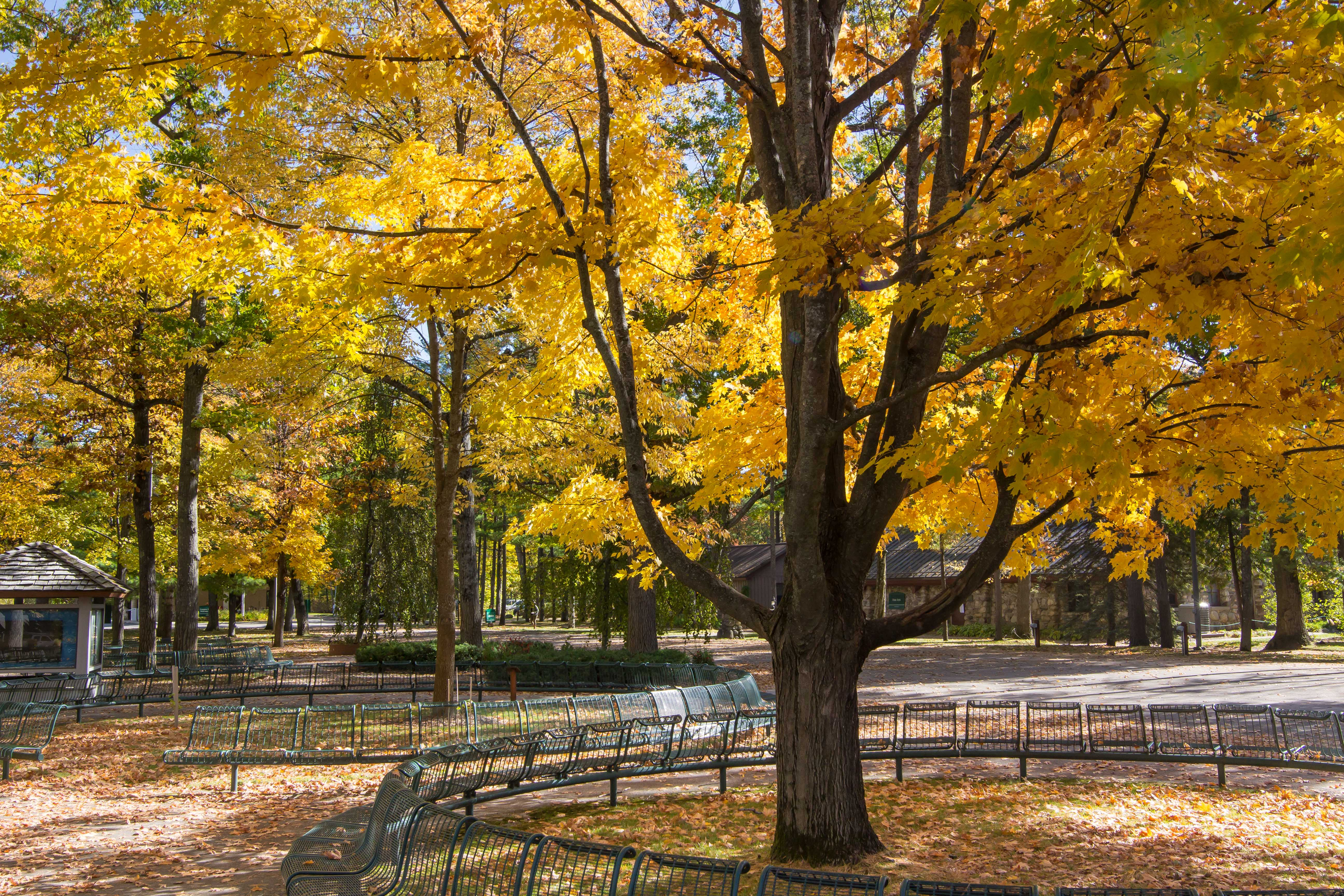
The Osterlin Mall

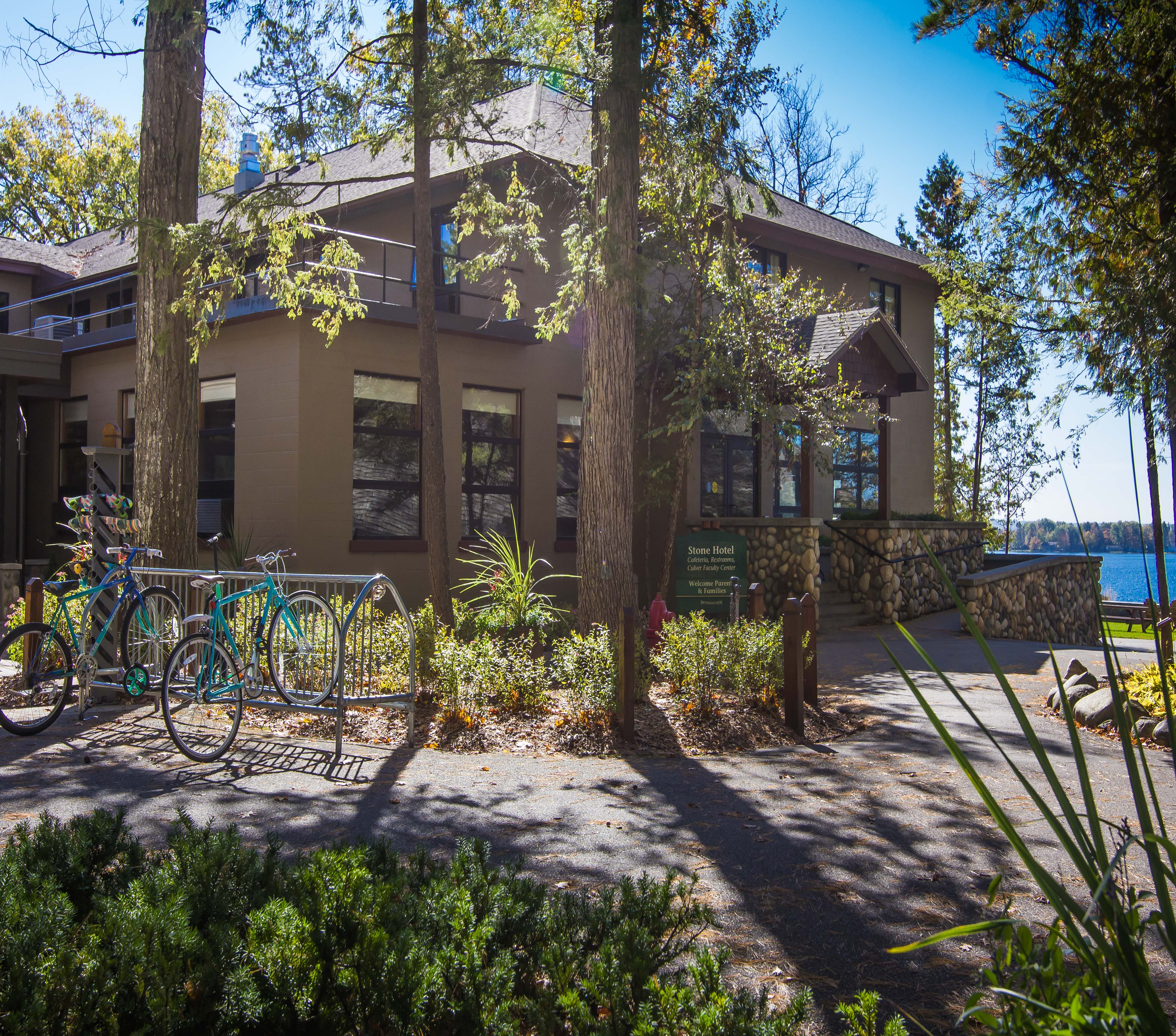
The Stone Hotel overlooking Green Lake

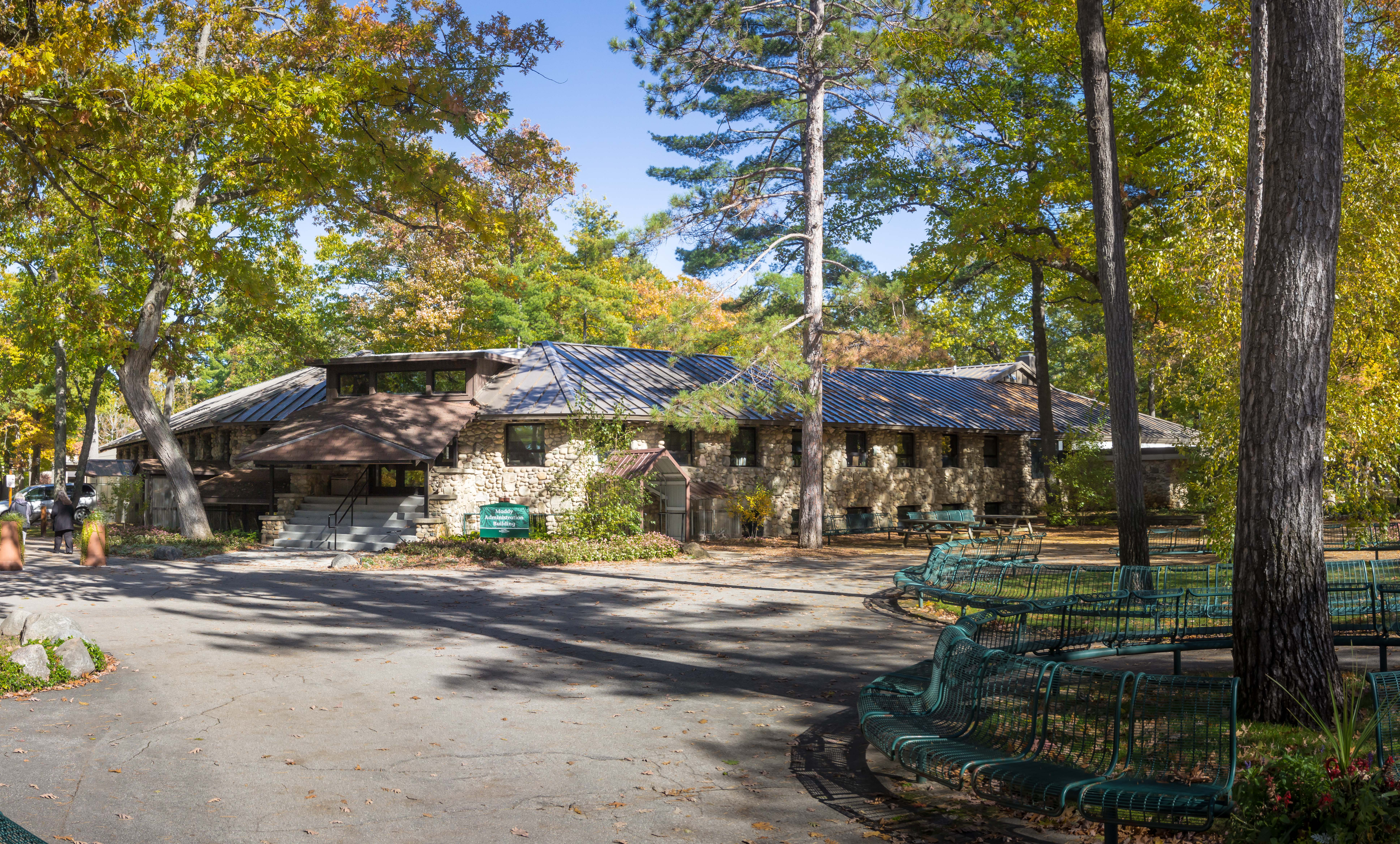
The Maddy Administration Building

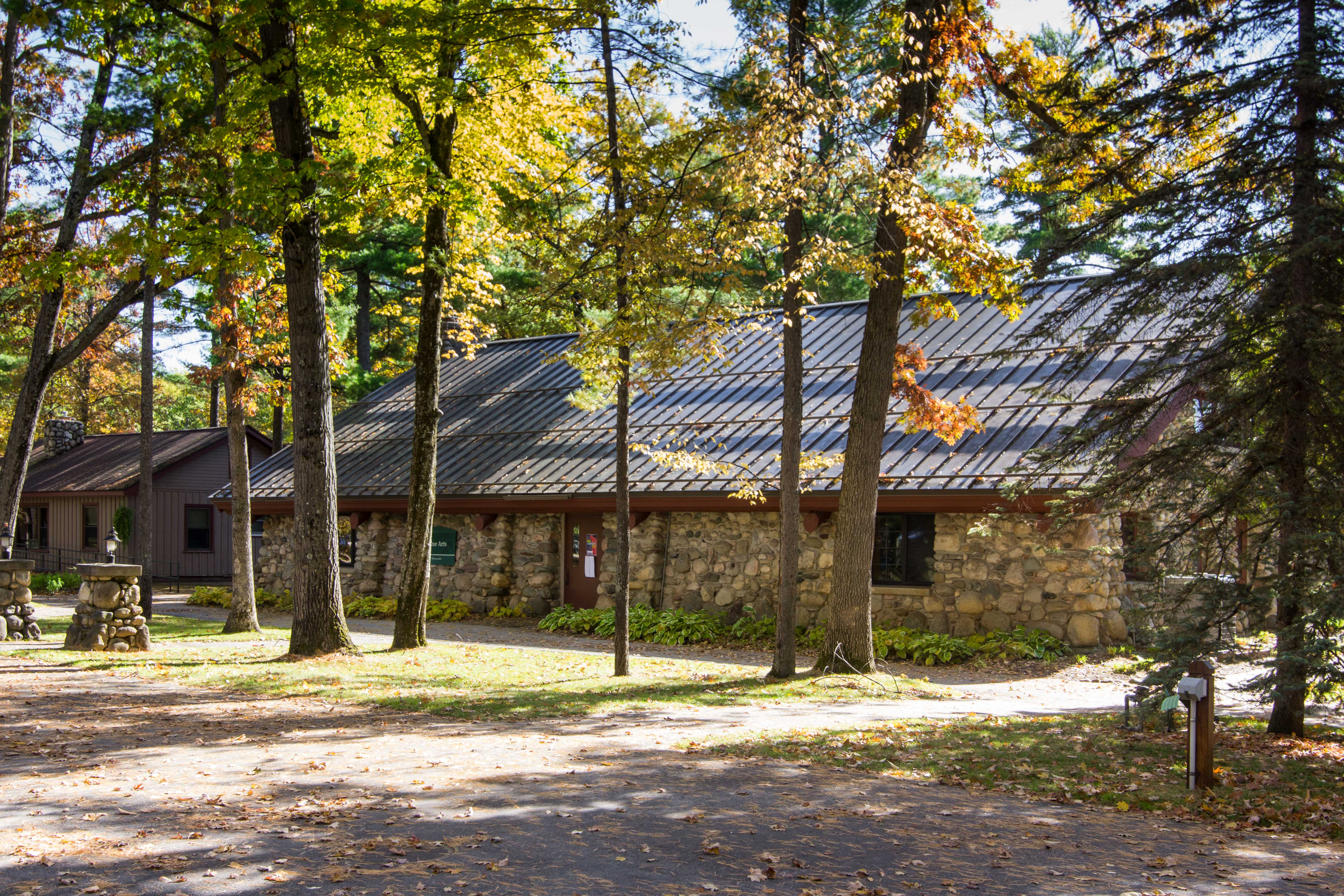
The Fine Arts Building in 2018

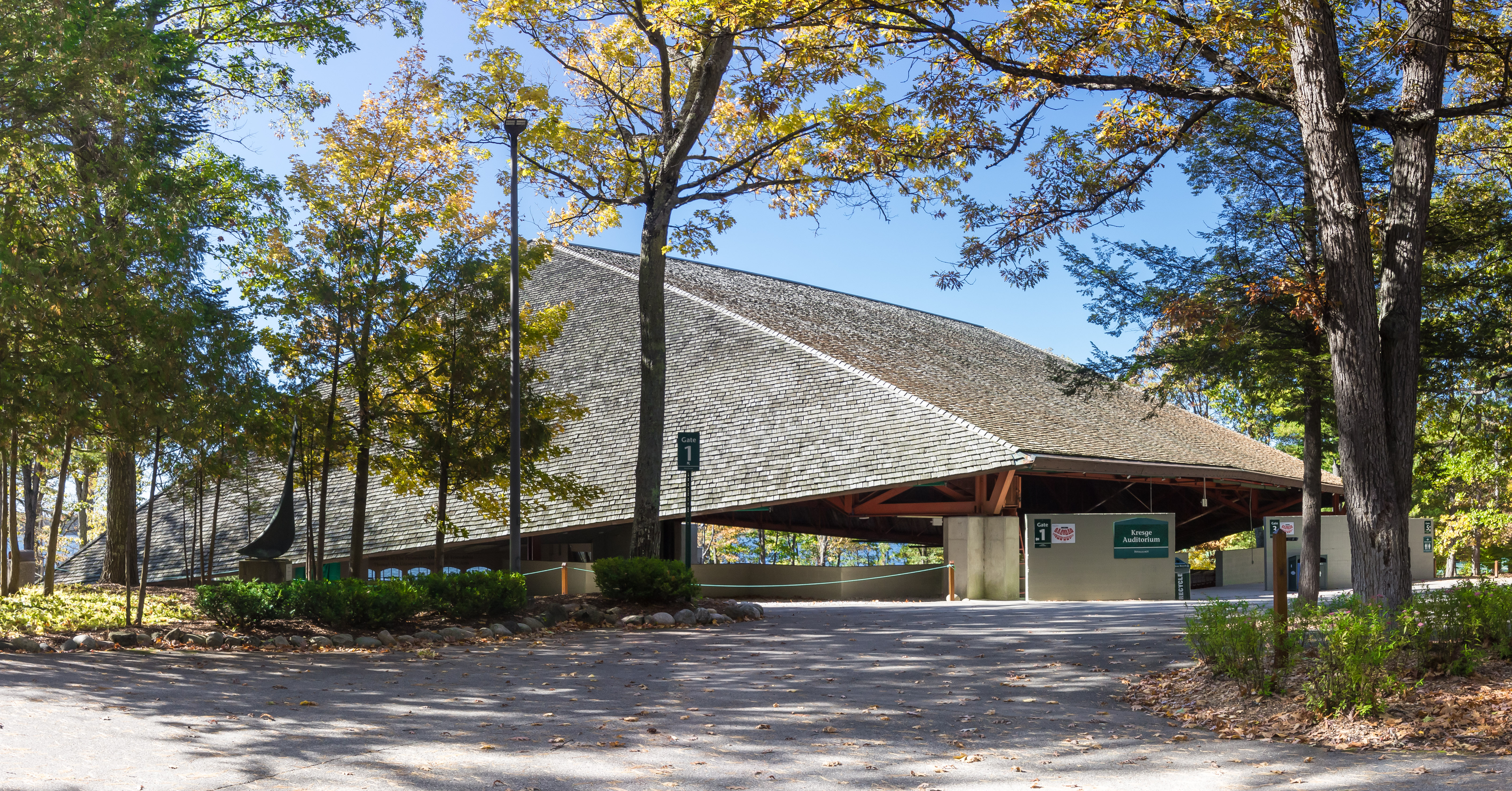
Interlochen's Kresge Auditorium, an open-air amphitheater, named for S. S. Kresge

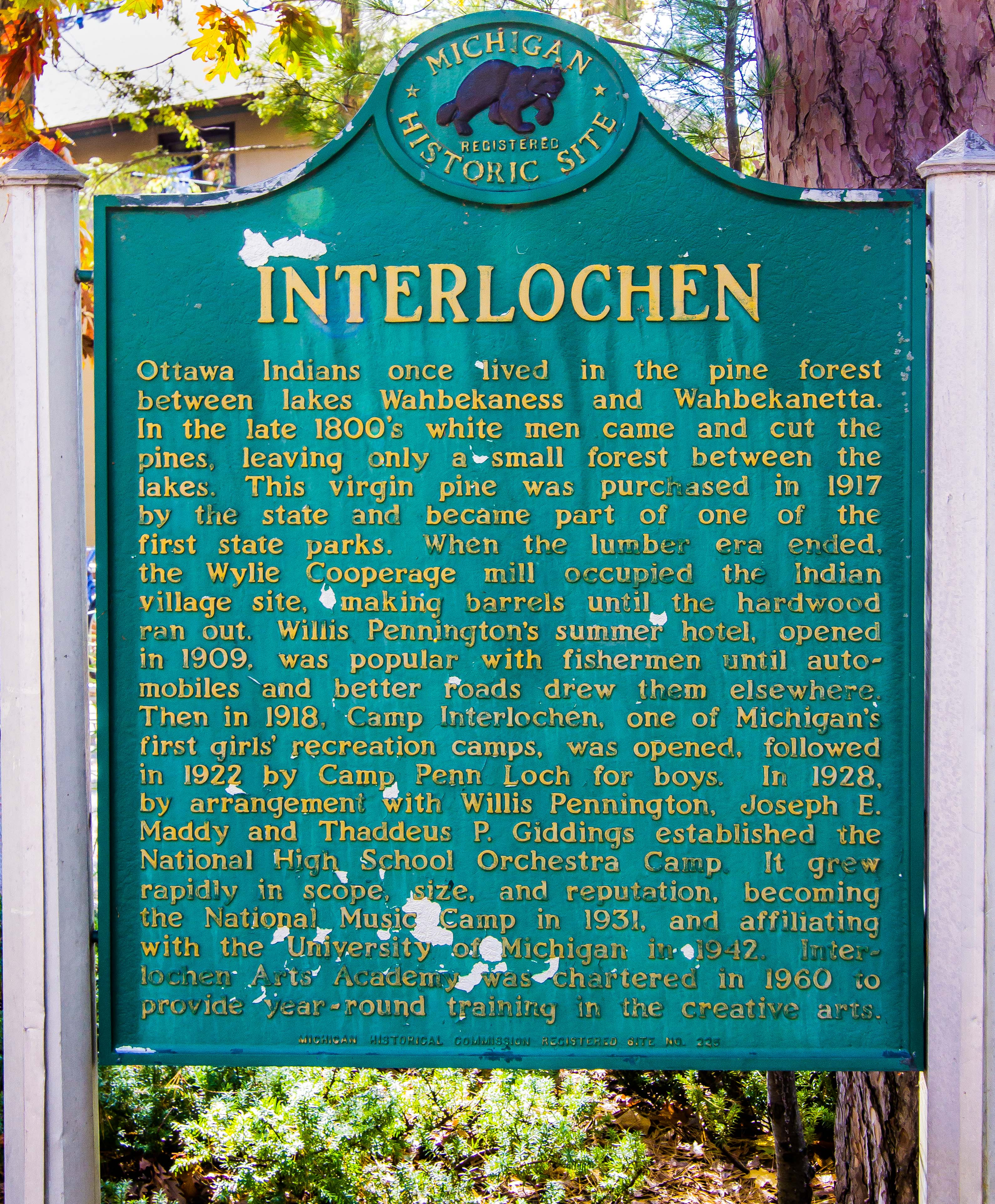
Interlochen historical marker

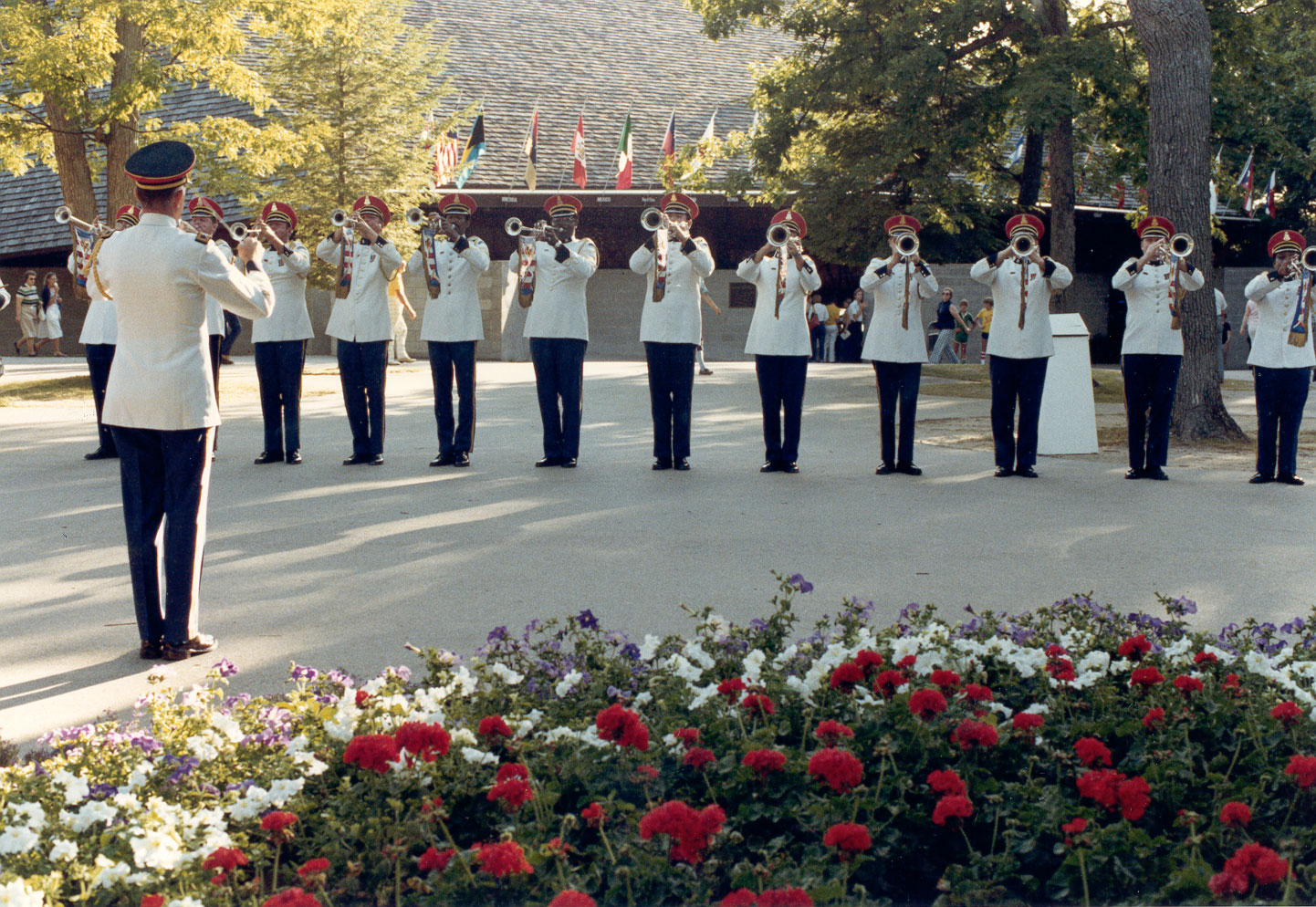
United States Army Herald Trumpets at Interlochen in 2010

== Controversies ==
Sex traffickers Jeffrey Epstein and Ghislaine Maxwell used the summer camp to find underage girls according to the United States Department of Justice. Epstein had attended Interlochen summer camp in 1967, when he was a teenaged bassoon player. Beginning in 1990, Epstein donated more than USD $400,000 to Interlochen. Contributions ended by 2008 when the relationship was terminated.

In 2024, Interlochen hired a law firm to investigate reports that staff and faculty sexually abused students. The investigation's scope was expanded to include Jeffrey Epstein's activities. They found 70 accounts of sexual conduct by 47 faculty and staff members, spanning from the 1950s through the 2010s. Interlochen posted the full report on their website.

== Notable alumni ==
- Dan Amboyer – actor
- Maude Apatow – actress
- Michael Arden – singer, actor, and director
- Meredith Baxter – actress
- Jeanne Baxtresser – flutist
- Nadia Bjorlin – actress, model and singer
- Ron Blake – saxophonist, band leader, and composer
- Stuart Bogie – clarinetist
- Garrett Borns – musician
- Caleb Burhans – composer, singer, and multi-instrumentalist
- Kira Bursky – filmmaker
- David Burtka – actor and chef
- Bruno Campos – actor
- Charlie Carver – actor
- Angelin Chang – pianist
- Victoria Clark – singer and actress
- Kat Coiro – writer and director
- Terry Crews – actor and pro football player
- George Crumb – composer
- John Dalley – violinist
- Zach Dean – screenwriter, film producer
- Michael Delp – writer
- Aaron Diehl – pianist
- Eldar Djangirov – pianist
- Elaine Douvas – musician
- Aaron Dworkin – violinist and music educator
- Doriot Anthony Dwyer – flutist
- Jennifer Ehle – actress
- Jeffrey Epstein – financier and serial rapist
- Peter Erskine – drummer
- Laura Escudé – musician
- Damon Evans – actor
- Tovah Feldshuh – actress
- María del Mar Fernández – actress
- Jack Ferver – dancer, choreographer, and actor
- Anna Fidler – artist
- Barrett Foa – actor
- Ben Foster – actor
- Amy Fote – dancer
- Ana Gasteyer – actress
- Lora Lee Gayer – actress
- Delta David Gier – conductor
- Marshall Gilkes – trombonist
- Vince Gilligan – producer and screenwriter
- Kimiko Glenn – actress and singer
- Jesse Green – theatre critic
- Garth Greenwell – novelist
- Josh Groban – singer-songwriter and record producer
- Keitaro Harada – conductor
- Wendell B. Harris Jr. – filmmaker
- David Hattner – clarinetist and conductor
- Bob Havens – big band and jazz musician
- Steve Hayden – advertising executive
- Christie Hefner – publishing executive
- Ed Helms – actor
- Evan Helmuth – actor
- Anne Hills – singer-songwriter
- Marya Hornbacher – author
- Ema Horvath – actress
- Felicity Huffman – actress
- Alexandra Ashley Hughes – singer-songwriter
- Tom Hulce – actor
- Linda Hunt – actress
- Carol Jantsch – tuba player
- Aaron M. Johnson – saxophonist and bandleader
- Bruce Johnston – singer-songwriter
- Scott Joiner – singer and composer
- Norah Jones – singer-songwriter
- Kim Kashkashian – violist
- Ani Kavafian – violinist
- Ida Kavafian – violinist
- Celia Keenan-Bolger – actress
- Jewel Kilcher – singer
- Amelia Kinkade – actress
- Elizabeth Koch – oboist
- Yolanda Kondonassis – harpist
- Norman Korpi – filmmaker
- Damian Kulash – musician
- Dane Laffrey – scenic designer
- Naomi Lang – ice dancer
- Terry Lavitz – keyboardist, composer, and producer
- Soyeon Kate Lee – pianist
- Vella Lovell – actress
- Michael Lowenstern – musician and composer
- Jennifer Chambers Lynch – director
- Lorin Maazel – conductor, violinist, composer, and former child prodigy
- Elizabeth Marvel – actress
- Dmitri Matheny – musician
- Reed Mathis – bassist
- Noel Maxam – director
- Timothy McAllister – saxophonist and educator
- Anthony McGill – clarinetist
- Michael McMillian – actor
- Meatball, drag queen
- Ava Mendoza – guitarist
- Alexander J. Michaels – drag queen
- Mia Michaels – choreographer
- Aleksandar Miljković – musician
- Eric Millegan – actor
- Bob Mintzer – saxophonist
- Ross Mintzer – musician, singer‑songwriter, and bandleader
- Dermot Mulroney – actor
- Mark Nadler – musician and comedian
- Conlon Nancarrow – composer
- Jaime Ray Newman – actress
- John Newsom – painter
- Tim Nordwind – musician
- Jessye Norman – opera singer
- Holly O'Brien – actress
- Mary Oliver – author and poet
- Our Lady J – television writer, pianist, singer-songwriter
- Larry Page – businessman
- Elizabeth Parcells – coloratura soprano
- Ashley Park – actress
- Donovan Patton – actor
- Sarah Pidgeon – actress
- Samuel Pilafian – tubist
- Susan Poser – academic administrator
- William Preucil – violinist
- Nathaniel Mary Quinn – painter
- Da'Vine Joy Randolph – actress
- Nelson Rangell – musician
- Anthony Rapp – actor
- Jackson Rathbone – actor
- Julieanna Richardson – lawyer and historian
- Chappell Roan – singer-songwriter
- Hadley Robinson – actress
- Victor Salvi – harpist
- Lois Schaefer – piccolo soloist
- Tom Sharpe – drummer
- Bill Sherwood – musician, screenwriter and film director
- David Shifrin – clarinetist
- Trish Sie – director
- Dick Siegel – singer-songwriter
- Alexandra Silber – actress
- Jessica Sklar – mathematician
- Steven Skybell – actor
- Peter Sparling – dancer, choreographer, writer, video artist and painter
- Peter Sprague – guitarist
- Doug Stanton – author
- Sufjan Stevens – singer-songwriter
- Casey Stratton – singer-songwriter
- Byron Stripling – trumpeter
- Cheryl Studer – dramatic soprano
- Francie Swift – actress
- Jamii Szmadzinski – electric violinist
- Kenneth Tarver – operatic tenor
- Christopher Taylor – Mayor of Ann Arbor (2014–2026)
- Vanessa Taylor – screenwriter
- Roger Thomas – interior designer
- Michael Thurber – composer
- Randal Turner – operatic baritone
- Stoll Vaughan – singer-songwriter
- Rufus Wainwright – singer-songwriter
- Benjamin Walker – actor
- Mike Wallace – television journalist
- Orion Weiss – pianist
- Betty Who – musician
- Kit Williamson – actor and filmmaker
- Rumer Willis – actress
- Luke Winslow-King – guitarist
- Jill Winternitz – actress
- Peter Yarrow – singer
- Sean Young – actress

== Faculty and guest artists ==
- Lauren Bernofsky – composer
- Allen Britton – educator
- Margaret Brouwer – composer
- Van Cliburn – pianist, 1961–2007
- Roderick Cox – conductor
- George Crumb – composer, 1957, 1958, and 1961
- Albert Austin Harding – director of bands
- Leslie B. Dunner – director of academy orchestras
- Richard Ellsasser – organist and composer
- Percy Grainger – composer and pianist, on faculty 1930–1944
- Louis Langrée – conductor
- Cecil Leeson – saxophonist
- Howard Hanson – composer and conductor, visiting conductor 1928–1931; composed the "Interlochen Theme", which was later used in his Symphony No.2
- Marie Hartwig – camp counselor
- John S. Hilliard – composer
- Milt Jackson – jazz vibraphonist
- Jerry Junkin – conductor
- Dennis Kim – violinist
- Homer Keller – composer
- Casey Kriechbaum – composer
- Yo Yo Ma – cellist who embarked on national tour with orchestra
- Joseph E. Maddy – conductor and music educator, founder of the academy
- Gary Lee Nelson – composer
- William Chapman Nyaho – pianist, current faculty
- Jung-Ho Pak – conductor, director of orchestras since 2003
- Itzhak Perlman – violinist, 1989–1995
- Vincent Pezzi – bassoonist
- Susan Poser – administrator
- John Philip Sousa – conductor and composer
- Daniel Stolper – oboist, visited 1972
- Chris Thile – singer-songwriter
- Carolyn Watson – conductor, director of orchestras since 2013
- Paul W. Whear – composer
- Jerome Wiesner – electrical engineer

== See also ==
- Cranbrook Schools – Private school in Bloomfield Hills, Michigan, US
