= Leonid Hambro =

American musician (1920–2006)

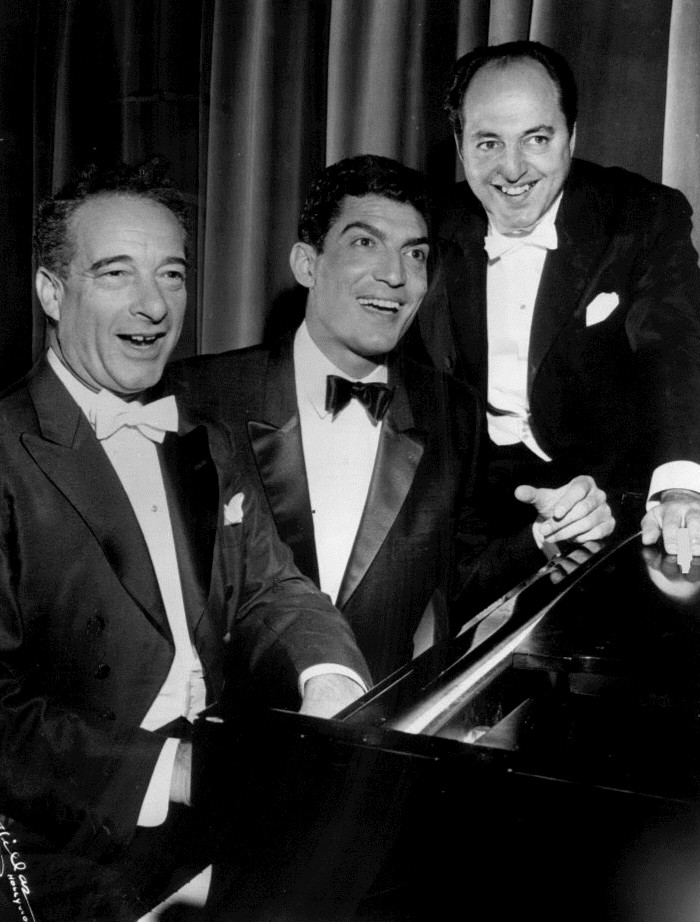
- Victor Borge, Sergio Franchi and Leonid Hambro.
- Born: June 26, 1920; Chicago
- Died: October 23, 2006 (aged 86); New York City
- Occupation(s): American concert pianist and composer

Leonid Hambro (June 26, 1920 – October 23, 2006) was an American concert pianist and composer.

== Life ==
Hambro was born in Chicago, the son of immigrant Lithuanian Jews; his father was a pianist accompanying silent films.

He studied at the Juilliard School, and won First Prize at the National Naumburg Competition in 1946. He was the musical sidekick of pianist and humorist Victor Borge for ten years, from 1961 to 1969, and occasionally performed with Borge throughout the remainder of Borge's career. In 1970 he became the Head of the Piano Department of the California Institute of the Arts, in Santa Clarita, California, and Assistant Dean of the School of Music, holding these posts until 1992.

Hambro was Artist in Residence of the Aspen Institute and the official pianist of radio WQXR, New York. He played with the P. D. Q. Bach performances and the Hoffnung Musical Spoof Concerts. He published with Jascha Zayde The Complete Pianist (Ludlow Music Inc., New York). He also composed the piano piece Happy Birthday Dear Ludwig, a set of five variations on "Happy Birthday to You" in the style of many famous Beethoven pieces such as Minuet in G, Sonata Pathétique, Moonlight Sonata, Für Elise, and the Fifth Symphony.

Hambro released two albums on Cook Records, currently operated by Smithsonian Folkways. They were entitled A Perspective of Beethoven-Pianoforte and Cook's Tour of High Fidelity, and released in 1953 and 1965, respectively. He also recorded "Switched-On Gershwin", a duo album of Hambro's classical piano, blended with the Moog synthesizer of Gershon Kingsley, for AVCO Records in 1970. With Victor Borge Hambro played persiflages on well-known pianopieces like Chopins Minute Waltz.

On December 22, 2003, he entertained the members of the New York Atheists Inc. at their first annual NYC Atheists Solstice Dinner and Party at the Hunan 5th Avenue Restaurant. He claimed to have been born an atheist and to have never belonged to any congregation throughout his life. He died in New York City, aged 86.
