= Lois Schaefer =

American flutist and piccoloist (1924–2020)

Lois Elizabeth Schaefer (1924–2020) was an American flutist and piccoloist. From Yakima, Washington, Schaefer dedicated her education and career to playing the flute. Most notably, she spent the majority of her career as principal flute and piccolo of the Boston Symphony Orchestra. Schaefer sat on the board of the National Flute Association as well as being a faculty member of the New England Conservatory of Music. Her decades-long music legacy made her a trailblazing musician for women and contributed to the success of BSO's flute section.

== Early life and education ==
Lois Elizabeth Schaefer was born on March 10, 1924, in Yakima, Washington to Charles Frederick Schaefer and Mary Elizabeth Wherry. Charles Frederick Schaefer was a fruit industry broker while Mary Elizabeth Wherry was a school teacher and notably taught her daughters piano. Schaefer had one sister, Winfred Mayes (1919 - 2020), who was known for her cellist career.

Schaefer began playing the flute in elementary school. Because Yakima did not have any flute teachers available to Schaefer at the time, she was mostly self-taught. As a teenager, Schaefer attended the Summer Arts Camp at Interlochen Center for the Arts where she was the first of 27 flutists. She then attended the New England Conservatory of Music. While in college, she studied under Georges Laurent, known for his principal flutist position in the BSO, as well as Frank Horsfall, and Sebastian Caratelli. She received a bachelor's degree in flute performance in 1946 and completed an artist diploma a year later.

== Professional music career ==
In 1951, Schaefer was hired as the assistant principal flutist for the Chicago Symphony Orchestra by Rafael Kubelík. She held this position for three years. During this time, she also taught at the Chicago Musical College.

From 1956 to 1965, Schaefer was the principal flute in the New York City Opera. She also performed with the NBC Opera Theatre Orchestra, the RCA Victor Symphony Orchestra, and the Columbia Symphony Orchestra during this time.

Schaefer then became Boston Symphony Orchestra's flute and principal piccolo in 1965. Upon hiring, she was one of four women in the BSO. Schaefer referred to this position as her “dream job”, and stayed with the BSO for 25 years. She was the principal piccolo for the Boston Pops Orchestra during this time as well, in which she led the piccolo obbligato in “The Starts and Stripes Forever” over 2,000 times. Schaefer was also a faculty member at her alma mater (NEC) from 1965 to 1992, as well as a board member of the National Flute Association, where she received a Lifetime Achievement Award in 1993.

== Retirement and death ==
In 1990, Schaefer retired from her principal piccolo position. She lived with her sister in Arizona before the two of them moved to Sequim, Washington. During retirement, she spent time traveling in Africa, Costa Rica, Ecuador, the Galapagos Islands, and Machu Picchu, among others. Schaefer especially enjoyed hiking Mount Rainier and Mount St. Helens and gardening. On January 31, 2020, Schaefer died of chronic obstructive pulmonary disease in her Sequim home. She was 95 years old.
