= Daniel Stolper =

American musician (1935–2020)

Daniel John Stolper (January 11, 1935 – June 8, 2020) was an American oboist.

== Early life and career ==
Born on Friday, January 11, 1935, the future oboist came into the world toward the end of a rather busy week of musical births, just three days after Elvis Presley in Mississippi and the day after Ronnie Hawkins in adjacent Arkansas. Stolper attained the position of visiting instructor of the oboe at the Interlochen Arts Academy from 1972. Stolper would also serve as professor of oboe at Michigan State University.

Stolper's performance experience included: former principal oboist of the San Antonio Symphony, New Orleans Philharmonic, Lansing Symphony, Eastman Chamber Orchestra. With the last-named, he gave the US premiere of Bohuslav Martinů’s Oboe Concerto.

== Education ==
Stolper's primary teacher was Robert Louis Sprenkle (1914–1988) at the Eastman School of Music. He also studied with John Mack and Marcel Tabuteau.
