= WIAA (FM) =

Coordinates: 44.2758°N 85.7137°W

- Interlochen, Michigan; United States
- Broadcast area: Cadillac-Traverse City
- Frequency: 88.7 MHz
- Branding: Classical IPR

Programming
- Format: Public radio; Classical
- Affiliations: NPR

Ownership
- Owner: Interlochen Center for the Arts

History
- First air date: 1963 (at 88.3)
- Former frequencies: 88.3 MHz (1963–1989)
- Call sign meaning: Interlochen Arts Academy

Technical information
- Licensing authority: FCC
- Facility ID: 28887
- Class: C0
- ERP: 100,000 watts
- HAAT: 315 meters (1,033 ft)
- Translator: 94.7 W234BU (Traverse City)

Links
- Public license information: Public file; LMS
- Webcast: Listen live
- Website: Classical IPR Online

WIAA (88.7 FM) is a radio station in Interlochen, Michigan. The station is owned by Interlochen Center for the Arts, and is the flagship of Interlochen Public Radio's "Classical IPR" network, consisting of classical music and hourly news updates from NPR.

== History ==
WIAA is the flagship station of the IPR Music Radio network, and began broadcasting in 1963 at 88.3 FM. Interlochen Center founder Joe Maddy had long dreamed of bringing a fine arts station to Northern Michigan, in part as a way to increase exposure to performances at the National Music Camp (now Interlochen Arts Camp). WIAA was a charter member of NPR.

In 1989, WIAA moved from 88.3 FM at 115,000 watts to 88.7 FM at 100,000 watts. WIAA's signal covers a large portion of northwestern and west-central lower Michigan, from Howard City to Gaylord and beyond.

Interlochen Center for the Arts acquired and launched sister station WICA in 2000 to feature a news- and talk-oriented format, and since that time WIAA and its two satellites (WICV and WIAB) have devoted almost all of their broadcast schedule to classical music and have not aired NPR news shows such as "Morning Edition" and "All Things Considered", although they do feature hourly news updates from NPR. NPR news shows are, however, available over a portion of IPR Music Radio's listening area on CMU Public Radio, and within the coverage areas of the IPR News Radio stations (see below).

WICA programming is also heard in on WLMN Manistee, Michigan and on WHBP Harbor Springs, Michigan. WIAA also formerly operated a translator station in Traverse City, W264AC (100.7 FM), meant to fill in dead spots in the main signal's coverage in Traverse City; this translator went off the air in 2000.

Studios for WIAA and other Interlochen Public Radio stations have always been located on the Interlochen Center for the Arts campus in Interlochen, Michigan.
