= Jascha Zayde =

American classical composer

Jascha Zayde (October 25, 1911 – September 3, 1999) was an American pianist, composer, and conductor. From the 1930s, he was the first staff musician hired by WQXR. From 1954, he was the staff keyboard player of the New York City Ballet.
