= Bruce Wolosoff =

- Born: Bruce Germont; March 27, 1955 (age 71); New York City, US
- Occupations: Composer, pianist, and educator
- Spouse: Margaret Garrett
- Children: 2
- Website: brucewolosoff.com

Bruce Wolosoff (born March 27, 1955) is an American classical composer, pianist, and educator. He lives in Shelter Island, New York with his wife, the artist Margaret Garrett. He has two daughters, the singer-songwriter Juliet Garrett and the sculptor and mixed media artist Katya Wolosoff.

== Biography ==
Wolosoff was born Bruce Germont, the son of Jeanette (née Rothenberg) and Marc Germont. After his father's death when Wolosoff was five years old, his mother remarried to Alvin Bibbs Wolosoff.

As a teenager, Wolosoff played in a variety of rock bands while pursuing studies in classical piano performance. He received a B.A. at Bard College, where he studied with Joan Tower and ran an improvisational group with multi-instrumentalist and composer Elliott Sharp, and an M.M. in piano performance from the New England Conservatory of Music in Boston. It was at the New England Conservatory that he met jazz composer-pianist Jaki Byard, an artist who exerted enormous influence on Wolosoff’s musical development.

Wolosoff studied composition and orchestration with Lawrence Widdoes, and pursued post-graduate studies at the Dalcroze School of Music with Dr. Hilda Schuster. Wolosoff’s principal piano instructor was German Diez, who taught the technique of Claudio Arrau. Other teachers have included Evelyne Crochet, Richard Goode, Jorge Bolet, and Charlie Banacos.

After graduating from New England Conservatory, Wolosoff moved back to New York City and began his career as a pianist. His debut recital earned a glowing review from music critic Tim Page, then writing for The New York Times, who wrote that "Mr. Wolosoff is an artist with ideas. He combines keen musical insight with a prismatic sense of tonal color." Wolosoff gave the world premieres for a number of piano works dedicated to him, including compositions by Daron Hagen and Richard Danielpour; he premiered Danielpour's Piano Concerto No. 2 under the direction of Joann Falletta. In 1986, the Music and Arts Programs of America released Wolosoff's debut recording as a pianist, featuring the works of Ferruccio Busoni.

In 1988, Wolosoff organized an 80th birthday tribute to Olivier Messiaen at Lincoln Center’s Alice Tully Hall. It was soon after this that Wolosoff abandoned public performance for many years in order to devote himself more fully to composition. In his early career, Wolosoff was commissioned by the Greenwich Village Orchestra, the Lark Quartet, recorder player Michala Petri, and the 20th Century Consort (now the 21st Century Consort), the resident ensemble of the Smithsonian Institution consisting of musicians from the National Symphony Orchestra.

A devotee of blues and jazz, Wolosoff initially enjoyed those genres privately while he composed and played classical music. In 2000 he began bringing blues and jazz into his compositions, the first being "Blues for the New Millennium" which debuted at the Hirshhorn Museum in Washington, D.C., in January 2001.

Wolosoff began receiving wider acclaim as a composer with the release of “Songs Without Words” on Naxos American Classics, a collection of 18 divertimenti performed by the Carpe Diem String Quartet. Additional commissions have come from ETHEL, for whom he composed the electric string quartet “The Wanderer’s Tale” and the Eroica Trio. In 2007 he led the Columbus Symphony Orchestra in a performance of his “Sinfonia” as part of their Bach & Beyond Festival. Wolosoff’s chamber opera “Madimi,” with a libretto by the late Michael Hall, was premiered in 2007 at Symphony Space in New York City by the Center for Contemporary Opera. Another opera, “The Great Good Thing,” with a libretto by Debbie Danielpour based on the young adult novel by Roderick Townley, was workshopped by operamission in 2014.

Wolosoff returned to the concert stage as a pianist after a hiatus of 19 years, performing his own music. In 2011, he released the live concert album “Many Worlds,” featuring several of his works for solo piano. The title track, “Many Worlds,” was dedicated to his teacher Jaki Byard. In 2019, he performed sections from a work-in-progress, “Scenes from the Odyssey,” written for piano, electric cello, and rock band at Guild Hall of East Hampton in New York.

In more recent years, Wolosoff has composed in response to visual art and through collaborations with leading artists across a variety of disciplines. He collaborated with the late choreographer Ann Reinking on three ballets. The White City, based on Erik Larsen’s The Devil in the White City and made in partnership with Melissa Thodos of Thodos Dance Chicago, enjoyed a two-season tour around the country and rave critical reviews: the Chicago Sun-Times named it “Best Dance of 2011.” A Light in the Dark, inspired by the lives of Helen Keller and Ann Sullivan, was nominated for a Chicago/Midwest Emmy Award in Outstanding Achievement for Arts/Entertainment Programming. The Chicago Sun-Times described the production as “a feast for the senses,” Dance Magazine as “masterful,” and the Chicago Stage Standard as having “the hallmarks of an instant classic.” Wolosoff wrote, performed, and recorded the music for Darkling, I Listen, an album of solo piano music that Reinking was set to use in a new ballet based on the life of John Keats.

The Montage Music Society released the album “Creating Music Inspired by Visual Art” in 2019 featuring chamber music by Wolosoff. It included the works “for April,” a piece for piano and cello inspired by the charcoal drawings of April Gornik, performed by Wolosoff and cellist Sara Sant’Ambrogio of the Eroica Trio. April Gornik included the work as a digital download in her book April Gornik: Drawings, published by FigureGround Press. The album also included “The Astronomer’s Key,” a piano quartet informed by the artwork of Milton Resnick and commissioned by the Roswell Artists-in-Residence Program in honor of their 50th anniversary. The Eroica Trio commissioned a third work, “The Loom,” inspired by the watercolors of Eric Fischl. The release of “Creating Music Inspired by Visual Art” featured a documentary about the project by filmmaker Vincent Stenerson.

Other interdisciplinary collaborations have included composing music for short films by the artist (and Wolosoff’s wife) Margaret Garrett, including Elegy, made in response to the coronavirus pandemic, and the short dance film Cuneiform, which premiered at Houston’s Frame x Frame Film Fest in 2019. He wrote “Night Paintings” for pianist Blair McMillen, inspired by paintings by Margaret Garrett, Vincent van Gogh, Eduard Munch, and David Salle. In a recurring project with the Pilobolus dance company and New York Academy of Art, Wolosoff improvises on the piano with dancers while they are drawn in real time.

Wolosoff’s “Concerto for Cello and Orchestra,” written for Sara Sant’Ambrogio, was recorded by the Royal Philharmonic Orchestra under the baton of Grzegorz Nowak. The commercial release in 2019 made the Billboard Top 10 Classical Albums Chart. Critic Jerry Dubins of Fanfare Magazine described the concerto as one of “compelling beauty” that “can be declared an instant masterpiece.” More recently, Wolosoff was selected as one of the composers commissioned by cellist Inbal Segev for her “20 for 2020” project; “Lacrymae,” for cello choir, was released as the single for that project. Other recent projects include a recording of two cello sonatas, “Paradise Found” and “Requiem for the Planet,” for Avie Records with cellist Sara Sant’Ambrogio, and a double concerto for violinist Michael Guttman and cellist Jing Zhao.

In 2020, Wolosoff was named artistic director of Reflections in Music, a concert series that pairs chamber music performances with presentations of art across a variety of disciplines.

Wolosoff has maintained a private teaching studio since 1968. For eight years, he was a visiting artist at the Hayground School in Bridgehampton, New York, where he launched an orchestra of young composers, most of whom had no previous formal music training, in which students performed and conducted each other’s music.
