= Jonathan Leshnoff =

American composer (born 1973)

Jonathan Leshnoff (born September 8, 1973) is an American classical music composer.

== Early life and education ==
Jonathan Leshnoff was born in New Brunswick, New Jersey to Susan and Steven Leshnoff; his mother was an artist, and his father an engineer. For his undergraduate studies, Leshnoff attended Johns Hopkins University and Peabody Conservatory concurrently, earning bachelor's degrees in Anthropology and Music Composition, respectively. He went on to receive a Master’s of Music from Peabody, then received his Doctorate of Music from the University of Maryland. Leshnoff was raised observing Conservative Judaism. During his student years at Johns Hopkins, he delved deeper into his beliefs and began to practice Orthodox Judaism.

== Career ==
Leshnoff lives in Baltimore, Maryland, where he composes and is a professor of music at Towson University. He has composed scores of works, including four string quartets, four oratorios, twelve concerti, and four symphonies. His compositions have been performed by more than eighty orchestras worldwide including the Atlanta Symphony Orchestra, Baltimore Symphony Orchestra, Dallas Symphony Orchestra, Kansas City Symphony, Nashville Symphony Orchestra, Philadelphia Orchestra, and Pittsburgh Symphony Orchestra, among many others. Leshnoff's compositions have also been premiered by soloists including violinist Gil Shaham, violist Roberto Díaz, cellist Johannes Moser, guitarist Manuel Barrueco, and pianist Joyce Yang.

Notable recent commissions include his Clarinet Concerto (2015), the oratorio Zohar (2015), the Violin Concerto No. 2 (2017), and his 2019 Piano Concerto. The Clarinet Concerto was jointly commissioned by the Philadelphia Orchestra and the Santa Barbara Symphony Orchestra, and premiered in April 2016 in Philadelphia with principal clarinetist Ricardo Morales under Music Director Yannick Nézet-Séguin. Zohar was co-commissioned by Carnegie Hall and the Atlanta Symphony Orchestra, premiered under conductor Robert Spano in April 2016, and subsequently recorded by that ensemble. The Dallas Symphony Orchestra and Harrisburg Symphony Orchestra co-commissioned Leshnoff’s second violin concerto, and Dallas premiered the work featuring soloist Alexander Kerr in May 2018 at Jaap van Zweden's final concert as music director of that orchestra. It has since been recorded by Noah Bendix-Balgley and the Oklahoma City Philharmonic on a 2023 Naxos album. In November 2019, Joyce Yang premiered his Piano Concerto with the Kansas City Symphony and Music Director Michael Stern; it was subsequently released on the Reference Recordings label.

While a large portion of his work is orchestral, Leshnoff has composed for many chamber ensembles and symphonic bands. The United States Marine Band commissioned a Symphony for Winds to mark the 225th anniversary of that ensemble in 2023; it had previously recorded a transcription of Leshnoff's Clarinet Concerto on its 2017 album Arioso. The United States Navy Band, US Air Force Band, Frost School of Music Band and Towson University Symphonic Band have also performed his band works.

Leshnoff has taught at Towson University for over twenty years on subjects including orchestration, contemporary music history, music entrepreneurship, and theory. He was the 2013 recipient of the University System of Maryland Regents Award in Scholarship, recognizing a select faculty member from the University of Maryland system for significant publication profile. The composer has entrusted all of his manuscripts to the special collections archive at Towson's Cook Library.

In the 2026–2027 season, Leshnoff is composer in residence at the Baltimore Symphony Orchestra.

=== Awards and recognition ===
In late 2019, a Nashville Symphony album featuring Leshnoff's works, including his fourth symphony (commissioned by that orchestra in collaboration with the Violins of Hope), was nominated for a GRAMMY Award for Best Classical Compendium. In an independent study, the Baltimore Symphony Orchestra found Leshnoff to be among the ten most performed living composers internationally (tied for 7th) among American orchestras in the 2015–2016 season.

=== Selected works ===
Leshnoff's catalog includes roughly eighty works to date, including five symphonies, fourteen concerti, and five oratorios. Many of his scores are available from the music publisher and distributor Theodore Presser Company.

- Symphony No. 1, Forgotten Chants and Refrains (2004)
- Violin Concerto No. 1 (2005)
- Double Concerto for Violin, Viola, and Orchestra (2007)
- Rush (2008)
- Starburst (2010)
- Concerto for Two Percussionists and Orchestra (2011)
- Hope, oratorio (2011)
- Cello Concerto (2012)
- Symphony No. 2, Innerspace (2014)
- Zohar, oratorio (2015)
- Chamber Concerto for Violin and Orchestra (2015)
- Symphony No. 3 (2015)
- Clarinet Concerto, Nekudim (2015)
- Symphony No. 4, Heichalos (2017)
- Violin Concerto No. 2 (2017)
- Piano Concerto (2019)
- Of Thee I Sing, for chorus and orchestra (2020)
- Symphony for Winds (2023)
- Symphony No. 5 (2025)

=== Discography ===
- Reference Recordings FR-738: Tchaikovsky: Symphony No. 4; Leshnoff: Double Concerto for Clarinet and Bassoon. Pittsburgh Symphony Orchestra; Manfred Honeck, conductor; Michael Rusinek, clarinet; Nancy Goeres, bassoon.
- Naxos 8.559809: Leshnoff: Symphony No. 4, Heichalos; Guitar Concerto; Starburst. Nashville Symphony; Giancarlo Guerrero, conductor; Jason Vieaux, guitar.
- Naxos 8.559398, “American Classics” series: Leshnoff: Violin Concerto [No. 1]; String Quartet No. 1, "Pearl German"; Distant Reflections. Baltimore Chamber Orchestra; Markand Thakar, conductor; Charles Wetherbee, violin; Carpe Diem String Quartet.
- Reference Recordings FR-739: Leshnoff: Symphony No. 3; Piano Concerto. Kansas City Symphony; Michael Stern, conductor; Joyce Yang, pianist; Stephen Powell, baritone.
- Naxos 8.559670, “American Classics” series: Leshnoff: Symphony No. 1, Forgotten Chants and Refrains; Double Concerto for Violin and Viola; Rush. IRIS Orchestra; Michael Stern, conductor; Charles Wetherbee, violin; Roberto Díaz, viola.
- Naxos 8.559721, “American Classics” series: Jonathan Leshnoff: Chamber Music [String Quartet No. 2, "Edelmann"; Seven Glances at a Mirage; Cosmic Variations on a Haunted Theme; Without a Chance]. Carpe Diem String Quartet; various artists.
- MSR Classics 1765: Leshnoff: String Quartet No. 3, "Miller Kahn"; String Quartet No. 4; Four Dances. Carpe Diem String Quartet.
- MSR Classics 1155: Haydn, et al. Works for Trumpet and Organ. Includes Leshnoff, Cosmic Echoes. Steven Hendrickson, trumpet; William Neil, organ.
- ASO Media CD-1008: Zohar; Symphony No. 2, Innerspace. Atlanta Symphony Orchestra and Chorus; Robert Spano, conductor; Jessica Rivera, soprano; Nmon Ford, baritone.
- USMB CD-33: Arioso. Includes Leshnoff, Clarinet Concerto, Nekudim. United States Marine Band; Col. Jason K. Fettig, conductor; Ricardo Morales, guest clarinet.
- Naxos 8.579137: Berkeley, Brahms, Leshnoff: Horn Trios. David Cooper, horn; Alexander Kerr, violin; Orion Weiss, piano.
- Naxos 8.559927: Leshnoff: Violin Concerto No. 2; Elegy; Of Thee I Sing. Oklahoma City Philharmonic; Canterbury Voices; Alexander Mickelthwate, conductor; Noah Bendix-Balgley, violin.
