= April Gornik =

American painter

- Born: April 20, 1953 (age 73); Cleveland, Ohio, U.S.
- Education: NSCAD University
- Known for: Painting
- Spouse: Eric Fischl

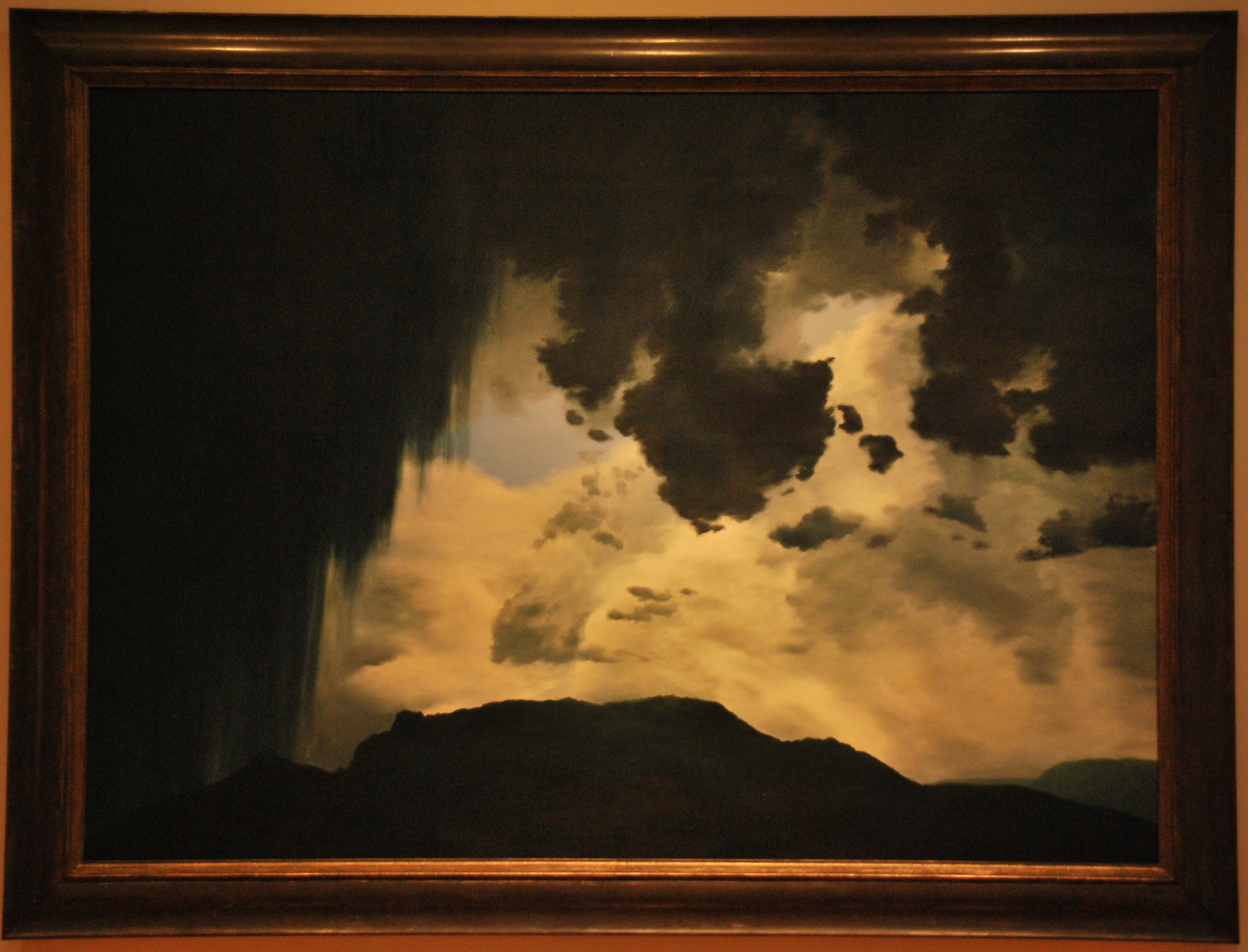
Landscape by April Gornik on display at the Dayton Art Institute in 2008.

April Gornik (born 1953, Cleveland, Ohio) is an American artist who paints American landscapes. Her realist yet dreamlike paintings and drawings embody oppositions and speak to America's historically conflicted relationship with nature. While she doesn't categorize herself as an environmental artist, she is a passionate supporter of environmental causes and has said, "I have no problem with people reading an ecological message into my work."

== Biography ==
Gornik received in 1976 her B.F.A. from the Nova Scotia College of Art and Design (now called NSCAD University), and while attending the school she met her future husband, painter Eric Fischl.

Art dealer Ed Thorp hosted her first solo exhibition in 1981, after having caught sight of her paintings while viewing Fischl's work. She is influenced by the feminist consciousness-raising of the late 20th century and, in speaking about female artists who have worked in the shadows of better known male artists, including Elaine de Kooning and Lee Krasner, she has said, "It's a problem. Women artists still receive lower prices for their art and remain less shown than their male counterparts."

In 2014, FigureGround Press published the monograph April Gornik: Drawings, an extensive look at charcoal drawings done since the mid 1980s. The book includes essays by Steve Martin and Archie Rand, an interview with Lawrence Weschler, and a digital download of a piano and cello composition by composer Bruce Wolosoff, played by Wolosoff and Sara Sant'Ambrogio of the Eroica Trio.

Gornik has remained committed to helping her community. In 2017, she and her husband donated 26 acres of land to the town of North Haven for preservation. She also supports the Southampton Animal Shelter and is involved with the Eastville Historical Society.

=== The Church ===
In 2020, Gornik co-founded The Church, a cultural and artistic center in a deconsecrated Methodist church in Sag Harbor, New York, alongside her husband, Eric Fischl. The space was envisioned as “a sanctuary for creativity,” housing exhibitions, residencies, lectures, and performances to foster cross-disciplinary artistic exchange.

=== Collections ===
Various permanent art collections include Gornik's work, including: Smithsonian American Art Museum, Metropolitan Museum of Art (the Met), the Museum of Modern Art (MoMA), Hood Museum of Art, Whitney Museum of American Art, Nasher Museum of Art, The Museum of Fine Arts, and many others.

Two of her paintings, Virga (1992) and Storm and Fires (1990) are held in the Smithsonian American Art Museum collection. In 2007, the Smithsonian Art Collectors Program commissioned Gornik to produce a print to benefit the educational and cultural programs of the Smithsonian Associates. The lithograph, entitled Blue Moonlight hangs in the ongoing exhibition Graphic Eloquence in the S. Dillon Ripley Center in the National Mall, Washington, D.C.

=== Awards ===
Gornik has received several awards: the Neuberger Museum of Art Annual Honoree (2004), the 18th annual Lifetime Achievement in the Arts Honoree (2003) by the Guild Hall of East Hampton, and the Award of Excellence for Artistic Contributions to the Fight Against AIDS from the American Foundation for AIDS Research (amfAR).

== Bibliography ==
- Martin, Steve; Rand, Archie; Weschler, Lawrence; Wolosoff, Bruce; Gornik, April (2014). April Gornik: Drawings. FigureGround Press. ISBN 978-1938922558.
- Kuspit, Donald. April Gornik: Paintings and Drawings. San Francisco: Neuberger Museum and Hudson Hills Press, 2006. ISBN 1-55595-229-1
