= Margaret Garrett =

American artist and dancer (born 1965)

- Born: April 2, 1965 (age 60); Winston-Salem, North Carolina, U.S.
- Occupations: artist, dancer
- Spouse: Bruce Wolosoff
- Children: Juliet Garrett, Katya Wolosoff
- Website: www.margaretgarrett.com

Margaret Garrett (born 1965), is an American artist and dancer. Her artistic practice includes painting, printmaking, collage, and video work. She lives and maintains a studio in Shelter Island, New York with her husband, the composer and pianist Bruce Wolosoff. She has two daughters, the singer-songwriter Juliet Garrett and the sculptor and mixed- media artist Katya Wolosoff.

== Biography ==
Margaret Garrett, born in North Carolina, United States, in 1965, and raised in Pennsylvania, began her artistic career as a dancer. At 16 years of age, she left home to join the Pennsylvania Ballet company; two years later, she joined the Cleveland Ballet as a soloist.

By the time she was 21, Garrett was seeking other career options and avenues for expression as she experimented with theater, film, and choreography. Visual art, however, held the greatest appeal. Garrett undertook private study with the artist Thorpe Feidt and studied drawing at the Art Students League in New York City.

Dance and movement inform Garrett’s work to this day: In an artist talk for the Parrish Art Museum, Garrett explained: "A lot of my painting is influenced by my background as a dancer. I see line as movement. I’m interested in the musicality of a piece — I almost see [artworks] choreographically."

Natural environments are another major influence in Garrett's work, particularly the surroundings by Garrett's studio, which is located on a beach overlooking the Shelter Island Sound. In Hamptons Artists: The Current Wave, Garrett reflected, "I love watching the movement of the sea grass and the way the light plays on the water. I’m sure those things seep into my work." Other influences include calligraphy and the patterns found within Italian friezes. Her work has been compared to the artists Joan Mitchell, Cy Twombly, and Mark Tobey.

Many of these influences are evident in Garrett’s series Tuning Fields, a collection of textural paintings that the artist began in 2008 and which includes over 300 individual works. In 2014, selections from Tuning Fields were exhibited at a solo show at the Birnam Wood Galleries in New York City. "When I started the series, I was thinking of fields of vibration and how they interact and create harmony with one another," Garrett said after the show. "And I liked the musical idea behind 'tuning' because they are sort of physical fields of movement and vibration."

The series has drawn critical praise. For Artsy, Alexxa Gotthardt wrote that "[e]n masse, the series feel likes the arc of a jazz or dance arrangement, with quiet moments and big crescendos." ARTnews described "Tuning Fields 302" as "among the most compelling of the works[.] … The little lines behind all the color could evoke both language and a musical score. They might also conjure a mass of rose petals. Therein lies the poetry of these paintings."

In 2017, Garrett returned to dancing as a way to inspire new works: She began filming herself dancing and using the video clips to create moving collages. This approach has informed much of her recent work and earned her a fellowship at the Virginia Center for the Creative Arts.

Garrett took this approach to dance-informed visual work one step further in the project The19, which includes a video, two groups of collages, and a suite of seven woodblock and chine collé prints. For these works, Garrett was inspired by the Martha Graham Dance Company’s "The 19 Poses," created in honor of the 100th anniversary of the 19th Amendment, which granted women the right to vote.

For the latter project, the Martha Graham Dance Company selected 19 photographs of the dancer and choreographer Martha Graham "in evocative moments from various performances from her long career." Garrett learned these poses "to get them in my body. It helped me to sort of understand the essence of the shape of each pose." Filming this work led to the creation of the video collage, "19," in which Garrett, in a red dress, performs the poses against a white background.

Garrett then translated the abstract gestures of the poses to a painted collage. Another painted-and cut-paper collage make up "Improvisations 1-9". In a final iteration, the gestural shapes were overlaid onto woodblock prints. In a statement, Garrett reflected: "In creating these pieces, I felt like I was working with a very potent alphabet, an intimate language about dance, women and power."

Garrett’s paintings, prints, and videos have been exhibited in galleries and museums across the United States, including Danese/Corey, the FLAG Art Foundation, Birnam Wood, the Parrish Art Museum, and Planthouse. Her work has also been included in the Armory Show, Art on Paper, the Dallas Art Fair, and the Contemporary Print Fair at the Baltimore Museum of Art. In addition to her fellowship at the Virginia Center for the Creative Arts, she has held a residency in Assisi, Italy, and collaborated on two projects with Flatbed Press in Austin, Texas. Her work is held in numerous private and corporate collections in the United States and Europe, as well as in museum collections at the Parrish Art Museum and Guild Hall museum of East Hampton.
