= Santambrogio =

Santambrogio is an Italian surname. It comes from Sant'Ambrogio meaning Saint Ambrose. Notable people with the surname include:

- Giacinto Santambrogio (1945–2012), Italian professional road racing cyclist
- Mauro Santambrogio (born 1984), Italian professional road racing cyclist

== See also ==
- Stephanie Sant’Ambrogio
