= Baltimore Chamber Orchestra =

American orchestral ensemble

The Baltimore Chamber Orchestra (BCO) is an American chamber orchestra based in Baltimore, Maryland. The orchestra gives its concerts at the Kraushaar Auditorium of Goucher College.

== History ==
The BCO's first performance was on 29 January 1984, under the baton of Anne Harrigan, the BCO's founder and first music director. Harrigan held the post until 2004. Markand Thakar succeeded Harrigan as the BCO's music director in 2004. Jonathan Leshnoff joined the orchestra as composer-in-residence in 2007. Thakar held the post through the 2022–2023 season, having announced his resignation in February 2023.

In May 2024, Robert Moody first guest-conducted the BCO. In June 2024, on the basis of this guest-conducting appearance, the BCO announced the appointment of Moody as its next music director, with immediate effect, with an initial contract of three years.

== Music directors ==
- Anne Harrigan (1984–2004)
- Markand Thakar (2004–2023)
- Robert Moody (2024–present)
