= John Sant'Ambrogio =

American cellist

John Sant’Ambrogio (born June 12, 1932, in Glen Ridge, New Jersey) is an American cellist. He studied music at Lebanon Valley College (B.A., 1954) and at Ohio University (M.M., 1959). He studied cello with Diran Alexanian (1948 to 1950), with Paul Olefsky (1950 to 1952), and with Leonard Rose (1953 to 1955).

Sant’Ambrogio was principal cellist with the U.S. Seventh Army Symphony Orchestra from 1956 to 1958, and then played with the Boston Symphony Orchestra from 1959 to 1968. He was cellist with the Boston Piano Trio from 1965 to 1968. He was principal cellist with the Saint Louis Symphony Orchestra from 1968 to 2005 under music directors Walter Susskind, Jerzy Semkow, and Leonard Slatkin.

Sant’Ambrogio has played cello with the Saint Louis String Quartet, the Giovanni String Quartet, and Washington University's Eliot Trio. He was also principal cellist with the Casals Festival Orchestra in 1969 and 1970, and with the Grand Teton Music Festival, Jackson Hole, Wyoming, from 1980 to 1985. John has also been cellist with the Zimbler Sinfonietta, and was principal cello with the Boston Ballet Orchestra. He is a member of the Generation Gap Piano Trio with violinist Dmitri Pogorelov and pianist Judith Lynn Stillman.

He has been a private cello instructor since 1959, and former pupils have obtained positions in major orchestras including the Boston Symphony Orchestra, the Chicago Symphony Orchestra, and the Saint Louis Symphony Orchestra. He has taught at Boston University (1963 to 1965), Washington University in St. Louis (1970 to 1974), the Grand Teton Music Seminar (1980 to 1985), the St. Louis Conservatory of Music (1985 to 1989), and at the Mountain Team Concepts Music Camp (founder and director, 1992 to 1996).

Sant’Ambrogio is founder (2003) and artistic director of the Arts for the Soul Summer Vacation Retreat in Steamboat Springs, Colorado.

His daughter, cellist Sara Sant'Ambrogio, is best known as a member of the Eroica Trio. His daughter Stephanie Sant’Ambrogio served as concertmaster of the San Antonio Symphony. His son Michael Sant'Ambrogio is the dean and Red Cedar Distinguished Professor at Michigan State University College of Law.

== Awards and recognitions ==
Piatigorsky Award (1953), presented at Berkshire Music Festival at Tanglewood, in Lenox, Massachusetts, the summer home of the Boston Symphony Orchestra.

National Music Educators Award (1964), featuring a solo performance with Thomas Scherman's Little Orchestra Society in The Town Hall, New York City.

Ohio University Alumni Award (1980).

== Recordings ==
The Mozart and Brahms Clarinet Quintets, with members of St Louis Symphony (VOX).

More than twenty recordings as principal cellist with the St. Louis Symphony (TELARC, RCA, BMG and VOX).
