= Nickrenz =

Nickrenz may refer to:

- Erika Nickrenz, an American classical pianist best known as the pianist for the Eroica Trio
- Joanna Nickrenz, a producer, Best Chamber Music Performance at the 44th Grammy Awards
