= Adela Peña =

American violinist

Adela Peña is an American violinist best known as a founding member of the Eroica Trio.

She was born in New York City and began playing the violin at age 4. In New York, she studied at the Henry Street Music School with violin/viola teacher Rochelle Walton.

She began playing with Erika Nickrenz, the trio pianist, when they were both 9. She has a bachelor's and a master's degree from the Juilliard School of Music, where she won the Mendelssohn Violin Competition. She also won the Washington International Competition.

Peña was the violinist for the Eroica Trio from its founding until 2006, when she left the ensemble. Currently she performs with Orpheus Chamber Orchestra.
