= Caroline Montigny-Rémaury =

French classical pianist

Caroline Montigny-Rémaury (French pronunciation: [kaʁɔlin mɔ̃tiɲi ʁemoʁi]; 22 January 1843 in Pamiers – 19 June 1913 in the 8th arrondissement of Paris) was a French classical pianist.

== Biography ==
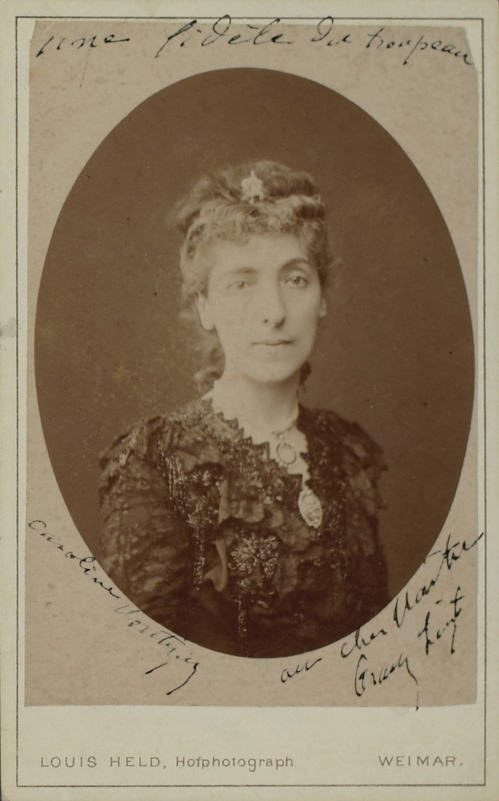

Caroline Montigny-Remaury was the wife of publicist Léon Montigny. When she became a widow, she married Auguste Wieczffinski de Serres (1841–1900), an engineer of the Ponts et chaussées. She was the sister of painter Léontine Rémaury who was the wife of the painter Louis Bauderon de Vermeron, the sister-in-law of Ambroise Thomas, director of the Conservatoire de Paris.

She was the mother of Jean-Maurice-Charles Montigny, (born 18 October 1866, Paris 9th, prefect of the Sarthe department, and Alice Montigny, pen name Henry Ferrare, the wife of sculptor Émile Lafont, (marriage on 3 July 1894, Paris 9th).

She was a pupil of Franz Liszt. She performed in the provinces and abroad, Bordeaux, Lyon, London, where her appearance caused a sensation, and at the Gürzenich Orchestra Cologne, where she had been at the request of Ferdinand Hiller, and where she obtained a real triumph.

A virtuoso pianist, she was an inspiration to many composers and was often dedicated pieces by Pierné, Fauré, and Saint-Saëns. In 1880 Fauré dedicated his Barcarolle No 1 in A minor, Op 26 to her. It was premiered by Saint-Saëns at a concert of the Société Nationale de Musique in 1882. In 1885 Saint-Saëns wrote his Wedding-Cake for her second marriage in 1886 (she then became Caroline de Serres Wieczffinski), and dedicated her his Études pour la Main gauche seule, opus 135 (1912), after she had seriously wounded her right hand, and with which she could no longer play.

She died 19 June 1913 aged 70 in her home, 2 Cité Odiot, and was buried at Père Lachaise Cemetery.
