= Guild Hall of East Hampton =

Coordinates: 40.9578°N 72.1903°W

Guild Hall of East Hampton in the incorporated Village of East Hampton on Long Island's East End, is one of the United States' first multidisciplinary cultural institutions. Opened in 1931, it was designed by architect Aymar Embury II and includes a visual art museum with three galleries and the Hilarie and Mitchell Morgan Theater, a 1931 jewel-box proscenium stage. Following a comprehensive renovation completed in 2024, the facility features upgraded museum galleries, theater space, and educational facilities. It is historically significant for its role in exhibiting the works of the American Abstract expressionists Jackson Pollock, Willem de Kooning, Lee Krasner, John Ferren, and Robert Motherwell; performances by Helen Hayes, Thornton Wilder, Douglas Fairbanks, Jr., Bob Fosse and Gwen Verdon, Eli Wallach and Anne Jackson, and hundreds of other world-class stars of stage and screen; and involvement by the literary figures George Plimpton, Peter Matthiessen, Gore Vidal, Edward Albee, and John Steinbeck. Guild Hall presents more than 200 programs annually and hosts approximately 60,000 visitors each year. It holds a permanent collection of 2,400 works of art and continues to build on important relationships in the worlds of film, theatre, dance, music, and visual art.

== History ==
Conceived of and mainly funded by the philanthropists Mr. and Mrs. Mary and Lorenzo E. Woodhouse, Guild Hall opened to great fanfare on August 19, 1931 ("East Hampton has never known a celebration like that"), when 1,000 people crammed into the theater and gallery. The building site, on Main Street, was the former homestead of Samuel Miller, a farmer, between the First Presbyterian Church of East Hampton and Mulford Farm, a homestead which dates back to pre-Revolutionary War times.

As stated in the legal documents granting permission for the forming of Guild Hall, its mission has been, from the outset, to "encourage and cultivate a taste for music, drama, and the arts through the presentation of musical, dramatic and other intellectual and instructive opinions; to furnish galleries for art entertainments; for the exchange of and objects of [sic] historical interest; to furnish a meeting place for various organizations; in short to promote and encourage a higher type of citizenship".

Guild Hall's early trustees were predominantly members of the conservative social elite with token representation from the year-round community. Eventually, the "rebels in their own social set" persuaded the reluctant board to agree to a regional invitational visual arts show that would bring some of the most prominent artists of the day—as well as an embracing of more broad and avant garde criteria—to Guild Hall.

== Visual arts ==
In 1973, Guild Hall Museum was among the earliest institutions in the United States to receive formal accreditation from the American Alliance of Museums. Of the 35,000 museums nationwide, Guild Hall is still one of approximately 1,000 to hold this distinction. The museum mounts eight to ten exhibitions per year, including an East End–wide student art exhibition. One of two galleries at Guild Hall is named for its founder, Mrs. Lorenzo E. Woodhouse; another for the painter Thomas Moran, who is credited with "colonizing" the Village of East Hampton as an artists' community in the mid-19th century. The third, smallest, gallery is named for the East Hampton artist and collector Tito Spiga, whose bequest funded the building of the gallery upon his death in 1988.

There have been many notable artists of historical interest who have been exhibited at Guild Hall, such as Roy Lichtenstein, Lee Krasner, Jackson Pollock, Childe Hassam, Franz Kline, Robert Dash, Fairfield Porter, Thomas Moran, and Robert Motherwell. In recent years, art by area artists who are also internationally celebrated has included that of Larry Rivers, Ross Bleckner, Eric Fischl, April Gornik, Miriam Schapiro, Esteban Vicente, Barbara Kruger, Audrey Flack, Elaine de Kooning, Andy Warhol, Dan Flavin, Elliott Erwitt, Hans Namuth, Julian Schnabel, and Jane Wilson.

=== Notable exhibitions ===
17 Artists of Eastern Long Island: In 1949, the Board reluctantly agreed to the first Guild Hall regional invitational show, which installed works by Jackson Pollock, Lee Krasner, Balcomb Greene and Nat Werner, among others. Attendance of the preview was one of the largest on record. The show coincided with an August 8, 1949, four-page spread in Life magazine, "Jackson Pollock: Is He the Greatest Living Painter in the United States?", which introduced Pollock to the world and solidified his role as an international sensation. Pollock and his wife, the artist Lee Krasner, had been living and working at their famed studio in Springs, outside the Village, since 1945, which is now the Pollock-Krasner House.

New Additions to the Guild Hall Permanent Collection: In 2014, the museum held a major exhibition of works of area artists that had recently been added to its permanent collection. The exhibit reflected "the abundance and diversity of artistic practice on the East End of Long Island" and was "a thought-provoking exhibition that beckons revisiting ...". Works by Jennifer Bartlett, Chuck Close, Carolyn Conrad, Robert Dash, Eric Fischl, Cornelia Foss, Ralph Gibson, April Gornik, Mary Heilmann, William King, Barbara Kruger, Thomas Moran, Costantino Nivola, Alfonso Ossorio, Betty Parsons, Clifford Ross, David Salle, and Carol Saxe were included.

Robert Motherwell: The East Hampton Years, 1944–1952: Curated by Phyllis Tuchman and accompanied by a book with the same title, the 2014 show of approximately 25 works brought together Motherwell’s fusion of gestural abstraction and Color Field painting, while also including some of his collages and published examples of his work as an editor.

Annual Artist Members Exhibition: First mounted in 1938, the sole criterion is membership in Guild Hall. The exhibit has been noted for its non-jury policy which, in an area historically known for the visual arts and its close proximity to New York City, creates a mix of "prestigious area professionals showing next to those less well known and hoping to be discovered".

Julian Schnabel: Selected Works from Home: Presented from August to October 2024, this exhibition brought together paintings and sculptures from the artist’s personal collection, offering an intimate look at works created over several decades. Julian Schnabel, known for his large-scale plate paintings and contributions to contemporary cinema, has long maintained a home and studio in Montauk. The show was described by Whitewall magazine as a “must-see exhibition in the Hamptons,” reflecting both Schnabel’s international stature and his connection to the East End art community.

== Theater arts ==
The Hilarie and Mitchell Morgan Theater at Guild Hall produces more than 100 programs each year, including plays, concerts, dance performances, film screenings, simulcasts, and literary readings. It was originally named the John Drew Theater after matinee idol John Drew Jr., a member of the Barrymore family who summered in East Hampton from the late 19th century to the early 20th century. The theater has an octagonal shape, a jewel-box proscenium stage, and a blue-and-white striped trompe-l'œil circus-tent ceiling that sweeps up to a chandelier of glass balloons.

In its early years, the theater served as a summer testing ground for productions en route to Broadway. Legendary playwrights such as Tennessee Williams and Eugene O’Neill credited Guild Hall with helping to establish their reputations, and Edward Albee had a lifelong relationship with the John Drew Theater, where he was an active member of the Guild Hall Academy of the Arts. Performers have included the Academy, Emmy, Grammy, and Tony Award–winning luminaries Alec Baldwin, Matthew Broderick, Blythe Danner, James Earl Jones, Patti LuPone, Wynton Marsalis, Liza Minnelli, Leslie Odom Jr., Audra McDonald, Laurie Metcalf, Mercedes Ruehl, Steve Martin, and Marlo Thomas; the dance companies Alvin Ailey American Dance Theater, New York City Ballet, and Pilobolus; the performance artists Laurie Anderson and Meredith Monk; the directors Robert Wilson, Susan Stroman, Tony Walton, Harris Yulin, Bob Fosse, Gwen Verdon, and Julie Taymor; the jazz greats Winton Marsalis, Branford Marsalis, Sonny Rollins, Earl Klugh and Regina Carter; the comedians Jay Leno, Joy Behar, John Leguizamo, Jerry Seinfeld, and Martin Short; and the legendary musicians Mavis Staples, Patti Smith, Philip Glass, Billy Joel, and The Beach Boys.

A major renovation led by Peter Pennoyer Architects and Apeiro Design, completed in 2024, modernized the stage, seating, acoustics, accessibility features, backstage facilities, and technical systems as part of a campus-wide upgrade.

=== Notable productions ===
The longest-running off-Broadway musical, The Fantasticks, was produced at Guild Hall’s John Drew Theater before starting its historic New York run. Nora Ephron and Delia Ephron debuted Love, Loss, and What I Wore at Guild Hall before taking the play Off Broadway. Tennessee Williams's The Glass Menagerie, starring Amy Irving and Ebon Moss-Bachrach, was the inaugural play after the two-year 2009 theater renovation. Alec Baldwin and Laurie Metcalf starred in a revival of Arthur Miller's All My Sons in 2015. In May 2025, the newly renamed Hilarie and Mitchell Morgan Theater presented Fuenteovejuna: East End, the venue’s first Spanish-language theater production, adapted from Lope de Vega’s 17th-century play, followed by Cruce de Caminos in 2026, both presented with Community Artists-in-Residence, Minerva Perez, and Margarita Espada, in partnership with OLA of Eastern Long Island.

=== Hamptons Film Festival ===
Since the inception of the Hamptons International Film Festival (HIFF), Guild Hall has played a role in the festival. The theater screens films during the festival, as well as offering special programming and screening during the year in partnership with HIFF. Academy Award–winning films that have premiered at the festival and screened at Guild Hall have included Gods and Monsters, Black Swan, Pollock, and Moonlight. In recent years, Guild Hall has also hosted HIFF’s “SummerDocs” and “Now Showing” series, which bring documentary and independent film screenings to East Hampton year-round.

=== William P. Raynor Artist-in-Residence ===
The Guild Hall William P. Raynor Artist-in-Residence program offers artist collectives the time and space to research, experiment and develop new ideas and projects. Artists are provided with creative mentorships, administrative support, a commissioning fee, living space and a purpose built studio. Over the years many artists who have participated in the program have gone on to stage their works at renowned artistic institutions in New York City, including New York City Center, Lincoln Center and BAM. Highlighting Guild Hall as an incubator for new works.

== Education, Community and Public Engagement ==
=== Academy of the Arts ===
Past recipients of the Academy of the Arts award have included the actor Lauren Bacall, playwright Joe Pintauro, the artist Paul Davis, and the author John Irving. Susan Stroman is the current Academy of the Arts president, after taking over from artist Eric Fischl in 2025. The academy supports and mentors emerging artists through initiatives such as the Artist-in-Residence (AIR) program, which aims to sustain the Hamptons’ legacy as an arts colony. Recent programs have expanded to include cross-disciplinary residencies and public presentations by artists in the fields of visual art, performance, and literature.

=== Hamptons Institute ===
The Hamptons Institute, originally formed in 2010 by board chairman Melville "Mickey" Straus, was revived by actor Alec Baldwin and institute director Tracy Marshall in 2016 to present a range of intellectual and professional perspectives on challenging issues and to engage in thoughtful debate and deliberation on subjects ranging from economics and business to politics and public policy, and from arts and culture to the role of the media. Panel discussions in recent years have featured panelists Amy Goodman, Nicholas Lemann, Bob Garfield, Jonathan Alter, Sen. Kirsten Gillibrand, Dr. Paul Farmer, Elizabeth Warren, Van Jones, Ken Auletta, Katie Couric, John Podhoretz, and Monica Crowley. The program returned in 2025 under the leadership of Executive Director Andrea Grover in partnership with The Common Good, Ellen Chesler, and Patricia Duff, with recent events focusing on climate change, global health, the future of journalism, political activism, the economy, and America in the world as we celebrate the 250th with Secretary Hillary Rodham Clinton.

According to Baldwin in 2025,

What Tracy Marshall and I did was revive, at the request of Andrea Grover, executive director at Guild Hall, the old Hamptons Institute that Mickey Straus had put together. ... We did it with a little bit of trepidation, because I thought it's [something] where you live or die by who you cast. Who are you going to get to do this? Are they well known or are they really just these dazzling authorities? Who’s going to show up, and therefore what kind of a program are we going to have? How are we going to be received? ... The final one [this year], "The New Normal in News: Ideology vs. Fact," which I am moderating, is all about the discussion of fake news versus mainstream media.

=== Education programs ===
Guild Hall's founding principle in 1931 was to be a gathering place where an appreciation for the arts would serve "to promote a finer type of citizenship", with educational programs championing a vigorous, growing network of intergenerational artists who would, in turn, extend the legacy of the region as one of the country’s most storied arts colonies. Guild Hall offers a variety of educational programs in the visual and performing arts for adults (Art Socials) and for children aged 5–18. The Guild Hall Teen Arts Council (GHTAC) is a program that offers ten teenagers per year the opportunity to work for Guild Hall as content producers, curators, and programmers. Modeled after the Walker Art Center's pioneering program, the GHTAC meets bimonthly with a GH coordinator to generate programming for their peers. GHTAC members are chosen each semester by an application process and are paid for their work.
