= Carpe Diem String Quartet =

- Also known as: CDSQ
- Origin: Columbus, Ohio, United States
- Occupation: String Quartet
- Years active: 2005–present
- Labels: Naxos, MSR, Seize the Music, Albany Records, Weasel Records, Sound Endeavors
- Members: Violin; Sam Weiser; Violin; Marisa Ishikawa; Viola; Korine Fujiwara; Cello; Ariana Nelson
- Website: www.carpediemstringquartet.com

The Carpe Diem String Quartet is a classical string quartet, founded in 2005 in Columbus, Ohio.

The current members as of their 19th season in 2024-25 are Sam Weiser, 1st violin; Marisa Ishikawa, 2nd violin; Korine Fujiwara, viola; and Ariana Nelson, cello. Though the members live elsewhere now, the Carpe Diem board of trustees is still based in Columbus. The quartet's repertoire ranges from classical to contemporary chamber music. They regularly perform the works of contemporaries like Reza Vali, Richard Danielpour, Jonathan Leshnoff. A New York Times article featured a listening recommendation to their recording by Reza Vali of "Ashoob (Calligraphy No. 14)” They also perform from the standard quartet repertoire such as the masterpieces by Wolfgang Amadeus Mozart, Ludwig van Beethoven and Felix Mendelssohn.

Carpe Diem performs and tours regularly in the United States, Canada, Japan, China, and Europe. The quartet is an active proponent for the overlooked Russian composer Sergei Taneyev, and recorded his nine string quartets, as well as his viola quintet, for the Naxos label. The quartet regularly performs and collaborates with non-classical artists, including Willy Porter and Jayme Stone. Some of the artists with whom the quartet has collaborated include Yo-Yo Ma, David Krakuaer, Raul Juarena, and Richard Stoltzman.

== Commitments ==
=== Recent activity ===
The Carpe Diem quartet performed at Carnegie Weill Recital Hall on Feb.27 2025. They are the resident ensemble for the Concerts In The Barn music festival in Quilcene, Washington. The quartet was the resident ensemble for two years in Siena, Italy at the Accademia Chigiana and performs regularly for the Snake River Music Festival . The quartet has worked extensively with the composer Reza Vali. This included commissioning through Chamber Music America a major work, Raak, which premiered at Carnegie Hall, and recording all of his music for string quartet on three CDs. The quartet has recently worked with Richard Danielpour, performing his 6th string quartet and serving as the ensemble in residence for the Sienna International Composition program.

Selected past activities

Carpe Diem commissioned Jonathan Leshnoff's 4th string quartet, and recently released a CD featuring Leshnoff's 3rd and 4th string quartets, and his Four Dances for string quartet. Bruce Wolosoff, whose eighteen-movement piece entitled "Songs without Words" was commissioned, premiered, and recorded by the quartet. In January 2009, the quartet performed in New York City with the Columbus Dance Theater, followed by a tour in Texas. In early February the quartet toured in Colorado before reuniting with acclaimed accordionist and bandoneonist Peter Soave for a tour in Michigan and Ohio in March. They concluded their 2008–2009 season with a concert at the University of Cincinnati's College-Conservatory of Music. For several weeks spanning between July and August, the quartet performed in Denver, Colorado, and participated in the Snake River Music Festival in Dillon and Keystone.

The quartet opened the 2009–2010 season at their new venue: the Harrison Park clubhouse, situated on the banks of the Olentangy River near the Short North and Victorian Village neighborhoods, all of which are just outside downtown Columbus.

The quartet traveled to New York City to perform at the club Le Poisson Rouge in January 2010. They also performed at WNYC's Greene Space, and the Nabi Gallery, and were featured at APAP and Chamber Music America showcases. The quartet closed off the month with concerts in Detroit and at Southern Illinois University. CDSQ returned to the University of Cincinnati for a week-long camp of classes and performances. The quartet once again spent parts of July and August in Colorado as part of the Snake River Music Festival.

== Willy Porter ==
One of the quartet's most important non-classical collaborations has been with singer-songwriter Willy Porter. Writes one reviewer: "Willy Porter is an 'active' guitarist. That is, he boasts some serious chops, his style is percussive and intricate, and he often employs complex, syncopated grooves, a la Leo Kottke." The quartet began working with Porter in early 2010, resulting in a live recorded performance in Columbus. Since then, Porter and the quartet have performed together across the Midwest. Porter and Carpe Diem have released two CDs, "Live from BoMA" and "Human Kindness".

== Columbus Dance Theater ==
CDSQ has had a deep partnership with the Columbus Dance Theatre. They have performed consistently in Columbus and beyond. This collaboration has produced multiple world premieres, including Claudel, a ballet based on the life of the sculptor Camille Claudel, Anne Frank, based on her life, Hamlet, and Entangled Banks.

== Educational outreach ==
Like many musical organizations, the quartet is dedicated to sharing the joy of music - particularly chamber music. During their free time, the quartet continues to work with schools and arts groups to foster kids' love of music. Their concerts are interactive and hands-on for the students and relate to core academic classes. The quartet has launched two new programs: Musicare and Music Goes to School, which enable the quartet to bring music to everyone in the Central Ohio area, regardless of their means or circumstances. Of special note, in the spring of 2008, the quartet performed for the Great Lakes Caravan, which brings professional musicians to low-income communities in the Great Lakes region.

For one week in August 2009, the quartet worked with 16 students during violinist Charles Wetherbee's Scale the Summit music camp. Though in its first year, the camp was hugely successful and very well received, it concluded with performances by both student-only ensembles and also ensembles including members of CDSQ.

In November 2009, the quartet embarked on a two-week trip to Tokyo, Japan, where they worked closely with the music students of Rikkyo University and performed with them in Japan's premier Suntory Hall. The quartet performed to critical acclaim and was eagerly invited back.

== Recordings ==
The quartet has worked extensively to record works by Russian composer, Sergei Taneyev; five (5) CDs of Taneyev's String Quartets 1 - 9, and his viola quintet, are available under the Naxos label. In the summer of 2009, CDSQ recorded "Montana" and "Entangled Banks", both composed by violist Korine Fujiwara, for an upcoming CD. "Songs Without Words", composed by Bruce Wolosoff for the quartet, was successfully recorded earlier in 2009 and has been made available for digital download on Naxos's website. Physical CDs of the recording were released in December 2010.

A huge honor for the Carpe Diem String Quartet was when they received nominations for the 2009 Grammy Awards in four categories: Best Classical Album, Best Chamber Music Performance, Best New Artist, and Best Engineered Album- Classical.

Carpe Diem's discography includes:

- Taneyev, String Quartets volumes 1 - 5 (Naxos)
- Jonathan Leshnoff, String Quartets 3, 4, and Four Dances (MSR)
- Jonathan Leshnoff, String Quartet No. 1 (Naxos)
- Jonathan Leshnoff, String Quartet No. 2 (Naxos)
- Trickster Tales, music of John Gunther
- Jeff Midkiff, music for mandolin and string quartet (Seize the Music)
- Reza Vali, The Book of Calligraphy (Albany)
- Reza Vali, Longing (MSR)
- Human Kindness, music of Willy Porter (Weasel Records)
- Seize the Day, music of Richard Smoot (Sound Endeavors)
- Positive Energy, music by Mendelssohn, Monti, Bradley Sowash, Astor Piazzolla, and traditional (Seize the Music)
- Montana, music by Korine Fujiwara (Seize the Music)
- Songs without Words by Bruce Wolosoff (Naxos)
- Live at BoMA by Willy Porter and Carpe Diem String Quartet (Weasel Records)
