= Erika Nickrenz =

American classical pianist (born 1963)

Erika Nickrenz (born 1963) is an American classical pianist best known as the pianist for the Eroica Trio.

Both her parents are professional musicians, her mother, Joanna Nickrenz, a Grammy Award-winning pianist and her father a violist. She began playing the piano at age 6 and studied with German Diez at the Claudio Arrau School in New York City.

She began playing with Adela Peña, the violinist in the Eroica Trio, when they were both 9. She made her concerto debut at 11 at New York's Town Hall. She met Sara Sant'Ambrogio, the third member of the trio, at 12 when she studied with Sara's grandmother, Isabelle Sant'Ambrogio. She received both her bachelor's and master's degrees from the Juilliard School of Music where she studied with Abbey Simon.
