= Germaine Thyssens-Valentin =

Dutch-born classical pianist (1902-1987)

Thyssens-Valentin in the 1950s

Germaine Thyssens-Valentin (27 July 1902 – 7 July 1987) was a Dutch-born classical pianist of Franco-Dutch parentage, noted for her performances of French music. She studied under Gabriel Fauré at the Paris Conservatoire, and in the 1950s, after a long absence from performing while she raised a family of five children, she recorded a series of discs of Fauré's music that have been reissued on compact disc to considerable acclaim.

== Life and career ==
She was born as Germaine Suzanna Jeanne Thyssens in Maastricht in the Netherlands, the eldest of the three children of a Dutch father, born Joannes Jacobus Thijssen but known as Jean-Jacques Thyssens, and his wife Jeanne Caroline Schmidt, who was from Alsace. Jean-Jacques, who was director of Peugeot in Belgium, died in July 1907, when his eldest child was not quite five years old. Encouraged by her mother, she began to study the piano when she was about five years old, and later also studied the harpsichord. At the age of eight she made her concert debut playing Mozart's Piano Concerto No. 23 in A, winning high praise from the critics.

She studied at the Royal Academy of Liège, and in 1914, at the age of 13, entered the Conservatoire de Paris, which was then headed by Gabriel Fauré. She studied in the class of Isidor Philipp and later of Marguerite Long. To support herself while a student, she gave piano lessons and played incidental music in cinemas. In 1920 she was awarded the first prize at the Conservatoire in piano and in musical history.

In December 1924 Thyssens married Paul Valentin, and hyphenated his name with hers. By now she had begun to establish herself as a piano soloist, appearing with leading chamber musicians and with the Concerts Colonne, but she gave up her musical career completely to raise her family of five children.

After 25 years away from professional music, Thyssens-Valentin resumed her career in 1951, with a performance of the Mozart concerto in which she had made her debut as an eight-year-old. The conductor for her return concert was Albert Wolff, through whom she was introduced to the director of the Salzburg Festival, where she made her first appearance the following year. Between 1956 and 1959, she recorded a series of discs for the French recording company Ducretet-Thomson. They were not widely available outside France, and as the company failed to keep pace with the introduction of stereophonic recording its catalogue went out of print during the 1960s.

In 1956, Thyssens-Valentin became the first pianist to play all Fauré's piano works at a series of concerts. She gave a second complete cycle the following year. Between 1958 and 1966 she also taught. In the 1960s she took part in the first performance of a complete cycle of Fauré's chamber music in company with, among others, Paul Tortelier. She continued to promote the works of Fauré in later years, including by teaching masterclasses and creating a fingered edition of the first eight Nocturnes. After she had played all 13 of his nocturnes at the Salle Gaveau in 1974, Fauré's daughter-in-law greeted her with the words, "Oh! Madame, quel effort!"

Thyssens-Valentin retired in 1983; her last concert, in November of that year comprised music by Bach, Mozart, Beethoven, Fauré and Debussy. She died in Paris in 1987, aged 84.

== Reputation ==
Though Thyssens-Valentin was little known outside France during her lifetime, the reissue on compact discs of her Ducretet-Thomson recordings, particularly those of Fauré's music, brought her to a wider international audience. In Gramophone magazine, the critic Michael Oliver wrote that although never having previously heard of her,

I now have not the slightest doubt that Germaine Thyssens-Valentin (1902–87) was a great and inspired pianist; I've heard Fauré playing that approaches, or even occasionally equals hers, but none that surpasses it. Fauré's music has a confiding quality to it, as though it were a message intended for an audience of one, and Thyssens-Valentin is in perfect accord with this. Those messages, however, especially in the later Nocturnes and Barcarolles, are often of great profundity, and she has both the heart and the technique to convey them. I have not often been so struck by Fauré's extraordinary courage in distilling emotions far too deep for words from the silent isolation of his old age. Why is Thyssens-Valentin not better known? I suppose that being a superlative interpreter of Fauré was not a reliable passport to international fame in the middle years of the 20th century.

The critic Bryce Morrison, a specialist in piano music, wrote of her playing of Fauré as "distinctive, fluid, understated and of a rare tonal and poetic delicacy and finesse … No other pianist, in my experience, has shown a comparable inwardness or capacity to penetrate to the very quick or essence of one of music's most misunderstood geniuses."

Her Gramophone Award winning recording of Fauré's Nocturnes is especially admired: in November 2011, in a comparative review for BBC Radio 3 of all recordings of the Nocturnes, Stephen Plaistow judged Thyssens-Valentin's recording to be the finest.

== Discography ==
Recordings by Thyssens-Valentin include:

- Debussy, En blanc et noir – with Jeanne Sleeve-Thais, piano (Testament)
- Fauré, Works for piano – (1956–59, Testament SBT 1215, 1262, 1263 and 1400)
- Fauré, Piano Quintets; Piano Quartet No 1, with the Quartet of the ORTF (Editions A. Charlin)
- Franck, Prelude, choral & fugue (1954, Testament)
- Franck, Prelude, aria & finale (1954, Testament)
- Mozart, Piano Concerto No. 23 K. 488 – Camerata Academica of Salzburg, Bernhard Paumgartner (1953, Testament SBT 1401)
- Nin, Chants populaires espagnols – with Maria Kareska, soprano (Ducretet-Thomson, 1956)
