= Leonard Rose =

American cellist & pedagogue (1918–1984)

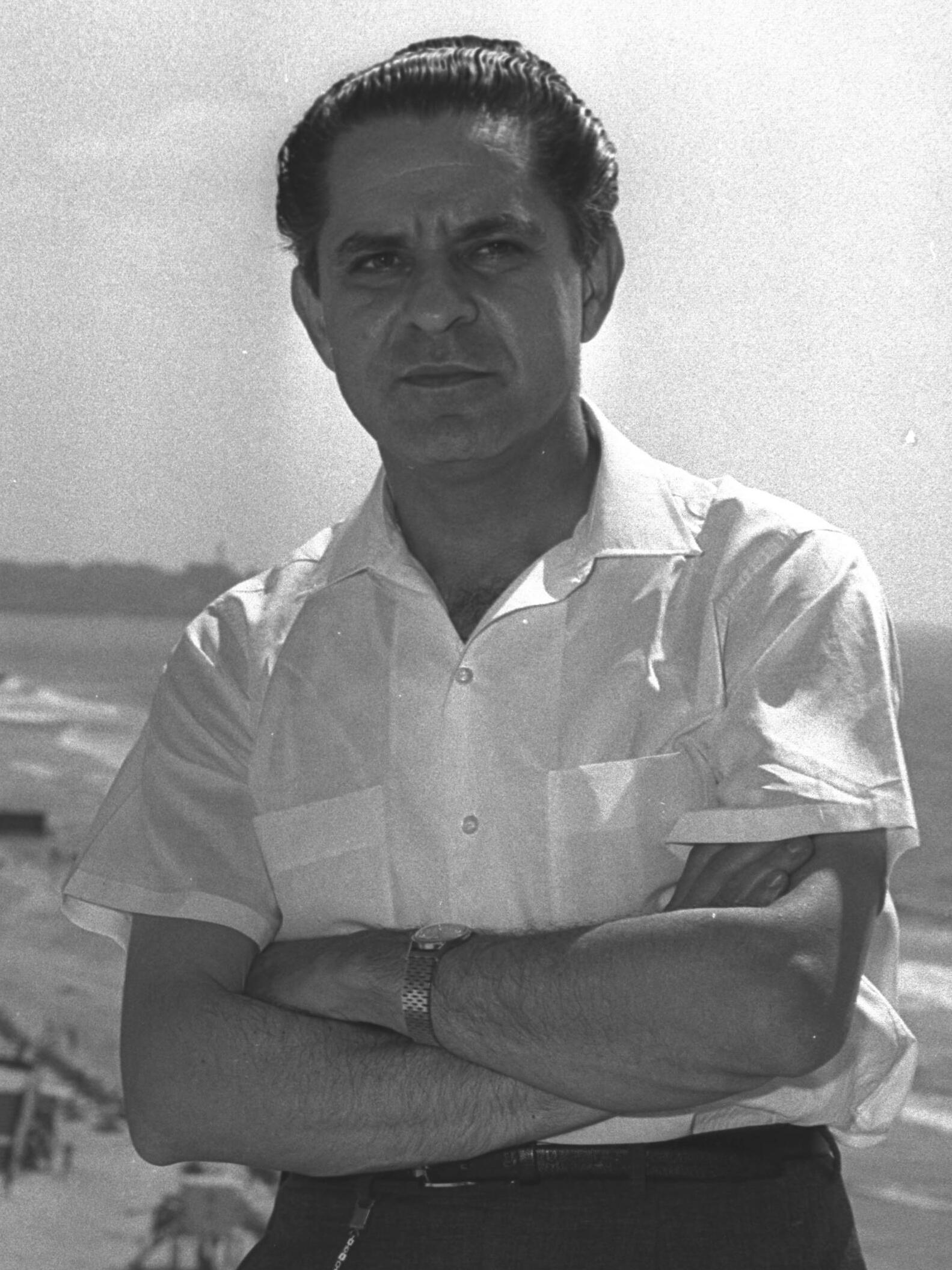
- Leonard Rose, Tel Aviv, 1961
- Born: Leonard Joseph Rose; July 27, 1918; Washington, D.C., U.S.
- Died: November 16, 1984 (aged 66); White Plains, New York, U.S.
- Occupations: Cellist; Cello pedagogue

Leonard Joseph Rose (July 27, 1918 – November 16, 1984) was an American cellist and pedagogue.

== Biography ==
Rose was born in Washington, D.C. His parents were Jewish immigrants, his father from Bragin, Belarus, and his mother from Kyiv, Ukraine. Rose started taking piano lessons when he was eight years old before switching to the cello when he was ten years old at the suggestion of his father. His cello teachers were Walter Grossman, Frank Miller and Felix Salmond. After completing his studies at Philadelphia's Curtis Institute of Music at age 20, he joined Arturo Toscanini's NBC Symphony Orchestra, and almost immediately became associate principal. At 21 he was principal cellist of the Cleveland Orchestra and at 26 became the principal of the New York Philharmonic.

He made many recordings as a soloist after 1951, including concertos with conductors such as Leonard Bernstein, Eugene Ormandy, George Szell and Bruno Walter among others. Rose also joined with Isaac Stern and Eugene Istomin in a celebrated piano trio.

Rose's legacy as a teacher remains to this day: his students from the Juilliard School, Curtis Institute and Ivan Galamian's Meadowmount Summer School fill the sections of many American orchestras, notably those of the Boston Symphony Orchestra, Cleveland Orchestra, Philadelphia Orchestra, and the New York Philharmonic. His pupils include Lori Singer, Raymond Davis, Desmond Hoebig, Peter Stumpf, Fred Sherry, Christopher von Baeyer, Myung-wha Chung, Patrick Sohn, Thomas Demenga, Stephen Kates, Lynn Harrell, Yehuda Hanani, Hans Jørgen Jensen, Steven Honigberg, Eric Kim, Roger Drinkall, Robert deMaine, Bruce Uchimura, Donald Whitton, Yo-Yo Ma, Ronald Leonard, Steven Pologe, Sara Sant'Ambrogio, Matt Haimovitz, Mats Lidström, Richard Hirschl, John Sant’Ambrogio, and Marijane Carr Siegal.

Rose died in White Plains, New York, of leukemia. In November 2009, a memorial marker was placed for Rose in the Mt. Ararat Cemetery in Farmingdale, New York, next to the grave of his first wife, Minnie Knopow Rose, who died in 1964. Minnie and Leonard met at Curtis, where she studied viola. His second wife was Xenia Petschek, whom he married in January 1965. Rose played an Amati cello dated 1662, played today by Gary Hoffman.

== Awards and recognitions ==
Grammy Award for Best Chamber Music Performance

- Eugene Istomin, Leonard Rose & Isaac Stern for Beethoven: The Complete Piano Trios (1971)
