= Greenwich Village Orchestra =

Orchestra in New York City (founded 1986)

- Orchestra
- Short name: GVO
- Founded: 1986
- Location: Greenwich Village, New York City, U.S.
- Concert hall: Washington Irving Campus
- Music director: Barbara Yahr
- Website: www.gvo.org

The Greenwich Village Orchestra (GVO) is a semi-professional orchestra based in the heart of Greenwich Village. It is made up of volunteer musicians and performs six scheduled concerts per season from September to June. Concerts are usually held in the auditorium of the Washington Irving High School.

== Organization ==
The Greenwich Village Orchestra has a roster of nearly 60 musicians. It is governed by a board of directors and is run by an all-volunteer staff.

== History ==
The Greenwich Village Orchestra was founded in 1986 by Robert Grehan and a group of musicians from the New York Metropolitan area. Its membership is very diverse with members hailing from all walks of life, geographic locations and cultural backgrounds.

The Orchestra has had three music directors: Robert Grehan (1986–1995), Scott Jackson Wiley (1997–2001), and Barbara Yahr (2002–present). The GVO has also enjoyed the musical insights brought by several guest conductors including David Amram, Michael Gilbert, Alejandro Guzman, David Leibowitz, Mark Mandorano, Gregory Ortega, Ki-Sun Sung, Peter Szep, and Sybille Werner.

The GVO has performed a wide repertoire such as Bach, Beethoven, Bruckner, and beyond. Over its history, the orchestra has commissioned new music, provided composer contests, and performed world premieres such as the 1990 premiere of Bruce Wolosoff's When Fire Flows like Water. In 2005, the GVO was a commission partner with orchestras in all 50 states and performed the New York City premiere of Joan Tower's "Made in America".

Other musical highlights include Beethoven's Ninth Symphony (performed in 1992 with the Stonewall Chorale and in 2003 with the chorus Seraphim), and Handel's Messiah. In 2005, the Orchestra performed Copland's Lincoln Portrait, narrated by former Senator Bob Kerrey. The Orchestra pas performed more than 120 concerts over the last 20 years.

The GVO has featured many world-acclaimed soloists, including Stanley Drucker (clarinet), Kenneth Gordon (violin), Robert Langevin (flute), Philip Myers (horn), Sheryl Staples (violin), Colin Jacobsen (violin, first at the age of 12 and then a decade later), Adele Anthony (violin), Edward Arron (cello), Harvey DeSouza (violin), Nancy Goeres (bassoon), Indira Koch (violin), Clancy Newman (cello), Wolfgang Emanuel Schmidt (cello), and Carol Yahr (soprano).

Many musicians of the GVO have been showcased as soloists over the years, such as Gene Citronbaum (former Principal Trumpet), Gary Dranch (Principal Clarinet), Simon Dratfield (Principal Flute), Gerard Gordon (Marimba and Principal Timpani), Ricardo Cox (former Principal Trumpet), Amy Mendillo (former Principal Oboe), Dan Purgason (English Horn), Warren Wernick (Principal Trumpet), Daryl Nuccio (Principal Cello), Midhat Serbagi (former Principal Viola), and Robin Zeh (former Concertmaster).

As a volunteer community orchestra, they put special value in reaching out to their community, audience, and neighborhood. In 2005, they performed their first benefit concert for the Performing Arts House at Washington Irving High School. This collaboration included active participation from the school's teachers, choral students, dance students and jazz band.

For many years they have performed a family concert each season with the special focus on inspiring, educating and entertaining young audiences. In 2004, through a partnership with Play it by Ear Productions, the GVO reached out to even more school children. The GVO has also instituted an annual Young Artists' Competition and have invited their winners to perform with them for the past few seasons. They have performed summer concerts in Gramercy Park in collaboration with the Gramercy Park Block Association, and in the Summer of 2000 they performed in the Austin J. Tobin Plaza at the World Trade Center.

They also perform every Summer in Union Square Park, at their outdoor concert series sponsored by the Union Square Partnership, bringing symphonic classical music to a greater audience.
