= Ricardo Morales (musician) =

American clarinetist

- Born: 1972 (age 53–54); Puerto Rico
- Genres: Classical music
- Occupation: Clarinetist
- Instrument: Clarinet
- Years active: 1990s–present
- Website: Online Clarinet School with Ricardo Morales

Ricardo Morales (born 1972) is a classical clarinetist of Puerto Rican descent. Since 2003, he has been the principal clarinetist of the Philadelphia Orchestra. Prior to that, he was the principal clarinetist at the Metropolitan Opera Orchestra. At age 18, Morales began his professional career with the Florida Symphony Orchestra. He currently serves on the faculty of Temple University.

In September, 2012, he launched the "Online Clarinet School with Ricardo Morales" as a part of the ArtistWorks Classical Campus.
