= Michael Guttman =

Belgian musician (born 1957)

Michael Guttman (born 20 December 1957) is a violinist, chamber musician, conductor and festival director. He is the brother of actor Ronald Guttman. He plays a 1735 Guarneri violin.

== Early life ==
Guttman was born in Brussels, Belgium. His mother, Simone Guttman, a pianist, encouraged him to begin violin studies at an early age. He was admitted to the Royal Conservatory of Brussels, before being admitted to the Juilliard School at age 17. There, he studied with Dorothy DeLay, Felix Galimir and the Juilliard Quartet.

== Career ==
In 1988 Guttman made his New York recital debut. He worked with Israeli composers, including Noam Sheriff, on an album with the London Philharmonic. He later performed as soloist and recitalist in London's Barbican Centre, New York's Avery Fisher Hall, Amsterdam's Concertgebouw and Tokyo Bunka Kaikan in Japan, among others. He has recorded 20th-century violin concertos with the Royal Philharmonic and the London Philharmonic which have been broadcast by the BBC.

Guttman performed at various classical music festivals, including the Gstaad Festival and at Claudio Abbado's Ferrara Musica, and at La Fenice in Venice and Salle Pleyel in Paris. In 2009 he performed a solo at the Cross Currents Chamber Music Arts Festival in North Carolina.

In 2006 Guttman founded Pietrasanta in Concerto, a chamber music festival in Pietrasanta, Italy. He is the musical director of the festival. In 2014, the city of Pietrasanta granted Guttman honorary citizenship.

He acted as music director and conductor of the Atlantic Chamber Orchestra, the resident orchestra of the Music Festival of the Hamptons.

Guttman began conducting in addition to his appearances as a violinist, with the Elba Festival Orchestra. He was a frequent guest conductor of the Brussels Chamber Orchestra, the leader of the Arriaga String Quartet and of the Michael Guttman Tango Quartet.

In 2014 he was named director of the Symphony Napa Valley.

== Partial Discography ==
- Keyboard concertos in D minor and F minor, Partita No 1 & jazz arrangements.
- Summer: A Collection of Seasonal Classics
- Capriccio Hassidico
