= Eric Fischl =

American painter and sculptor

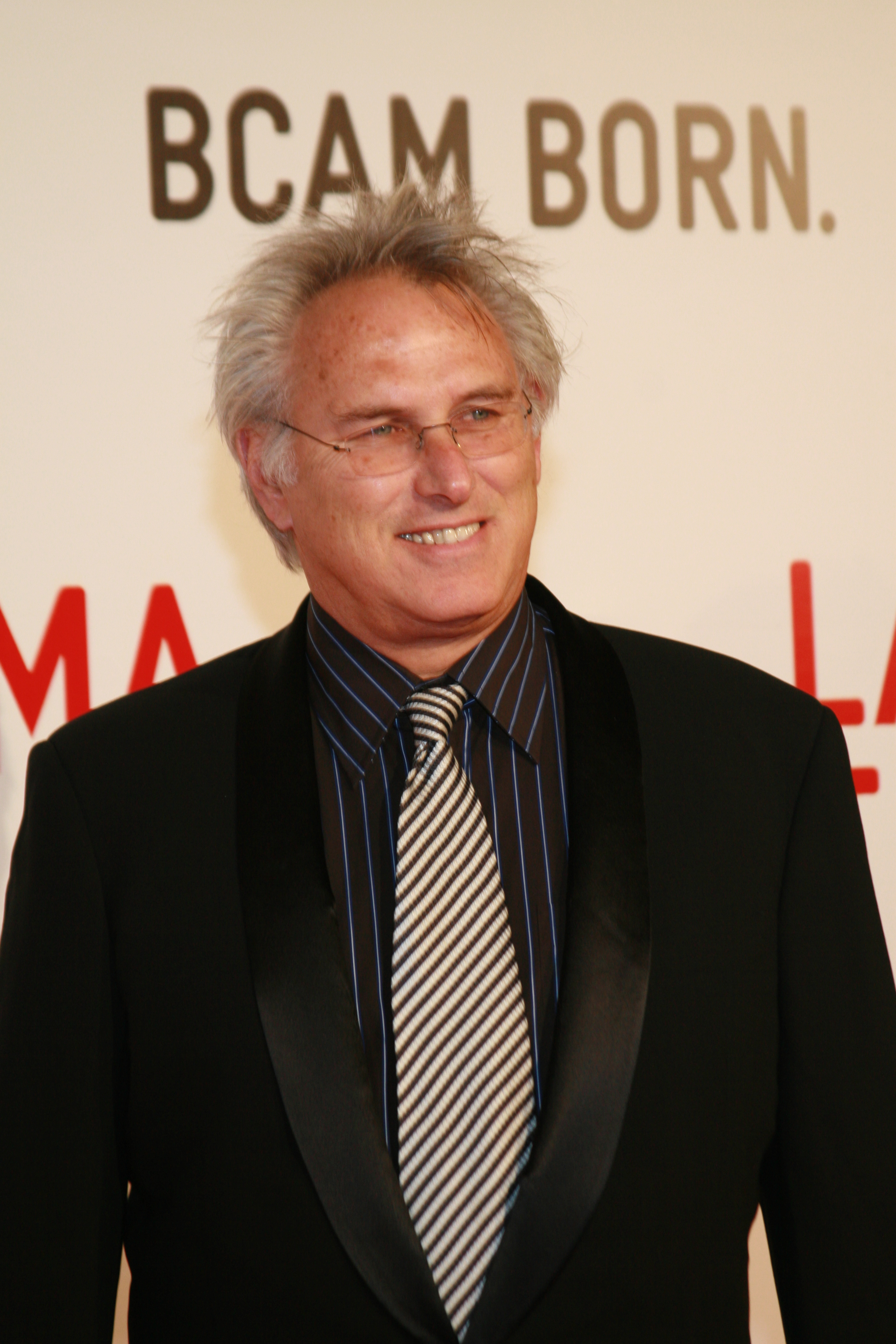
- Fischl, 2008
- Born: March 9, 1948 (age 78); New York City, US
- Education: California Institute of the Arts
- Known for: Painting, Sculpture, printmaking
- Movement: Realism, Neo-expressionism
- Spouse: April Gornik
- Website: Eric Fischl official website

Eric Fischl (born March 9, 1948) is an American painter, sculptor, printmaker, draughtsman and educator. He is known for his paintings depicting American suburbia from the 1970s and 1980s.

== Life ==
Fischl was born in New York City and grew up on suburban Long Island; his family moved to Phoenix, Arizona, in 1967. His art education began at Phoenix College for two years, followed with studying at Arizona State University. Followed by studying at the California Institute of the Arts in Valencia, California, where he received a B.F.A. in 1972. He then moved to Chicago, taking a job as a guard at the Museum of Contemporary Art.

Between 1974 and 1978 he taught at the Nova Scotia College of Art and Design in Halifax, Nova Scotia. It was at this school where he met his future wife, painter April Gornik. In 1978, he moved back to New York City.

Fischl is a trustee and senior critic at the New York Academy of Art and President of the Academy of the Arts at Guild Hall of East Hampton. In addition to receiving Guild Hall's Academy of the Art's Lifetime Achievement Award in 1994, Fischl was extended the honor of membership to the American Academy of Arts and Letters in 2006.

== Work ==
Bad boy (1981), oil on linen, 66 by 96 inches (1.7 m × 2.4 m) by Eric Fischl

Fischl has embraced the description of himself as a painter of the suburbs, not generally considered appropriate subject matter prior to his generation. Some of Fischl's earlier works have a theme of adolescent sexuality and voyeurism, such as Sleepwalker (1979) which depicts an adolescent boy masturbating into a children's pool. Bad Boy (1981) and Birthday Boy (1983) both depict young boys looking at older women shown in provocative poses on a bed. In Bad Boy, the subject is surreptitiously slipping his hand into a purse. In Birthday Boy, the child is depicted naked on the bed.

Art critic John Russell reviewed a 1986 retrospective of 28 Fischl paintings at the Whitney Museum, comparing him to Degas in The New York Times, "[Degas] sets up a charged situation with his incomparable subtlety of insight and characterization, and then he goes away and leaves us to figure it out as best we can. That is the tactic of Fischl, too, though the society with which he deals has an unstructured brutality and a violence never far from release that are very different from the nicely calibrated cruelties that Degas recorded."

In 2002, Fischl collaborated with the Museum Haus Esters in Krefeld, Germany. Haus Esters is a 1928 home, designed by Mies van der Rohe in 1928 to be a private home. It now houses changing exhibitions. Fischl refurbished it as a home (though not particularly in Bauhaus style) and hired models who, for several days, pretended to be a couple who lived there. He took 2,000 photographs, which he reworked digitally and used as the basis for a series of paintings, one of which, the monumental Krefeld Redux, Bedroom #6 (Surviving the Fall Meant Using You for Handholds) (2004) was purchased by Paul Allen featured in the 2006 Double Take Exhibit at Experience Music Project, where it was juxtaposed with a much smaller Degas pastel.

Fischl also collaborated with Jamaica Kincaid, E. L. Doctorow and Frederic Tuten combining paintings and sketches with literary works. Composer Bruce Wolosoff was inspired by Fischl's watercolors to compose "The Loom" for the classical ensemble Eroica Trio.

Eric Fischl is represented by Skarstedt Gallery, New York.

From November 7, 2025 - June 14, 2026, the Phoenix Art Museum exhibited Eric Fischl: Stories Told. It featured 40 large-scale paintings Fischl created over the last 5 decades.

== Personal life ==
For many years Fischl worked and resided in New York City, with his studio located in Tribeca. In 2000, he moved to Sag Harbor, Long Island, New York, with his wife, landscapist April Gornik, where they share a home and matching studios.

In Sag Harbor, Fischl and Gornik led fundraising efforts to renovate the Sag Harbor Cinema, which burned in December 2016, into a cultural center and renovate an abandoned Methodist Church into an artist residency and exhibition space called The Church. Both venues opened in 2021.

== Art market ==
On May 10, 2022, Fischl's painting The Old Man's Boat and the Old Man's Dog (1982) sold by $4,140,000, against an estimate of $2,000,000-3,000,000, more than doubling his previous record, at Christie's.

== Public collections ==
Fischl's work can be found in several art museums across the world, such as the Art Institute of Chicago, The Broad, in Los Angeles, the Dallas Museum of Art, the Museum of Modern Art, in New York City, the Solomon R. Guggenheim Museum, in New York City, the National Gallery of Art, in Washington, D.C., the Hirshhorn Museum and Sculpture Garden, in Washington, D.C., the Smithsonian American Art Museum, in Washington, D.C., the Philadelphia Museum of Art, the National Gallery of Canada, in Ottawa, the Louisiana Museum of Modern Art, in Copenhagen, the Musée National d'Art Moderne, Centre Pompidou, in Paris, and the Art Gallery of New South Wales, in Sydney, among many others.
