= Stephanie Sant'Ambrogio =

American violinist

Stephanie Sant'Ambrogio (born July 15, 1960) is an American violinist. She was professor of violin and viola at the University of Nevada, Reno and served as concertmaster of the San Antonio Symphony from 1994 until 2007, during which time she appeared annually as soloist with the orchestra. Her father is cellist John Sant'Ambrogio.
