= Eroica Trio =

American musical ensemble

The Eroica Trio is an American piano trio consisting of Erika Nickrenz, piano; Sara Parkins, violin; and Sara Sant'Ambrogio, cello.

The trio take their name from Beethoven's Eroica Symphony. They have toured and recorded widely, and released six recordings for Angel/EMI Classics Records, garnering multiple Grammy Award nominations.

The founding members of the trio were Nickrenz, Sant'Ambrogio, and Adela Peña. They were all trained at the Juilliard School. In addition to being accomplished musicians, the Eroica Trio have attracted attention in the chamber music world from some as physically attractive, stylishly dressed women.

The trio took first prize in the prestigious Walter W. Naumburg Chamber Music Competition in 1991. Their first compact disc recording Eroica Trio won National Public Radio's 1997 Performance Today Award for "Debut Recording of the Year."

In addition to touring with a varied piano trio repertoire, the Eroica Trio often appear in concert with major orchestras performing the Beethoven Triple Concerto.

The Eroica Trio commissioned a triple concerto by American composer Kevin Kaska. It was premiered by the Saint Louis Symphony Orchestra in November 2001. They have also commissioned several works from American composer Bruce Wolosoff, including "The Loom," inspired by the watercolors of Eric Fischl; that work was released on the Montage Music Society's album Creating Music Inspired by Visual Art.
