= Évelyne Crochet =

Franco-American classical pianist

Évelyne Crochet (born 1934) is a Franco-American classical pianist.

== Biography ==
Crochet was born in Paris, where she studied piano with Yvonne Lefébure and Nadia Boulanger at the Conservatoire de Paris. She also worked with Marcel Samuel-Rousseau, Pierre Pasquier, Pierre Petit, Norbert Dufourcq. In 1953, she won first prize at the Conservatoire. She continued her piano studies with Edwin Fischer and Rudolf Serkin. At the international competition in Geneva in 1956, she won the first prize, and was among the winners of the International Tchaikovsky Competition in Moscow in 1958. In Bern, Rudolf Serkin heard her playing and invited her to follow his masterclasses. Crochet accepted Serkin's offer, then moved to the United States in 1958. As a soloist, she has performed in numerous American and European concert halls, including the Carnegie Hall at New York, the Symphony Hall at Boston, the Symphony Center of Chicago, the Royal Festival Hall in London, the Concertgebouw at Amsterdam, and the Konzerthaus, Vienna. Crochet worked for many years with the Boston Symphony Orchestra, then with many other orchestras in Germany, among others, with the Bavarian Radio Symphony Orchestra and the NDR Radiophilharmonie. As a university professor, she has taught at various American universities (Brandeis, Rutgers, Boston, the Georgia State University and the New England Conservatory of Music in Boston).

Her repertoire spans three centuries, from baroque to modern. She has played among others the piano works of Gabriel Fauré and in 2006, recorded The Well-Tempered Clavier, parts I and II. Music critic Richard Dyer in The Boston Globe compared her interpretation with those of Daniel Barenboim and Vladimir Ashkenazy, and defined it as "the most satisfactory" of all contemporary interpretations.

Crochet currently resides in New York City.

She has a son, Rafael, and is the aunt of singer Axel Bauer.

== Discography ==
- Bach, J. S., The Well-Tempered Clavier: 24 Preludes and Fugues, BWV 846-869, Book I, 24 Preludes and Fugues, BWV 870-893, Book II Recorded at the Academy of the Arts and Letters in New York City, Elite Recordings, Producers/Engineer: Joanna Nickrenz, Marc Aubort; Editing: Joanna Nickrenz Bach, J. S. (Mercury) Organ Transcriptions: by Liszt, Busoni, Crochet, Prelude and Fugue in B minor, S. 544 (Liszt) , Prelude and Fugue in A minor, S. 543 (Liszt), 3 Chorale Preludes:; Wachet auf, ruft uns die Stimme (Crochet) , Nun komm, der Heiden Heiland (Busoni), O Mensch, bewein dein Sünde gross (Crochet) Bach, J. S., The Goldberg Variations, BWV 988 Recorded at the Di Menna Center in New York City, Elite Recordings, Producer/Engineer: Marc Aubort, Editing: Marc Aubort, Hsilling Chang 2012
- Beethoven, L.v. (USSR label) Piano Sonata No. 31 in A-flat major, Opus 110,
- Fauré, G. (Vol 1) (vol 2) (Vox) Complete piano works: (6 CDs), vol I;CD1: Theme and Variations, Op.73 Barcarolle No. 1, Op. 26 Barcarolle No. 2, Op. 41 Barcarolle No. 3, Op.42 Barcarolle No. 4, Op.44 Barcarolle No. 5, Op. 66 Barcarolle No. 6, Op. 70 CD 2: Barcarolle No.7, Op. 90 Barcarolle No.8, Op.96 Barcarolle No.9, Op.101 Barcarolle No. 10, Op. 104, no. 2 Barcarolle No. 11, Op. 105 Barcarolle No. 12, Op. 106 Barcarolle No. 13, Op. 116 Valse-Caprice No.1, in A major, Op. 30 CD 3: Valses-Caprices (cont.): No. 2, Op. 38 No. 3, Op. 59 No. 4, Op. 62 Pièces Brèves, Op. 84: Capriccio in E♭ major Fantaisie in A♭ major Fugue in A minor Adagietto in E minor Improvisation in C# minor Fugue in E minor Allègresse in C major Nocturne No.8, in D major vol II, CD 1: Preludes, Op.103: No. 1, in D♭ major No. 2, in C# minor No. 3, in G minor No. 4, in F major No. 5, in D minor No. 6, in E♭ minor No. 7, in A major No. 8, in C minor No. 9, in E minor Impromptus: No. 1, in E♭ major No. 2, in F minor No. 3, in A♭ major No. 4, in D♭ major No. 5, in F# minor CD 2: Nocturnes: No. 1, in E♭ minor, Op. 25 No. 2, in B major, Op. 33 No. 2 No. 3, in A♭ major, Op. 33 No. 3 No. 4, in E♭ major, Op. 36 No. 5, in B♭ major, Op. 37 No. 6, in D♭ major, Op. 63 No. 7, in C# minor, Op. 74 No. 8: see Vol 1, CD 3, track 2 CD 3: Nocturnes: (continued) No. 9, in B minor, Op. 97 No. 10, in E minor, Op. 99 No. 11, in F# minor, Op. 104 no. 1 No. 12, in E minor, Op. 107 No, 13, in B minor, Op. 119 Romances sans Paroles Op. 17: No. 1, in A♭ major No. 2, in A minor No. 3 in A minor Marzurka Op. 32
- Mozart, W. A. (USSR label) Piano Sonata in A minor, K. 310,
- Satie, E. (Philips) Eighteen Piano Pieces (world premiere) Nouvelles Pièces Froides, Effronterie, Désespoir agréable, Songe creux, Profondeur, Prélude canin, Avant-dernières Pensées, 2 Rêveries Nocturnes, Première Pensée Rose-Croix, Petite Ouverture à danser, Les Trois Valses distinguées du Précieux dégoûté, 6 Gnossiennes, 3 Gymnopédies,
- Schubert, F. (Philips) Piano Sonata in A minor, Opus 143, Three Pieces, Opus Posthumous, Four-Hand Duets: (with Alfred Brendel) (Vox, Decca, Turnabout), Fantasia in F minor, Op. 103, Allegro in A minor, "Lebensstürme" Op. 144, Grand Duo Sonata in C major, Op. 140.
