= Markand Thakar =

American conductor (born 1955)

Markand Thakar (born 1955, New York City) is an American conductor and music director emeritus of the Baltimore Chamber Orchestra (BCO).

== Biography ==
From the age of six, Markand Thakar attended the Juilliard School's Pre-College Division, where he was a piano student of Leonora B. Pardee and a violin student of Christine Dethier. He also studied composition privately with Suzanne Bloch and Noah Creshevsky. Additional instrumental studies during summers at The Quartet Program included violin with Charles Castleman, viola with Heidi Castleman and Paul Doktor, and chamber music with Josef Gingold, Norman Carol, Renato Bonancini, Samuel Mayes, and the Tokyo Quartet.

Thakar earned the Bachelor of Music degree in 1975 from Juilliard, with a major in composition as a student of Vincent Persichetti and Milton Babbitt, and a minor in violin performance as a student of Christine Dethier. After two years of private study of counterpoint and conducting with Jacques-Louis Monod, he attended Columbia University in 1977, earning the Master of Arts degree in music theory in 1979. During those two years he was music director of the Barnard-Columbia Philharmonia (the student-run chamber orchestra), and also studied oboe with Ronald Roseman.

Thakar was awarded a Fulbright Fellowship for study of conducting in Romania for the 1979–80 season. He was a special student at the Ciprian Porumbescu Conservatory of Music in Bucharest, and apprentice to Mircea Cristescu, permanent conductor of the "Georges Enescu" State Philharmonic of Bucharest. He conducted concerts with the State Philharmonics of Sibiu and Satu Mare, and conducted the Romanian premiere of Stravinsky's L'histoire du Soldat.

Following seminal studies with Sergiu Celibidache in Munich, Thakar spent two years conducting the youth orchestras of Greensboro and Chapel Hill, NC, and then enrolled as a doctoral candidate at the University of Cincinnati – College-Conservatory of Music. He earned the Doctor of Musical Arts degree in orchestral conducting in 1987, with a dissertation titled The Transcendent Musical Experience: As Permitted by the Structural Harmonic Activity of Sonata Form Movements.

Thakar was Director of Orchestras (1985–87) at the Penn State University School of Music, Director of Orchestral Activities (1987–92) at the Ohio University School of Music as a tenured associate professor, and Director of Orchestral Activities (1992–94) at the Harid Conservatory in Boca Raton, FL. After three years as Associate Conductor of the Colorado Symphony in Denver, Thakar joined the conducting staff of the New York Philharmonic, where he conducted subscription, outdoor, and education concerts.

In 2001 he became music director of the Duluth Superior Symphony Orchestra, in 2004 he added the music directorship of the Baltimore Chamber Orchestra, and in 2008 was named principal conductor of the Duluth Festival Opera. Following a remarkably successful 12-year run as music director in Duluth and 19-year tenure in Baltimore, which saw record audience and income growth, both organizations honored Thakar by naming him Music Director Emeritus.

As a guest conductor Thakar has appeared with orchestras across the United States and Canada, including those of Washington, DC (National Symphony Orchestra), San Antonio, Charlotte, Winnipeg, Edmonton, Calgary, Richmond, Charlotte, Portland, Wichita, Ann Arbor, Flint, Sarasota, among many others, and with the Baltimore Opera Theatre and Opera on the James.

== Publications ==
On the Principles and Practice of Conducting (2016), issued by the University of Rochester Press.

Looking for the "Harp" Quartet: An Investigation into Musical Beauty (2011), issued by the University of Rochester Press in the Eastman Studies in Music series. Lauded as "A 225-page tour de force," (Midwest Book Review) the book is a comprehensive examination of the experience of musical beauty: what it is, and how the composer, performer, and listener each contributes.

Counterpoint: Fundamentals of Music Making (1990), issued by Yale University Press, in Italian by Rugginenti Editore of Milan, and in Czech by Nakladatelství Akademie múzických umění. The book uses species counterpoint to lead to an understanding of how different successions of tones, and different inflections of the performance, lead to different quality experiences.

"Remembrance of Things Future" (written with the assistance of Paul Henry Smith), presented at the First Symposium on Phenomenology and the Fine Arts sponsored by the World Phenomenology Association, Harvard University, April 1987. The paper explored the structure of the listener's consciousness in the experience of musical beauty.

== Recordings ==
- IGNAZ PLEYEL Symphonies Concertantes, Violin Concerto in D

David Perry, violin; with Isabella Lippi, violin, and Victoria Chiang, viola

Baltimore Chamber Orchestra

NAXOS 8.570320

- JONATHAN LESHNOFF Violin Concerto, Distant Reflections

Charles Wetherbee, violin

Baltimore Chamber Orchestra

NAXOS American Classics 8.559398

- KARL STAMITZ and ANTON HOFFMEISTER Viola Concertos

Victoria Chiang, viola

Baltimore Chamber Orchestra

NAXOS 8.572162
