= Melia Watras =

- Genre: Classical
- Occupations: Violist, composer, professor
- Instrument: Viola
- Website: http://www.meliawatras.com

Melia Watras is an American violist, composer and professor of viola. She is a soloist, chamber musician and recording artist, who has commissioned, premiered and recorded numerous new compositions, and appeared at venues such as Carnegie Hall, Weill Recital Hall and Alice Tully Hall. Her compositions have been performed in the United States and Europe. Educated at Indiana University and the Juilliard School, Watras has been on the faculty of the University of Washington in Seattle since the fall of 2004, where she was Chair of Strings for 13 years.

== Education ==
Watras attended Indiana University School of Music, where she studied with Abraham Skernick and Distinguished Professor Atar Arad, earning bachelor's and master's degrees and the prestigious Performer's Certificate. While at Indiana University, she served as Arad's teaching assistant. She studied chamber music at the Juilliard School, while also teaching as an assistant to the Juilliard String Quartet.

== Career ==
=== Performing and recording artist ===
Watras's lauded work as a recording artist has been recognized by publications such as Gramophone (which hailed her as “an artist of commanding and poetic personality”), The Strad, ("staggeringly virtuosic" and “a beautiful celebration of 21st-century viola music” ) and Strings (“Watras is a young player in possession of stunning virtuosic talent and deserving of the growing acclaim”). She has been heard on numerous radio programs, including NPR's All Things Considered and Performance Today, and a live performance for the Danish Broadcasting Corporation.

Composers that have written works especially for Watras include: Alessandra Barrett, Charles Corey, Brent Michael Davids, Joël-François Durand, Orlando Jacinta García, Richard Karpen, Garth Knox, Mary Kouyoumdjian, Leilehua Lanzilotti, Shih-Wei Lo, Sandesh Nagaraj, Juan Pampin, Joshua Parmenter, Shulamit Ran, Jonathan Rodriquez Grijalva, Kathryn Sullivan, Heinrich Taube, Breana Tavaglione, Diane Thome, Cuong Vu, Andrew Waggoner, Anna Weesner, Frances White, Bonnie Whiting and Wei Yang. As a soloist and chamber musician, Watras has given world premieres of works by Atar Arad, Charles Corey, John Corigliano, Brent Michael Davids, Tina Davidson, Alexander De Varon, Joël-François Durand, Orlando Jacinta García, Jesse Jones, Richard Karpen, Garth Knox, Michael Jinsoo Lim, Shih-Wei Lo, Patrick Long, Eric Maestri, Anthony Moore, Jeffrey Mumford, Sandesh Nagaraj, Ichiro Nodaira, Juan Pampin, Joshua Parmenter, Robert Pound, Shulamit Ran, Jonathan Rodgriguez Grijalva, Adam Silverman, Kathryn Sullivan, Sir John Taverner, Heinrich Taube, Breana Tavaglione, Diane Thome, Dan Visconti, Cuong Vu, Andrew Waggoner, Melia Watras, Anna Weesner, Frances White, Theodore Wiprud, Tamar Witkin, Wei Yang and Mischa Zupko.

For twenty years, Watras concertized worldwide and recorded extensively as violist of the renowned Corigliano Quartet, which she co-founded. The ensemble's album on the Naxos label was honored as one of the Ten Best Classical Recordings of the Year by The New Yorker.

In 2024, the American Viola Society presented Watras with the Maurice W. Riley Award for her distinguished contributions to the viola as a performer, composer, teacher and leader.

=== Composer ===
Watras's compositions have been performed in US cities such as New York, Chicago, Los Angeles, Seattle, Bloomington (IN), and countries including Denmark, Spain, Switzerland, and Wales. She has been commissioned by Avalon String Quartet, the American Viola Society, Tekla Cunningham (baroque violin), Mark Fewer (violin), Rachel Lee Priday (violin), Michael Jinsoo Lim (violin), Sæunn Thorsteinsdóttir (cello), Cristina Valdés (piano), Rose Wollman (viola), and has had works performed by artists such as Atar Arad (viola), Galia Arad (voice), Winston Choi (piano), Catherine Connors (voice), Charles Corey (Harmonic Canon and Bass Marimba), Frequency Ensemble, Manuel Guillén (violin), Yura Lee (violin), Tawnya Popoff (viola), Carrie Henneman Shaw (voice), Bonnie Whiting (percussion) and Vina Vu Valdés (voice). Her music has been heard on National Public Radio's Performance Today, and can be found on her albums The almond tree duos;Play/Write; String Masks; 3 Songs for Bellows, Buttons and Keys; Firefly Songs; Schumann Resonances and 26. Watras's adaptation of John Corigliano's Fancy on a Bach Air for viola is published by G. Schirmer, Inc. and can be heard on her Viola Solo album.

=== Professor ===
Watras serves as Professor of Viola at the University of Washington. She has given viola, chamber music and improvisation classes throughout the United States and abroad, at schools such as Indiana University, Cleveland Institute of Music, Strasbourg Conservatoire (France), and Chosun University (South Korea). She has returned on a number of occasions to her alma mater, Indiana, to teach as a guest professor.
