= Lark Quartet (ensemble) =

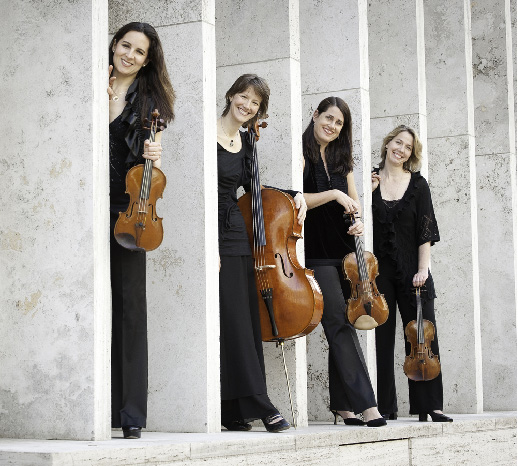
- The Lark Quartet in 2011

Background information
- Also known as: The Lark Quartet
- Origin: New York, Minnesota
- Genres: Classical
- Occupation: String quartet
- Instruments: 2 violins, 1 viola, 1 cello
- Years active: 1985-2019
- Labels: Decca, Bridge, Endeavor
- Members: Deborah Buck; Basia Danilow; Kathryn Lockwood; Caroline Stinson
- Past members: Laura Sewell; Anna Kruger; Robyn Mayforth; Kay Stern; Eva Gruesser; Jennifer Orchard; Diane Pascal; Danielle Farina; Astrid Schween; Harumi Rhodes; Lisa Lee
- Website: www.larkquartet.com

The Lark Quartet was a New York-based, all female string quartet that operated from 1985 to 2019. It is acknowledged for its distinguished contribution to the string quartet repertoire, commissioning new works from some of America's most celebrated composers. Most notably, Aaron Jay Kernis' two string quartets: Quartet no. 1 Musica celestis and Quartet no. 2 Musica instrumentalis, which received the Pulitzer Prize in 1998. The Lark Quartet served as Quartet-in-Residence at the University of Massachusetts Amherst from 2004 to 2008 and has recorded numerous albums on multiple labels including Decca/Argo, Arabesque, Bridge, ERI, Endeavor and Koch.

== Final roster of musicians ==
=== 1st violin ===
Deborah Buck (born September 9, 1971, in Mountain View, California) is an American violinist who has built a diverse musical career, appearing with artists like Itzhak Perlman and Erykah Badu. Having served as the tenured concertmaster of the Brooklyn Philharmonic since 2009, Deborah has recorded for Motion Picture, Television, and was the soloist in Turner Classics, The Scarlet Letter. Her recitals have been heard in broadcasts around the U.S., and she has been a soloist with orchestras including the Little Orchestra Society, Brooklyn Philharmonic, and the West Virginia Symphony Orchestra. Deborah serves as assistant professor of violin at SUNY Purchase Conservatory of Music and serves as the co-executive director of the Kinhaven Music School. Ms. Buck performs on a violin by Vincenzo Postiglione, graciously on loan by Ray and Marcia Corwin.

=== 2nd violin ===
Basia Danilow (born January 23 in Brooklyn, New York) is a diverse violinist who engages in chamber music, recording, orchestral and solo performances. She has appeared in recital at Lincoln Center, Weill Recital Hall at Carnegie Hall, Merkin Concert Hall and the Kosciuszko Foundation as well as in Yugoslavia and Russia. Basia is concertmaster of the Princeton Symphony Orchestra, a regular with the Orchestra of St. Luke's and the Metropolitan Opera Orchestra. She has recorded for the Sony, Atlantic, RCA Victor Red Seal and Bridge labels and her radio and television broadcasts include WQXR, NPR's Performance Today, Vermont Public Radio and PBS. Basia has appeared at the Caramoor Summer Music Festival, Lincoln Center Festival, Central Vermont Chamber Music Festival, Windham, Music Festival of the Hamptons, the International Summer Institute at the Moscow Conservatory.

=== Viola ===
Kathryn Lockwood (born January 1, 1969, in Brisbane, Australia) has built an international career as a chamber musician, soloist and teacher. A founding member of the Pacifica Quartet, Kathryn is currently the violist of duoJalal - an unusual viola and percussion duo with her husband Yousif Sheronick. She has performed regularly with the Camerata of St. John's, the Broyhill Chamber Ensemble, at the Elm City ChamberFest the Telluride ChamberFest. Kathryn is a faculty member at the University of Massachusetts Amherst, Montclair State University and is a regular guest teacher at her alma mater, the Queensland Conservatorium Griffith University. Ms Lockwood plays an unknown Italian viola from the 18th Century Brescian School.

=== Cello ===
Caroline Stinson (born April 20, 1975, in Edmonton, Alberta) is a Canadian soloist, recitalist and chamber musician for concerts of traditional and contemporary repertoire. Having appeared as a soloist at Museum of Modern Art's Summergarden Series, (Le) Poisson Rouge and Bargemusic in New York City; Cité de la musique Strasbourg and the Lucerne Festival in Europe, and the Centennial Centre and Winspear Halls in Canada. Her début CD, Lines, was released in 2011 on Albany Records and she has over a dozen chamber music recordings to her credit. Ms. Stinson is a member of the new music and improvisation group, the Open End Ensemble, Co-Artistic Director of the Weekend of Chamber Music (based in the Catskills and is on the faculty of the Juilliard School. Caroline performs on a Thomas Dodd cello from 1800.

== History and activities ==
=== Origins ===
The four women who began the Lark String Quartet in 1985 were Kay Stern & Robin Mayforth on violin, Anna Kruger on viola and Laura Sewell on cello. Laura was the first to imagine the quartet into existence. She had just returned home upon graduating to live with her parents in Minnesota. Laura established a non for profit status and a board before she'd fully enlisted personnel but quickly set up a meeting with Anna Kruger in New York who introduced her to Kay and Robin. Soon after, Laura applied for a Self magazine "Fresh Start" competition geared towards women who were starting over with a new beginning in their life. She won and the magazine took on the whole quartet. SELF paid for the quartet's NEW YORK debut.

=== Lark About Town (LAT) ===
A concert series that pairs private salon evenings with free concerts for families and underserved communities. The goal of the program is to provide an intimate and unpredictable live music experience. :The series has two principle incarnations: Outreach Concerts, which are free family concerts designed to bring live music to people of all ages, all communities, with a particular focus on underserved neighborhoods in the trial-state area AND the Salon Concert Series, which is house concerts in the New York Metropolitan area.

== Commissioned works ==
- William Bolcom: Billy in the Darbies with Stephen Salters, Baritone
- Jennifer Higdon: Scenes from a Poet's Dream with Gary Graffman, Piano
- Aaron Jay Kernis: String Quartet No. 2 Musica Instrumentalis (1997) Awarded the Pulitzer Prize
- Paul Moravec: Piano Quintet with Jeremy Denk, Piano
- Nico Muhly: Big Time with Yousif Sheronick, Percussion
- Peter Schickele: String Quartet No. 2 "In Memorium"
- Julia Wolfe: String Quartet Early that summer (1993)

== 30th anniversary season ==
Lark presented a series of programs during the 2016-2017 season to celebrate their 30th Anniversary. They performed their favorite traditional repertoire together with new works commissioned for the anniversary. The final commission invited the original Larks (Laura, Anna, Robyn & Kay) to join the present Larks to play a string octet by Andrew Waggoner. The first presented in October 2016 was a percussion quintet by Kenji Bunch with Lark's longtime collaborator Yousif Sheronick, percussion. Anna Weesner is up next to write a clarinet quintet for the Lark Quartet and Todd Palmer. Two exciting string quartets by Stephen Hartke and John Harbison round out the commissions.

== Recordings ==
The Lark Quartet has recorded numerous albums in their 30-year history. These include some of the most significant works of the 20th century for string quartet. Lark has recorded for the Decca/Argo, Arabesque, Bridge, ERI, Endeavor, Koch, Point and New World labels. Recordings include:

- Alexander Borodin - String Quartets Nos 1 & 2, Arabesque Records,
- Schoenberg & Zemlinsky - Schoenberg: String Quartet In D Minor, Opus 7, Zemlinsky: String Quartet No. 4, Opus 25
- Robert Schumann - Quartet In A Minor, Op. 41, No. 1, Quartet In A Major, Op. 41, No. 3
- Alfred Schnittke - String Quartets Nos. 2 & 3, Piano Quintet
- Peter Schickele - On a Lark: Sextet, Quintet No. 2 for Piano and Strings (with Robert Rinehart - viola, Julia Lichten - cello, Peter Schickele - piano)
- Aaron Jay Kernis - Quartet Nos. 1 & 2
- Amy Beach - Sonata for violin & piano in A minor, Op. 34, String Quartet (in one movement; originally Op. 79), Op. 89, Piano Trio, Op. 150 (with Joanne Polk - piano)
- Klap Ur Handz - Peter Schikele: String Quartet No. 2; Paul Moravec: Atmosfera a Villa Aurelia, Vince & Jan: 1945; George Gershwin: Five Songs; Daniel Bernard Roumain DBR: String Quartet No. 5, Klap Ur Handz REMIX (with Yousif Sheronick - percussion)
- Jennifer Higdon, An Exaltation of Larks - Scenes from the Poetâs Dreams, Light Refracted, An Exaltation of Larks (with Gary Graffman - piano, Blair McMillen - piano, Todd Palmer - clarinet)
- Composing America - John Adams: from the Book of Alleged Dances (arr. Yousif Sheronick); Copland: Two Pieces; William Bolcom: Billy in the Darbies; Paul Moravec: Piano Quintet (with Jeremy Denk - piano, Stephen Salters - baritone, Yousif Sheronick - percussion)
- Works For String Quartet And Orchestra - Handel, Schoenberg, Spohr, Elgar (with Jean-Louis LeRoux - conductor, San Francisco Ballet Orchestra)
- Julia Wolfe - Early That Summer

== Awards ==
- 1997: Pulitzer Prize for Quartet no. 1 Musica celestis; Quartet no. 2 Musica instrumentalis by Aaron Jay Kernis
- 2004-08: Quartet-in-Residence at the University of Massachusetts in Amherst

== Resources ==
- Hill, Brad (2006) American Popular Music: Classical, Library of Congress, ISBN 0-8160-5311-1
