= Robert Mann =

American musician, composer and conductor (1920–2018)

- Born: Robert Nathaniel Mann; July 19, 1920; Portland, Oregon, U.S.
- Died: January 1, 2018 (aged 97); Manhattan, New York, U.S.
- Education: Portland Youth Philharmonic; Juilliard School
- Occupations: Composer, violinist, educator
- Years active: 1933–2018
- Known for: Founder of the Juilliard String Quartet

Robert Nathaniel Mann (July 19, 1920 – January 1, 2018) was a violinist, composer, conductor, and founding member of the Juilliard String Quartet, as well as a faculty member at the Manhattan School of Music. Mann, the first violinist at Juilliard, served on the school's string quartet for over fifty years until his retirement in 1997.

Mann played and performed on many instruments, including those made by Antonio Stradivari and John Young. Mann was the subject of a 2014 documentary, titled Speak the Music.

== Biography ==
=== Early life ===
Mann was born and raised in Portland, Oregon. His father worked as a tailor and a grocer. Mann began his study of the violin at age nine; at 13, he was accepted into the class of Edouard Hurlimann, concertmaster of the Portland Symphony. He attended the Portland Youth Philharmonic, but had planned to become a forest ranger in his youth.

In 1938, at the age of eighteen, he moved to New York City to enroll in the Juilliard School, where he studied violin with Edouard Dethier, composition with Bernard Wagenaar and Stefan Wolpe, and conducting with Edgar Schenkman. Mann won the prestigious Naumburg Competition in 1941 and made his New York debut two days after the attack on Pearl Harbor. Shortly after his graduation from Juilliard, he was drafted into the US Army.

=== Career at Juilliard ===
At the invitation of Juilliard's president, William Schuman, Mann founded the Juilliard String Quartet in 1946 and served as the ensemble's first violinist until his retirement from the quartet in 1997. The quartet, which celebrated its golden jubilee during the 1996–97 season, had played approximately 5,000 concerts and performed more than 600 works, including some 100 premieres. Its discography includes recordings of more than 100 compositions. They have received three Grammy Awards for their recordings.

Mann composed more than 30 works for narrator with various instruments that he performed with his wife, the actress Lucy Rowan; several have been recorded on the Musical Heritage label. He also composed a Fantasy for Orchestra performed by Dimitri Mitropoulos with the New York Philharmonic, the Vienna Philharmonic, and at the Salzburg Festival; a Duo for Violin and Piano premiered at Carnegie Hall by Itzhak Perlman and Samuel Sanders; and a string quartet included in the repertoires of both the La Salle and the Concord string quartets. Other works include a Duo for Cello and Piano written for Joel Krosnick and Gilbert Kalish, a Concerto for Orchestra, and "Lament" for two solo violas and orchestra.

Robert Mann's solo discography includes Béla Bartók's Solo Violin Sonata, the Sonata No. 1 for violin and piano, and Contrasts; Beethoven's complete violin sonatas (with pianist Stephen Hough); many of Mozart's violin sonatas, with pianist Yefim Bronfman; and Elliott Carter's Duo for Violin and Piano, with Christopher Oldfather.

Mann conducted throughout his professional career; he led the Boston Symphony Orchestra in a Peter Bartók recording of Béla Bartók's Piano Concerto No. 1. He made his public debut as a conductor with the Seattle Symphony during the 1988-89 season, and conducted Mozart's Jupiter Symphony the following season in New York City.

In 1985 & 1994, he was a soloist with the Naumburg Orchestral Concerts, in the Naumburg Bandshell, Central Park, in the summer series. From 1999-2001, he conducted at the Naumburg Orchestral Concerts, in the Naumburg Bandshell, Central Park, in the summer series.

=== Other work ===
As a mentor to younger generations of string musicians, Mann worked intensively with the Alexander, American, Concord, Emerson, New World, Mendelssohn, Tokyo, Brentano, Lark, and St. Lawrence strings quartets, as well as with members of the Cleveland String Quartet and other ensembles. In later years, he expanded his teaching to include violin majors at the Juilliard School. Among his students were Juliette Kang, who won the Indianapolis International Violin Competition in 1994, and Mark Steinberg, the first violinist of the Brentano String Quartet.

Founder and first artistic director of the Ravinia Stean's Institute for Young Artists at Chicago's Ravinia Festival, Mann also served as chairman of the Chamber Music Panel of the National Endowment for the Arts. He was a member of the board of directors of the New York Philharmonic, and president of the Walter W. Naumburg Foundation. In 1990, Mann was honored as the recipient of the Chamber Music America Service Award and the annual award of the American String Teachers Association. He received honorary doctorates from the Manhattan School of Music, Oberlin College, Michigan State University, Earlham College, Jacksonville University, and the San Francisco Conservatory of Music.

Mann's son, Nicholas, a violinist and violist with whom the senior Mann often played duo recitals, is a founding member of the Mendelssohn String Quartet. His daughter, Lisa Mann Marotta, is a psychologist. Aerospace and biomedical engineering entrepreneur Alfred E. Mann was his brother.

In recognition of his contributions to the arts, Robert Mann was elected a Fellow of the American Academy of Arts and Sciences in April 1996.

Mann died on January 1, 2018.
