= Hasapi =

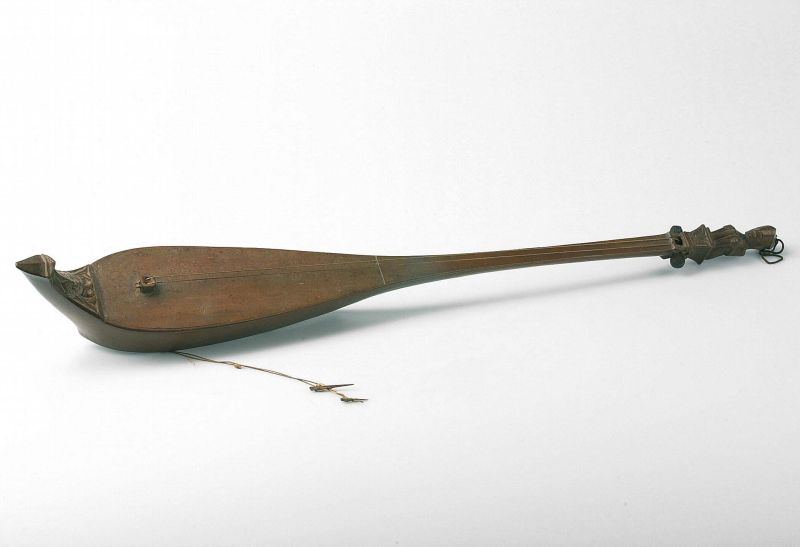
- A one-stringged hasapi

String instrument
- Classification: Stringed instrument
- Hornbostel–Sachs classification: 321.321

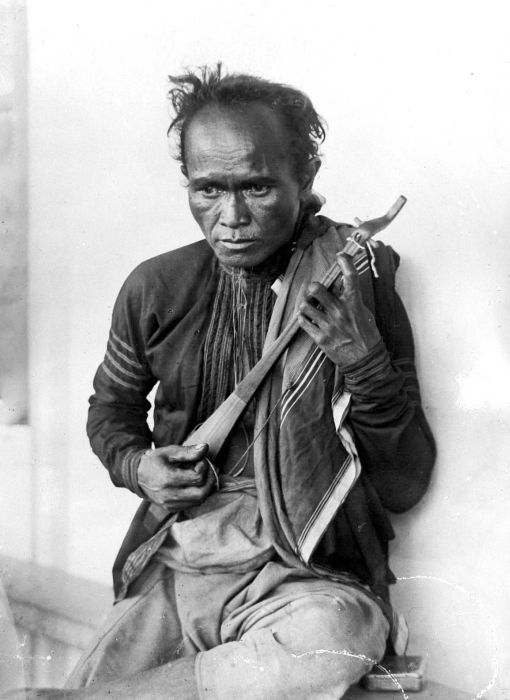
Renowned hasapi player Si Data of "Soerbakti, Karolanden," North Sumatra (1915-1920) by Tassilo Adam

Hasapi (Toba Batak: ᯂᯘᯇᯪ), also written as kacapi (Pakpak: ᯂᯘᯇᯪ), hapitan (Toba Batak: ᯂᯇᯪᯖᯉ᯲), and kulcapi (Karo: ᯂᯬᯞ᯳ᯠᯇᯫ), is a two-stringed lute played by the Batak people of the Indonesian island of Sumatra. The plucked instrument was used for Zere religious rituals and is now used as part of the orchestra accompanying the traveling theater Opera Batak.
