= Corigliano Quartet =

American string quartet

- Origin: United States
- Genres: Classical, contemporary
- Occupation: Chamber ensemble
- Years active: 1996 – present
- Members: Michael Jinsoo Lim, violin Elisa Barston, violin Melia Watras, viola Amy Sue Barston, violoncello
- Website: www.CoriglianoQuartet.com

The Corigliano Quartet is a classical music string quartet founded in 1996 with the blessing of the Pulitzer-, Grammy-, and Oscar-winning John Corigliano. "They are truly one of the great quartets of the new generation," said the composer. "Their fiery intensity, musical sensitivity, and bold programming make for an absolutely stunning concert experience." The group's dedication and passion for new works has made them one of the most sought after interpreters of contemporary music today. For their efforts in bringing new music to a wider audience, the quartet was recently presented with the ASCAP/CMA Award For Adventurous Programming.

== History ==
The Corigliano Quartet's repertoire ranges from classical to contemporary works, including three works by their namesake John Corigliano: String Quartet No. 1 "Farewell" (1995), Snapshot: Circa 1909 (2003), and Corigliano's string quartet arrangement of his A Black November Turkey (1972). The Corigliano Quartet has also been dedicated to the performance of music by younger, rising composers such as Shafer Mahoney, Adam Silverman and Jefferson Friedman, as well as modern masters like Wynton Marsalis, Ben Johnston, Roberto Carnevale and Elliott Carter.

Composed of violinists Michael Jinsoo Lim and Elisa Barston, who alternate at first violin, violist Melia Watras, and cellist Amy Sue Barston, the Corigliano Quartet rapidly climbed the ranks of the chamber music world. One year after its formation, the group drew the attention of Isaac Stern, who invited them to the Isaac Stern Chamber Music Workshop at Carnegie Hall. The next year, the Corigliano won the Chamber Music Yellow Springs Competition and followed that up by winning both First Prize in the Senior Wind Division and Grand Prize at the 1999 Fischoff National Chamber Music Competition.

The group has performed in many of the nation's leading music centers, including Carnegie Hall, Weill Recital Hall, Alice Tully Hall, Merkin Hall, the Kennedy Center Lincoln Center's "Great Performers" series, and the Corcoran Gallery. Recent performances have taken the Corigliano to Baltimore, Boston, Chicago, Cincinnati, Detroit, Houston, Indianapolis, Los Angeles, New York, and Washington, DC. They have also made appearances in Italy, Mexico, and Korea, where they gave the Korean premiere of Corigliano's Farewell Quartet. They have been heard in numerous radio broadcasts, including NPR's All Things Considered, and WFMT-Chicago's Live From Studio One. The group's festival appearances include performances at the Ravinia Festival, the Aspen Music Festival, the Great Lakes Chamber Music Festival, Madeline Island Chamber Music Festival, Festival de Música de Cámara de San Miguel de Allende in Mexico, and Strings in the Mountains.

The Corigliano Quartet has held residencies at the Juilliard School, where they served as the teaching assistants to the Juilliard String Quartet; Indiana University, where they served on the faculty as visiting lecturers; Dickinson College, and the New York Youth Orchestra Chamber Music Program. Under the mentorship of Atar Arad, the group formed while its members were students at Indiana. The Corigliano has recorded for Naxos, CRI, Albany, Aguava New Music and Bayer Records.

== Members ==
- Elisa Barston - violin
- Amy Sue Barston - cello
- Michael Jinsoo Lim - violin
- Melia Watras - viola

== Discography ==
- 2007 Music by John Corigliano and Jefferson Friedman. Naxos Records

John Corigliano: String Quartet (Farewell); Black November Turkey; Snapshot: Circa 1909; Jefferson Friedman: String Quartet No. 2

- 2004 Movement for string quartet on Beata Moon: earthshine. BiBimBop Records
- 2004 the promise of the far horizon on Jeffrey Mumford: the promise of the far horizon. Albany Records
- 2002 String Quartet on Atar Arad: Sonata for Viola Solo and String Quartet. RIAX Records
- 2001 Legacy: Two Movements for String Quartet on Andrew Waggoner: Legacy. CRI Records
- 2000 Nightshade on Cary Boyce: Itineraries of the Night. Aguava New Music
- 2000 Dawnen Grey on The Music of Frederick Fox, Volume 2. Indiana University School of Music
- 1999 Quintet for Clarinet and Strings (with James Campbell, clarinet) on Bernard Heiden: Chamber Music. Bayer Records
