= Juilliard String Quartet =

String quartet at the Juilliard School in New York

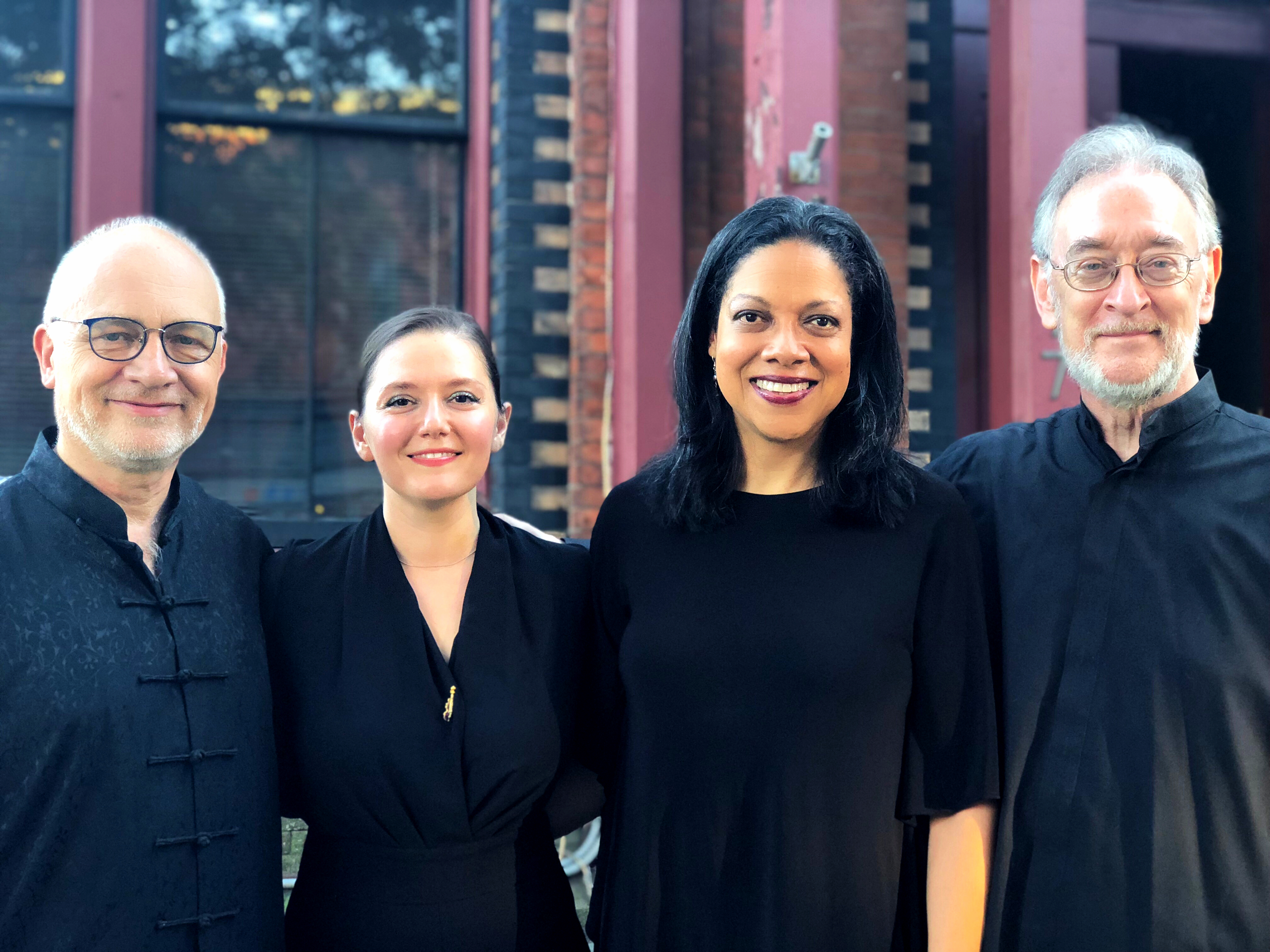
- The Juilliard String Quartet in 2018

Background information
- Also known as: The Juilliard Quartet
- Origin: New York City, United States
- Genres: Classical
- Occupation: String quartet
- Instruments: 2 violins, 1 viola, 1 cello
- Years active: 1946–present
- Labels: Sony Classical (formerly Columbia Records and CBS Masterworks)
- Members: Areta Zhulla; Leonard Fu; Molly Carr; Astrid Schween
- Past members: see below
- Website: juilliardstringquartet.org

The Juilliard String Quartet (JSQ) is a classical music string quartet founded in 1946 at the Juilliard School in New York by William Schuman and Robert Mann. Since its inception, it has been the quartet-in-residence at the Juilliard School. It has received numerous awards, including four Grammys and membership in the National Academy of Recording Arts and Sciences Hall of Fame. In February 2011, the group received the NARAS Lifetime Achievement Award for its outstanding contributions to recorded classical music.

As of 2025, the quartet's members are violinists Areta Zhulla and Leonard Fu, violist Molly Carr, and cellist Astrid Schween.

== History ==
=== First era: 1946–1996 ===
The quartet was founded by Juilliard School president William Schuman and violin faculty member Robert Mann in 1946. The original members were Mann and violinist Robert Koff, violist Raphael Hillyer and cellist Arthur Winograd. It began recording with Columbia Records upon its founding. Between March and August 1949, the quartet became the first group to record Béla Bartók's complete string quartets. Columbia released the recordings in 1950. Around the time of its public and recording debuts, the Juilliard Quartet quickly established itself as a premier American ensemble on the international level.

In 1953, the group was the first to record Arnold Schoenberg's complete quartets. In 1955, Claus Adam replaced Winograd as the group's cellist. In 1958, Isidore Cohen replaced Koff as second violinist.

In 1962, the Juilliard String Quartet replaced the Budapest String Quartet as the Library of Congress's quartet in residence. That year, the quartet performed at the Library with a set of Stradivarius instruments Gertrude Clarke Whittall donated in the 1930s. In 1966, Earl Carlyss replaced Cohen as second violinist and three years later, Samuel Rhodes replaced Hillyer as violist.

In 1974, Joel Krosnick replaced his teacher Adam as the cellist. By 1981, the Juilliard Quartet was said to have performed in over 3,000 concerts in 43 different countries. In 1986, Joel Smirnoff replaced Carlyss as second violinist.

In 1996, Mann announced his intention to retire. He played his last concert as a member of the quartet at the Tanglewood Music Festival that year. Smirnoff took over as first violinist and Ronald Copes joined the group as second violinist.

=== 21st century: 1997–present ===
In 2005, the quartet performed in Madrid for Queen Sofía of Spain on the set of Stradivarius Palatinos instruments owned by the Royal Palace of Madrid. In 2009, Nick Eanet replaced Smirnoff as first violinist. He left the group in 2010 for health reasons and was replaced by Joseph Lin of the Formosa Quartet.

In 2013, Roger Tapping replaced Rhodes as violist. In 2015, the quartet released an app for Apple's iOS called "Juilliard String Quartet – An Exploration of Schubert's Death and the Maiden". Ulysses Arts issued the recording separately. The London-based app developer Touchpress and the Juilliard School co-produced the app, which features the quartet in a performance of Franz Schubert's String Quartet No. 14 in D minor ("Death and the Maiden"). In 2016, Astrid Schween replaced Krosnick as cellist, becoming the quartet's first female member. Areta Zhulla then replaced Lin as first violinist. After Tapping's death in 2022, Molly Carr became the quartet's new violist.

== Repertoire ==
The quartet plays a wide range of classical music, and has recorded works by Beethoven, Mendelssohn, Bartók, Debussy and Shostakovich, among others, while also promoting more contemporary composers such as Elliott Carter, Ralph Shapey, Henri Dutilleux and Milton Babbitt. It has performed with other noted musicians, such as Aaron Copland, Glenn Gould, Benita Valente and also (in its early days) the scientist Albert Einstein. It can be heard on the soundtrack of the movie Immortal Beloved. By the early 1990s, the quartet was said to have produced more than 100 recordings and performed over 500 unique works.

== Members ==
=== First violin ===
- 1946 Robert Mann
- 1997 Joel Smirnoff
- 2009 Nick Eanet
- 2011 Joseph Lin
- 2018 Areta Zhulla

=== Second violin ===
- 1946 Robert Koff
- 1958 Isidore Cohen
- 1966 Earl Carlyss
- 1986 Joel Smirnoff
- 1997 Ronald Copes
- 2025 Leonard Fu

=== Viola ===
- 1946 Raphael Hillyer
- 1969 Samuel Rhodes
- 2013 Roger Tapping
- 2022 Molly Carr

=== Violoncello ===
- 1946 Arthur Winograd
- 1955 Claus Adam
- 1974 Joel Krosnick
- 2016 Astrid Schween

== Teaching ==
Members of the Juilliard Quartet are also private teachers and chamber coaches at the Juilliard School and at music festivals worldwide. Musicians who have studied with the quartet have gone on to become members of the Tokyo, Emerson, Shanghai, LaSalle, Concord, Alexander, New World, Brentano, Lark, and the Ulysses string quartets among others.

== Awards ==
=== Grammy Awards ===
Year	Recipient	Award	Result	Ref
1961	Debussy and Ravel Quartets	Grammy Award for Best Classical Performance - Vocal or Instrumental - Chamber Music	Nominated	
1962	Berg: Lyric Suite; Webern: 5 Pieces for String Quartet, Op. 5; 6 Bagatelles, Op. 6	Grammy Award for Best Chamber Music Performance	Nominated	
1964	Beethoven: Quartet in F Minor, Op. 95; String Quartet in F Major, Op. 135	Grammy Award for Best Classical Performance - Chamber Music	Nominated	
1965	Beethoven: Quartet in A Minor, Op. 132	Grammy Award for Best Chamber Music Performance - Instrumental	Nominated	
1966	Bartók: The Six String Quartets	Grammy Award for Best Chamber Music Performance - Instrumental or Vocal	Won	
1968	Ives: Quartets Nos. 1 and 3	Grammy Award for Best Chamber Music Performance	Nominated	
1972	Debussy: Quartet in G Minor/Ravel: Quartet in F	Grammy Award for Best Chamber Music Performance	Won	
1975	Beethoven: The Late Quartets	Grammy Award for Best Chamber Music Performance	Nominated	
1978	Schoenberg: Quartets for Strings (Complete)	Grammy Award for Best Chamber Music Performance	Won	
1980	Webern: The Complete Works of Anton Webern, Vol. 1	Grammy Award for Best Classical Album	Nominated	
1981	Schubert: Quartet No. 15 in G Major, Op. 161	Grammy Award for Best Chamber Music Performance	Nominated	
1984	Bartók: The String Quartets (6)	Grammy Award for Best Chamber Music Performance	Nominated	
1985	Beethoven: The Late String Quartets	Grammy Award for Best Chamber Music Performance	Won	
1986	Chausson: Concerto for Violin, Piano and String Quartet, Op. 21	Grammy Award for Best Chamber Music Performance	Nominated	
1991	Haydn: The Seven Last Words of Christ	Grammy Award for Best Chamber Music or Other Small Ensemble Performance	Nominated	
1992	Carter: The Four String Quartets; Duo for Violin and Piano	Grammy Award for Best Chamber Music Performance	Nominated	
1992	Carter: The Four String Quartets; Duo for Violin and Piano	Grammy Award for Best Classical Album	Nominated	
1995	Debussy/Ravel/Dutilleux: Quartets	Grammy Award for Best Chamber Music Performance	Nominated	
2011	—	Grammy Lifetime Achievement Award	Won	
