= Great Pustaha =

Magical book displayed in Amsterdam

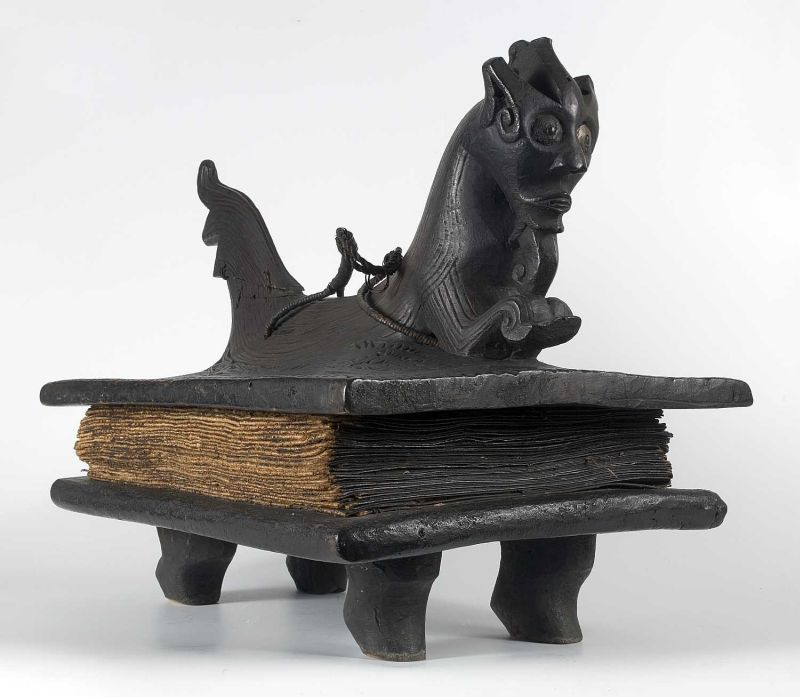
The Great Pustaha, the oldest pustaha still in existence and probably the largest pustaha ever built.

The Great Pustaha (Dutch: de Grote Pustaha) is a pustaha (Batak magic book) displayed in the Tropenmuseum of Amsterdam. The name refers to the largest pustaha which was kept in the museum. The official name for the pustaha is simply "pustaha", but for the purpose of distinction, the pustaha is called the Great Pustaha.

The Great Pustaha is among the 150 pustahas kept in the Tropenmuseum. Written by nine generations of datu, the pustaha is among the oldest pustaha in the world. It is also the largest pustaha in the world, reaching the height of 42 centimeters if seated. The Great Pustaha has been on display at the museum almost permanently from the very beginning. In 1923, before Tropenmuseum was officially opened, visitors could come and see the Anniversary Exhibition for Queen Wilhelmina's 25 years of reign in 1923. While most of the museum was still under construction, objects were displayed on tables in the museum galleries, including the Great Pustaha.

== Form ==
If closed, the pustaha takes the form of a beast standing on its four hooves. The top panel is surmounted with a carved representation of the serpent-like animal with the head of a singa. At the bottom panel is four legs or hooves. Achim Sibeth, author of The Batak, commented that the animal is the representation of the Naga Padoha, a primordial water serpent that rules the underworld. A Batak creation myth told that in primordial times when the world was all ocean, the serpent stirred up sand from the ocean bed to create the first islands which create the islands of Indonesia. Other expert thinks that the figure represents the singa. The word singa, borrowed from Sanskrit सिंह (siṃha) meaning "lion", dates back to the time of the first contact with Hindu traders in the southern Batak area. In Batak culture, however, the singa is a complicated mythical creature related to the female serpent. An example of the representation of singa can be found in a wooden animal head collected by Tassilo Adam, a German planter and an enthusiast in Batak Toba culture.

Between the cover-panels are pages of the pustaha, folded like the book music used in a mechanical street organ. The 56 pages are made of the bark of the agarwood (Aquilaria malaccensis). The bark page reaches 17 meters in length if unfolded. The ink is made of a mixture of boiled tree resin and other ingredients. Bamboo skewers, buffalo horn or the grain of a sugar palm leaf is used for the writing. The Great Pustaha contains descriptions of all kinds of spells and incantations needed by the datu. Examples of formula in the pustaha are a formula to destroy other villages; formula to eliminate opponents; to inspire love; stories about the creation of the world.

A rattan cord is attached to the front legs and through a hole in the abdomen. This cord is used to carry the pustaha like a bag.

The Great Pustaha is always displayed unopened in the museum, which emphasizes its animal-like physical aspect.

== History ==
The Great Pustaha was collected in the 1850s, but its true age is perhaps older. The content was translated into Dutch by Father H.J.A. Promes in 1968. The Great Pustaha contains the names of the priests and the villages where they lived. By studying the name of the villages, it can be assumed that the knowledge was transferred from the west of Lake Toba to the southwest of the lake, all the way to Lobu Siregar villages in Siborong-Borong. The datu who wrote and owned the Great Pustaha, Guru Tumurun Hata ni adji, namora Simandjuntak lived in this village.

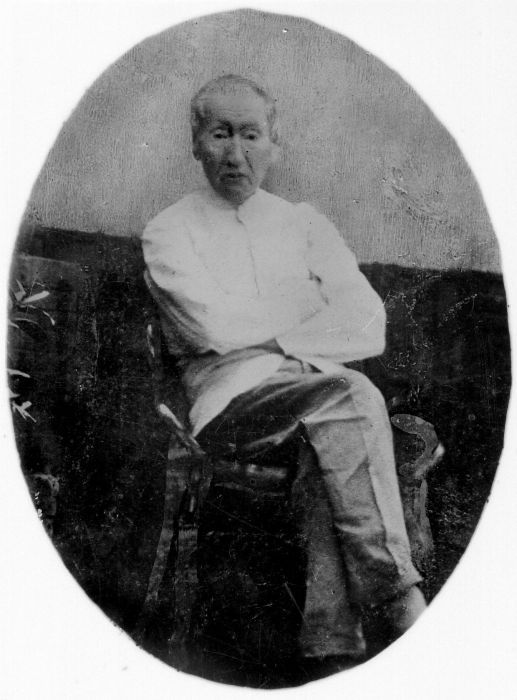
The linguist Herman Neubronner van der Tuuk brought the Great Pustaha to the Netherlands.

The pustaha was brought to the Netherlands by a linguist Herman Neubronner van der Tuuk. Van der Tuuk was born in Malacca (1824). At the age of 12, he was sent to the Netherlands for his education. As a linguist, he went to Sumatra on an assignment for the Netherlands Bible Society to translate the Bible into the Batak language. In 1851 he arrived in North Sumatra. In 1852, he moved to North Sumatran port town of Barus on the west coast of Sumatra. From there he traveled to the interior of Batak land where he discovered the Batak language in its purest form. Van der Tuuk is probably the first European to see the Lake Toba. Van der Tuuk collected various Batak crafts during his stay between 1851 and 1857, including the Great Pustaha.

In 1857, Van der Tuuk was forced to return to Barus after nearly being killed by the Sisingamangaraja, the holy priest-king of the Toba Batak people. He went back to the Netherlands in 1857 and never returned to Sumatra. In the Netherlands, Van der Tuuk finished his four-volume of Batak-Nederduitsch dictionary and translated a number of Books of the Bible. Van der Tuuk missed the East Indies and so he returned to other islands of the Netherlands East Indies. He finally resided in Bali as a Balinese residence. In 1894, Van der Tuuk died of dysentery at the age of 70 in a military hospital in Surabaya, East Java.

In 1862, before going to Bali, van der Tuuk donated his collection to the Ethnographic Museum of the Zoological Society of Natura Artis Magistra (now the Artis Zoo, Amsterdam). At that time it was common for a zoo to display ethnographical collections. Artifacts were usually acquired from private collectors, administrators, trade agents, travelers, explorers, missionaries, companies, and scientific societies. There was no specific area of interest, all continents were represented in a bunch of unclassified ethnographic item.

=== Natura Artis Magistra and the Colonial Museum ===
In 1861, a separate Ethnographical Museum was established in the zoo. The room was small, so objects were stacked on top of each other. A 19th-century drawing shows the Great Pustaha placed on the floor, while other Toba Batak crafts e.g. potion holders, staffs, and knives, hung from above.

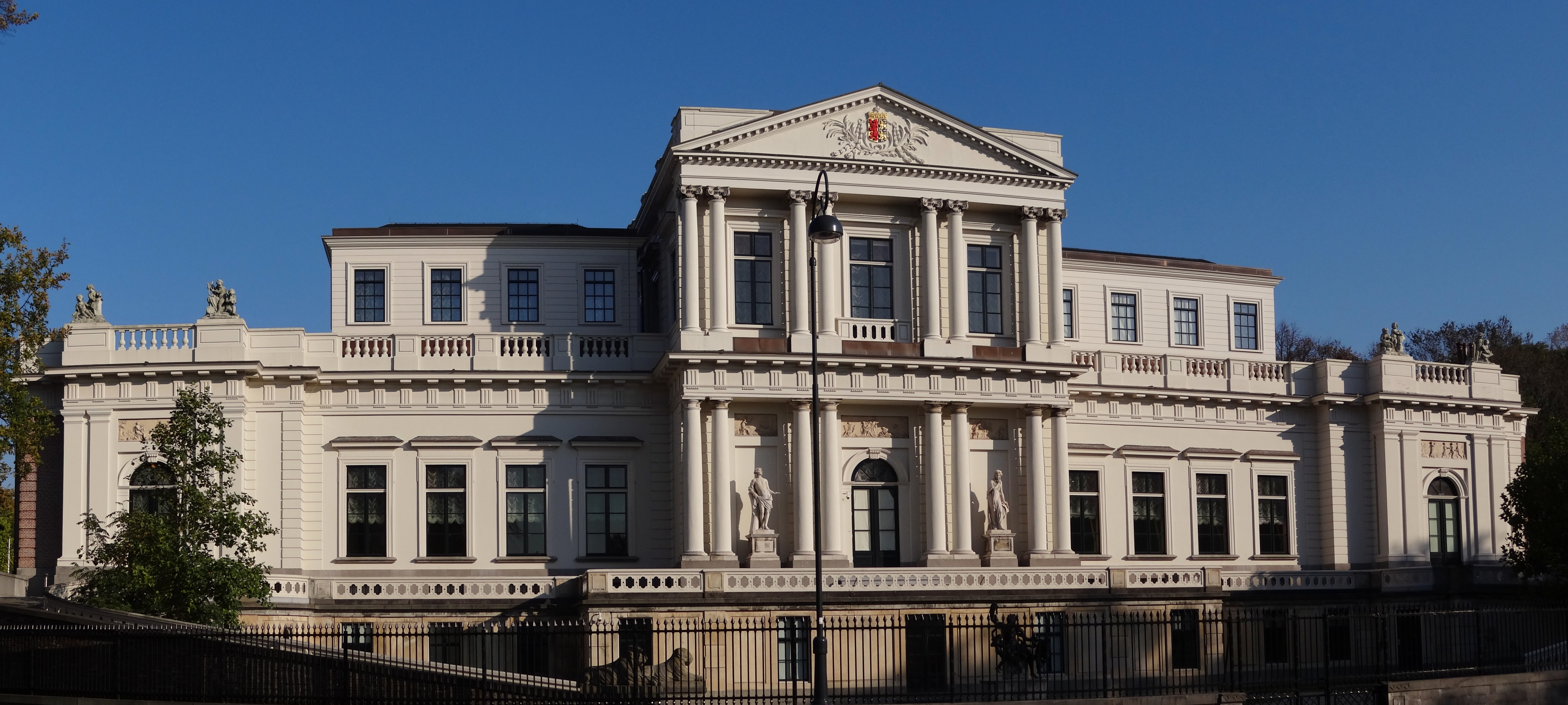
Pavilion Welgelegen in Haarlem, among the many ethnological museums rising during the late 19th-century.

In 1871, the Colonial Museum opened its doors. Frederik van Eeden collected samples of trade goods from the colonial territories e.g. the Netherlands East and West Indies. The Pavilion Welgelegen, where the ethnological collection was kept, soon became too small for the increasingly vast collection.

In 1910 the Vereeniging Koloniaal Instituut was founded and plans were made to build a new facility in Amsterdam, opposite to Natura Artis Magistra. One of the plans is to establish a central museum for all ethnographical collections. Construction of the museum took longer than expected, partly due to World War I. When it was finished in 1926, the Colonial Institute at the Mauritskade was the largest building in Amsterdam.

In 1921, Artis donated the entire ethnographical collection of over 10,000 objects to the Colonial Institute. Through this transaction, the objects donated by Van der Tuuk came together with the collection of the Colonial Museum, including the Great Pustaha.

=== World War ===
In 1939, when the threat of war was felt from neighboring Germany, the Great Pustaha was evacuated from the galleries and kept in the museum's basements. According to a newspaper article, the pustaha was one of the most precious objects stored in the vault. The Great Pustaha survived the war, perhaps thanks to the fact that the 'Ordnungspolizei' was based inside the Colonial Institute's office.

After the war, the Great Pustaha was back on display. At this time the museum was called the Indisch Museum. The name Indisch Museum remained until December 1949, when the independence of Indonesia was recognized by the Netherlands.

=== Tropenmuseum ===
After 1949, the museum received its present name.

In 1987 the exhibition “Budaya Indonesia: arts and crafts of Indonesia” was opened to the public. This exhibition gave an overview of 2000 years of culture and history of Indonesia, represented by 500 artifacts. The pustaha was once more displayed within the context of magical, sorcery-related objects like the medicine horns and containers.

Today, the pustaha is displayed on its own as the most important example of the dragon, and as a representation of Naga Padoha.

== Cited works ==
- Sinclair, Susan (2012). Bibliography of Art and Architecture in the Islamic World (2 Vol. Set). BRILL. ISBN 9789004170582.
- Tropenmuseum (2012). Stories Around the World - Teacher's Pack (8-12 years olds) (PDF). Amsterdam: Koninklijk Instituut voor de Tropen. Archived from the original (PDF) on 2017-11-07.
- Westerkamp, Willem (2009). "FROM SINGA TO NAGA PADOHA, THE MAKING OF A MAGICAL CREATURE". Indonesia and the Malay World. 37 (108). doi:10.1080/13639810902979354.
