= Fantasy for Orchestra =

Composition by Robert Mann

Fantasy for Orchestra is an orchestral composition by the American violinist and composer Robert Mann. The work was commissioned by the New York Philharmonic and was completed in 1957. It was first performed by the New York Philharmonic under the direction of Dimitri Mitropoulos at Carnegie Hall on February 23, 1957. The music is cast in a single movement and has a duration of approximately 13 minutes in performance. It is one of Mann's best known compositions.
