= Awilda Villarini =

Puerto Rican composer and pianist (born 1940)

Awilda M. Villarini-Garcia (born 6 February 1940) is a Puerto Rican composer and pianist who publishes and performs under the name "Awilda Villarini."

Villarini was born in Patillas. Her first piano teacher was her mother, who was a church organist. She went on to earn a B. Mus. (1961) from Peabody Conservatory and a M. Mus. (1973) from the Juilliard School. Grants from the Institute of Puerto Rican Culture enabled Villarini to study piano in Paris and Vienna. She received a Ford Foundation scholarship for a Ph.D. from New York University in 1979. Her dissertation was entitled A Study of Selected Puerto Rican Danzas for the Piano. Villarini's teachers included Claus Adam, Jean Marie Darre, Carmelina Figureoa, Alexander Gorodnitzky, William Kroll, Eugene List, Walter Panhofer, and Dieter Weber.

Villarini received a grant from the National Endowment for the Arts in 1981. She was the 1985 winner of the Artist International Piano Award. The late New York Times music critic Harold C. Schonberg wrote: "I have heard Liszt's Transcendental Etude in f minor by hundreds of young pianists in different piano competitions. Ms. Villarini's technique and interpretation proved to be superior to all of them. She is an exciting romantic pianist."

Villarini's compositions include:

== Chamber ==
- Three Fantastic Pieces (clarinet and piano)
- Variaciones sobre el Canto del Coquí (unaccompanied flute)
- Visiones (woodwind quintet)

== Orchestra ==
- Cinquillo Dramatico
- Concerto (orchestra and piano)
- Legend of the Indian
- Suite Portoricinses (also a piano reduction)

== Piano ==
- Sonata No. 1
- Suite Portoricinses (also orchestrated)
- Ten Preludes
- Three Preludes for Piano

== Vocal ==
- "Dialogue" (text by Pat Parker)
- Four Songs
- Two Love Songs (texts by Julia de Burgos and Pablo Neruda)
