= Cassatt Quartet =

American string quartet

- Also known as: Cassatt String Quartet
- Origin: New York City
- Genres: Contemporary classical
- Years active: 1985–present
- Labels: PolyGram; Centaur; Albany; New World; Tzadik; Cantaloupe; Naxos; Innova; Toccata Classics; Navona
- Members: Muneko Otani; Jennifer Leshnower
- Past members: Emily Brandenburg; Gwen Krosnick; Laura Goldberg; Sarah Adams; Anna Cholakian; Michiko Oshima; Sunghae Anna Lim; Tawnya Popoff; Caroline Stinson; Ah Ling Neu; Elizabeth Anderson
- Website: cassattquartet.com

The Cassatt String Quartet was founded in 1985. Originally the first participants in Juilliard's Young Artists Quartet Program, the Quartet has gone on to win many teaching fellowships and awards and has toured internationally. Named after impressionist painter Mary Cassatt, the quartet is based in New York City.

The Cassatt Quartet has performed at New York's Alice Tully Hall and Weill Recital Hall at Carnegie Hall, the Tanglewood Music Theater, the Kennedy Center and Library of Congress in Washington, DC. Internationally, it has taken the stage at the Théâtre des Champs-Élysées in Paris, Maeda Hall in Tokyo, the American Academy in Rome, the Palacio de Bellas Artes in Mexico City and the Festival de Música de Cámera in San Miguel de Allende. Composers whose works the quartet has performed include Tina Davidson, Jay Reise, Andy Tierstien, Joan Tower, and Dan Welcher. The acclaimed quartet has built a reputation for being a champion of work by living composers.

Named three times in The New Yorker magazine's Best Of The Year CD Selection, they have recorded for the Koch, Naxos, New World, Albany and CRI Labels.

== History ==
The Cassatt Quartet was founded in 1985 by four young artists at Juilliard who were inspired by the work of artist Mary Cassatt. It won the Coleman Chamber Music Competition one year later, and two top prizes in the Banff International String Quartet Competition in 1989. At that time the quartet consisted of Laura Goldberg and Muneko Otani, violins; Sarah Adams, viola; and Anna Cholakian, cello. Founding members included cellist Anna Cholakian and violinist Laura J. Goldberg. Goldberg went on to join the Juilliard pre-college teaching faculty and later left the quartet. She later founded Arts Ahimsa, a group that uses music and the arts to promote non-violence.

In 1991 the quartet, composed of Muneko Otani, Laura Goldberg (violin); Michiko Oshima (viola); Anna Cholakian (cello) performed for the soundtrack of the TV Show Fishing with John. That work appears in a CD produced in 1998.

As of 1993, the members of the quartet were Anna Cholakian, cello, Muneko Otani and Sunghae Anna Lim, violins, and Michiko Oshima, viola.

Cholakian was lost to cancer in February 1996. Composer Andrew Waggoner dedicated his Symphony No. 2 to Anna Cholakian's memory, indicating that the third movement echoed, among other things "an old Armenian song beloved of Anna and her father, “Hokis Murmur (My Soul is Sad).” Composer David Lang also wrote a piece in memory of Cholakian, 'Cello', as part of his piano works series, "memory pieces."

Members of the Cassatt Quartet have served in residency at the University of Pennsylvania in Philadelphia, and created the Louis Krasner Graduate String Quartet Program for training young, professionally oriented string quartets at the Setnor School of Music of Syracuse University while in extended residency there. Quartet members as of 2001 were Muneko Otani and Jennifer Leshnower, violins; Tawnya Popoff, viola; and Caroline Stinson, cello.

=== Current members ===
- Muneko Otani, violin, serves on the faculty of Columbia University and the Mannes College of Music in New York City, and the Mozarteum Summer Festival in Salzburg. Otani plays a 1770 J.B. Guadagnini of Parma violin.
- Jennifer Leshnower, violin, coaches chamber music worldwide, including masterclasses in Ireland at Trinity College, Dublin and the Royal Irish Academy of Music. Leshnower's violin is a 1655 Jacobus Stainer.

=== Past members ===
- Ah Ling Neu, violist, has performed chamber music as a former member of the Ridge Quartet and the New York Philomusica, and her summer festival appearances include the Marlboro Music Festival, Tanglewood and White Mountains Music Festivals. She presently teaches at Columbia University and Williams College.
- Elizabeth Anderson was formerly cellist of the Naumburg Award-winning Meliora Quartet and is Assistant Principal Cellist with the New York City Opera Orchestra. As recitalist she has toured throughout the United States, Europe and Asia.
- Emily Brandenburg, viola, serves on the faculty of Riverdale Country School and has performed with ensembles including the St. Paul Chamber Orchestra, the Albany and Portland Symphonies, plus chamber music groups such as the Metropolis Ensemble and the Frisson Chamber Ensemble.[7]
- Gwen Krosnick, cello, was the founding cellist of Trio Cleonice, with whom she performed from 2008 to 2016 internationally. She has premiered pieces by composers including, but not limited to, Lei Liang, Richard Wernick, Elliott Carter, Charles Wuorinen, Roger Sessions, Donald Martino, Dorothy Rudd Moore, and Sofia Gubaidulina.[8]

== Discography ==
- Cassatt: The Cassatt String Quartet, Composers Recordings, Jun 8, 1994
- Julia Wolfe: Arsenal for Democracy, Polygram Records, Jun 4, 1996
- Francis White: The Composer in the Computer Age IV, Centaur, Jan 21, 1997
- Nothing Devine is Mundane: Songs of Virgil Thompson, Albany Records, Dec 16, 1997
- Mary Jane Leach: Adriane's Lament, New World Records, Feb 24, 1998
- Gisburg: Trust, Tzadik, Oct 20, 1998
- The Music of Ursula Mamlok, Composers Recordings, Apr 13, 1999
- Margaret Brouwer: Crosswinds, New World Records, Nov 1, 2001
- Andrew Waggoner: Legacy, New World Records, Nov 1, 2001
- The Music of Ezra Laderman, Vol. 3, Albany Records, Jan 29, 2002
- Chamber Music by Lawrence Dillon, Albany Records, Jul 30, 2002
- Julia Wolfe: The String Quartets, Cantaloupe, Feb 11, 2003
- Daniel S. Godfrey: String Quartets, KOCH International Classics, Apr 27, 2004
- Steven Stucky: In Shadow, In Light, Albany Records, May 25, 2004
- Sebastian Currier: Quartetset, Quiet Time, New World Records, Feb 7, 2006
- Tina Davidson: It Is My Heart Singing, Albany Records, Jun 1, 2006
- Jay Reise: Chamber Music, Albany Records, Mar 4, 2008
- Music of Ezra Laderman, Vol. 8, Albany Records, Dec 1, 2008
- Andy Teirstein "Open Crossings" Naxos Records
- Dan Welcher "String Quartets Nos. 1-3" Naxos Records
- Ravel and Dvorak "String Quartet and Quartet Op. 105 in A-Flat Major", 2008
- Music of Ezra Landerman: Quartets 6, 7, & 8, Albany Records, 2010
- The Eleanor Hovda Collection, Innova, 2012
- Laura Kaminsky "Cadmium Yellow", Albany Records, 2013
- Samuel Adler, String Quartet No. 10, Toccata Classics, 2021
- Andy Teirstein "Restless Nation," Navona Records, 2022
- Victoria Bond "Blue and Green Music," Albany Records, 2022
- Gerald Cohen "Voyagers," Innova, 2023

== Recognition and awards ==
- First Prize at the Coleman Chamber Music Competition in 1986.
- First Prize at the Fischoff Chamber Music Competition
- 2nd Place at the Banff International String Quartet Competition, plus 'Best performance of the piéce de concert (Allan Bell, Arche II)', 1989
- The 1995 CMA/ASCAP First Prize Award for Adventurous Programming
- A 1996 recording grant from the Mary Flagler Cary Charitable Trust
- Julia Wolfe: The String Quartets listed in The New Yorker's Year's Best CDs of 2003
- Daniel S. Godfrey: String Quartets listed in The New Yorker's Year's Best CDs of 2004
- Sebastian Currier, Quartetset/Quiet Time listed in The New Yorker's Year's Best CDs of 2006
