= Astrid Schween =

American cellist

- Origin: New York City, United States
- Genres: Classical
- Occupation: Cellist
- Instrument: cello
- Years active: 1970–present
- Website: www.astridschween.com

Astrid Schween is a cellist with the Juilliard String Quartet, having joined in 2016.

== Early life and education ==
Schween first heard a cello while listening to a concert at Tanglewood, she was three years old at the time. Schween began performing professionally in 1970 with the New York Philharmonic at the age of 16. Schween studied cello at Juilliard, closely under mentor Jacqueline du Pré, as well as Leonard Rose, Harvey Shapiro and Bernard Greenhouse; earning her bachelor's (1980) and master's degrees (1985).

== Career ==
While at Juillard, Schween was a member of the all-women's Lark Quartet, as well as a member of the Boston Trio. She joined the faculty at the University of Massachusetts Amherst in 2004. In 2016, Schween became the first female to join the Juilliard String Quartet, having replaced long-time cellist Joel Krosnick.

== Discography ==
JSQ albums

- 2018: Beethoven – Davidovsky – Bartók: String Quartets
- 2021: Beethoven – Bartók – Dvořák: String Quartets

== Honors and awards ==
As a group, the Lark Quartet won multiple awards in 1990, including the Karl Klingler International String Quartet Competition and the Namberg Chamber Music Award.
