= Claus Adam =

American cellist, teacher and composer

Background information
- Born: November 5, 1917
- Died: July 4, 1983 (aged 65)
- Occupations: Cellist, Composer
- Instrument: Cello

Claus Adam (November 5, 1917 – July 4, 1983) was an American cellist and cello teacher as well as a composer. His music teachers include Emanuel Feuermann for cello, Stefan Wolpe for composition, and Léon Barzin for conducting. He served as the second cellist of the Juilliard String Quartet from 1955 to 1974, preceded by Arthur Winograd and succeeded by Joel Krosnick, a former student of his. Composer and pianist Awilda Villarini was also one of his students.

He devoted the last decade of his life primarily to musical composition, and several of his works—including a cello concerto and a string trio—are published by G. Schirmer.

Adam lived in Indonesia until he was six. His father, Tassilo Adam, was an ethnologist there. He then went to Europe and studied in Salzburg. In 1929 he went to the USA.
