= Anna Weesner =

American composer (born 1965)

- Born: 1965 (age 60–61); Iowa City, Iowa, U.S.
- Education: Yale University; Cornell University
- Occupation: Composer
- Employer: University of Pennsylvania
- Awards: Guggenheim Fellowship (2009)
- Musical career
- Genres: Classical music
- Instrument: Flute

Anna Weesner (born 1965) is an American classical composer. Originally a flute student, educator, and performer, she later shifted towards composing in the 1990s. A 2009 Guggenheim Fellow, she has released two albums – Small and Mighty Forces (2014) and My Mother in Love (2024) – and she is Dr. Robert Weiss Professor of Music at the University of Pennsylvania.

== Early life and career ==
Anna Weesner was born in 1965 in Iowa City, Iowa. Her parents were both artists, her mother a high school music teacher specializing in piano and her father a novelist who studied at the Iowa Writers' Workshop at the time of her birth. She was later raised in Durham, New Hampshire, where her father worked at the University of New Hampshire at the time.

Originally interested in the violin as a child, Weesner switched to flute as a teenager, and was performing the instrument at public venues by 1987. After studying composition and piano with Martin Amlin at Phillips Exeter Academy, she obtained her BA in Music (1987) at Yale University, where she studied under Jonathan Berger, Michael Friedman, and Thomas Nyfenger, and her MFA (1993) and DMA (1995) at Cornell University, where she studied under Karel Husa, Roberto Sierra, and Steven Stucky.

== Composition career ==
Weesner participated in the 1995 Young Americans' Art Song Competition, where she was one of the winners with a composition for the Emily Dickinson poem "Alter! When the Hills do". She was a MacDowell Colony Fellow in 1995, 1998, and 2001. Bernard Holland of The New York Times said that in a 1996 performance in Voices of the Spirit at the 92nd Street Y, she "offer[ed] a spiritual vision that prefers hard truths to warm reassurance." In 2000, Peter Dobrin of The Philadelphia Inquirer said that the instrumental ranges of her piece "Sudden, Unbidden" "mak[e] for an unattractive, expressive skittishness"; the next year, he praised her for "knowing the value of repetition" and being "especially communicative" in the first song of her composition series Early, After, Ever, Now.

Weesner's 2002 piece "Still Things Move", commissioned for the Metamorphosen Chamber Orchestra, was commended by Ellen Pfeifer of The Boston Globe as "a very attractive essay in three interconnected movements", and Allan Kozinn of The New York Times said that it "thrived on the ground between the Wuorinen and the Hovhaness" and "in its best moments it was animated and full of surprising turns." She was a 2003 Pew Fellow in Music, and was the recipient of a 2008 American Academy of Arts and Letters Academy Award and a 2009 Guggenheim Fellowship.

Weesner's album Small and Mighty Forces was released from Albany Records in 2014; David W. Moore praised it for its sound and instrumental composition. The same year, her 2006 piece "Mother Tongues" was performed at the Tanglewood Music Festival; Matthew Guerrieri of The Boston Globe said that it "circled its short, often pop-pentatonic motives, judged the arrangement from a distance, went back in and shifted things around." In 2018, she won the Virgil Thomson Award in Vocal Music. She was a 2020 winner of an Independence Foundation Fellow in Performing Arts. In 2023, she was awarded a Fromm Foundation Commission. In 2024, she released another album, My Mother in Love, from Bridge Records.

According to David W. Moore, Weesner's "music is enjoyable, as you may judge by the zany titles".

== Education career ==
Weesner originally taught flute privately during her undergraduate studies, and she was a teaching assistant at Cornell while a graduate student there. In 1997, she became an assistant professor of music at the University of Pennsylvania, before becoming promoted to associate professor in 2004 and full professor in 2012.

Weesner was appointed undergraduate chair of Penn's Department of Music in 2006, before becoming full chair afterwards. In 2019, she was the Maurice Abravanel Distinguished Visiting Composer at the University of Utah. In 2022, Weesner was appointed Dr. Robert Weiss Professor of Music at Penn.

== Discography ==
Title	Year	Details	Ref.
Small and Mighty Forces	2014	Released: October 1, 2014; Label: Albany Records	
My Mother in Love	2024	Released: 2024; Label: Bridge Records	

=== Other compositions ===
Title	Year	Album	Ref.
"Alter? When the Hills Do" (lyrics by Emily Dickinson)	1996	Non-album	
"Falling In" (by Orchestra 2001)	2002	Music of Our Time: Volume 5	
"Distant Heart" (by Mary Nessinger and Jeanne Golan)	2009	Innocence Lost: The Berg-Debussy Project	
"Vamp" (by Prism Quartet)	2009	Animal, Vegetable, Mineral	
"Possible Stories" (by Caroline Stinson)	2011	Lines	
"Flexible Parts" (by Melia Watras)	2012	Short Stories	
"The Eight Lost Songs of Orlando Underground" (by Romie de Guise-Langlois)	2019	Lark Quartet: A Farewell Celebration	
