= Ulysses Quartet =

Professional string quartet based in New York City

Ulysses String Quartet
- Origin: New York, New York, United States
- Genres: Contemporary, classical
- Occupation: Chamber ensemble
- Years active: 2015-present
- Members: Christina Bouey, violin Rhiannon Banerdt, violin Julian Seney, viola Grace Ho, cello
- Past members: Peter Dudek, viola; Colin Brookes, viola
- Website: www.ulyssesquartet.com

The Ulysses Quartet (est. in 2015) is a professional string quartet based in New York City. The group's name pays homage to Homer's hero Odysseus and his 10-year voyage home, as well as to former U.S. President Ulysses S. Grant, near whose resting place in Upper Manhattan several of the group's members reside. On April 2, 2024, it was announced that founding violist Colin Brookes left the quartet, and that Peter Dudek joined to replace him. On May 14, 2026 it was announced that Julian Seney had replaced Peter Dudek as a member.

== Concerts ==
The quartet has performed in such venues as Alice Tully Hall, Jordan Hall, and the Taiwan National Recital Hall. Performance highlights have included appearances at the Chamber Music Society of Lincoln Center, the Harbin Grand Theatre, Premiere Performances of Hong Kong, and Naumburg Orchestral Concerts. Other engagements have included the Buffalo Chamber Music Society; Cecilia Concerts (Halifax); South Orange Performing Arts Center (New Jersey); Sprague Hall at Yale University; Mostly Music (New Jersey); Rhode Island Chamber Music Concerts; Chamber Music Society of Bethlehem (Pennsylvania); National Arts Centre (Ottawa); Bargemusic; Eastman School of Music; and Vietnam Connection Music Festival.

The quartet also works to bring music to where people are, performing at non-traditional venues such as cafes, libraries, living rooms, and other community gathering places. Their aim is to bring music particularly to young people who may not have had exposure to formal concert settings.

== Awards and recognition ==
The Ulysses Quartet won the grand prize and gold medal in the senior string division of the 2016 Fischoff National Chamber Music Competition and first prize in the 2018 Schoenfeld International String Competition. In 2017, the quartet finished first in the American Prize and won second prize at the Osaka International Chamber Music Competition. They were winners of the Vietnam International Music Competition in 2019. From 2017 to 2019, Ulysses was in residence at the Louis Moreau Institute in New Orleans, working with composer Morris Rosenzweig. From 2019–2022, the Ulysses Quartet were the Lisa Arnhold Fellows of the Juilliard School. From 2024–2026, Ulysses Quartet was the first ever quartet in residence at GBH Music, a partnership made possible by a generous contribution from the Mattina R. Proctor Foundation.

== Recordings ==
The Ulysses Quartet released their debut album, Shades of Romani Folklore, on Navona Records in 2023 to critical acclaim from outlets such as Gramophone. Other available recordings include A Giant Beside You on New Focus Records, in collaboration with guitarist Ben Verdery, and the Sea Change Quartets of composer Joseph Summer on Albany Records. The ensemble has recorded the complete works for string quartet of Felix and Fanny Mendelssohn for anticipated release in 2026.
