= Andrew Waggoner =

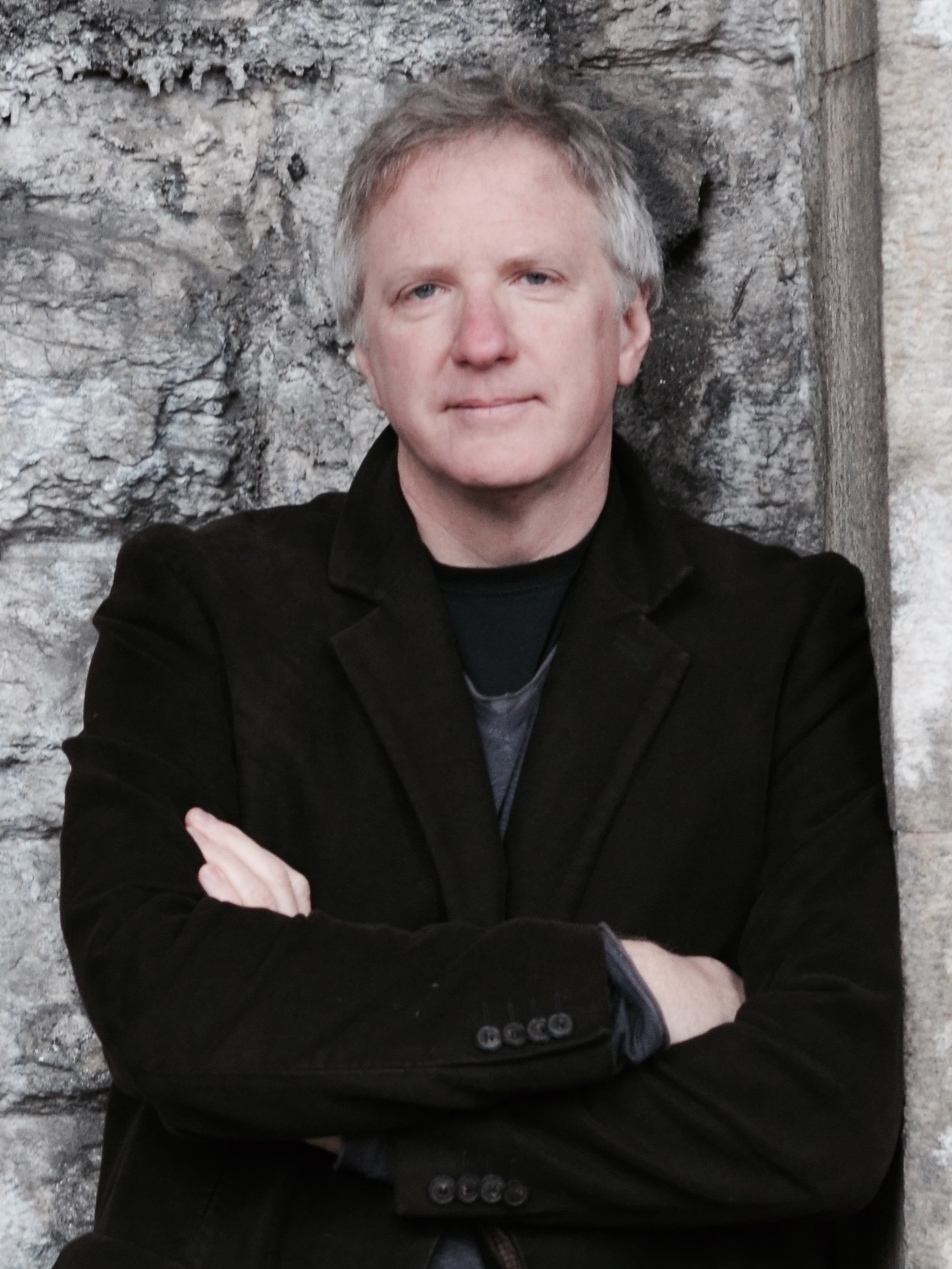
- Waggoner in Inwood, New York, in November 2015

Background information
- Born: 10 November 1960 (age 65); New Orleans, Louisiana
- Occupations: Composer, violinist
- Years active: 1985 – present
- Website: www.andrewwaggoner.com

Andrew Waggoner (born November 10, 1960) is an American composer and violinist.

== Biography ==
Andrew Waggoner grew up in New Orleans, Minneapolis and Atlanta, and studied at the New Orleans Center for Creative Arts, the Eastman School of Music and Cornell University. His music has been commissioned and performed by the Academy of St. Martin-in-the-Fields, the Los Angeles Philharmonic, the Saint Louis, Denver, Syracuse, and Winnipeg Symphonies, the Cassatt, Corigliano, Miro, and Villiers Quartets, the Pittsburgh New Music Ensemble, the California EAR Unit, pianist Gloria Cheng, violist Melia Watras, ‘cellist Robert Burkhart, the Bohuslav Martinu Philharmonic of Zlin, Czech Republic, Sequitur, the Empyrean Ensemble, Buglisi-Foreman Dance, Ensemble X, CELLO, Flexible Music, Ensemble Nordlys, of Denmark, and Ensemble Accroche Note, of France.

Together with his wife, cellist Caroline Stinson, he is Co-Artistic Director of the Catskills-based Weekend of Chamber Music.

Waggoner was awarded a Guggenheim Fellowship in 2005. A Fromm Foundation Commission supported Waggoner's Fifth String Quartet, written for the Lydian String Quartet.

== Compositions ==
=== String chamber works ===
- Down/Up for ob., vn., va., vc. (11′), 2014.
- Genome of the Soul, for string quartet, 2 vns., va., vc. (11′), 2009.
- My Penelope (String Quartet no. 4), (23′), 2006
- Soon, the Rosy-Fingered Dawn, vn., va., vc. (13′), 2006.
- Stretched on the Beauty, 4 ‘cellos (8’), 2009.
- Third String Quartet (18′), 2003.
- Legacy, st. qt. (7′), 1998, recorded by the Corigliano Quartet on CRI/New World
- Strophic Variations for String Quartet "A Song", (25′), 1988, recorded by the Cassatt Quartet for CRI/New World.
- I Want to Go With the Wolves, for string quartet and antiphonal howling children (6′), 1990.
- Hexacorda Mollia (String Quartet), 2016. Commission for the Smart & Active Matter Conference at Syracuse University. Debuted by the JACK Quartet, June 22, 2016.

=== Chamber music with piano ===
- Story of Alice Munro, and dedicated to John and Rosemary Harbison, 2013.
- Catenary, vc., pf. (11′), 2008.
- Tales of Home, for piano trio, vn., vc., pf. (12′), 2008.
- Inventory of Terrors for piano quintet, 2 vns., va., vc., pf. (15′), 2009.
- Elle s’enfuit (Encore-Fugue for viola and piano), va., pf. (8′), 2003.
- Livre, vc., pf. (11′), for Caroline Stinson; 2014.
- Langue et parole, vn., pf. (12′), 2005.
- Story-Sonata, va., pf. (15′), 2000.

=== Mixed ensemble ===
- Summer, cl., vn., vc., pf. (9′), 2012.
- An Oracle Unheard, 10 Dramatic Movements after Herodotus, narr.; cl., vn., vc., va., pf. (25′), 2012.
- Souffrir/symphonier, fl., ob., 2 gt., vn., vc. (10′), 2015.
- One Kindness, cl., vn., vc., pf. (14′), 2010.
- Catena di cuori, fl., pf. (6′), 2008.
- Exorcist, sax., gt., perc., pf. (12′), 2007.
- The Desires of Ghosts, fl., cl., vn., va., pf. (9′), 2000.
- Pierrot Tells the Time... , fl., cl., vn., va., vc., pc., pf. (9′); 1997.
- Shared Presence (Commune présence), ob., cl., bn., hn., 2 vn., va., vc., pf. (8′), 1999.
- Going... , fl., vn., cbn., cb. (12′), 1988.

== Discography ==
- Quantum Memoir – concertos by Andrew Waggoner for guitar (soloist Kenneth Meyer), piano (soloist Gloria Cheng), and violin (soloist Michael Lim), with the Seattle Modern Orchestra, Julia Tai, conductor. Label: Bridge Records, 2019.
- Terror and Memory – Works by Andrew Waggoner performed by Open End, Andrew Waggoner, Ensemble Nordlys, Flexible Music, Corigliano Quartet, Caroline Stinson and Molly Morkoski. Label: Albany Records. January 2012
- Legacy – Works by Andrew Waggoner performed by Cassatt Quartet, Corigliano Quartet, and others. Label: Composer Recordings. 2001
