= Tassilo Adam =

German ethnologist, photographer and filmmaker

Tassilo Adam (1878–1955) was a German ethnologist, photographer and filmmaker in what is now Indonesia. Adam photographed palaces, rulers and royal sights in Java, Indonesia. He also worked in Sumatra and other locations in the Dutch East Indies. Adam donated photographs of the Batak people and other Sumatran ethnic groups, as well as notes on central Javanese dance to the Royal Tropical Institute in Amsterdam in August 1944.

== Early life ==
Adam was born in Munich in 1878 to the German painter Emil Adam and an Italian mother. At 16 he studied in Vienna and decided to visit the Batak people in Sumatra. He worked on a Dutch tobacco plantation in Deli, Sumatra.

His experiences included illnesses such as malaria and dengue fever. He took a sick leave and returned to Vienna in 1912, marrying his wife Johanna.

== Dutch East Indies ==
He returned to the Dutch East Indies in 1914 and set up a dark room in Pematangsiantar. He photographed the Kubus, the people of Nias Island, and the Batak. He also collected Batak artifacts which he distributed to Dutch museums. He learned the Batak language and wrote a book on Malay-Batak grammar in 1948 with James Butler.

In 1921 he moved his family to Yogyakarta on Java where he established another photographic studio. He had three children in Sumatra, Lilo, Claus and Inge, and did portraiture and filmed and photographed royal dances and rituals with the permission of Sultan Hamengku Buwono VIII.

Adam documented Wayang Wong theatre, the Wayang Topeng, the Kuda Kepang (Horse Dance), the Serimpi, Bedoyo dances, and Javanese Shadow puppet shows. His photographs also captured the batik costumes used. Other events he documented include the circumcision of a royal prince of the Susunahan of Solo, Indonesia.

== Later life ==
After contracting amoebic dysentery for a third time, he returned to Europe in 1926. He lectured, and sold pictures and films to German language magazines while visiting Salzburg, Vienna, the Netherlands and New York City, where Adam worked as associate curator of oriental art from 1929 to 1933 at the Brooklyn Museum.

His son Claus Adam was a cellist.

== Bibliography ==
- "A Personal Experience with Malaria", Knickerbocker Weekly, December 27, 1943
- "Batak Days and Ways", Asia; The American Journal on the Orient, February 1930, 118–125; 134–141.
- "Wayang Wong: the Javanese Theatre", Knickerbocker Weekly, September 1943, 25–26.

== Gallery ==
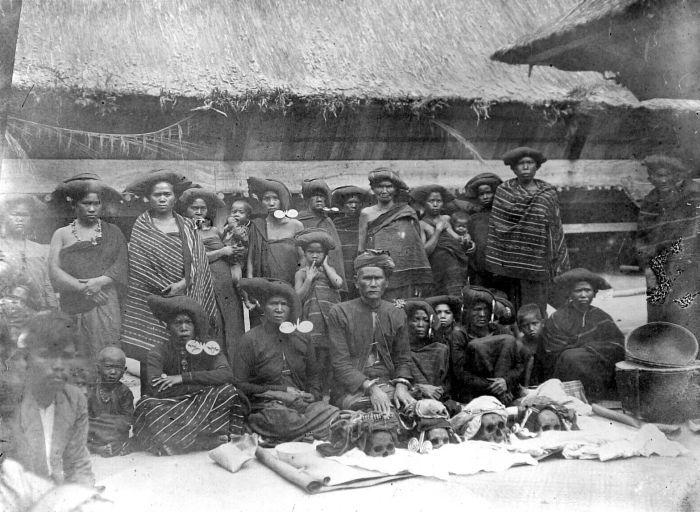
A "Karo-Batakse" man with his family and the skulls of his ancestors (1918), photo by Tassilo Adam

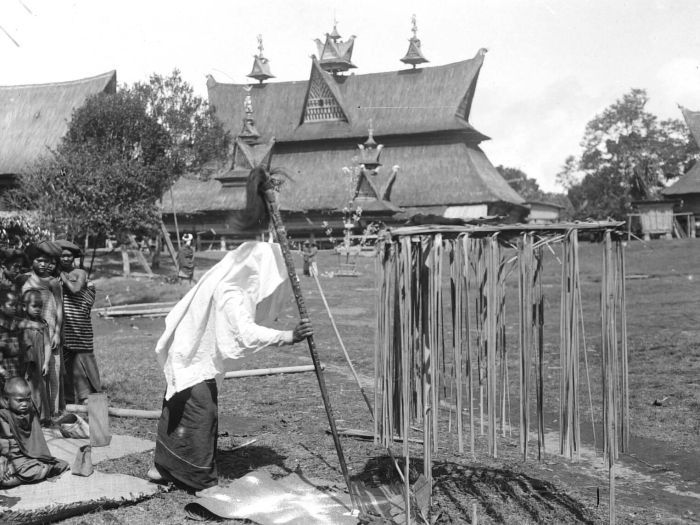
A Karo-Batak shaman performs rituals with a wand, egg and chameleon in a ceremony in the village "Kabanjahe" Sumatra. In the background the house of Pa Mbelgah

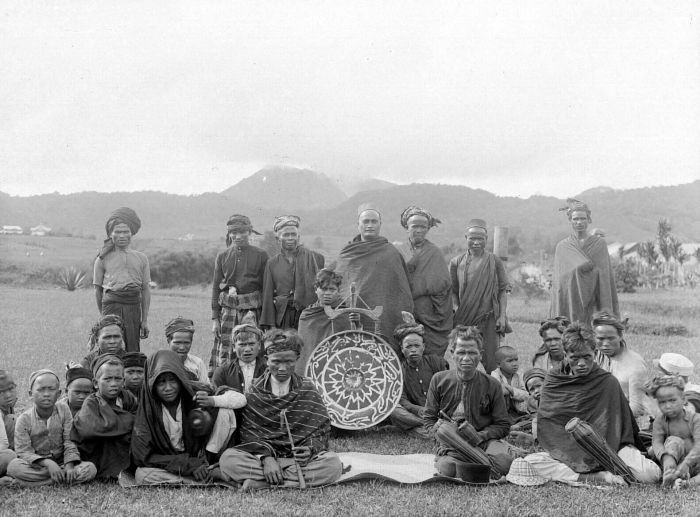
A Karo people (Indonesia) orchestra with Sibayak in the background

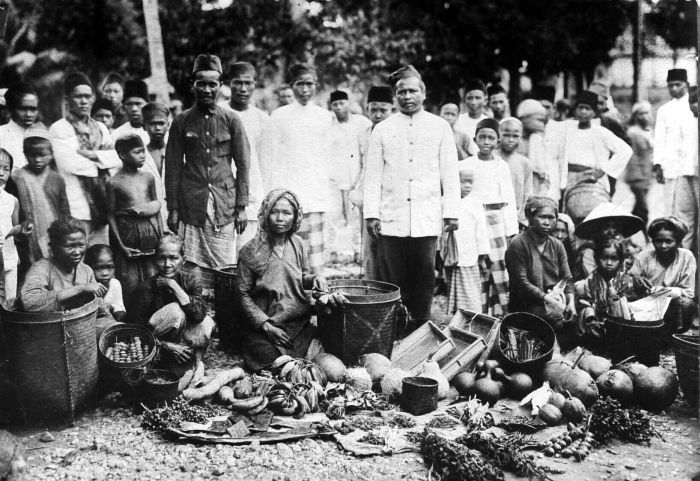
Fruitmarket in Sarolangun, Jambi, Sumatra circa 1918

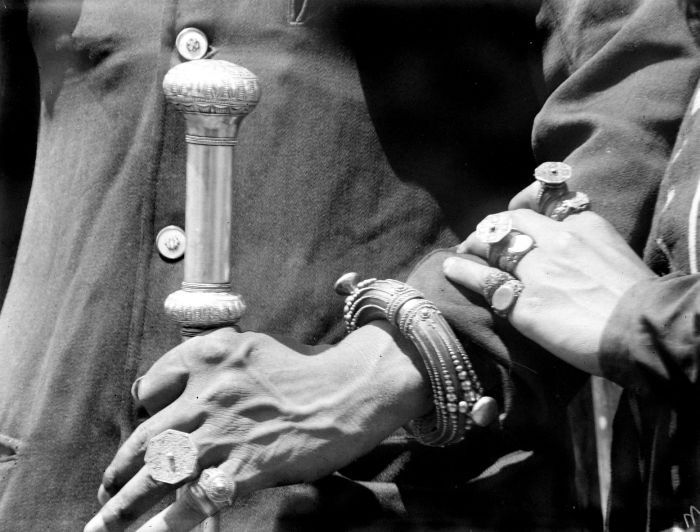
Karo hands with jewelry and a staff

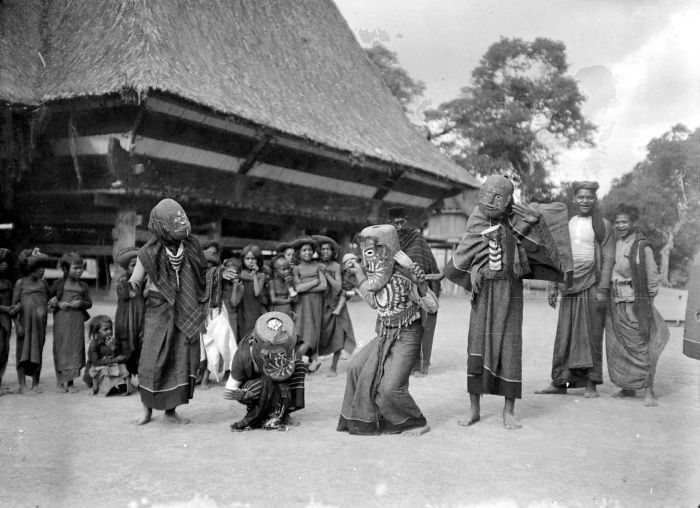
Karo masked dancers

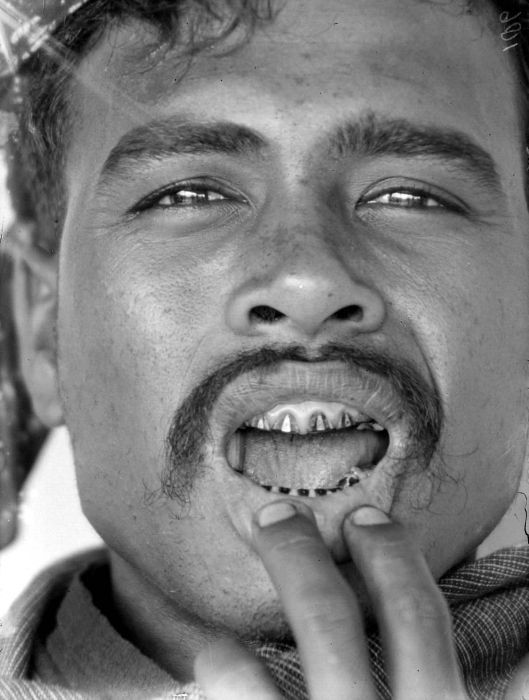
Karo man with filed teeth

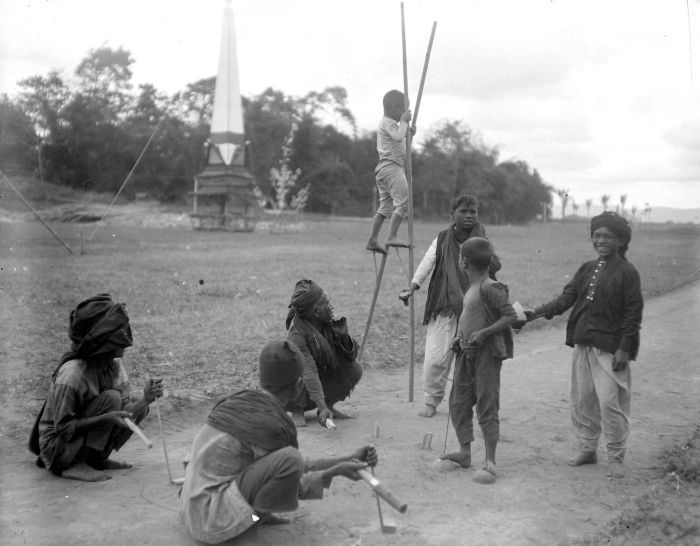
Karo children playing with stilts and croquet

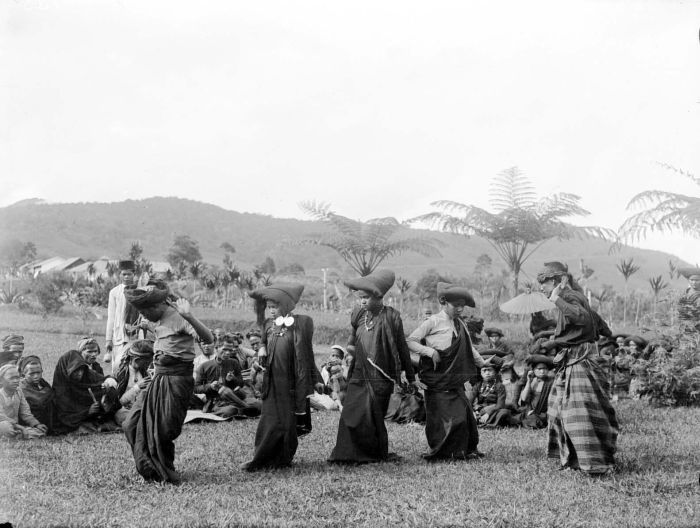
Karo women dance

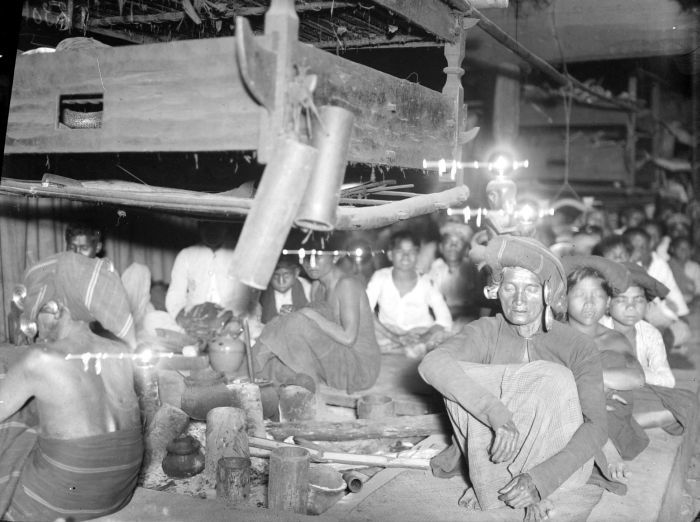
Interior of a Karoland house

== See also ==
- Kassian Cephas, court photographer for the VI Sultan of Java
