= New World String Quartet =

The New World String Quartet was a classical music string quartet formed in Grand Rapids, Michigan, United States, in 1975 and active through the early 1990s. Founding members were: Yosef Yankelev and William Patterson, violins; Yuri Vasilaki, viola; and Ross Harbaugh, cello. These were also the members in a 1981 Minnesota Public Radio interview and performance. As of 1983, members were: Curtis J. Macomber and William Patterson, violins; Robert Dan, viola; and Ross T. Harbaugh, cello. These are also the members listed on the quartet's recording of Ben Johnston's String Quartet No. 6. As of 1985, members were: Curtis Macomber and Vahn Armstrong, violins; Robert Dan, viola; and Ross Harbaugh, cello. Members on recordings in the late 1980s and early 1990s included Curtis Macomber and Vahn Armstrong, violins; Benjamin Simon, viola; and Ross Harbaugh, cello. The quartet also recorded a Brahms piano quintet with Derek Han, piano.

The quartet won the Walter W. Naumburg Foundation Chamber Music award in 1979. In 1980 the New World String Quartet became the first quartet-in-residence at Harvard University. The quartet was awarded a Grand Prix du Disque in 1991 for their recording of the string quartets of Debussy, Ravel, and Henri Dutilleux.

== Discography ==
- Ben Johnston: String Quartet No. 6 (1980) on the Walter W. Naumburg Award LP record
- Brahms: String Quartet No. 1 in C-Minor, Op. 51; String Quartet No. 2 in A-Minor, Op. 51
- Brahms: Quintet in F-Minor; String Quartet No.3
- Schubert: String Quartet No.14 in D-minor 'Death and the Maiden'; String Quartet No.9 in G-minor
- French Music For String Quartet: Debussy: String Quartet in G minor; Ravel: String Quartet in F; Dutilleux: Ainsli La Nuit
- Janacek: The Two String Quartets
