= William Primrose =

Scottish violist and teacher (1904–1982)

William Primrose CBE
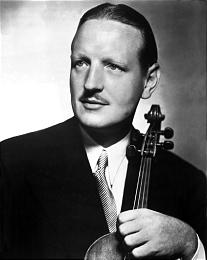
- Born: 23 August 1904; Glasgow, Scotland
- Died: 1 May 1982 (aged 77); Provo, Utah, U.S.
- Occupation: Violist
- Spouse(s): Dorothy Fanny Friend (m. 1928–1951; her death); Hiroko Sawa (m. 1970–1982; his death)
- Children: 6

William Primrose (23 August 1904 – 1 May 1982) was a Scottish violist and teacher. He performed with the London String Quartet from 1930 to 1935. He then joined the NBC Symphony Orchestra where he formed the Primrose Quartet. He performed in various countries around the world as a soloist throughout his career. He also taught at several universities and institutions. He authored several books on viola technique.

== Biography ==
=== Early years ===
William Primrose was born in Glasgow, Scotland to John Primrose and Margaret McInnis (Whiteside) Primrose. He was the oldest of their three children. His father, John Primrose, taught violin and was part of the Scottish Orchestra. His father bought Primrose his first violin in 1908, when Primrose was only 4 years old. That same year, his father arranged violin lessons with Camillo Ritter, who had studied with Joseph Joachim and Otakar Ševčík. Primrose performed his first public concert on the violin in 1916, at the age of 12, playing Mendelssohn's Violin Concerto. During his childhood, Primrose also enjoyed reading and playing chess in addition to studying music and performing.

In 1919, Primrose's family moved to London, and he began to study violin at the Guildhall School of Music in London on scholarship, where he would later be named Fellow. Primrose graduated in 1924, having received its highest honour, a gold medal, although he admitted that he skipped some of his classes because the violin did not interest him.

On the urging of the accompanist Ivor Newton, Primrose moved to Belgium to study under Eugène Ysaÿe from 1926 to 1929. Ysaÿe heard Primrose play an Amati viola that his father had forbidden him to play, and suggested that Primrose pursue the viola instead of the violin.

=== London String Quartet ===
Primrose became a professional violinist in 1924. In London, on October 2, 1928, William married Dorothy Friend, daughter of Arthur John Friend and Susanna Jane Luscombe. He moved from violin to viola in 1930 when he became the violist of the London String Quartet. He was joined in the group by Warwick Evans, John Pennington, and Thomas Petre. They toured throughout North and South America in the 1930s; however, due to financial pressures of the Great Depression, they disbanded in 1935. After the disbandment of the London String Quartet, Primrose took a variety of jobs; he performed in Berlin, at La Scala in Milan, and a number of concerts in England.

=== NBC Orchestra and the Primrose Quartet ===
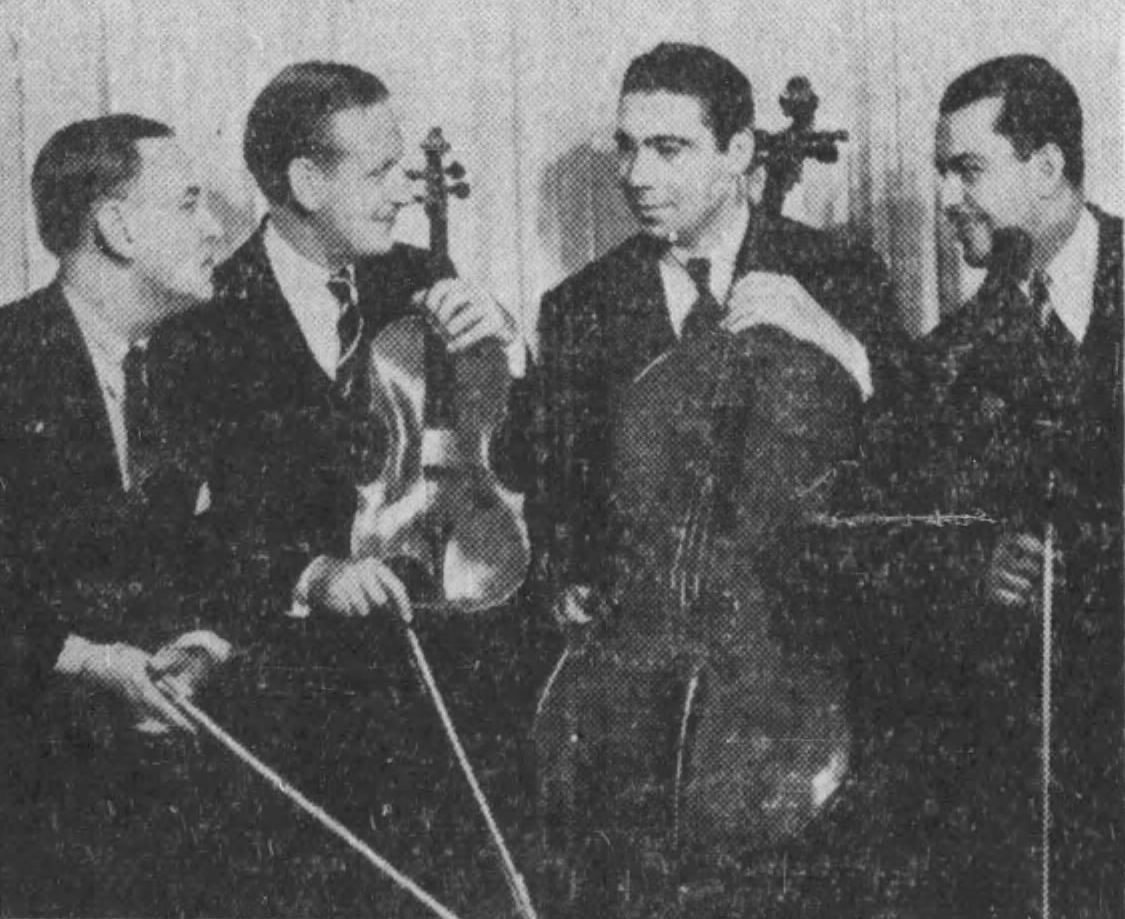
Primrose (second from left) with members of the Primrose Quartet

In 1937, NBC established their namesake symphony orchestra under Arturo Toscanini. Primrose was a violist for the orchestra, but he was never their principal violist. He played with the orchestra for four years until it was rumored that Toscanini would leave the Symphony in 1941.

In 1939, NBC suggested that Primrose form his own group, and the Primrose Quartet was founded. The other players (all with the NBC Orchestra at the time) were Oscar Shumsky, Josef Gingold and Harvey Shapiro. Primrose boasted that "no quartet ever played that had the instrumental ability of my quartet". The Primrose Quartet was short-lived, but recorded three sets of commercial 78s for RCA, along with a few unissued recordings.

While performing with the NBC Symphony, Primrose also made recordings with Jascha Heifetz and Gregor Piatigorsky. However, they stopped playing together in 1964 due to Primrose's declining hearing and his increased absences due to his teaching career.

=== Soloist ===
Primrose made his debut as a violin soloist in 1923; however his soloist career playing the viola didn't take off until 1941 when he started touring with Richard Crooks. He accompanied Crooks on five tours in the next four years, playing in 32 concerts in 1941–1942. While touring with Crooks, Arthur Judson, an influential concert manager, sought out Primrose. He signed with Judson who furthered Primrose's soloist career. Primrose doubled his concert performances, playing in 64 concerts in 1943–1944.

In 1944, he was the soloist in the first studio recording of Berlioz's Harold in Italy with the Boston Symphony Orchestra and Serge Koussevitzky.That same year, he commissioned a viola concerto from Béla Bartók. This was left incomplete at Bartók's death in 1945, and had to wait four years for its completion by Tibor Serly.Primrose was the soloist in the world premiere performance of the concerto in America, on 2 December 1949, with the Minneapolis Symphony Orchestra and Antal Doráti conducting.He gave the European premiere at the Edinburgh Festival in 1950 with Sir John Barbirolli and The Hallé orchestra. In 1950, Benjamin Britten wrote for him Lachrymae based on the song by Dowland.

Primrose was known for his tremendous technique. When he performed Paganini's violin caprices on viola, Mischa Elman is said to have exclaimed, "It must be easier on viola!" Primrose wrote many transcriptions and arrangements for viola, often technically dazzling, including "La Campanella" (from Paganini's second violin concerto) and the famous Nocturne from Borodin's second string quartet, the latter "out of jealousy" for the cello's long melodic lines.

He was made a Commander of the Order of the British Empire (CBE) in 1952, in recognition of his musical contributions.

=== Teacher ===
Primrose was also a teacher during his violist career. He taught in many countries across the world, including the Curtis Institute of Music in Philadelphia. He taught at the University of Southern California from 1961 to 1965 with Jascha Heifetz. After teaching at USC, he moved to the Indiana University Jacobs School of Music where he remained from 1965 to 1972. In 1971, Primrose went to the Tokyo University of the Arts and the Toho Gakuen School of Music. He occasionally taught at Juilliard School, Eastman School of Music and the Sydney Conservatorium of Music, In Australia, Richard Tognetti was one of his students. Primrose was a guest lecturer at Brigham Young University from 1979 to 1982.

Primrose wrote and contributed to several books on viola playing: Art and Practice of Scale Playing (1954), Technique is Memory (1960), Violin and Viola (with Yehudi Menuhin and Denis Stevens, 1976), and Playing the Viola (1988).

Some of his notable students include Canadian violinist Albert Pratz, former principal of the Los Angeles Philharmonic Alan de Veritch, the American composer David Campbell, and Olympic Music Festival founder and violist Alan Iglitzin, who was a member of the Philadelphia String Quartet..

Other notable pupils include, Martha Strongin Katz, Karen Tuttle, Joseph de Pasquale and Cynthia Phelps.

=== Later years ===
Primrose had developed a hearing problem in 1946 which affected his ability to hear certain notes. He was later diagnosed with cancer in 1977, from which he died in Provo, Utah on 1 May 1982.

=== Legacy ===
- Primrose's large collection of annotated viola scores became the nucleus for the William Primrose International Viola Archive at the Harold B. Lee Library at Brigham Young University.
- For his contribution to the recording industry, Primrose has a star on the Hollywood Walk of Fame at 6801 Hollywood Boulevard in Los Angeles.
- The Primrose International Viola Competition, created in 1979 in honor of William Primrose, was the first international music competition for viola players.
- The Primrose Piano Quartet, a British ensemble formed in 2004, is named after him.

== Instruments ==
=== Primrose Amati viola ===
For the first part of his career, Primrose played an Amati viola, formerly owned by his father. Primrose had noted that the viola had a wolf tone and did not project easily. He sold the Amati viola in 1951. The ex-Primrose Amati is now owned by Roberto Díaz, who is currently the president of the Curtis Institute of Music and recorded a CD of Primrose's transcriptions for Naxos Records. Prior to the recording, the viola was inspected and was found to have had adjustments of questionable workmanship, which were subsequently repaired.

=== The Primrose Guarneri viola ===
In 1954, Primrose purchased the 1697 Guarneri viola now known as the ex-Primrose. This viola is one of seven known Guarneri family violas. It bears an original label of Andrea Guarneri who died in 1698, but experts believe that the work is that of his son Joseph Guarneri 'filius Andreae' who inherited his father's workshop. The back of the viola is Italian maple and the front is open-grained spruce. It has a deep golden varnish with a subtle orange tint.

The viola was purchased by the Earl of Harrington in 1874. It was acquired by the Rembert Wurlitzer Company in the 1950s and came to Primrose's attention. It became his solo instrument. Before Primrose, the instrument had never been owned by a professional violist. In 1975 or 1978 Primrose sold the Guarneri viola to Gary Vandosdale, a former student. It was then sold in 1978 to Ulrich Fritze, who played the viola during his 30-year tenure as principal violist of the Berlin Philharmonic. The viola was sold in 2012 by Tarisio "for over $4 million, the highest price paid for a Guarneri family instrument at auction and the highest publicly recorded price for a viola of any type".

=== Other instruments ===
Primrose was also known to have owned two violas by William Moennig Jr. of Philadelphia. Primrose used the "MacDonald" Stradivari on loan during the 1940s. His Pierre Vidoudez and Yu Iida violas are currently on display in the Primrose International Viola Archive at Brigham Young University's Harold B. Lee Library in Provo, Utah.

== Books ==
- The Art and Practice of Scale Playing on the Viola (1954)
- Technique is Memory. A method for violin and viola players based on finger patterns, etc. (1960)
- Walk on the North Side: Memoirs of a Violist. Provo, Utah: Brigham Young University Press, 1978.
- Playing the Viola: Conversations with William Primrose. New York: Oxford University Press, 1988.
