= Walter W. Naumburg Foundation =

Music foundation

The Walter W. Naumburg Foundation sponsors competitions and provides awards for young classical musicians in North America. Founded in 1925, it operates the prestigious Naumburg Competition.

== Foundation and concerts ==
It was founded in 1925 by Walter Wehle Naumburg, a wealthy amateur cellist and son of noted New York City music patron and philanthropist Elkan Naumburg. Elkan Naumburg, owner of the eminent Wall Street bank E. Naumburg & Co., founded the Naumburg Orchestral Concerts in 1905. The concerts were originally performed at the bandstand on the concert ground of New York's Central Park, and starting in 1923 were performed in the Naumburg Bandshell at the same location.

== Naumburg Competition ==
The Naumburg Competition is one of the oldest and most prestigious music competitions in the world. The website San Francisco Classical Voice writes that "the Naumburg Competition has one of the best track records of selecting young musicians who, in short order, build significant careers". The first competition was held in 1926. In an open audition format, pianists, violinists, and cellists were all eligible to compete. In 1928 it was expanded to include vocalists. The prize included cash awards and the opportunity to play concerts in New York's Town Hall, which virtually insured reviews by New York's most influential music critics. In 1946, Aaron Copland and William Schuman joined the Naumburg Foundation board of directors, and shortly afterwards the Foundation began awarding composers with recording projects. In 1961, the format of the competition was changed into a professional competition with a single winner, for one particular discipline. In 1965, the competition was expanded to include chamber music ensembles.

Since the early 1970s, the Naumburg Competition has generally rotated three different categories – piano, strings, and voice – on a triennial basis (although there have also been competitions for flute, clarinet, and classical guitar). Winners receive a cash prize and two recital appearances in Alice Tully Hall. Other opportunities include a recording project, a commission (to be premiered in one of the Alice Tully Hall recitals) and many performance opportunities throughout the United States.

Previous winners of the International Naumburg Competition include Nadja Salerno-Sonnenberg, Elmar Oliveira, Dawn Upshaw, Robert Mann, Adele Marcus, Jorge Bolet, Kun-Woo Paik, Leonidas Kavakos, Abbey Simon, William Kapell, Stephen Hough, and Harvey Shapiro. Winners of the Chamber Music Award include the American, Brentano, Miro, and Muir string quartets, and the Eroica Trio.

=== Winners ===
1925
Catherine Wade-Smith, violinist
Adeline Masino, violinist
Bernard Ocko, violinist

1926
Phyllis Kraeuter, cellist
Margaret Hamilton, pianist
Sonia Skalka, pianist

1927
Dorothy Kendrick, pianist
William Sauber, pianist
Sadah Schwartz-Shuchari, violinist
Daniel Saidenberg, cellist
Julian Kahn, cellist

1928
Adele Marcus, pianist
Helen Berlin, violinist
Louis Kaufman, violinist
Olga Zundel, cellist
George Rasely, tenor
August Werner, baritone

1930
Helen McGraw, pianist
Ruth Culbertson, pianist
Mila Wellerson, cellist
Louise Bernhardt, contralto

1931
Lillian Rehberg Goodman, cellist
Marguerite Hawkins, soprano
Edwiria Eustis, contralto
Kurtis Brownell, tenor

1932
Milo Miloradovich, soprano
Foster Miller, bass-baritone
Dalies Frantz, pianist
Huddie Johnson, pianist
Inez Lauritano, violinist

1933
Catherine Carver, pianist
Harry Katzman, violinist

1934
Joseph Knitzer, violinist
Ruby Mercer, soprano

1935
Benjamin De Loache, baritone
Judith Sidorsky, pianist
Aniceta Shea, soprano
Harvey Shapiro, cellist
Florence Vickland, soprano
Marshall Moss, violinist

1936
Frederick Buldrini, violinist

1937
Jorge Bolet, pianist
Ida Krehm, pianist
Pauline Pierce, mezzo-soprano
Maurice Bialkin, cellist

1938
Carroll Glenn, violinist

1939
Mara Sebriansky, violinist
William Horne, tenor
Zadel Skolovsky, pianist
Gertrude Gibson, soprano

1940
Abbey Simon, pianist
Harry Cykman, violinist
Thomas Richner, pianist

1941
William Kapell, pianist
Robert Mann, violinist
Lura Stover, soprano

1942
Jane Rogers, contralto
Annette Elkanova, pianist
David Sarser, violinist

1943
Dolores Miller, violinist
Constance Keene, pianist
Ruth Geiger, pianist

1944
Jeanne Therrien, pianist
Jean Carlton, soprano
Carol Brice, contralto

1945
Jane Boedeker, mezzo-soprano
Paula Lenchner, soprano

1946
Leonid Hambro, pianist
Jeanne Rosenblum, pianist
Anahid Ajemian, violinist

1947
Berl Senofsky, violinist
Abba Bogin, pianist
Jane Carlson, pianist

1948
Sidney Harth, violinist
Paul Olefsky, cellist
Theodore Lettvin, pianist

1949
Lorne Munroe, cellist

1950
Angelene Collins, soprano
Esther Glazer, violinist
Betty-Jean Hagen, violinist
Margaret Barthel, pianist

1951
June Kovach, pianist
Laurel Hurley, soprano
Joyce Flissler, violinist

1952
Diana Steiner, violinist
Yoko Matsuo, violinist
Lois Marshall, soprano

1953
Gilda Muhlbauer, violinist
Lee Cass, bass-baritone
Georgia Laster, soprano

1954
William Doppmann, pianist
Jean Wentworth, pianist
Jules Eskin, cellist
Martha Flowers, soprano

1955
Ronald Leonard, cellist
Mary MacKenzie, contralto
Nancy Cirillo, violinist

1956
Donald McCall, cellist
Wayne Conner, tenor
George Katz, pianist

1957
Regina Sarfaty, mezzo-soprano
Angelica Lozada, soprano
Michael Grebanier, cellist

1958
Joseph Schwartz, pianist
Shirley Verrett, mezzo-soprano
Elaine Lee, violinist

1959
Howard Aibel, pianist
Sophia Steffan, soprano
Ralph Votapek, pianist

1960
Joseph Silverstein, violinist

1961
Werner Torkanowsky, conductor

1964
Elizabeth Mosher, soprano

1968
Jorge Mester, conductor

1971
Kun-Woo Paik, pianist
Zola Shaulis, pianist

1972
Robert Davidovici, violinist

1973 Voice
Edmund LeRoy, baritone first prize
Barbara Hendricks, soprano second prize
Susan Davenny-Wyner, soprano third prize

1974 Piano
Andre-Michel Schub, first prize
Edith Kraft, second prize
Dickran Atamian, third prize

1975–76 (50th Anniversary Competitions)
Piano: Dickran Atamian, pianist
Voice: Clamma Dale and Joy Simpson, sopranos (co-winners)
Violin: Elmar Oliveira, violinist

1977 Cello
Nathaniel Rosen, first prize
Thomas Demenga, second prize
Georg Faust, third prize

1978 Flute
Carol Wincenc, first prize
Marya Martin, second prize
Gary Schocker, third prize

1979 Piano
Peter Orth, first prize
Miryo Park, second prize
Panayis Lyras, third prize

1980 Voice (four winners)
Faith Esham, soprano
Irene Gubrud, soprano
Jan Opalach, bass-baritone
Lucy Shelton, soprano

1981 Violin
Nadja Salerno-Sonnenberg

1981 Cello
Colin Carr

1982 Viola
Thomas Riebl

1983 Piano
Stephen Hough, first prize
David Allen Wehr, second prize
William Wolfram, third prize

1984 Violin (No first prize awarded)
Carmit Zori, second prize
Ian Swensen, second prize (co-winners)

1985 Voice
Dawn Upshaw, soprano, first prize
Christopher Trakas, baritone, first prize

1985 Clarinet
Charles Neidich, first prize
John Grey, second prize
Daniel McKelway, third prize

1986 Cello
Andrés Diáz, first prize
Truls Mørk, second prize
Peter Wiley, third prize

1987 Piano
Anton Nel, first prize
Andrew Wilde, second prize
William Wolfram, third prize

1988 Violin
Leonidas Kavakos, first prize
Peter Winograd, second prize
Peter Matzka, third prize

1989 Voice
Stanford Olsen, tenor, first prize
David Malis, baritone, second prize
Marietta Simpson, mezzo-soprano, third prize

1990 Cello
Hai-Ye Ni, first prize
Gustav Rivinius, second prize
Marius May, third prize

1991 Viola
Misha Amory, first prize
Paul Coletti, second prize
Roberto Diáz, third prize

1992 Piano
Awadagin Pratt, first prize
Mikhail Yanovitsky, second prize
Alan Gampel, third prize

1993 Violin
Tomohiro Okumura, first prize
Yehonatan Berick, second prize
Michael Shih, third prize

1994 Voice
Theresa Santiago, soprano, first prize
Leon Williams, baritone, second prize
Christópheren Nomura, baritone, third prize

1996 Classical guitar
Jorge Caballero, first prize
Jason Vieaux, second prize
Kevin Gallagher, third prize

1997 Piano
Steven Osborne, first prize
Anthony Molinaro, first prize (co-winners)

1998 Violin
Axel Strauss, first prize
Jasmine Lin, second prize
Jennifer Frautschi, third prize

1999 Voice
Stephen Salters, baritone, first prize
Randall Scarlata, baritone, second prize
Hyunah Yu, soprano, third prize

2001 Violoncello
Clancy Newman, first prize
Li-Wei Qin, first prize (co-winners)

2002 Piano
Gilles Vonsattel, first prize
Konstantin Soukhovetski, second prize
Lev Vinocour, third prize

2003 Violin
Frank Huang, first prize
Ayano Ninomiya, second prize
Sharon Roffman, third prize

2005 Voice
Sari Gruber, first prize
Thomas Meglioranza, second prize
Tyler Duncan, third prize
Amanda Forsythe, honorable mention

2006 Viola
David Carpenter, first prize
Eric Nowlin, second prize
Jonah Sirota, third prize
David Kim, honorable mention

2008 Cello
David Requiro and Anita Leuzinger, first prize
Sébastien Hurtaud, third prize
Saeunn Thorsteindottir, Zara Nelsova Prize
Umberto Clerici, honorable mention
David Eggert, Honorable mention

2010 Piano
Soyeon Lee, first prize
Alexandre Moutouzkine, co-second prize
Ran Dank, co-second prize
Christopher Guzman, honorable mention

2012 Violin
Tessa Lark, first prize
Elly Suh, second prize
Kristin Lee, third prize

2014 Voice
Julia Bullock, first prize
Sidney Outlaw, second prize
Hyo Na Kim, honorable mention
Michael Kelly, Honorable mention

2015 Cello
Lev Sivkov, first prize
Jay Campbell and Brannon Cho, second prize

2017 Piano
Albert Cano Smit and Xiaohui Yang, first prize
Tiffany Poon, second prize

2018 Violin
Grace Park, first prize
Shannon Lee, second prize
Danbi Um, third prize

2021 Voice
Erin Wagner, mezzo-soprano, first prize
Megan Moore, mezzo-soprano, and William Socolof, bass-baritone, second prize

2022 Saxophone
Valentin Kovalev and Andreas Mader, first prize
Robert (Chance) Stine, second prize

2023 Piano
Yang (Jack) Gao, first prize
Anna Han, second prize
Sahun (Sam) Hong, third prize

2024 Cello
Leland Ko, first prize
Jonathan Swensen, first prize (co-winners)
Aaron Wolff, second prize
Alexander Hersh, second prize
James Kim, second prize (co-prize winners)
