= Milo Miloradovich =

American soprano and writer (1897–1972)

- Born: Milka Catherine Dagmar Andrejevich-Miloradovich; January 21, 1897; Spokane, Washington, U.S.
- Died: October 27, 1972 (aged 75); New York City, United States
- Occupations: Soprano; cookbook author; investment fund councillor

Milo Miloradovich (January 21, 1897 – October 27, 1972) was an American soprano opera singer, cookbook author and investment fund councillor.

== Early life and education ==
Miloradovich was born to mother Emma (née von Allmen; 1858–1946) and Serbian father Dušan Miloradović (1856–1928).

Miloradovich was educated in America and Europe. She studied music with Marta Sandal and Conal Quirke (1876–1965), then went to Europe with opera director Jacques Coigny. She continued her studies with British baritone and voice coach Horatio Connell (1876–1936), Kurt Schindler, and American pianist and vocal teacher Walter Golde (1887–1963).

== Career ==
She gave her first recital at the Opéra Royal de Wallonie in Liège, Belgium. After coming back from Europe, she continued with her studies in Spokane, Washington.

In 1918, as Emily Miloradovich, she surprised both her friends and audience by her remarkably finished interpretation of Santuzza in the production Cavalleria Rusticana by the Spokane Opera Company. In 1919, Miloradovich left for New York City, where she performed as Maria Milo.

She later sang in various American companies, including Freya (Das Rheingold), Sieglinde (Die Walküre), Woglinde (Götterdämmerung) and Zerlina (Don Giovanni) in 1930 at the Great German Opera Company in Philadelphia, and in 1931 she sang at the Chautaugua Opera Company. Miloradovich won the 1932 Walter W. Naumburg Competition. She was one of the principal singers with the Chicago Grand Opera Company in 1934.

She had a stint as soloist with Harry Emerson Fosdick's Riverside Church in Manhattan. On 12 January 1937, she performed at a gala event in the prestigious Barbizon Hotel for Women in New York City. Throughout the 1930s, she appeared in orchestra concerts and recitals at the Metropolitan Opera and elsewhere in the country.

In the 1940s when her musical career began to wane, she became a popular cookbook author and in the 1950s, she joined R.W. Pressprich & Co., as an investment fund councillor. Later, she joined the Fiduciary Trust Company (later a division of Franklin Templeton).

Miloradovich was a director of the Norcross Wildlife Sanctuary, a member of New York's Advertising Women's Bond Club and the Herbal Society of America.
