= Jonathan Dwight =

American ornithologist

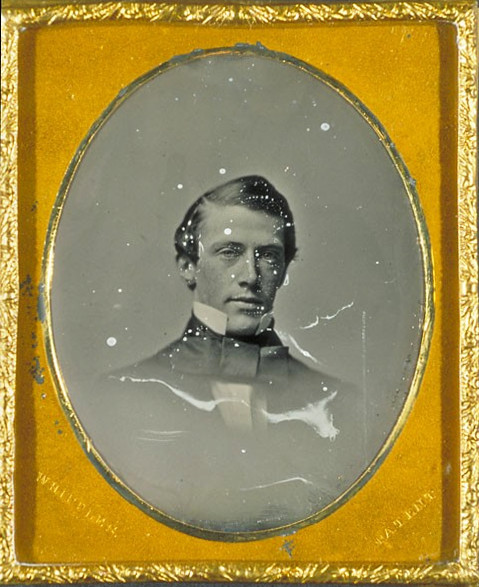
Daguerreotype of civil engineer Jonathan Dwight, Harvard College class of 1852, father of Jonathan Dwight, ornithologist

Jonathan Dwight V (1858–1929) was an American ornithologist.

== Life ==
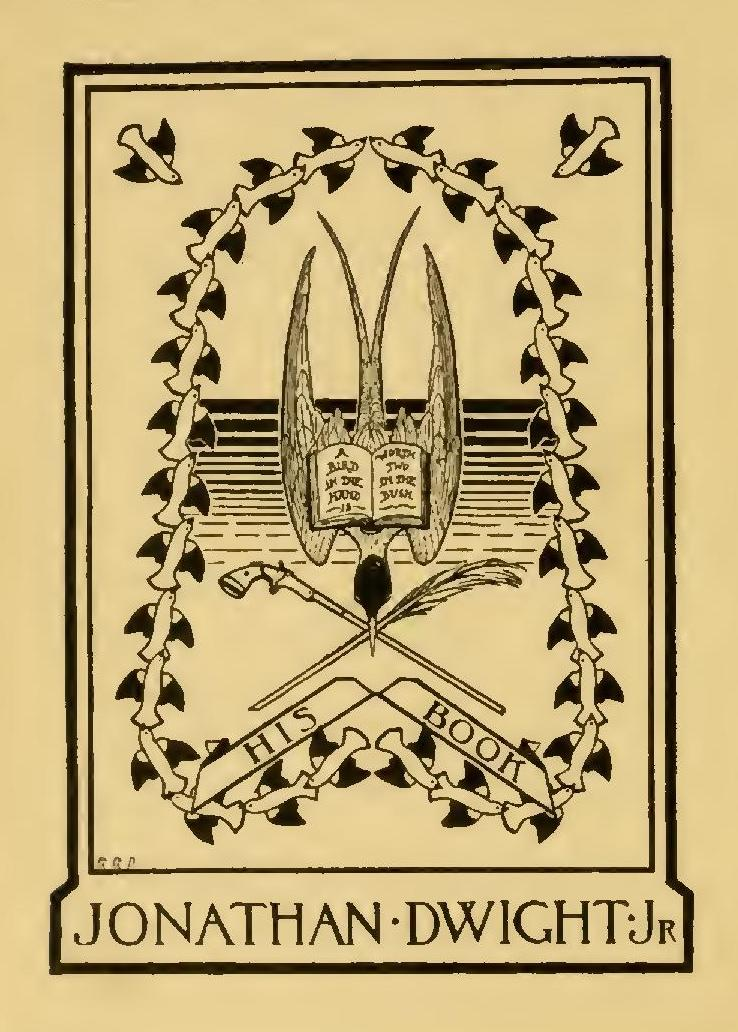
Bookplate from 1896 bird book

Jonathan Dwight was born December 8, 1858, in New York City. His father was civil engineer Jonathan Dwight (1831–1910), grandfather Jonathan Dwight (1799–1856), great grandfather Jonathan Dwight (1772–1840), and great-great grandfather also named Jonathan Dwight (1743–1831), all part of the large New England Dwight family. His mother was Julia Lawrence Hasbrouck. In 1861 the family moved to Madison, New Jersey. His family had a summer home in Tadoussac, Quebec, and his first paper was published in 1879 on the birds observed there. He graduated from Harvard University in 1880, and joined his father in railroad design.

He enlisted in the New York National Guard in 1889. After serving in the ambulance corps, he developed an interest in medicine. In 1893 he entered the Columbia University College of Physicians and Surgeons. He worked for a while in a hospital and private practice, but over time devoted more time to the study of birds. Dwight was a member of the American Ornithologists' Union since its founding on September 26, 1883. He was treasurer from 1903 to 1920, vice president until 1923, and president to 1926. The American Museum of Natural History provided a room for his collection in 1909.

He married Georgina Gertrude Rundle (daughter of Richard Plaskett Rundle) in 1901; she died January 29, 1903. He married Ethel Gordon Wishart Adam in 1914. He died of cancer at his home at 43 West 70th Street in New York City on February 22, 1929.

== Legacy ==
After Dwight's death, Fiduciary Trust Company founder Carll Tucker purchased Dwight's collection of ornithology books as a gift for his wife Marcia Brady Tucker, daughter of Anthony N. Brady, a founder of Union Carbide. Marcia Brady Tucker, two-time director of the National Association of Audubon Societies, donated the collection to the Smithsonian Institution in 1970.
