= Pannbacker =

Pannbacker is a surname. Notable people with the surname include:

- Bill Pannbacker, American politician
- Mary Pannbacker (died 2015), American speech-language pathologist
