= Grace Park (violinist) =

American violinist

Grace Park is an American violinist. She was first prize winner at the Naumberg Competition in 2018.

== Biography ==
Grace Park was born in Los Angeles and began to study violin at the age of five. As a child she played with Disney's Young Musicians' Symphony Orchestra from 1997 through 1999, playing at venues that included the Hollywood Bowl and Lincoln Center. She played with the Cal State LA University Orchestra in 1996 and in live broadcasts on local radio stations KUSC and KKGO. As a fourteen-year-old she played an hour long program on a Korean television station, KBS, that included the "Méditation" from Thaïs and the Saint-Saëns Violin Concerto.

She studied violin at the Colburn School of Music, then later Colburn Conservatory and New England Conservatory. Her teachers included Donald Weilerstein, Miriam Fried, Sylvia Rosenberg, and Robert Lipsett.

She has performed as a soloist at Walt Disney Concert Hall, Wigmore Hall, The Kennedy Center, the Metropolitan Museum of Art, and Jordan Hall, Rockefeller University, the Colorado Music Festival, Bard Music Festival, Stern Auditorium at Carnegie Hall with the New York Youth Symphony, Des Moines Symphony, The Sarasota Orchestra, The Mid-Atlantic Symphony Orchestra, Texarkana Symphony Orchestra, The Rudolfinum/Dvořák Hall in Prague with Prague Philharmonia, North Czech Philharmonia, Russian Chamber Philharmonic, and the Orlando Philharmonic Orchestra, and many other venues and ensembles.

Park has also given recitals at Weill Recital Hall, presented by the Walter W. Naumberg Foundation, the Krannert Center for the Performing Arts, Beethoven Minnesota Festival, and Merkin Hall among many other places.

Park performed solo Bach with Yo-Yo Ma at New York City Center and worked with Maxim Vengerov at the Cartagena International Music Festival.

In 2019 she was the featured artist at the WQXR Young Artists Showcase where she played a program of Dvořák, Brahms, and Beethoven with Joseph Liccardo.

In 2025 she released her debut album on the Orchid Classics label. She performed with Emmanuel Villaume and the Prague Philharmonia. The album included Dvořák's Four Romantic Pieces, in a new orchestration by Alex Fortes, and Mozart's Violin Concerto No. 5.

Park was appointed concertmaster of the Virginia Symphony Orchestra in 2025. She also will also create a chamber music series there featuring musicians from the Virginia Symphony Orchestra and guest soloists.

As a chamber musician she has played regularly with Manhattan Chamber Players, Carnegie Hall's Ensemble Connect, and Ensemble Mélange, among many other groups.

She performs on a 1717 Giuseppe Guarneri 'filius Andreae' violin on loan from an anonymous sponsor.

== Discography ==
- 2025 Grace Park: Dvořák, Mozart (Grace Park / Prague Philharmonia / Emmanuel Villaume)
- 2022 Andy Akiho: Oculus
