= Alan Iglitzin =

American violist and Olympic Music Festival founder (1931–2025)

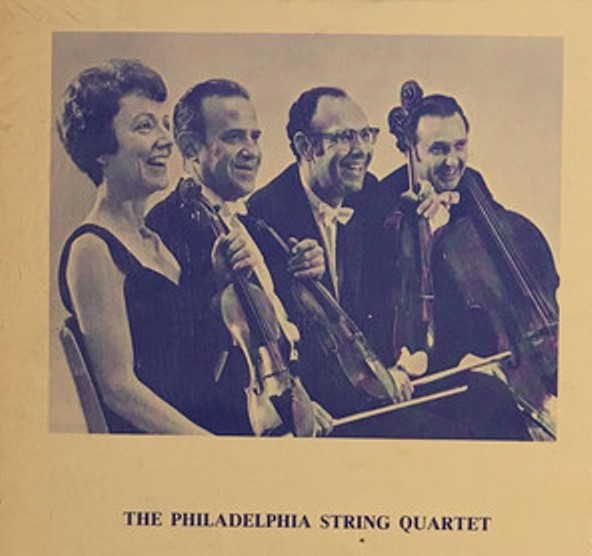
The Philadelphia String Quartet: Veda Reynolds, Irv Eisenberg, Alan Iglitzin, Charlie Brennand.

Alan Iglitzin (November 7, 1931 – September 15, 2025) was an American violist and string quartet player. He was a member of the Philadelphia String Quartet and founded the Olympic Music Festival on the Olympic Peninsula of Washington state.

== Background ==
Iglitzin was born in Harlem, New York, on November 7, 1931. He started playing violin when he was six years old; attending the High School of Music & Art in Manhattan. Iglitzin studied with Scottish violist William Primrose. He studied at Long Island University and later on did graduate work at Hunter College and the University of Minnesota.

== Professional career ==
For several years he was associated with the Aspen Music Festival. In 1953, Iglitzin joined the Minneapolis Symphony and was its assistant solo violist for six years. By 1960, Iglitzin joined the Philadelphia Orchestra. He was the assistant solo violist and principal violist of the Chamber Orchestra of Philadelphia.

=== Philadelphia String Quartet ===
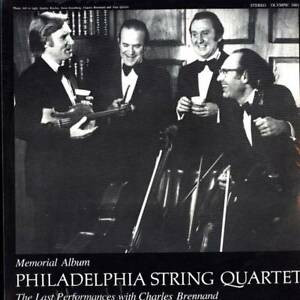
Alan Iglitzin (far right) with the other members of the Philadelphia String Quartet in 1950.

In 1960, Iglitzin, with three other members of the Philadelphia Orchestra, co-founded the Philadelphia String Quartet, with whom he was the violist. The other members were Veda Reynolds, first violinist; Irwin Eisenberg, second violinist; and Charles Brennand, cellist. While the members were still playing with the Philadelphia Orchestra, they worked as a quartet, culminating in a six-concert Carnegie Hall debut.

The group cut ties with the orchestra in 1966 under significant resistance from its administration. Moving to Seattle, they became the quartet-in-residence of the University of Washington.

The Philadelphia String Quartet made tours of South America, Europe and the United States. In 1968, the US State Department invited the Philadelphia String Quartet to become the first American string quartet to perform in India. The quartet performed many new works and premieres. Iglitzin and the quartet also performed as part of the UW Contemporary Group which played all new music. Iglitzin, with the Philadelphia String Quartet, recorded music of American composers, including George Rochberg and Paul Chihara.

=== Olympic Music Festival ===
Iglitzin started the Olympic Music Festival in 1984, originally intending it to be the summer home for the Philadelphia String Quartet, who had come to Seattle in 1966 as the University of Washington’s Quartet-in-Residence. His wife Leigh Hearon served as the festival president. The festival was originally held at Trillium Woods Farm in Quilcene, Washington, a property that once belonged to the Iseri family, a family of Japanese immigrants who had bought the property in 1913. The property was taken away from the Iseri family during the internment of Japanese Americans during World War II. After 32 years of concerts in the barn in Quilcene, the Olympic Music Festival moved to Port Townsend. Since then, the farm in Quilcene has featured the "Concerts in the Barn" summer series, featuring the Carpe Diem String Quartet.

== Personal life and death ==
Iglitzin married his partner, Leigh Hearon, in 2005. They held a traditional Hindu ceremony in Varanasi, India. Iglitzin and Hearon came from Jewish and Catholic backgrounds, respectively.

Iglitzin died on September 15, 2025, at the age of 93.

== Awards ==
According to The Leader, Iglitzin is the only two-time recipient of the Washington State Governor's Award. He was honored with this award in 1972 and 1998.
