= Clancy Newman =

American cellist and composer (born 1977)

Clancy Newman (born 1977) is an American cellist and composer. In 2001 he won first place in the International Naumburg Competition, and in 2004 he received an Avery Fisher Career Grant.

== Early life ==
Newman was born in Albany NY in 1977, to Australian parents. At six he began taking cello lessons, and at 12 he received his first significant public recognition when he won a gold medal at the Dandenong Festival in Australia, open to ages twenty-four and under. Newman went on to attend the Columbia-Juilliard combined program, receiving a BA in English from Columbia and a Masters in Music from Juilliard. His teachers at Juilliard were Joel Krosnick and Harvey Shapiro.

== Solo work ==
In 2001, Newman won first place in the International Naumburg Competition, and as a result he played a recital in Alice Tully Hall. The recital included the world premiere of Kenji Bunch's "Broken Music", which the Naumburg Foundation commissioned. In 2004, he was the recipient of an Avery Fisher Career Grant. His performance of his composition, "The Pizzicato Piece", was featured on A&E's "Breakfast With the Arts".

Newman has performed as soloist in Australia, Asia, and Europe, as well as throughout the United States. He has soloed with such orchestras as the National Symphony, Jacksonville Symphony, Hartford Symphony, Richmond Symphony, Santa Fe Symphony, and North Carolina Symphony, in such halls as Alice Tully, Avery Fisher, Weill, Merkin, Jordan Hall, the Kennedy Center, the Kimmel Center, and Herbst Theatre.

== Chamber music ==
Clancy Newman has attended the Marlboro Music Festival and has been a member of the Chamber Music Society II of Lincoln Center. He is currently a member of the Chicago Chamber Musicians and the Clarosa piano quartet, and a former member of the Weiss-Kaplan-Newman trio (with pianist Yael Weiss and violinist Mark Kaplan).

== Composing ==
Newman has maintained an interest in composition since early childhood, and the bulk of his output has been for chamber music and cello solo. He has been a featured composer on the Chamber Music Society of Lincoln Center's "Double Exposure" series and the Chicago Chamber Musicians' "Composer Perspectives" series, and has received commissions from Astral Artists, the Barnett Foundation, the Carpe Diem String Quartet, the Weiss-Kaplan-Newman trio, and the Silo Collective, among others. His Juxt-Opposition is available on a CD of new American music by the Weiss-Kaplan-Newman trio, alongside those of Paul Schoenfield, Lera Auerbach, and Chen Yi.

His new piano quintet, Cherry Blossom Fantasy, commissioned by the Ryuji Ueno Foundation, will be premiered at the opening ceremony of the 2019 National Cherry Blossom Festival in Washington DC.

== "Pop-Unpopped" project ==
From October 2014 until May 2016, Newman did a project that he called "Pop-Unpopped". This involved writing a solo cello caprice inspired by whatever song was number 1 on the US billboard charts on the first of each month, which he would then learn and post a video of himself playing at the end of the month. In this fashion, he wrote caprices based on songs by Ed Sheeran, Meghan Trainor, Taylor Swift and many others. The project ultimately led to extremely innovative new ways of playing the cello, including fingering with the right hand, plucking behind the finger, extensive col legno, bowing behind the bridge, and drumming.

== The Golden Ratio Method ==
In 2007, Newman devised a new method of composing based on the way some types of trees grow new branches using the golden ratio. Some notable compositions he wrote using this method include Juxt-Opposition (piano trio), From Method to Madness (cello and piano), and Palindromicanon (two cellos). In 2019, he released the first of a series of lecture videos explaining how this method works, and he has appeared as a guest lecturer at various schools and institutions talking about this method.
