= University of Science and Arts of Oklahoma =

Public university in Chickasha, Oklahoma, US

Coordinates: 35°01′53″N 97°57′17″W

- Former names: Oklahoma Industrial Institute and College for Girls (1908–1912); Oklahoma College for Women (1912–1965); Oklahoma College of Liberal Arts (1965–1972)
- Motto: "College for the Curious Mind"
- Type: Public liberal arts college
- Established: 1908
- Endowment: $27,000,000
- President: Kayla Hale
- Students: 1,000
- Location: Chickasha, Oklahoma, United States
- Campus: Small town
- Colors: Green & Gold
- Nickname: Drovers
- Sporting affiliations: NAIA – Sooner
- Mascot: Dusty the Drover
- Website: www.usao.edu
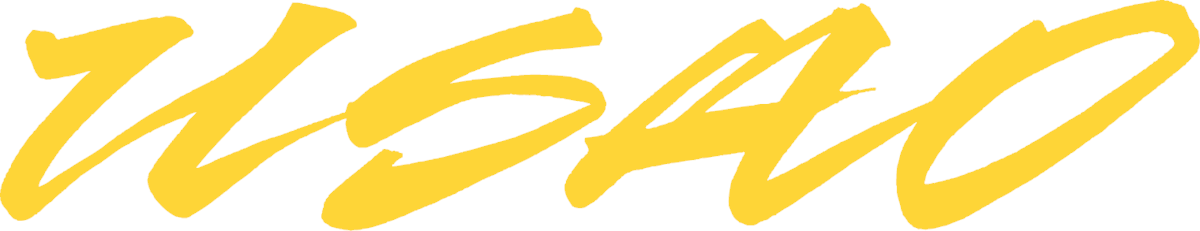
- Oklahoma College for Women Historic District
- U.S. National Register of Historic Places
- U.S. Historic district
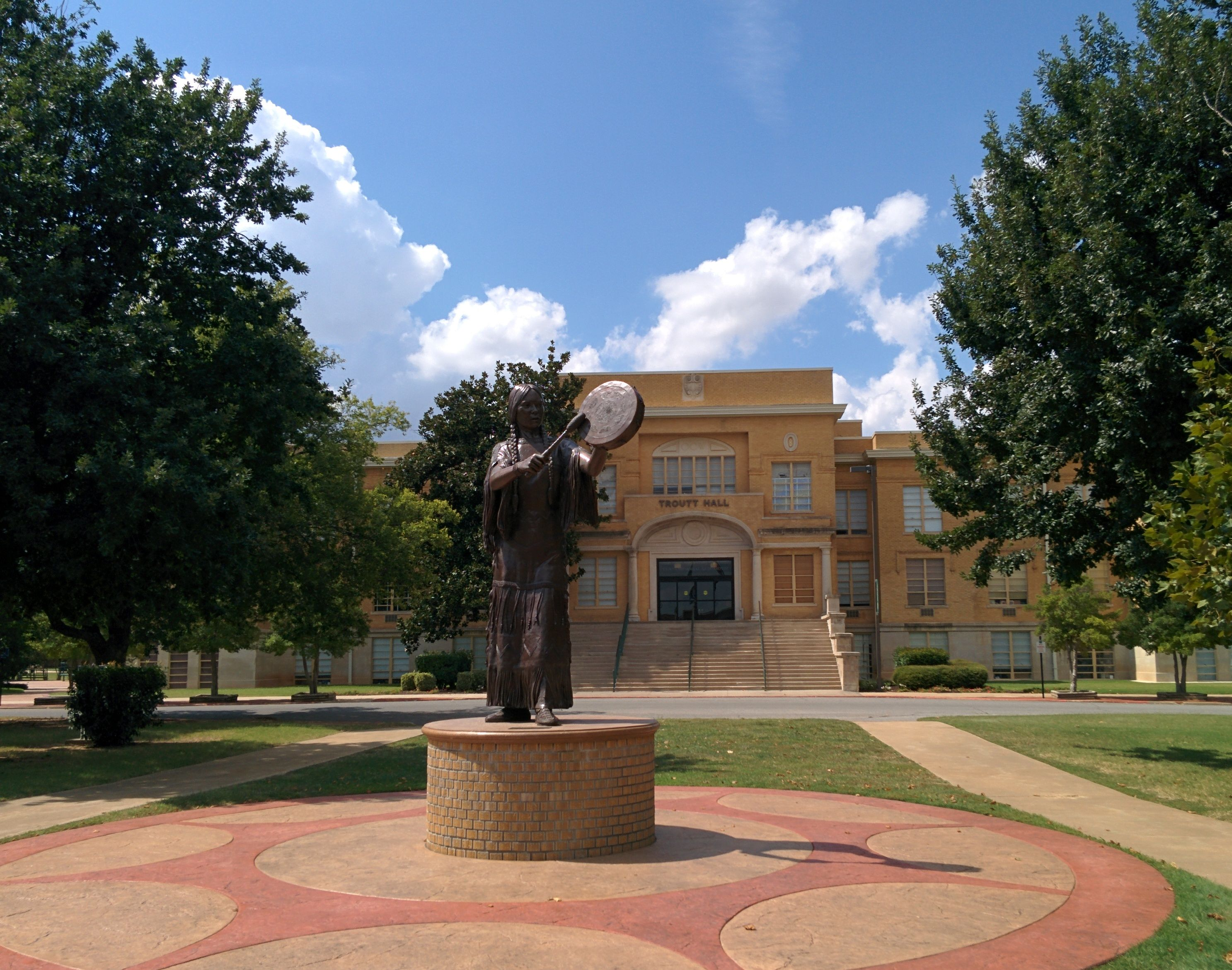

- Location within Oklahoma Location within the United States
- Location: Roughly bounded by Grand Ave., 19th St., Alabama Ave., and alley west of 15th St., Chickasha, Oklahoma
- Area: 50 acres (20 ha)
- Built: 1911
- Architect: Smith & Parr; Donathan & Moore
- Architectural style: Classical Revival, Mission/Spanish Revival
- NRHP reference No.: 01000950
- Added to NRHP: September 9, 2001

The University of Science and Arts of Oklahoma (USAO) is a public liberal arts college in Chickasha, Oklahoma. It is the only public college in Oklahoma with a strictly liberal arts–focused curriculum and is a member of the Council of Public Liberal Arts Colleges. USAO is an undergraduate-only institution and grants bachelor's degrees in a variety of subject areas. The school was founded in 1908 as a school for women and from 1912 to 1965 was known as Oklahoma College for Women. It became coeducational in 1965 and today educates approximately 800 students. In 2001, the entire Oklahoma College for Women campus was listed as a national historic district.

== History ==
After Oklahoma was admitted to statehood in 1907, the new state legislature was tasked with establishing institutions of higher education in the former Indian Territory. Statistics gathered by the State Superintendent of Education showed that many young women from Oklahoma chose to attend women's colleges in Kansas, Texas, and Missouri. Colonel J. T. O'Neil, the state senator from Grady County, and his daughter, Anne Wade O'Neil, who had graduated from a women's college in Mississippi, appealed to the legislature to authorize the creation of a women's college. The institution was founded on May 16, 1908, with the signing of Senate Bill 249 by Governor Charles Haskell. The bill, authored by Senator N. P. Stewart of Hugo, Oklahoma, authorized the foundation of the Oklahoma Industrial Institute and College for Girls. The legislature subsequently appropriated $100,000 for the establishment of the initial buildings for the school.

A local rancher named J. B. Sparks donated land for the college in memory of his daughter, Nellie. Nellie was a Chickasaw descendant and the land had been part of her allotment. The Nellie Sparks Dormitory, which was among the first buildings constructed at the new institution, was named in her honor. In 1912, the institution's authorities renamed the school Oklahoma College for Women. This came about because a probate judge, under the mistaken impression that the "Industrial Institute" was a reform school, sentenced an "incorrigible young woman" to serve time there. This name change was made official by the State Legislature in 1916. Between 1910 and 1927, the school was the southwest terminus of the Chickasha Street Railway, the trolleys of which could take the ladies into town or all the way to the Rock Island railroad depot.

The institution initially offered four years of high school work and four years of college; those who completed the college course were awarded bachelor's degrees. It gradually shifted its focus to college only; by the 1925–1926 school year, only college classes were offered. Though the institution's original name implied strictly industrial training, over the next couple decades, it gained a focus on a broad liberal arts education. By 1930, it was awarding degrees in many different fields of study, including art, English, history, music, several languages, natural and physical sciences, philosophy, home economics, and physical education. The deaf education program increased in size and statewide recognition; today, it continues to be one of the university's important programs. On June 6, 1955, the Oklahoma State Regents for Higher Education adopted the policy that all state-supported institutions would be racially integrated. That summer, Clydia Troullier became the first black student to enroll at OCW.

By the mid-1960s, exclusively female universities were declining throughout the nation. The legislature made the institution coeducational in 1965, and the school was renamed Oklahoma College of Liberal Arts. The Oklahoma State Regents for Higher Education assigned a new mission to the college: it was to be "experimental in nature" and was to "enroll a select group of students whose aspirations and abilities fit them for an intellectually rigorous and accelerated course of study." Under the direction of the ninth President, Robert L. Martin, the college switched to a system of three equal trimesters. In an attempt to attract students interested in vigorous academics, this offered an opportunity for advanced students to quickly move through their studies and graduate early. During this period the alumni association became active, donating funds for the building of an on-campus chapel. Other buildings housing classrooms, including Davis Hall, were also built around this time. Bruce G. Carter took over administrative duties as president in 1972. Under his direction, the college advanced a system of night classes for local adult learners. New scholarships for freshmen were also made available. Soon after Carter took office, the legislature moved to rename all public institutions of higher education in the state under a new system: two-year institutions would be known as "colleges" and four-year institutions would be known as "universities". This led directly to OCLA's new and current name: the University of Science and Arts of Oklahoma.

Over the next several years, several construction projects were completed, including renovations to Gary, Austin, and Davis Halls and Nash Library. Serious construction continued throughout the 1980s and 1990s, culminating in the opening of a newly remodeled $2.2-million Student Center in 1998. Sparks Hall, the traditional dormitory on campus, was also greatly renovated.

In 2000, John Feaver became the institution's twelfth president. In 2001, the National Park Service approved the listing of the entire campus as a national historic district, the only educational institution in the state to hold such an honor. Historic markers throughout the campus document describe the various historic buildings. New housing options were made available in the early 2000s in the form of the $13.1-million Lawson Court Apartment Complex. Owens Flag Plaza, a centerpiece for the campus 'oval', was opened in 2004. Since 2005, USAO, with the support of the State Regents for Higher Education, has embarked on a Mission Enhancement Plan intended to emphasize the institution's unique role as the public liberal arts college in Oklahoma. As part of the plan, USAO has raised its admission standards so they are the highest in the state of Oklahoma, increased the percentage of full-time students, and created new faculty positions. In Spring 2015, construction of Coming Together Park began in front of Sparks Hall. The park will incorporate about 150,000 lb (68,000 kg) of granite, and artist-in-residence and internationally known granite sculptor Jesús Moroles worked with students to sculpt the granite for the park.

== Campus ==
Fourteen buildings on the USAO campus are listed on the National Register of Historic Places as the Oklahoma College for Women Historic District. The buildings are Trout Hall (formerly known as the Administration building), Nellie Sparks Hall, Willard Hall, the President's Home, the President's Home Garage, Austin Hall, the Health and Physical Education building, Senior Hall, the Home Management House, Robertson Hall, Lawson Hall, Canning Hall, Addams Hall, and Nash Library. Many are Public Works Administration buildings designed by different prominent Oklahoma architects, including Paul Harris, Solomon Andrew Layton, John Duncan Forsyth and J.O. Parr. The Historic District also includes three brick entry gates and the stone bench near Willard Hall donated by the class of 1924, which are designated contributing objects. University property also includes the 145-acre Habitat Area, which is three miles west of the main campus and is used as an outdoor classroom.

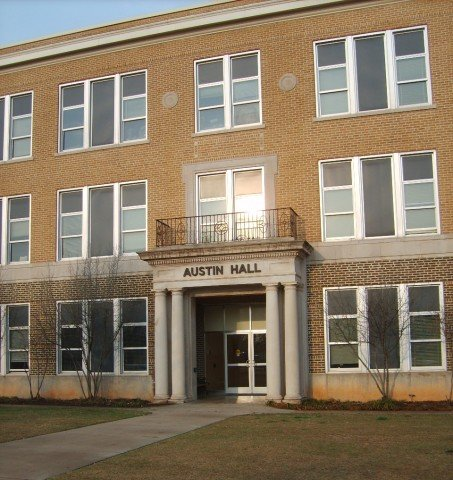
Austin Hall

== Organization and administration ==
USAO is governed by the Board of Regents of the University of Science and Arts of Oklahoma, which is a Statutory Governing Board in the Oklahoma State System of Higher Education. The board of regents was established by the Oklahoma State Legislature in 1919. The Board's seven members serve overlapping seven-year terms. Board members are appointed by the Governor of Oklahoma with the advice and consent of the Oklahoma Senate. Campus administration is led by a president. The current president is John Feaver.

== Academics ==
As the state of Oklahoma's public liberal arts college, USAO's mission is to provide the public with a distinctive and accessible liberal arts and sciences education. The academic program centers on a required 46-hour Interdisciplinary Studies Core Curriculum, which is a prescribed set of courses that encompass history, science, art, mathematics, literature, philosophy, economics, art and theatre. Many of these classes are team-taught by two or more instructors in order to encourage interdisciplinary learning. The Core Curriculum Courses are distributed throughout a student's four years at USAO, culminating in a Senior Seminar class and completion of an interdisciplinary research project. While working through the core curriculum, students simultaneously pursue traditional majors in a variety of subject areas. USAO offers 22 majors and several pre-professional programs. The college is organized into four divisions: Arts and Humanities, Social Sciences and Business, Science and Physical Education, and Education and Speech-Language Pathology.

The college operates on a trimester schedule, which makes it possible for a full-time student to complete a degree in three years or fewer. An additional five-week "independent study" period in late April and May is used for educational trips within the US and internationally, creative projects, and special topics courses.

=== Tuition & financial aid ===
For the 2014–15 School Year, in-state tuition at USAO was $170/credit hour. Full-time students who are enrolled in 12-18 credit hours are charged a flat rate equivalent to 15 credit hours of tuition, which totals $3,135 per semester. The flat-rate tuition plan is intended to encourage students to complete their degrees in four years. Students may also opt for a locked $195/credit hour tuition rate, which is guaranteed to remain the same throughout their next four years of college attendance. Out-of-state tuition is calculated based on the current in-state tuition rate plus an additional $298/credit hour. In the 2013–2014 school year, 85% of USAO students received some form of financial aid. 79% of the Fall 2014 entering freshman class received scholarships from USAO.

=== Academic rankings ===
In 2015, USAO was ranked 65th on Kiplinger's Best Values in Public Colleges list. The American Council of Trustees and Alumni gave USAO an A rating as part of its What Will They Learn? initiative, which rates colleges on an A-F scale based on the comprehensiveness of their core curricula. USAO was the only college or university in Oklahoma and one of only 23 nationwide to receive an A rating.

=== Accreditation ===
The institution has been accredited by the North Central Association of Colleges and Schools and its successor, the Higher Learning Commission, since 1920. Its education programs are accredited by the National Council for Accreditation of Teacher Education and the Oklahoma State Department of Education. The Deaf Education program is accredited by the Council on Education of the Deaf. The music department is accredited by the National Association of Schools of Music.

=== Professional memberships ===
The institution is a member of several organizations of colleges and universities. These include the American Council on Education, the American Association of State Colleges and Universities, the Association of American Colleges and Universities, the American Association of Colleges for Teacher Education, the American Association of Governing Boards, and the Council of Public Liberal Arts Colleges.

== Student life ==
Undergraduate demographics as of Fall 2023
Race and ethnicity	Total
White	63%
Two or more races	11%
International student	7%
American Indian/Alaska Native	5%
Black	4%
Hispanic	4%
Unknown	4%
Asian	1%
Economic diversity
Low-income (Note: The percentage of students who received an income-based federal Pell grant intended for low-income students.)	47%
Affluent (Note: The percentage of students who are a part of the American middle class at the bare minimum.)	53%

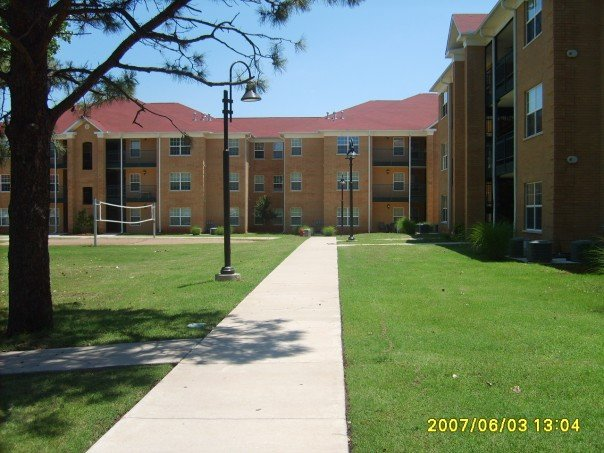
Lawson Court apartments at USAO, which are one of the on-campus housing options

The majority of students live on campus in one of USAO's three housing options: Sparks Hall dormitories, Lawson Court Apartments, or the historic Robertson Hall.

Students participate in roughly thirty organizations, including political advocacy, religious, academic, and special interest groups. They are also served by the college's century-old newspaper The Trend. There are several academic honor groups on campus. There are multiple music ensembles at USAO, including concert band, jazz band, smaller instrumental ensembles, concert choir, and jazz choir, which are open to majors and non-majors. The institution has one fraternity, Phi Lambda Chi, and two sororities, Zeta Zeta Zeta and Sigma Psi Omega; as of 2024, approximately 1% of men and 4% of women participated in Greek life. The Student Government and Student Activities Board plan events for all students and guests throughout the year.

The Spring Triad is a major campus event held annually on the first Thursday in April. It includes the Montmartre Chalk Art Festival, the Droverstock music festival, and the Scholastic Meet. The Montmartre Chalk Art Festival, named for the Montmartre arts district in Paris, is held around the USAO Oval, and over 700 artists, including elementary, high school, and college students and community members, take part in the competition. Droverstock is a day-long festival of live music from bands of all styles and genres. There are also many vendors, inflatables, and activities associated with the festival. The Scholastic Meet is an academic competition for high school students; around 1000 students compete every year in a wide range of academic disciplines, which include languages and literature, math, science, social sciences, art, theater, and music.

== Athletics ==
The USAO athletic teams are called the Drovers; this refers to the history of cattle-driving through Chickasha. USAO's intercollegiate athletics program began in the 1973–74 academic year. The institution is a member of the National Association of Intercollegiate Athletics (NAIA), primarily competing in the Sooner Athletic Conference (SAC) since the 2000–01 academic year; which they were a member on a previous stint from 1978–79 to 1993–94. The Drovers previously competed in the Red River Athletic Conference (RRAC) from 1998–99 to 1999–2000; as an NAIA Independent during the 1997–98 school year; in the Oklahoma Intercollegiate Conference (OIC) from 1994–95 to 1996–97; and in the Texoma Athletic Conference from 1973–74 to 1977–78.

USAO competes in 13 intercollegiate varsity sports: Men's sports include baseball, basketball, cross country, golf, soccer and track & field; while women's sports include basketball, cross country, golf, soccer, softball, track & field and volleyball. The university announced in December 2015 that it would add women's volleyball in the Fall 2016 trimester.

=== Accomplishments ===
- The men's basketball team has won the SAA Conference Title four times, appeared in the National Tournament five times, and won the National Championship in 2002.
- The Lady Drovers' basketball team played in the NAIA Final Four in 2003.
- The men's soccer program is also strong, with the Drovers having won the SAC Conference Title six times, appeared in the National Tournament twice and made the NAIA National Quarterfinals in 2010.
- The Lady Drovers' soccer team has also been the 2006 Tourney Qualifier.
- Baseball and Softball are both popular sports on campus, with the Lady Drovers' Softball team being National Tourney Qualifiers three years in a row.

== Notable alumni ==
- Te Ata (Mary Thompson) graduated from OCW in 1919, famed Chickasaw storyteller and actress.
- Gladys Anderson Emerson, biochemist, the first person to isolate Vitamin E in a pure form and winner of the 1952 Garvan–Olin Medal for women in chemistry, graduated from OCW in 1925.
- Jerrie Cobb, aviator and member of the Mercury 13, attended OCW in 1948.
- Angelene Collins, soprano and 1950 winner of the Walter W. Naumburg Competition, graduated from Oklahoma College for Women in 1943.
- Robert E. England, political scientist
- Oisin Fagan Irish professional boxer, attended USAO on a soccer scholarship and received a degree in journalism and physical education.
- Betty Pat Gatliff, pioneer in forensic art and forensic facial reconstruction, graduated from OCW in 1951.
- Inola Henry, chair of the resolutions committee of the California Democratic Party, member of the Democratic National Committee, and superdelegate to the 2008 Democratic National Convention graduated from OCW in 1965.
- Lance Henson, Cheyenne poet, graduated from OCLA in 1972.
- Jeane Porter Hester, Professor of Medicine, Chief of Supportive Therapy, and Chief of Leukapheresis at University of Texas MD Anderson Cancer Center and developer of the IBM 2997 blood cell separator, graduated from OCW in 1951.
- Kelly D. Johnston, who served as the 28th Secretary of the United States Senate, graduated from USAO in 1976.
- Carma Leigh, State Librarian of California from 1951 to 1972
- Mary Stone McLendon, Chickasaw educator, storyteller, musician, performer, and humanitarian.
- Harriet Wright O'Leary (1916–1999), American teacher and politician and first woman to serve on the tribal council of the Choctaw Nation of Oklahoma
- Mary Pannbacker, endowed chair of speech-language pathology at LSU Health Sciences Center Shreveport and Fellow of the American Speech-Language-Hearing Association graduated from OCW in 1963.
- Lotsee Patterson, founder of the American Indian Library Association, graduated from OCW in 1959.
- Lee Shaw, American jazz pianist and composer, graduated from OCW in 1949.
- Norma Smallwood was crowned Miss America 1926. She was the first Native American to win the title.
- James Vernon Smith, U.S. Representative from Oklahoma's 6th congressional district and Administrator of the Farmers Home Administration, attended OCLA.
- Hazel Volkart, composer
- Bill Wallace, author of children's books, graduated from OCLA in 1971.

== Notable faculty ==
- Nellie Ellen Shepherd, painter, headed the art department at OWC. Her portrait of Te Ata hangs in the Oklahoma State Capitol.
- Anna Lewis, historian, headed the history department at OWC. Author of Chief Pushmataha, American Patriot: The Story of the Choctaws Struggle for Survival. Her portrait hung in the Oklahoma State Capitol.
- Ruby K. Worner (1900–1955), chemist, taught at OWC from 1925 to 1927

== Sources ==
- Harlow, Rex (1927). George W. Austin: His Life and Work. Oklahoma City, Oklahoma.
- "Miss Wright Is Bride of Texas Man". McAlester News-Capital. McAlester, Oklahoma. April 22, 1941. p. 5 – via Newspapers.com.
- Orr, Milton Lee (1930). The State-Supported Colleges for Women. Nashville, Tennessee: George Peabody College for Teachers.
