= Ayano Ninomiya =

Japanese-American violinist

Ayano Ninomiya is a Japanese-American violinist and a winner of both the Naumburg International Violin Competition and Tibor Varga International Competitions.

== Early life ==
Ninomiya was born in Takamatsu, Japan, and moved to the United States when she was one. She is a graduate of Harvard College, from which she obtained music and French degrees while studying with Michele Auclair and Miriam Fried. She then was awarded the David McCord Prize there as well winning the Harvard-Radcliffe Orchestra Concerto Competition. Later, she obtained a master's degree from the Juilliard School, where she was under the guidance of Robert Mann. She also was mentored by coaches Michele Auclair, Miriam Fried, Hyo Kang, András Keller, Robert Levin, and Marylou Speaker Churchill.

== Performances ==
She has performed with such quartets as Daedalus, Formosa, and the Momenta in both Singapore and China, across Europe, and throughout the United States, and was a member of the TinAlley String Quartet of Australia. She also was a frequent music festival participant and appeared in such events as the Bridgehampton, the Caramoor, the Olympic, and many others. She also played violin at the National Gallery of Art and Lincoln Center and performed at places as diverse as Bethlehem, Boston, Columbia, Denton, Philadelphia, the US Capitol, and Tokyo's university, where she talked on TEDx in 2012. In 2010, she became first violinist of the Ying Quartet and Associate Professor at the Eastman School of Music. She has recorded three CDs with the Ying Quartet. When not performing, Ayano Ninomiya is a Kokikai practitioner and plays a 2010 violin by living maker Mario Miralles.

== Awards ==
She placed second in the Violin Competition of 2003 sponsored by the Walter W. Naumburg Foundation.
