= William Doppmann =

William Doppmann (Springfield, Massachusetts, October 10, 1934 — Honokaa, Hawaii, January 27, 2013) was an American concert pianist and composer. At the University of Michigan he was the only musician to ever win both the Walter W. Naumburg Award and the Michaels Memorial Award in a single season. As a composer, Doppmann was the recipient of two Guggenheim Fellowships.

== Early life ==
William Doppmann started his piano lessons at the age of 5. His first major show was when he was 10 years old, in which he performed with the Cincinnati Orchestra. He studied piano with Robert Goldsand at the University of Cincinnati College - Conservatory of Music. By the time he entered college he had been in over 500 performances. Doppmann moved to Michigan and attended University of Michigan studying composition with Homer Kelly and Ross Lee Finney, and later studied with Carl Hugo Grimm at the University of Cincinnati College - Conservatory of Music. During his second year in college, Doppmann won his first awards, the Walter W. Naumburg Award and the Michaels Memorial Award as a young artist.

== Career ==
William Doppmann moved to New York City after college, where he spent time studying and performing for symphonies like Marlboro Music Festival. Doppmann was then inducted into the Army and stationed in France and Germany for 2 years. Returning from the Army, Doppmann took care of his children and his wife. He became a professor in three major universities in Washington state, and was a composer for the next 12 years. In 1985 he moved back to New York to continue his career a pianist/composer. He then performed recitals in the United States, Canada, Mexico, Europe, and South America. He served as artistic director of the Port Townsend Chamber Music Society in Washington for 20 years. He was married to Willa Doppmann, who was a Director of the Second City Chamber Series.

== Selected works ==
- Spring Songs for Mezzo Soprano, Piano, Clarinet, Percussion (1981)
- Fantasy I Winter Dreams for Solo Piano (1995)
- Fantasy II Thaw: Shards To The Sea for Solo Piano (1997)
- Four Pieces for solo cello (1951)
- Four American Sonatas for piano (1999)
- Dance Suite for cello, timpani, flute & clarinet (1953)
- Rhapsody for cello, piano & tape on themes of George Crumb & Béla Bartók (1977)
- Evensong for solo violin (1963)
- Five Studies for solo piano (1969)
- Dance Variations for solo clarinet (1978)
- Rikki-Tikki-Tavi for Narrator and Chamber Orchestra (1981)
- Distances . . . for solo piano and off-stage piano or tape (1982)
- Duo for Flute and Harp (1982)
- Counterpoints for Solo Piano, Chamber Strings and Percussion (1987)
- Four Short Pieces for Solo Piano (1988)
- The Marriage Ring for Baritone, Oboe/English Horn and Piano (1989)
- Octobersong for Mezzo Soprano, Piano and Percussion (1995, revised 2006)
- Toccata In Nomine for Solo Piano (1997)
- Two Movements for Solo Viola (1996)
- Passacaille for Harp, Alto Flute/Piccolo, & Mezzo Soprano (1996)
- Psalm 66 for Choir SATB and Brass Trio (1996)
- Partita for Solo Fortepiano (1997)
- Elegy for Solo Cello (1997)
- Mirror Song for Soprano & Mezzo with Piano accompaniment (1998)
- Fantasy III Bells of MidSummer for Solo Piano (1999)
- Justice Variants I & II for solo piano (1997 – 2000)
- Duo In D, La Ricordanza for violin and piano (1999)
- For Herself for High Soprano and Piano (2000)
- Seven Duets for two Solo Violins (2001)
- Swordplay for full orchestra and concertante of soloists – piano, clarinet, cornet (2003).
