= Paul Olefsky =

Paul Olefsky (January 4, 1926 – June 1, 2013) was an American cellist.

Olefsky was born in Chicago. He earned a bachelor's degree from the Curtis Institute of Music, where he studied with Gregor Piatigorsky. Olefsky subsequently studied with Pablo Casals. He studied conducting with Herbert von Karajan and Pierre Monteux.

During the 1940s, Olefsky performed as the principal cellist of the Philadelphia Orchestra while maintaining a worldwide career as a solo artist. In 1948 he was a winner of the Naumburg Competition in New York City. In 1950, he performed the world premiere of the Cello Concerto by Virgil Thomson.

Olefsky left his position in Philadelphia in 1950 to join the United States Navy. In 1953, during his Navy service, he won the Michaels Memorial Award competition in Chicago.

Upon completing his military service, Olefsky became the principal cellist of the Detroit Symphony Orchestra. In 1964, he was a soloist with the Naumburg Orchestral Concerts, in the Naumburg Bandshell, Central Park (NY), summer series.

In 1974, he took a position as professor of cello at the University of Texas at Austin, where he taught for several decades and was a professor emeritus at the time of his death.

Olefsky was married and had a daughter and a son. He died in Austin, Texas, at the age of 87.
