= Philadelphia String Quartet =

- Origin: Philadelphia, Pennsylvania, United States
- Genres: Classical
- Years active: 1960 - 1992

The Philadelphia String Quartet was an American string quartet founded in Philadelphia, Pennsylvania, in 1959-60 by four members of the Philadelphia Orchestra. They later broke off from the orchestra and accepted a residency at the University of Washington.

== History ==
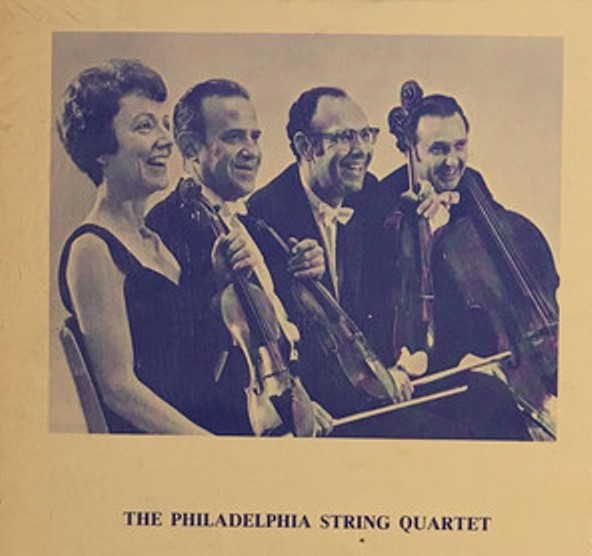
Veda Reynolds, Irv Eisenberg, Alan Iglitzin, Charlie Brennand

The founding members of the Philadelphia String Quartet were all members of the Philadelphia Orchestra under the baton of Eugene Ormandy. They included Veda Reynolds (first violin), Irwin Eisenberg (second violin), Alan Iglitzin (viola), and Charles Brennand (cello). In 1961, the ensemble was appointed quartet in residence at the University of Pennsylvania. The original quartet made their New York City debut at Carnegie Hall during the 1963-64 season.

The foursome resigned from the orchestra to become quartet-in-residence at the University of Washington (UW) in 1966. The move angered the Philadelphia Orchestra's management, which sued UW to prevent the quartet's departure, claiming a contract violation. The players eventually won the right to leave the orchestra.

In 1966, the quartet moved to Seattle to become UW's quartet-in-residence, a position they held until 1982. A fiscal crisis at the university ended their 17-yearlong contract.

In 1968, the US State Department invited the quartet to become the first American string quartet to perform in India. The two-month tour covered the entire country, with concerts played to great acclaim in 14 cities. The Philadelphia String Quartet - Veda Reynolds and Irwin Eisenberg, violins / Albert Iglitzin, viola / Charles Brennand, cello (2 concerts)

During their 30-year tenure, the quartet repeatedly toured the world and recorded an extensive chamber music repertoire. From 1976-77, the quartet played the entire cycle of quartets by Ludwig van Beethoven, including the Quartet No. 3 in D Major, Quartet No. 9 in C Major, Quartet No. 16 in F Major, and the Grosse Fugue.

They championed new music and had a close musical relationship with the American composer George Rochberg. They commissioned and premiered his 2nd quartet. They had a close relationship with Argentine composer Alberto Ginastera. The Philadelphia String Quartet worked with Ginastera extensively before they performed the world premiere of his revised 2nd quartet.

The founding quartet earned the Washington Governor's Arts Award. A quartet of their UW students won the Coleman Chamber Music competition prize. Their residency included relationships with Washington State University, Eastern Washington University and Central Washington University where the quartet held open rehearsals and performed with faculty members. Their LPs included works from Haydn, Mozart, Beethoven, Mendelssohn, Bergsma, Becerra, Chihara, and other living composers.

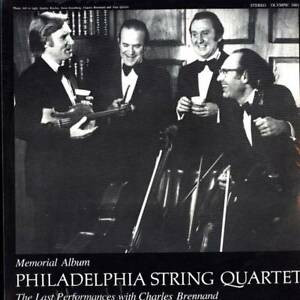
PSQ with Stanley, Irv, Charlie and Alan

Reynolds departure in 1975 marked the end of the quartet's original members. Violinist Stanley Ritchie filled the opening. Brennand died in 1976, replaced by cellist Carter Enyeart. They performed the Beethoven cycle at Meany Hall at UW and continued to tour internationally.

From 1983-1987 the quartet consisted of members Karen Iglitzin (1st violinist and Iglitzin's daughter), Eisenberg, Alan Iglitzin, and Roger Lebow, followed by Alexander Segal. They performed across the US, including many university and community residencies. The quartet also toured Brazil, Columbia, and Chile in 1983 and India in 1985.

In 1984, Alan Iglitzin founded Concerts-in-the-Barn at the Olympic Music Festival. It was awarded Best Classical Music Festival by readers of Seattle Weekly. Karen Iglitzin founded the Chamber Music Institute in 1984, which operated in the summer on the farm. Many teenagers came to live and study quartets with the Philadelphia String Quartet. Alumni included many who became professional players. The Olympic Music Festival name passed to another organization, but the original barn series continued.

The name of the quartet was revived by violist Radhames Santos.

== Members ==
=== 1st violinists ===
- Veda Reynolds (co-founder, 1922-2000), 1960-1975
- Stanley Ritchie, 1975-1981
- Peter Marsh, 1982-1983
- Karen Iglitzin, 1983-1987
- Stefan Hersh, 1988-1992

=== 2nd violinists ===
- Irwin Eisenberg (co-founder, 1919-2014), 1960-2000
- Roberta Hersh, 1988-1992

=== Violist ===
- Alan Iglitzin (co-founder, 1931-2025), 1960-2000

=== Cellists ===
- Charles Brennand (co-founder, 1929-1976), 1960-1976
- Carter Enyeart, 1976-1982
- Roger Lebow, 1982-1984
- Alexander Segal, 1985-1987
- Jennifer Culp, 1988-1992
