= Georg Faust =

German cellist

Georg Faust (born 9 July 1956) is a German cellist, he was the principal cellist of the Berlin Philharmonic from 1985 to 2012.

== Early life and education ==
Faust was born in the village of Porz near Cologne. He started playing the cello at age 7. His first teacher was Otto Weidermann, a cellist of the Gürzenich Orchestra Cologne. In 1977, at the age of 14, Faust was accepted as a student of Siegfried Palm at the Cologne Conservatory of Music, where he made his Master's degree with distinction. Supported by a scholarship by the German Academic Exchange Service he went to the Manhattan School of Music in New York to study with Bernard Greenhouse in 1978/79.

== Career ==
As a guest of Rudolf Serkin he was a participant of the Marlboro Music School and Festival from 1979 to 1981. In 1980 he became the principal cellist of the Hamburg State Opera, and in 1983 principal cellist of the NDR Symphony Orchestra. In 1985 Herbert von Karajan and the Berlin Philharmonic engaged him as principal cellist. Faust was teacher at the Karajan Academy from 1986 until 2007. He gave masterclasses in Germany, Australia and Japan

As a soloist he has appeared with Claudio Abbado, Daniel Barenboim, Bernard Haitink und Simon Rattle As the artistic leader of the 12 Cellists of the Berlin Philharmonic he created many prizewinning CDs between 1990 and 2012. He was a founding member of Ensemble Wien-Berlin Nonett, the Schönberg-Trio and the Berliner Barock Solisten. He appeared in chamber music concerts and recordings with artists as Leif Ove Andsnes, Emanuel Ax, Yefim Bronfman, Sarah Chang, James Levine, Alexander Lonquich, Albrecht Mayer, Emmanuel Pahud, Maurizio Pollini, Mitsuko Uchida and others.

Having left the Berlin Philharmonic in 2012 he has involved himself intensively with exploring a new string instrument, called "campanula", which features up to additional 16 resonating strings. To support and promote the campanula he founded a non-profit association, Campanula Musica, which gives scholarships to gifted young classical musician. Faust also encourages and promotes creative improvisation and free play for classical music students to strengthen the creative part in classical music education.

== Awards ==
- International Competition of the Walter W. Naumburg Foundation New York 1977
- ARD International Music Competition Munich 1977
- International Tchaikovsky Competition Moscow 1982

== Selected discography ==
- Antonín Dvořák: String Sextet, Op. 48; Pyotr Ilyich Tchaikovsky: Souvenir de Florence, Op. 70, with Sarah Chang, Alexander Kerr, Wolfram Christ, Tanja Schneider, Olaf Maninger (2002, EMI)
- Franz Schubert: Trout Quintet D 667, with James Levine (piano) and Gerhart Hetzel, Wolfram Christ, Alois Posch (1993, Deutsche Grammophon Gesellschaft)
- South American Getaway with The 12 Cellists of the Berlin Philharmonic (2000, EMI)
- Round Midnight with The 12 Cellists of the Berlin Philharmonic (2002, EMI)
- As Time Goes By with The 12 Cellists of the Berlin Philharmonic (2004, EMI)
- Angel Dances with The 12 Cellists of the Berlin Philharmonic (2006, EMI)
- Joseph Haydn: Sinfonia Concertante for violin solo, cello solo, oboe solo, bassoon solo and orchestra with the Berlin Philharmonic, Simon Rattle (2007, EMI)
