= Angelene Collins Rasmussen =

American singer

Angelene Collins Rasmussen (died June 29, 2005) was an American soprano. In 1950, she was a winner of the Walter W. Naumburg Competition.

== Early life ==
She was born Angelene Collins in Dallas, Texas, but spent most of her childhood in Oklahoma. After studying viola throughout her childhood, she began taking voice lessons as a high school senior. She received a scholarship to study music at Oklahoma College for Women, where she graduated with a Bachelor of Music in Voice in 1943. She then received a fellowship to study at the Juilliard School of Music with Francis Rogers, and she graduated with a Masters of Music degree. She was represented by the National Music League, which booked her in recitals and concert appearances around the United States. In 1950, she won the Walter W. Naumburg competition; she was the first vocalist in five years to receive the award. She then toured as an assisting artist with Lauritz Melchior. She sang in the premiere performance of Lois Albright's opera, Hopitu (Hopi people), based on Hopi chants, which premiered February 16, 1955 at Carnegie Hall. In later life, she was a judge for Metropolitan Opera auditions.

== Personal life ==
On May 25, 1958, she married Lawrence Rasmussen, head of the music department at Adelphi University. Their son, Lauritz John Albert, was born in 1964.
