= Sadah Shuchari =

American violinist (1906–2001)

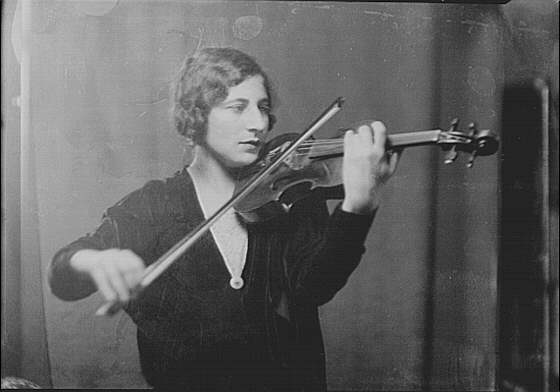
- Sadah Shuchari photographed in 1928 by Arnold Genthe; from the Library of Congress
- Born: Sadah R. Schwartz; December 11, 1906; Enfield, Connecticut, US
- Died: May 20, 2001 (aged 94); St Albans, Vermont, US
- Other names: Sadah Schuhari, Sadah S. Start, Sadah S. Colodny
- Occupation: Violinist

Sadah Shuchari (December 11, 1906 – 20 May 2001), or Sadah Schuhari, in Russian Сада Шухари, was an American violinist and music educator. She was concertmaster of the Vermont Philharmonic Orchestra from 1964 to 1979.

== Early life ==
Sadah Shuchari was born Sadah "Sadie" Schwartz in Enfield, Connecticut, the daughter of Charles Schwartz and Dora Gerber Schwartz. Her parents were Jewish immigrants from Romania; her father sold insurance.

Shuchari attended the Juilliard School, and studied violin with Leopold Auer and Paul Kochanski. She also studied with composer Rubin Goldmark, George Enescu, and Felix Salmond.

Later in life, she earned a bachelor's degree from the University of Vermont in 1962, and a master's degree from Teachers College, Columbia University in 1964.

== Career ==
Shuchari won the Naumburg Scholarship in 1927, and the Schubert Memorial Prize in 1928. She performed at New York's Town Hall venue with pianist Isabelle Yalkovsky Byman, in a concert for the Franz Schubert centenary in 1928. She played again with Yalkovsky at Juilliard in 1931.

Shuchari made recordings for Victor in 1928 and 1934. She performed on radio programs.

She appeared as a soloist in recitals and with symphonies in New York, Boston, Philadelphia, San Francisco, Los Angeles, Hartford, Toronto, Baltimore, Harrisburg, Fort Worth, and El Paso in the 1930s. She joined the faculty of Vermont Junior College in 1945, as a professor of music. She continued performing in Vermont into her later years, and was concertmaster of the Vermont Philharmonic Orchestra from 1964 to 1979. Her last public performance came in 1983, at the Vermont Philharmonic's 25th anniversary concert.

== Personal life ==
Shuchari married insurance agent Wallace Parker Start in 1937. They had two children, Frank and Meda, before they divorced in 1954. In 1966 she remarried, to Alex Colodny. Her second husband died in 1985. She died in 2001 in St. Albans Town, Vermont, aged 94 years.
