= Veda Reynolds =

American musician (1922–2000)

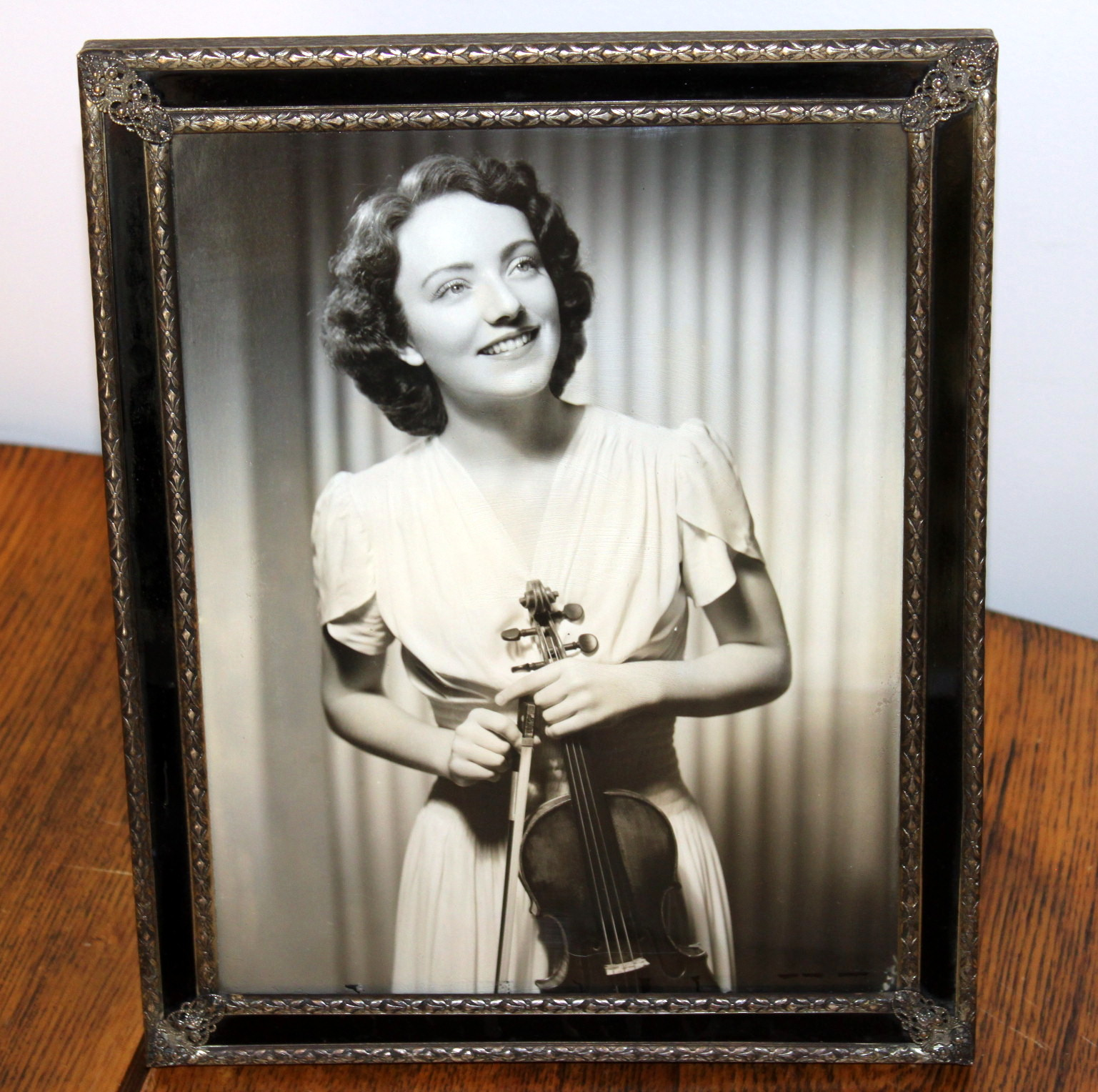
Young Veda Reynolds

Veda Reynolds (1922–2000) was an American violinist, string quartet player, and teacher.

== Early life and training ==
Veda Reynolds was born in Fort Collins, Colorado in 1922. Her father, James Leroy Reynolds, was concertmaster of the Denver Symphony Orchestra. Veda received her training at the Brussels Conservatory, then with Ivan Galamian in Paris. Subsequently she studied in London with Carl Flesch. In 1938 she was accepted as a student to the Curtis Institute of Music where her teacher was Efrem Zimbalist. Graduating in 1942, she joined the faculty of Curtis in May 1943 and taught until 1961) .

A photo from the Curtis Institute has further details.

== Professional career ==
She became a member of the Philadelphia Orchestra, the first woman to join the first violin section. There she stayed from 1943 to 1967, serving as assistant concertmaster for the 1958–1959 season. Reynolds also was a co-founder of the Philadelphia String Quartet with three other members of the orchestra. Veda was the first violinist, Irwin Eisenberg, second violin; Alan Iglitzin, viola, and Charles Brennand, cello. The group cut ties with the orchestra in 1966 under significant resistance from its administration. Moving to Seattle, they became the quartet-in-residence of the University of Washington. From their base in Seattle, they made tours to South America, India and to Europe. The original quartet stayed together for seventeen years.

After that period, Reynolds taught at the North Carolina School of the Arts (1975–1977). Veda then moved to France to join the faculty of the Conservatoire National Supérieur de Musique de Lyon. Her students included David Harrington, Karen Iglitzin, Joseph Silverstein, Arnold Steinhardt, Michael Tree, and William de Pasquale.

She was a respected teacher, and several articles have examined her pedagogy.

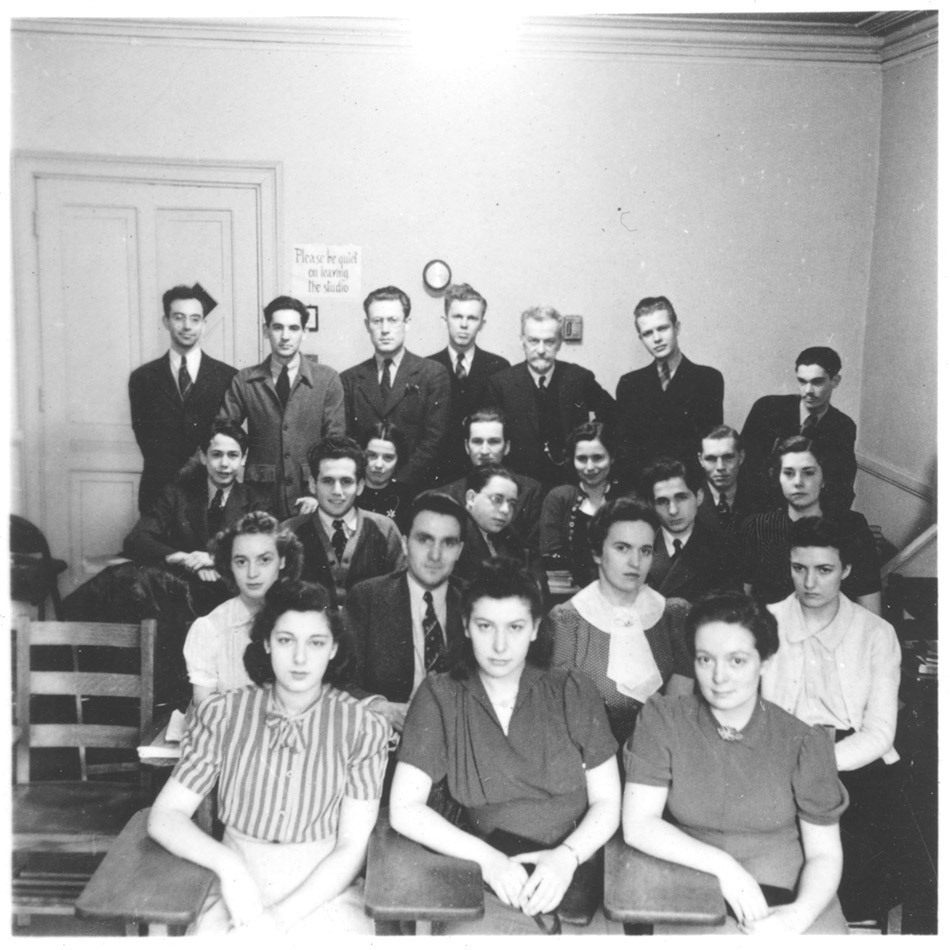
Curtis Institute circa 1939-41, Veda Reynolds as a student, front row, far left
