= Ying Quartet =

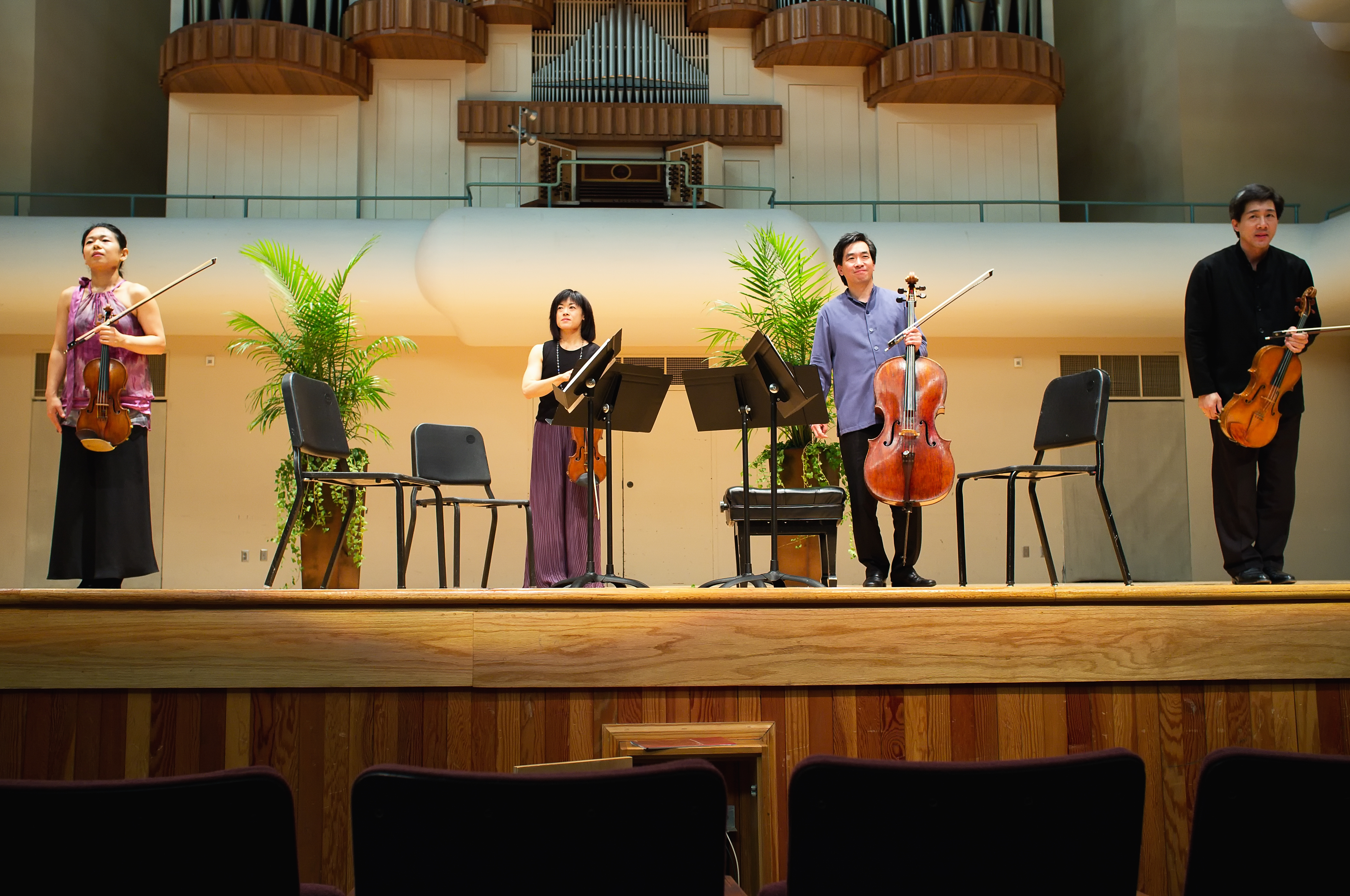
- The Ying Quartet performing at the University of Alabama in 2011. From left to right: Ayano Ninomiya, Janet Ying, David Ying, Phillip Ying

Background information
- Origin: Rochester, NY, United States
- Genre: Classical
- Years active: 1988–present
- Labels: Telarc; Sono Luminus
- Members: Robin Scott (Violin); Janet Ying (Violin); Phillip Ying (Viola); David Ying (Cello)
- Past members: Timothy Ying (Violin); Frank Huang (Violin); Ayano Ninomiya (Violin)
- Website: www.ying4.com

The Ying Quartet is an American string quartet. The Ying siblings, from Winnetka, Illinois, formed the quartet in 1988 while studying at the University of Rochester's Eastman School of Music. The quartet began performing in the small town of Jesup, Iowa, as the first artists involved in the National Endowment for the Arts Chamber Music Rural Residencies Program. The original members of the quartet were Timothy and Janet Ying (violins), Phillip Ying (viola), and David Ying (cello). In April 2009, Timothy Ying announced his departure from the ensemble. In 2009, Frank Huang became the first violinist of the Ying Quartet. When Huang left the quartet in 2010 to assume the position of concertmaster of the Houston Symphony, Ayano Ninomiya was appointed first violinist of the Ying Quartet. Ayano Ninomiya was, in turn, replaced by violinist Robin Scott in 2015.

While the Ying Quartet was in Jesup, it won the 1993 Naumburg Chamber Music Award. In the years since, the Yings have performed in many major American cities; at numerous festivals, including Tanglewood, Aspen, and San Miguel; and in Europe, Canada, Mexico, Australia, Japan, and Taiwan. The Yings have played in diverse settings, including Carnegie Hall, the White House, hospitals, and juvenile prisons. The EMI Classics recording of works by Osvaldo Golijov on which the Ying Quartet appeared with the St. Lawrence Quartet was nominated for a 2003 Grammy Award. The Quartet was nominated once again for a Grammy in 2007 in the "Best Chamber Music Performance" category for a recording of the three Tchaikovsky Quartets and the Sextet on Telarc. The Quartet won a 2005 Grammy for its collaborative recording with the Turtle Island String Quartet, entitled 4+Four, and has recorded for the Telarc, Quartz, Elektra, and Albany record labels.

In 1999 the Quartet introduced a commissioning project supported by the Institute for American Music designed to produce a distinctively American string quartet repertoire. The project has introduced new quartets by Tod Machover, Michael Torke, Kevin Puts, Carter Pann, Roberto Carnevale, Paquito D’Rivera, Chen Yi, Daniel Kellogg, Augusta Read Thomas, Marina Leonardi, Ned Rorem, Jennifer Higdon, and Bernard Rands. With Musical Dim Sum, the Yings have extended their repertoire while celebrating their own cultural heritage by including a selection of short works by Chinese American composers in the framework of a traditional concert.

The Ying Quartet teaches actively. It is the quartet-in-residence at the Eastman School of Music of the University of Rochester and frequently teaches at the Bowdoin International Music Festival in Brunswick, Maine, and at the Aspen Music Festival.
