= Inola Henry =

American politician and educator (1942–2009)

- Born: November 15, 1942; Henderson, Texas
- Died: July 26, 2009 (aged 66); Los Angeles, California
- Education: Oklahoma College for Women(B.A., English)
- Occupations: Teacher, Union leader, Democratic party activist
- Political party: Democratic Party

Inola Henry (November 15, 1942 – July 26, 2009) was an educator, union leader, and American Democratic Party leader who was chair of the resolutions committee of the California Democratic Party, Democratic National Committee member, and a Superdelegate to the 2008 Democratic National Convention, where she voted for Barack Obama.

== Early life ==
Henry was born in Henderson, Texas and grew up in Lawton, Oklahoma. She attended college at Oklahoma College for Women, and she graduated with a Bachelor of Arts degree in English in 1965. In Oklahoma, she was involved in the Civil Rights Movement, taking part in sit-ins and working with the Student Nonviolent Coordinating Committee.

== Education career ==
After graduating, Henry moved to California and began her teaching career. She taught at Normandie Avenue Elementary School in Los Angeles and Gardner Street Elementary School in Hollywood. She served on the board of United Teachers Los Angeles and was chair of its political action committee. Beginning in 1990, she was a facilitator for the Student-to-Student Integration Program at Los Angeles Unified School District. She also served on the leadership of the National Education Association helping to draft policy statements.

== Political career ==
Henry first became involved in California civic life as a co-founder of the Watts Summer Festival following the Watts riots. She then became active in the California Democratic Party. Henry served as Lead Chair of the California Democratic Party Resolutions Committee. She was elected to the Midterm National Convention in 1978 and to the Democratic National Committee in 2000, 2004, and 2008. On the Democratic National Committee, she chaired a committee drafting statements of party principles. In 2008, she was a superdelegate from California to the 2008 Democratic National Convention, where she voted for Barack Obama. In 2009, she was honored as California's 48th State Assembly district Woman of the Year.

== Death ==
Henry died of a heart attack on July 26, 2009, at her home in Los Angeles.
