= Irwin Eisenberg =

American violinist and violin teacher

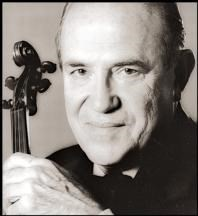
Irwin Eisenberg, violinist

Irwin Eisenberg (1919–July 3, 2014) was an American violinist and string quartet player. He was a member of the Philadelphia String Quartet.

== Life and career ==
Eisenberg was a member of the St. Louis Symphony, and founded the St. Louis String Quartet. After several seasons with the symphony, Eisenberg joined the Philadelphia Orchestra. (See Box 183, Folder 38) There, he served as the assistant principal second violinist. Eastman School of Music lists him as an alumnus who was in the Philadelphia Orchestra. Eisenberg was part of the String Art Quartet.

In 1960, he co-founded the Philadelphia String Quartet, with whom he was the second violinist. The other members were Veda Reynolds, first violinist; Alan Iglitzin, violist and Charles Brennand, cellist. While the members were still playing with the Philadelphia Orchestra, they worked as a quartet, culminating in a six-concert Carnegie Hall debut.

In 1966, Irv, as he was known to colleagues, and the quartet departed the Philadelphia Orchestra. They became quartet-in-residence at the University of Washington in Seattle. Time Magazine published an article on their departure on Oct.7, 1966 Over their 17-year residency, the quartet performed extensively at the University of Washington.

They made tours of South America, Europe and the United States. In 1968, the US State Department invited the Philadelphia String Quartet to become the first American string quartet to perform in India. Eisenberg was a champion of living composers and the quartet performed many new works and premiers. Irv and the quartet also performed as part of the UW Contemporary Group which played all new music. With the Philadelphia String Quartet, he recorded music of American composers, including George Rochberg and Paul Chihara.

He also performed as a substitute player with the Seattle Symphony and as a member of the Pacific Northwest Ballet Orchestra.

Irv commissioned new works, including a solo violin piece by long-time colleague at the University of Washington music department, composer Robert Suderberg. He also performed as a guest violinist with other ensembles.

== Teaching career ==
Eisenberg taught private violin pupils since 1938. In 2004, he was named "Teacher of the Year" by the Washington division of the American String Teacher .

== Early life and personal life ==
Born in St. Louis, Missouri, Irwin began his violin studies with Scipione Guidi, who was concertmaster of the St. Louis Symphony. Eisenberg attended the Eastman School of Music where he studied with Gustave Tinlot. Subsequently Eisenberg went to New York to study with Raphael Bronstein.

Eisenberg was married to Shilah Portnoy, with whom he had two sons. In 1986, Irv married the artist Teresa Malinowski. Irv's sons are David of San Francisco, and Don. who works with his holiness, the Dalai Lama, in Dharamsala, India. When the Dalai Lama came to visit Seattle, Irv and family hosted him at the Eisenberg home.
