= Frank Huang =

- Born: September 5, 1978 (age 47); Beijing, China
- Genres: Classical
- Occupations: concertmaster, professor
- Instrument: Violin

Frank Xin Huang (born September 5, 1978) is a Chinese-born American violinist and teacher. Since 2015 he has been the concertmaster of the New York Philharmonic. Previous to his position in New York, Huang was the first violinist of the Ying Quartet and a professor of violin and chamber music at the Eastman School of Music, then served as the concertmaster of the Houston Symphony from 2010 to 2015. He has won several international music competitions, most notably the 2003 Naumburg Competition. Huang has concertized widely as a soloist, and his debut recording on Naxos was critically acclaimed.

== Early life and musical training ==
Frank Huang was born in Beijing and moved to the United States when he was two, living with his grandparents until age seven, when his parents joined him in the U.S. As a child in the Houston area, he began violin lessons with his mother then commenced study with Fredell Lack in Houston. He first soloed with orchestra at nine. At 10 he received eight curtain calls for his solo performance of Wieniawski's Scherzo Tarantelle with the Houston Youth Symphony Philharmonia Orchestra. At 11 Huang was a soloist with the Houston Symphony in a nationally broadcast performance. At 16 he enrolled in the pre-college program at the Cleveland Institute of Music, where he studied with Donald Weilerstein; he continued studies with Weilerstein in college and earned his Bachelor of Music degree from CIM in 2002. Subsequently, he attended the Juilliard School in New York City, studying violin briefly with Robert Mann.

== Career ==
As a winner of several international music competitions (see "Awards and distinctions" below), Frank Huang is much in demand as a soloist, both in recital and with orchestra, and as a chamber musician. Huang performed his New York debut recital at Alice Tully Hall in 2004 to high acclaim (see "Reviews and commentary," below). He has performed as a soloist with the Amadeus Chamber Orchestra, the Cleveland Orchestra, the Genoa Orchestra, the Houston Symphony Orchestra, the Indianapolis Symphony Orchestra, the NDR-Radio Philharmonic Orchestra of Hanover, and others. Huang has appeared on American Morning (CNN), Good Morning America (ABC), and Performance Today (National Public Radio). He has performed at many of the most prestigious music festivals in the U.S., including the Caramoor Festival, the Marlboro Music Festival, and Ravinia, and has participated in The Chamber Music Society of Lincoln Center's CMS II program.

== Awards and distinctions ==
- 3rd prize, 1999 Ima Hogg National Young Artist Competition, Houston, Texas, USA
- 2nd prize, 1999 Premio Paganini International Violin Competition, Genoa, Italy
- 1st prize, Kingsville International Competition, Kingsville, Texas, USA
- 1st prize, 1999 Irving M. Klein International String Competition, San Francisco, California, USA
- 1st prize, 2000 D’Angelo International Competition, Erie, Pennsylvania, USA
- 1st prize, 2000 International Joseph Joachim Violin Competition, Hanover, Germany
- 4th place laureate, 2002 International Violin Competition of Indianapolis, Indiana, USA
- 1st prize, 2003 Naumburg International Violin Competition, New York City, New York, USA

In 2017, Huang was named a recipient of the Lincoln Center Emerging Artist's Award.

== Reviews and commentary ==
- "Huang made everything he played seem easy. . . . In the end, what impressed most was Huang’s total grasp of each musical idiom he addressed and his ability to communicate such a variety of styles with force and immediacy. A debut recital of this quality used to be an automatic passport to a major career." —"Sweet Sounds" by Peter J. Davis in New York magazine, 2 February 2004
- "One had a right to expect technical competence. . . . But Huang had much more than that on offer. He is a sensational musician. . . . a musician of elegance and impeccable taste. . . . There were simply no flaws." —"Fine Fiddling" by Heuwell Tircuit at SFCV.org (San Francisco Classical Voice), 1 December 2003
- "[An] important artist." —San Francisco Chronicle

== Discography ==
Violin Recital. With Dina Vainstein, piano. "Fantasies" by Schubert, Ernst, Schoenberg, and Franz Waxman. Naxos Records 8.557121 (recorded 2002; released 2003).

== Sources ==
- Cleveland Institute of Music Notes March/April/May 2004
- Huang's biography at Hannover International Violin Competition website
- Huang's biography at Naxos website
- Irving M. Klein International String Competition website
- "Local violinist honored" by Charles Ward. Houston Chronicle, 27 June 2003.
- "Youth Symphony offers peek at musical future" by Betty Ewing. Houston Chronicle, 24 May 1989.
