= Andrés Díaz (cellist) =

Andrés Díaz (born 1964) is a Chilean cellist, who performs with the Díaz Trio, which includes his brother Roberto Díaz, a violist, and violinist Andrés Cárdenes, former concertmaster of the Pittsburgh Symphony Orchestra. He won the First Prize in the 1986 Naumburg International Cello Competition.

== Career ==
Díaz's orchestral appearances include engagements with the Atlanta Symphony, performances with the American Symphony at Carnegie Hall, the symphony orchestras of Milwaukee, Seattle, Rochester, the Boston Pops and Esplanade Orchestras, the Chicago Symphony at the Ravinia Festival and the National Symphony Orchestra. He has toured Taiwan, Hong Kong, Korea, Japan, Hawaii and Canada, and appeared in Chile, Venezuela, Argentina, and the Dominican Republic.

He has also appeared with Russia's Saratov Symphony and toured in New Zealand with the New Zealand Chamber Orchestra. He is currently a professor at Southern Methodist University.

In 2002, he was a soloist with the Naumburg Orchestral Concerts, in the Naumburg Bandshell, Central Park (NY), summer series.

== Personal life ==
Diaz is married to Julie Diaz and has two sons, Peter and Gabriel. He is the brother of violist Roberto Diaz.
