= Roberto Díaz (violist) =

Chilean-American violist

- Born: Chile
- Genres: classical music
- Occupations: violist, president/director of the Curtis Institute of Music
- Instrument: viola
- Label: Naxos
- Website: Curtis Institute

Roberto Díaz is a Chilean-American violist, and the president/director of the Curtis Institute of Music, of which he is an alumnus.

From 1996 to 2006 he held the position of principal violist of the Philadelphia Orchestra, and has been principal viola of the National Symphony under Mstislav Rostropovich, a member of the Boston Symphony under Seiji Ozawa, and a member of the Minnesota Orchestra under Neville Marriner. He is the violist in the Díaz Trio, which includes cellist Andrés Díaz (his brother) and violinist Andrés Cárdenes, former concertmaster of the Pittsburgh Symphony Orchestra.

Díaz's primary teachers were his father Manuel Díaz, Burton Fine, Louis Krasner, and Joseph de Pasquale. His recording of transcriptions by William Primrose with pianist Robert Koenig was nominated for a 2006 Grammy Award. Díaz has recorded an album of the viola music of Vieuxtemps with Robert Koenig, and the Brahms Sonatas with American pianist Jeremy Denk.

Díaz was born in Chile, and grew up in Atlanta, Georgia. He currently plays on a 1600 Antonio & Girolamo Amati viola once owned by William Primrose, having previously owned a 1743 Carlo Landolfi and a Camillus Camilli from 1739.
