= Texarkana Symphony Orchestra =

Orchestra in Texarkana, Arkansas, U.S.

- Orchestra
- Founded: 2006
- Location: Texarkana, Arkansas, U.S.
- Concert hall: Perot Theatre
- Principal conductor: Philip Mann
- Website: www.texarkanasymphony.org

The Texarkana Symphony Orchestra is a non-profit performing arts initiative in Texarkana, Arkansas, conducted by Philip Mann. Its president is Remica Grey.

The orchestra was originally created as a non-profit organization consisting of 34 musicians and gave its first performance in April 2006 under the direction of Marc-Andre Bougie, but has since expanded to 60 professionals covering a wide range of ages. Most performances are given in the Perot Theatre.

The orchestra has also expanded creating the Texarkana Youth Symphony Orchestra who gave their debut concert in December 2007. The youth orchestra, directed by Steve Bennett, is open to middle and high school students between the ages of 10 and 19.
