= Mary Pannbacker =

Speech-language pathologist and professor

- Died: February 16, 2015; Shreveport, Louisiana
- Education: Oklahoma College for Women, University of Oklahoma, SUNY at Buffalo
- Awards: Fellow of American Speech-Language-Hearing Association Distinguished Service Award from American Cleft Palate - Craniofacial Association
- Scientific career
- Fields: Speech-language pathology
- Workplaces: East Texas State University, Clarion University of Pennsylvania, LSU Health Sciences Center New Orleans, LSU Health Sciences Center Shreveport

Mary Pannbacker (died February 16, 2015) was a speech-language pathologist and university professor. She held an endowed chair, the Albertson's Professor of Speech-Language Pathology, at LSU Health Sciences Center Shreveport. She was a Fellow of the American Speech-Language-Hearing Association.

== Education ==
Pannbacker attended Oklahoma College for Women, graduating in 1963 with a Bachelor of Arts degree. She then earned a Master of Communication Disorders (MCD) from the University of Oklahoma. She received her PhD in Communication Disorders from the State University of New York at Buffalo.

== Medical career ==
Pannbacker held positions at East Texas State University, Clarion University of Pennsylvania, LSU Health Sciences Center New Orleans and LSU Health Sciences Center Shreveport. At LSU Health Sciences Center Shreveport, she held an endowed chair in the Department of Rehabilitation Sciences, the Albertson's Professor of Speech-Language Pathology. She was named a professor emerita of LSU Health Sciences Center Shreveport in 2014.

== Professional Associations & Awards ==
Pannbacker was a Fellow of the American Speech-Language-Hearing Association (ASHA), a reviewer for ASHA journals, and a member of the ASHA's legislative council. At the state level, she was president of the Louisiana Speech-Language-Hearing Association. She received the Distinguished Service Award from the American Cleft Palate - Craniofacial Association.

== Family ==
Pannbacker was survived by three children.
