= Harvey Shapiro (cellist) =

American cellist and teacher (1911–2007)

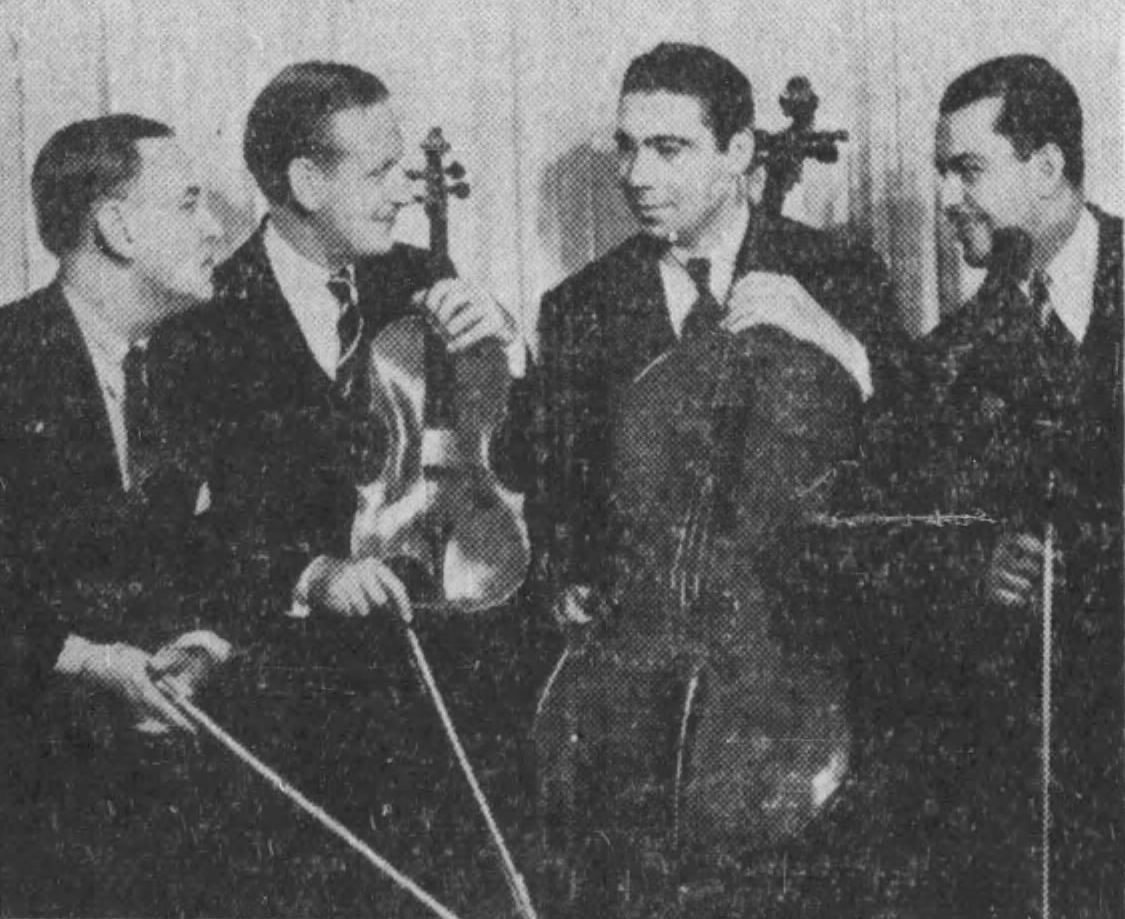
- Shapiro (second from right) with members of the Primrose Quartet, 1943

Background information
- Born: June 22, 1911; New York City, U.S.
- Died: October 25, 2007 (aged 96) New York City, U.S.
- Genre: Classical
- Occupations: Cellist, pedagog
- Instrument: Violoncello

Harvey Shapiro (June 22, 1911 – October 25, 2007) was an American cellist and teacher. His professional debut was in 1935 at New York City's Town Hall. Following this, he was chosen by Arturo Toscanini to play in the cello section of the NBC Symphony Orchestra, whereupon he became its principal in 1943. He was also a founding member of its associated chamber ensembles, the Primrose Quartet and NBC Trio.

After leaving the NBC Symphony in 1946, Shapiro performed prolifically as a studio musician and chamber musician. In 1947, he was a founding member of the WQXR Radio Quartet, which played the international and American premieres of works by various composers until its dissolution in 1963.

From 1970, Shapiro turned his focus to teaching. He taught at the Juilliard School, and gave summer classes and master classes elsewhere in the United States, Canada, and Europe; continuing until 2006. He died in 2007.

== Biography ==
=== Childhood and education ===
Harvey Shapiro was born in New York City to Russian immigrant parents in 1911. He began cello lessons at age 7 with Willem Willeke. Willeke was the director of the South Mountain Music Festival and Walter W. Naumburg Foundation, as well as the president of The Bohemians, a New York music club. He was invited at the age of 8 to study with Julius Klengel in Germany, but was forced to decline on account of his family's lack of financial resources. For a time, economic hardship led Shapiro and his family to move to San Francisco; he later returned to New York City where he settled permanently.

At the age of 9, Shapiro won a scholarship to study at the Institute of Musical Art, the predecessor institution of the Juilliard School. Upon graduation he won the Loeb Prize in 1932, followed by the Naumburg Prize in 1935. He also won the Willem Willeke Scholarship to continue graduate studies at Juilliard, with a fellowship in conducting.

=== Early career ===
Shapiro made his professional debut at Town Hall in New York City on November 11, 1935. His recital partner was pianist Harry Kaufman. While Harold A. Strickland of the Brooklyn Times-Union appraised Shapiro's tone as "not yet agreeable of texture" and criticized his interpretative skills as "limited," Winthrop Sargeant of the Brooklyn Daily Eagle was more positive:

[O]ne was able to perceive that Mr. Shapiro is a talented and thoughtful young musician, not yet capable of interpreting the great works of the repertoire with all the authority of a mature artist, but, nevertheless, showing seriousness of purpose and mechanical resourcefulness that promise well for the future.

=== NBC Symphony and Primrose Quartet ===
In 1937, Shapiro was selected by Arturo Toscanini to join the cello section of the NBC Symphony Orchestra; he was appointed principal cello in 1943 and remained with the ensemble until 1946.

During the late 1930s, Shapiro also played in orchestras at Radio City Music Hall and the New York World's Fair.

In 1939, William Primrose founded the Primrose String Quartet, whose members were all colleagues from the NBC Symphony. Shapiro was one of the quartet's founding members, who were also all neighbors in the same apartment building, playing with them until they split up in 1942. Although they were hailed as one of the great string quartets of their time, the Primrose's discography is small; plans to record an entire cycle of Beethoven's string quartets were canceled by the American entry into World War II.

Shapiro also played in an ensemble called the NBC Trio, with violinist Josef Gingold and pianist Earl Wild.

=== At WQXR ===
From 1947 to 1963 Shapiro performed with the WQXR Radio Quartet; his fellow members were Hugo Fiorato, Harry Glickman (violins), and Jack Braunstein (viola). The quartet played and broadcast the premieres of works by Sergei Rachmaninoff, Darius Milhaud, Peggy Glanville-Hicks, and Carl Stamitz. They also played the American premiere of Anton Bruckner's String Quartet, a performance that was organized in collaboration with the score's publisher, C. F. Peters. The WQXR Radio Quartet also participated in their namesake station's first stereophonic broadcast in 1952.

In 1962, the station disbanded the quartet as a result of lack of sponsorships and its inability to "carry its own weight." The termination was controversial among students at Columbia University, who distributed flyers criticizing the move:

Since Toscanini, [the WQXR Radio Quartet] has been the last bulwark of live, good music on the air. [...] Needless to say, because of the quartet's exceptional performances and superior standards, these weekly broadcasts have become one of the most anticipated listening hours for those who seek the finer performances in the chamber music field.

Students also urged supporters to petition the station and its owner, the New York Times, to rescind the WQXR Radio Quartet's termination.

=== Studio musician ===
Throughout his tenure at WQXR, Shapiro continued to perform as a soloist and studio musician. On July 12, 1954, Shapiro performed a duet with Oscar Shumsky on an episode of The Voice of Firestone which was dedicated to the music and memory of Idabelle Smith Firestone, composer and widow of Harvey S. Firestone. The program was broadcast on ABC. His solos on a 1961 RCA Victor LP with Leopold Stokowski conducting the Symphony of the Air, which was made up of former members of the NBC Symphony Orchestra, earned the cellist praise from the San Francisco Examiner, who called him a "first-rate artist and master of his instrument." Shapiro's playing of the cello solo in a recording of Johannes Brahms' Piano Concerto No. 2 he made with pianist Artur Rubinstein drew congratulations from record engineer John Pfeiffer, as well as his fellow Symphony of the Air musicians.

Shapiro also recorded as soloist with Victor Records, Columbia Records, American Decca Records, and Nonesuch Records.

=== Later career ===
In 1970, at the recommendation of Leonard Rose, Shapiro was appointed professor of cello at the Juilliard School. Originally he was to replace Rose on a temporary basis while the latter was touring with Isaac Stern and Eugene Istomin in a piano trio, but ultimately held his position for more than thirty years. He had little experience teaching prior to his appointment. He also taught at the Summer Chamber Music School at the University of Maine and at the Johannesen International School of the Arts in Victoria, British Columbia; at the former institution he was a replacement for Raya Garbousova, who wanted to spend time with her family during the summer instead of teach.

While teaching in British Columbia, Shapiro gave recitals at the McPherson Playhouse marking the 50th anniversary of his professional debut on August 10, 1986 and his 80th birthday in 1991. He was partnered respectively with pianists Ruth Laredo and Jane Hayes. At the former concert, Shapiro played despite broken ribs and a torn muscle incurred from a fall a few days before. Nevertheless, Audrey Johnson of the Times-Colonist approved of his performance, writing that he "played the cello as though his hands and arms were a part of his instrument, an extension of his musical instinct and profound understanding." Another reviewer for the same paper, Mikki Reintjes, wrote of Shapiro's 80th birthday recital in 1991:

If ever a concert in Victoria was deserving of adulation and respect, it was Sunday night's solo cello recital given by Harvey Shapiro at the McPherson Playhouse [...] What was most impressive about Shapiro was not just his technical eloquence and finesse, but the unforced artistry with which he played. There was no showmanship or gimmicks in this performance. Shapiro's performance contained some of the most honest music-making that Victorians have had the privilege of hearing. [...] [T]he tone colors that Shapiro pulled from his cello were simply amazing.

Shapiro was one of the performers at the Naumberg Foundation's 70th anniversary gala concert on December 11, 1996. He was the eldest of all the Naumberg Prize winners on the program.

He remained an active teacher into his 90s, despite health problems, including arthritis, broken hips, failing eyesight, and cancer. He devised alternate fingerings in order to mitigate his arthritis. In March 1998 he gave a very well received recital at the Prinzregententheater in Munich. He continued to give master classes in Europe, notably in Salzburg, Vienna, Engelberg and Florence until 2006.

== Teaching ==
Shapiro's renown as a teacher led him to be referred to by students and colleagues as a "cello doctor". Mstislav Rostropovich called Shapiro the "greatest cello teacher in the world." Among the observers at his classes were other instrumentalists, as well as professional colleagues, including on one occasion the Quartetto Italiano. Jeremy Denk also studied with Shapiro briefly, reporting that he had learned how to use rubato from him.

Shapiro developed a reputation among some of his students for his temper and use of profanity. He also told students who ignored his lessons to seek other teachers. One of his students, James Kreger, wrote that Shapiro's methods were well intentioned:

It can be very tough on someone who expects to get praised all the time. But later, you realize the value of everything he says. [...] [A]t the same time, there was something that I knew made me play better. Many times I would go home after a very hard lesson—knowing that, at the lesson, he really did get me to play so much better—and I'd take out my cello right away and play. And some of that carried over from the lesson, to my amazement. Of course, I lost some of it a day or two later, but some of it did stick. Gradually, each time, I retained more and more—and I didn't feel that with other teachers.

Another former student was Stefan Reuss, who later became principal cello of the Rochester Philharmonic Orchestra. In his youth he was in Illinois enrolled in a study abroad program from his native Germany when he met Shapiro, who invited him to New York City to become his student:

Shapiro brought all of the different aspects of cello playing together for me. He taught not just technique, but the importance of sound.

In a 1972 interview, Shapiro explained his philosophy of teaching:

Well, I certainly don't teach merely to inculcate technique. I love music. Of course, one must have technique that will enable him to do anything he wishes, but it must not be the end-all be-all. My students must develop a decent tone—with a piece of music, not with an exercise. And they have got to have technique for proper shifting, sliding, bowing, vibrato, glissandi. But all of these lead directly to interpretation, precisely where personal attention is required. In the 1980s, Shapiro once called over a student pianist he particularly respected and admired for his musicianship during his performances at Lincoln Center and at Juilliard. Walking up to him in the hallway from the studio where he taught, Shapiro called him over to give him some advice about teaching. He said something that the young man could not understand at the time, but often recalled in his life. Shapiro said, Josef - let me save you some pain and disappointment ahead of time: I admire your talent and depth as a musician. In this world, teach only as much as the student can accept and never more than it will take to have your student return again. It took a long time for the idealistic pianist to understand these seemingly cynical words of advice. In his book, Josef Verba recalls the moment as profound and heartwarming. He did not know the magnitude of the experience and the complement enclosed in confidence and trust of this advice. Shapiro could be direct, but as many other teachers of his generation, for those who could accept his teaching and advice, he gave it.

== Instrument ==
Shapiro played the "Saphir" cello, now also known as the "Ex-Shapiro", which was made in 1727 by luthier Matteo Goffriller. In 2006, Shapiro heard fellow cellist Daniel Müller-Schott on a radio broadcast of a concert that had been performed at Carnegie Hall. Müller-Schott, who was then at the beginning of his career, later met Shapiro, who offered to sell him the "Saphir" for US$2,000,000 (equivalent to $3,194,123 in 2025). Upon first viewing the "Saphir", Müller-Schott recalled feeling "love at first sight", and purchased the instrument with help of a sponsor. He said he felt "honored and moved" to own it.

== Personal life ==
Shapiro was married to violinist Rena Robbins from 1947 until her death in 1980. She was a violinist in the Metropolitan Opera Orchestra.

According to him, he smoked and drank whiskey regularly because his teacher Willeke had also done so.

Shapiro died in New York on October 25, 2007. According to his wishes, no funeral or memorial service was conducted.

== Discography ==
- Harvey Shapiro Recital in Japan. DiscArt DACD-973.
- The Art of Nathan Milstein. EMI Classics.
- Primrose Quartet (works by Haydn, Schumann, Smetana, Brahms and Tchaikovsky). Biddulph Records.

Out of print:

- Dmitri Shostakovich and Richard Strauss cello sonatas, Harvey Shapiro, cello and Jascha Zayde, piano. Nonesuch LP record, H-71050
- Rachmaninoff, Cello Sonata in G Minor, Op. 19, Kodaly, Sonata Op. 4 for Cello and Piano, Harvey Shapiro, cello and Earl Wild, piano. Nonesuch LP record H-71155
- Luigi Boccherini, String Quintets Op. 13 No. 5 in E, Op. 20 No. 4 in F, Op. 37 No. 2 in g, the Stradivari Quartet with Harvey Shapiro, 2nd cello. Musical Heritage Society LP record, MHS 645
- Luigi Boccherini, String Quintets Op. 37 No. 1 in C, Quintet in C, Op. 47 No. 1 in a, the Stradivari Quartet with Harvey Shapiro, 2nd cello. Musical Heritage Society LP record, MHS 694
- Haydn, Symphony No. 95 in c (with cello solo in the trio), Fritz Reiner and "His Symphony Orchestra", Harvey Shapiro, cello. RCA LSC-2742/LM-2742. [1964]
- Hindemith: Eight Pieces for String Quartet, Radio Artists String Quartet (Harold Glickman, Hugo Fiorato, violins, Jack Braunstein, viola, Harvey Shapiro, cello). Circle Records LP record L-51-100. [1951]

== Sources ==
- Rubinsky, Jane (September 2001). "Harvey Shapiro at 90". The Juilliard Journal. XVII (1). Archived from the original on August 27, 2003.
- "Teacher: Harvey Shapiro". Cellist database. May 15, 2004. Archived from the original on July 2, 2004.
