= Taxpayer (building) =

Small building to provide offsetting property tax income

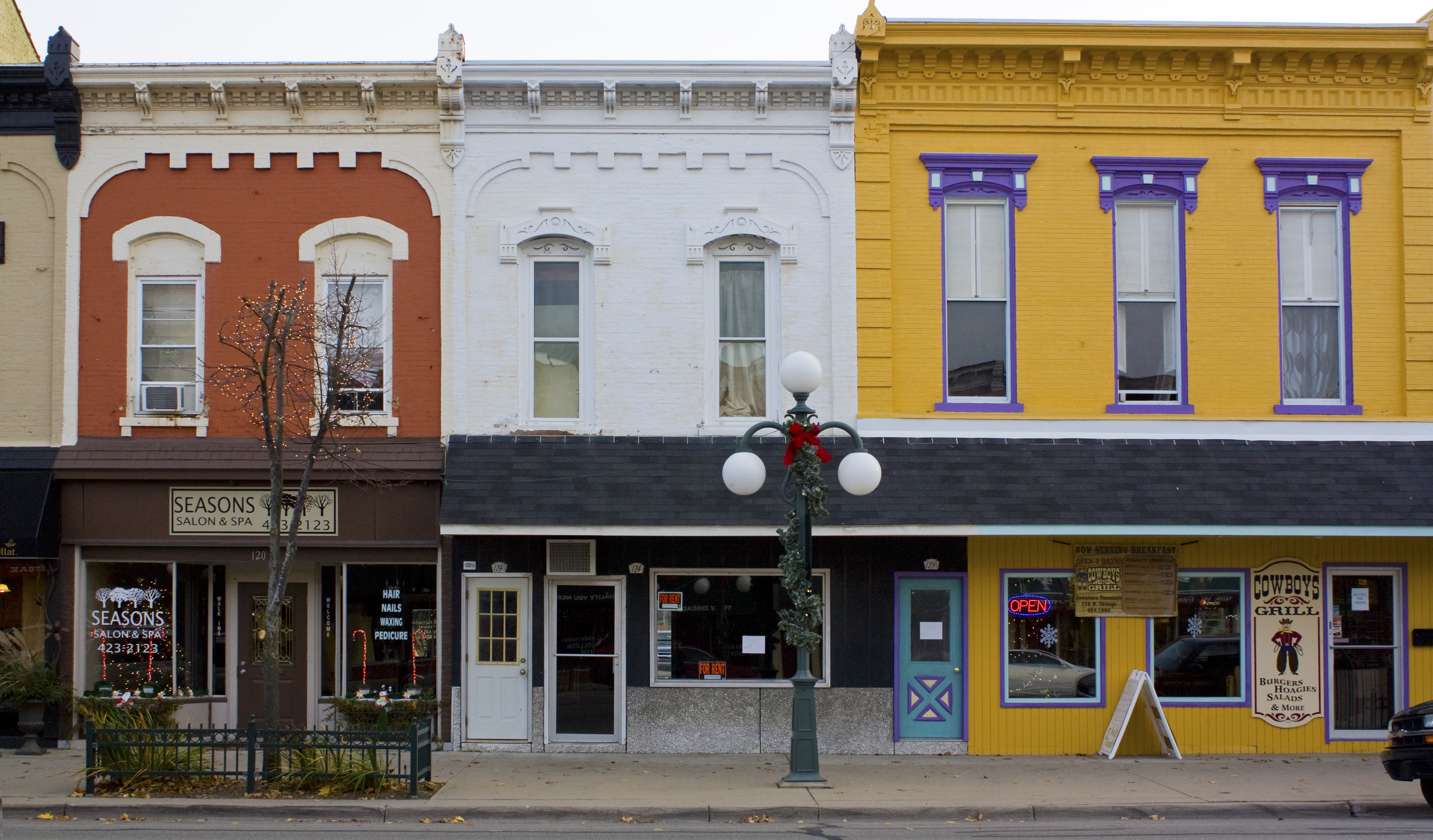
Examples of commercial taxpayer buildings in Tecumseh, Michigan

In US real estate, urban planning, and especially firefighting, a taxpayer refers to a small one- or two-story building built to cover the owner's annual property tax assessed for owning a parcel of land. Taxpayers are most commonly mixed use structures with commercial occupancies on the first floor and residential use above. Such a building is usually constructed with the hope that it can soon be redeveloped into a larger building capable of generating more revenue, or simply to hold a parcel of land along a new road or especially a streetcar line while waiting for value to appreciate. The building style was generally replaced with strip malls as the automobile became dominant in the mid 20th Century.

== History ==
In the wake of the Great Depression, taxpayers proliferated across New York City, ending the period of high-rise buildings; while just 7 percent of building plans filed in 1929 for the busy 3rd, Lexington, and Madison Avenues were for one- to three-story buildings, every plan was for such a building by 1933. Despite being intended as temporary buildings, many survived for a half-century or more.

== Hazards ==
Taxpayer buildings are criticized for being poorly or cheaply built but allow a developer to stay in business while they wait for more favorable conditions. A fire in a taxpayer is a special hazard in firefighting. The poor-quality construction often burns readily, and the architecture tends to encourage backdrafts. Many have been renovated several times over and have concealed or undocumented voids. More modern taxpayers were built with fire-resistant materials and are less of a hazard.

== See also ==
- Strip Mall
