= Fiduciary Trust Company =

- Industry: Financial services
- Founded: 1885; 141 years ago
- Founder: Robert H. Gardiner
- Headquarters: Boston, United States
- Key people: Austin V. Shapard (CEO)
- Products: Wealth management
- Website: www.fiduciary-trust.com

Fiduciary Trust Company is a private wealth management firm headquartered in Boston, Mass United States. It serves high-net-worth families, individuals and nonprofits, as well as professional financial advisors and family offices. The firm provides customized wealth management, investment management, and trust and estate settlement services, as well as family office, tax, and custody services.

As of 1 June 2017, Fiduciary Trust had approximately $12.2 billion in assets under supervision The firm is ranked fifth on the Boston Business Journal’s 2017 list of the largest independent investment advisors in Massachusetts. Fiduciary Trust Company is not affiliated with the similarly named Fiduciary Trust Company International, which is a wholly owned subsidiary of Franklin Templeton Investments.

== History ==
Fiduciary Trust Company was founded in 1885 as a family office, and incorporated as a trust bank in 1928 by Robert H. Gardiner.

By 2017, the firm’s parent company, Fiduciary Company, Inc. (FCI), was an independent firm owned by current and former employees, directors and clients. FCI and Fiduciary Trust Company have identical boards of directors. In 2014, the company established the affiliated Fiduciary Trust Company of New England, based in Manchester, New Hampshire.

Fiduciary Trust Company is headquartered at Exchange Place, at 53 State Street, Boston, Massachusetts.

== Management ==
Austin V. Shapard has been President and CEO of Fiduciary Trust since 2014. He is the eighth president of the company. His predecessors include: Douglas Smith-Peterson, Daniel Phillips, Gilman Nichols, Edward Osgood, and Robert Gardiner.
