= Olympic Music Festival =

Held in Quilcene, Washington

Coordinates: 48.1283185°N 122.782361°W

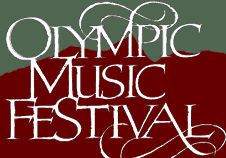

The Olympic Music Festival is a classical music event based in Port Townsend, Washington.

The festival was founded in 1984 by Alan Iglitzin as Olympic Music Festival, Concerts in the Barn. For 32 seasons, concerts were held in a barn in Quilcene, Washington. In 2016, The OMF name was granted to a separate organization, which presented their first season at the Wheeler Theater at Fort Worden in partnership with the Centrum Foundation.

Subsequently, the original festival was renamed "Concerts in the Barn" and continues in the original site in Quilcene.
