= Grammy Award for Best New Classical Artist =

- Awarded for: quality classical artists
- Country: United States
- Presented by: National Academy of Recording Arts and Sciences
- First award: 1964 (Most Promising New Classical Recording Artist)
- Final award: 1986
- Website: grammy.com

The Grammy Award for Best New Classical Artist was an honor presented to classical artists in 1964, 1965, 1966 and 1986. The Grammy Awards, an annual ceremony that was established in 1958 and originally called the Gramophone Awards, are presented by the National Academy of Recording Arts and Sciences of the United States to "honor artistic achievement, technical proficiency and overall excellence in the recording industry, without regard to album sales or chart position".

The award was first known as Most Promising New Classical Recording Artist was first presented to André Watts at the 6th Grammy Awards in 1964. The honor was presented for additional years until being discontinued before the 1967 ceremony. The award category re-emerged in 1986 with the name Best New Classical Artist and was presented to Chicago Pro Musica. As of 2023, the award has not been presented since 1986.

== Recipients ==
Year	Winner(s)	Nominees	Ref.
1964	André Watts	Abbey Singers; Alirio Diaz; Colin Davis; John Ogdon; Fou Ts'ong	
1965	Marilyn Horne	Mirella Freni; Igor Kipnis; Judith Raskin; Jess Thomas	
1966	Peter Serkin	Nicolai Ghiaurov; Evelyn Lear; Raymond Lewenthal; Shirley Verrett	
1986	Chicago Pro Musica	Sarah Brightman; Rosalind Plowright; Esa-Pekka Salonen; Brian Slawson	

=== 1964–1966 ===
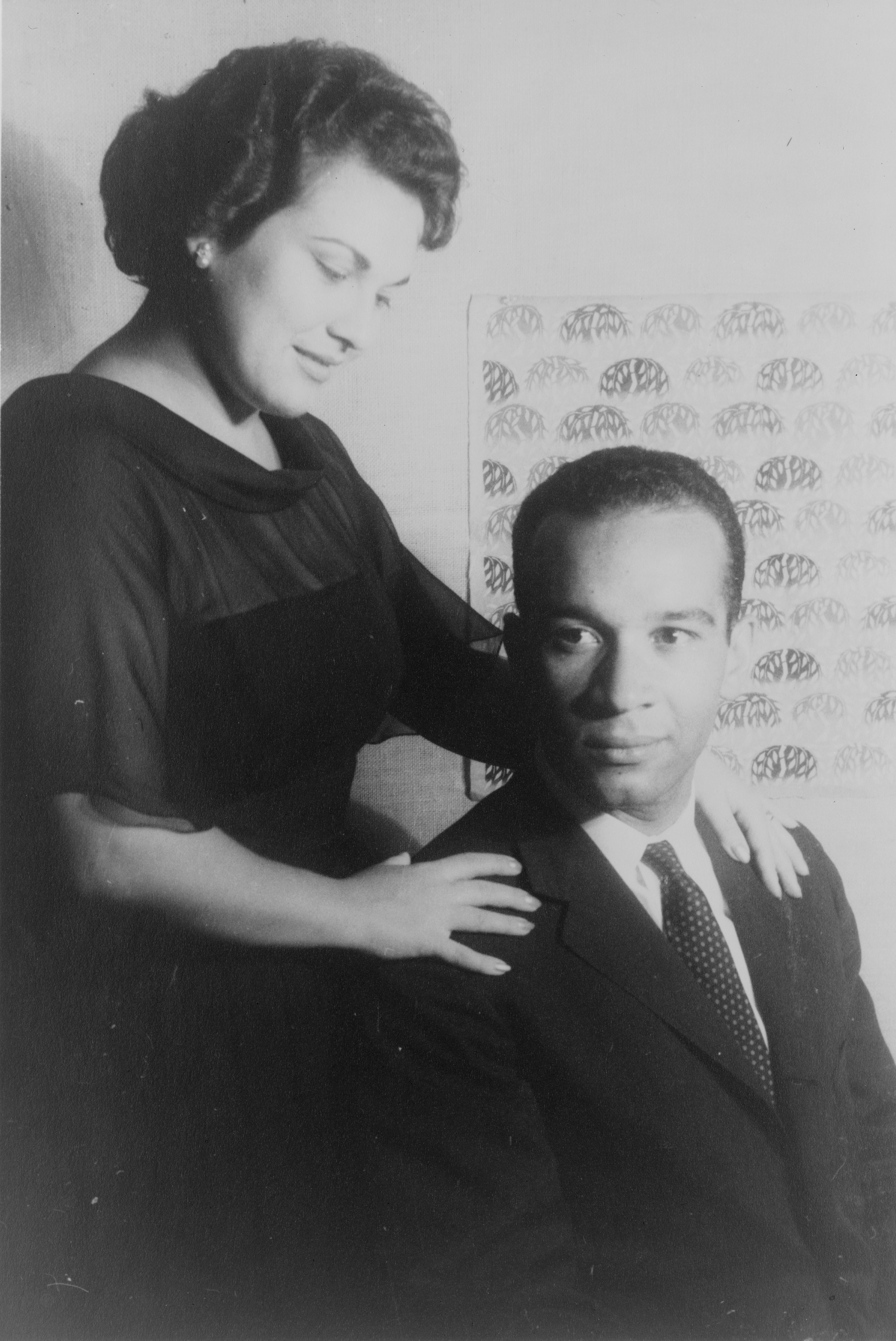
1965 award winner Marilyn Horne with double-bassist and conductor Henry Lewis in 1961

In 1963 NARAS representative John Scott Trotter announced that three new award categories—Best Album Notes, Best Original Score from a Motion Picture or Television Show, and Most Promising New Classical Recording Artist—would be introduced at the following ceremony. Most Promising New Classical Recording Artist nominees for the 6th Grammy Awards (1964) included André Watts for Liszt: Concerto No. 1 for Piano and Orchestra (with Leonard Bernstein conducting the New York Philharmonic). The award was presented to Watts at the Waldorf-Astoria Hotel in New York City.

For the 7th Grammy Awards (1965), nominees included Marilyn Horne for The Age of Bel Canto: Operatic Scenes (Bonynge, conductor). The award was presented to Horne. The classical radio station WQXR-FM included Horne's win in their list of the "Top 5 Classical Events of 1964–65", claiming her "triumphant debut" at Covent Garden as the character Marie in Alban Berg's opera Wozzeck along with her 1964 recording of Vincenzo Bellini's opera Norma with Joan Sutherland contributed to her success.

Nominees for the 8th Grammy Awards (1966) included Peter Serkin for Bach: Goldberg Variations. The honor was presented to Serkin, the teenage pianist son of Rudolf Serkin, in New York City. Serkin was later nominated for Best Classical Vocal Performance at the 52nd Grammy Awards (2010) for his work on the album Recital at Ravinia (with Lorraine Hunt Lieberson).

=== 1986 ===
Best New Classical Artist nominees for the 28th Grammy Awards (1986) included soprano Sarah Brightman for her work in Andrew Lloyd Webber's Requiem, Chicago Pro Musica for Stravinsky: L' Histoire Du Soldat (The Soldier's Tale - Suite) and Walton: Façade (An Instrumental Suite in the Original Scoring), Rosalind Plowright, Finnish conductor Esa-Pekka Salonen, and Brian Slawson for the album Bach on Wood. Salonen was considered a strong contender by Billboard magazine.

The award was presented to Chicago Pro Musica, which recorded for a company called Reference.

== See also ==
- Willard Elliot, member of Chicago Pro Musica
- Grammy Award for Best Classical Album
- Grammy Award for Producer of the Year, Classical
- List of Grammy Award categories
