= Baby Sensory =

British early childhood education programme

- Founded: 2003
- Founder: Lin Day
- Headquarters: United Kingdom
- Area served: Worldwide
- Parent: WOW World Group
- Website: babysensory.com

Baby Sensory is a registered British early childhood education programme designed to support parents with their baby’s learning and development through sensory stimulation. Founded in 2003 by Lin Day, the programme operates worldwide, offering classes designed to foster cognitive, physical, and emotional growth. Baby Sensory operates under the WOW World Group, which encompasses related programmes such as Toddler Sense and Hello Baby.

== History ==
Lin Day, a British doctor of biomedical sciences, educationalist, writer, songwriter, and author, founded Baby Sensory in 2003 with an inaugural class initially attended by three participants. The programme quickly grew across Wiltshire and Hampshire. In 2006, Baby Sensory was officially established as a company with business partners Ian and Keeley Sharland and expanded through a franchise model to reach a broader audience.

In 2016, the WOW World Group was formed, bringing Baby Sensory and its sister programmes under a unified organisational structure.

== Educational philosophy and pedagogy ==
Baby Sensory provides a curriculum focused on sensory exploration to promote cognitive, physical, and emotional development in infants, and parent-baby bonding. Each session is designed to engage babies through a combination of songs, games, sensory activities, and tactile experiences.

Classes are structured to include sensory-rich activities such as music, movement, and tactile exploration for children aged 0–13 months. Its activities are based on scientific research to reflect advancements in early childhood education. Educational practices also include sign language, baby massage, sensory integration techniques, and learning and developmental information for parents. These activities are adaptable for children with developmental delays or sensory impairments.

Baby Sensory has developed educational tools, including books, sensory toys, apps, music, and the Say Hello product range. Since 1987, many of these products were developed by Lin Day at her nursery school in Wiltshire, including Sea and Jungle Cloths, Rope Snake, Jingle Ring, Play Band, and ‘Say Hello to the Sun’ songs and music, which are now integral to the Baby Sensory programme. The song, "Say Hello to the Sun", reached number 1 on the children’s UK singles chart in 2019.

== Awards ==
Baby Sensory and its affiliated programmes have received several accolades, including:

- Netmums Favourite Pre-School Gold Award (2012)
- Tommy’s Community Diamond Award (2015, 2017)
- What’s On for Little Ones Best Baby Development Class (2008)
- Children’s Activity Association 5 Star Gold Accreditation (2016)
- Mums Views Number 1 Brand for Baby Activities (2017)
- What’s On 4 Kids Award: Best National Baby Development Activity (2013)
- What’s On 4 Kids Award: Best Exported Activity for Children (2014, 2015, 2016)
- What’s On 4 Kids Award: Best pre/Post Natal Activity (National) (2014)
- What’s On 4 Kids Award: Best Children's Party Entertainment (2014, 2017, 2018)
- What’s On 4 Kids Award: Best National Baby & Toddler Development Activity (newborn - 2 years) (2014, 2016)
- What’s On 4 Kids Award: Baby & Toddler Activity More than 25 franchisees/ licenses (2017, 2019)
- What’s On 4 Kids Award: Best Baby Activity (2021, 2022, 2023, 2024)

== Philanthropy ==
Baby Sensory supports charitable initiatives through its partnership with Tommy’s, a national baby charity. Baby Sensory Sensathon events have funded research into pregnancy and neonatal care. From 2014 to 2024, Baby Sensory has raised nearly £2 million for Tommy’s. In addition, it has raised over £26,000 for Caudwell Children in association with the Wow World Group as part of Children’s Activity Week.

Baby sensory also partnered with OnSide Youth Zones, to launch BabyZone, to make sensory classes available to low income families.
