= George Sakakeeny =

American bassoonist (born 1956)

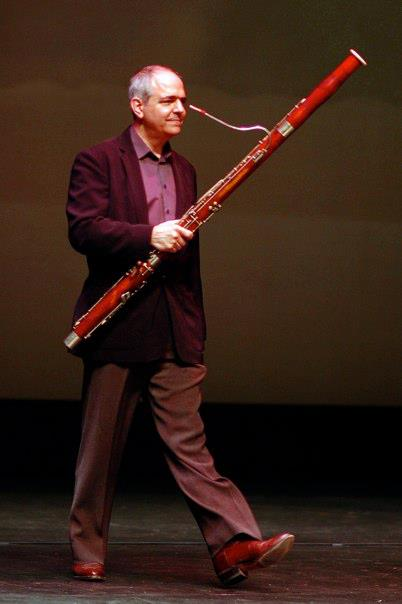
- Sakakeeny in 2012

Background information
- Born: January 8, 1956 (age 70); Chicago, Illinois
- Occupations: Musician; professor
- Years active: 1978-present

George Sakakeeny (born January 8, 1956) is an American bassoonist and professor of bassoon at the Tianjin Juilliard School. He was formerly professor of bassoon at the Eastman School of Music from 2016 to 2026 and the Oberlin Conservatory from 1989 to 2016. Sakakeeny is known for continuing the pedagogical legacy of his teacher K. David Van Hoesen, and the Eastman School of bassoon playing.

== Early life ==
Sakakeeny was born in Chicago and moved to San Diego, California at the age of 12. He originally studied viola in grade school, and aspired to be a professional musician from an early age. He became interested in the sound of the english horn after attending a live chamber music concert, and ultimately made the switch to bassoon after finding an abandoned instrument in his school band room. He went on to attend the Eastman School of Music from 1974 to 1978 where he studied bassoon with K. David Van Hoesen. He was classmates with many other prominent American bassoonists of his generation, including Judith LeClair of the New York Philharmonic, Barrick Stees of the Cleveland Orchestra, Jonathan Sherwin of the Cleveland Orchestra, Toni Lipton of the Metropolitan Opera Orchestra, Felicia Foland of the St. Louis Symphony, and Betsy Sturdevant of the Columbus Symphony.

== Career ==
Sakakeeny was appointed to his first playing job as principal bassoon of the Singapore Symphony while on tour with the Eastman Wind Ensemble in 1978. A year later in 1979, he was appointed principal bassoon of the New Japan Philharmonic by music director Seiji Ozawa. Sakakeeny served in this capacity until 1983, when he moved to Boston to join the Handel and Haydn Society. While in Boston, Sakakeeny was principal bassoon of the Opera Company of Boston, and performed with the Boston Symphony and Boston Pops orchestras.

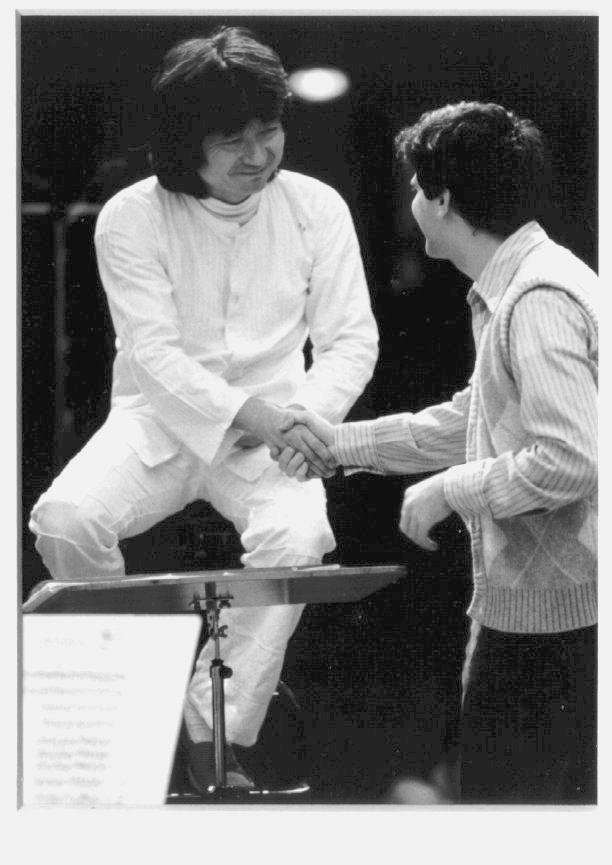
Sakakeeny with Seiji Ozawa in Tokyo

In 1989, he was named professor of bassoon at the Oberlin Conservatory of Music. In the decades that followed under Sakakeeny, the bassoon studio gained international recognition. His students have gone on to win professional playing positions in the Minnesota Orchestra, St. Louis Symphony, National Symphony Orchestra, Baltimore Symphony, Kansas City Symphony, Florida Orchestra, Phoenix Symphony, and the Indianapolis Symphony. His students have also pioneered alternative music ensembles such as the International Contemporary Ensemble, Ensemble Dal Niente, and the Imani Winds.

Sakakeeny was bassoon faculty at the Aspen Music Festival and School, the Eastern Music Festival, and has played principal bassoon with the Grand Teton Music Festival, the New Hampshire Music Festival, and the Peninsula Music Festival. In 2025, Sakakeeny was named acting principal bassoon of the Fort Worth Symphony Orchestra by music director Robert Spano. In December of 2025, Sakakeeny was announced as the new resident bassoon faculty at the Tianjin Juilliard School.

While faculty at Oberlin in 2014, Sakakeeny released an iBook titled Making Reeds Start to Finish detailing his approach to bassoon reed making. He performs on Heckel bassoon #8683, the last verified "pre-war" Heckel bassoon.

== Selected discography ==
- Blechinger Faggottkonzert (Harmonia Classica, 1997)
- 25th Anniversary International Double Reed Society (Crystal Records, 1997)
- Full Moon in the City (Oberlin Music Label, 2013)
- Schickele Bassoon Concerto (Oberlin Music Label, 2015)
