= Vosburgh =

Vosburgh is a surname. Notable people with the surname include:

- Alfred D. Vosburgh (1890-1958), American actor better known as Gayne Whitman.
- Dick Vosburgh (1929–2007), American comedy writer and lyricist.
- Tilly Vosburgh (born 1960), English actress.
- George Vosburgh, American trumpet player.

== See also ==
- Vosburgh Stakes, American thoroughbred horse race
