= K. David Van Hoesen =

American bassoonist (1926–2016)

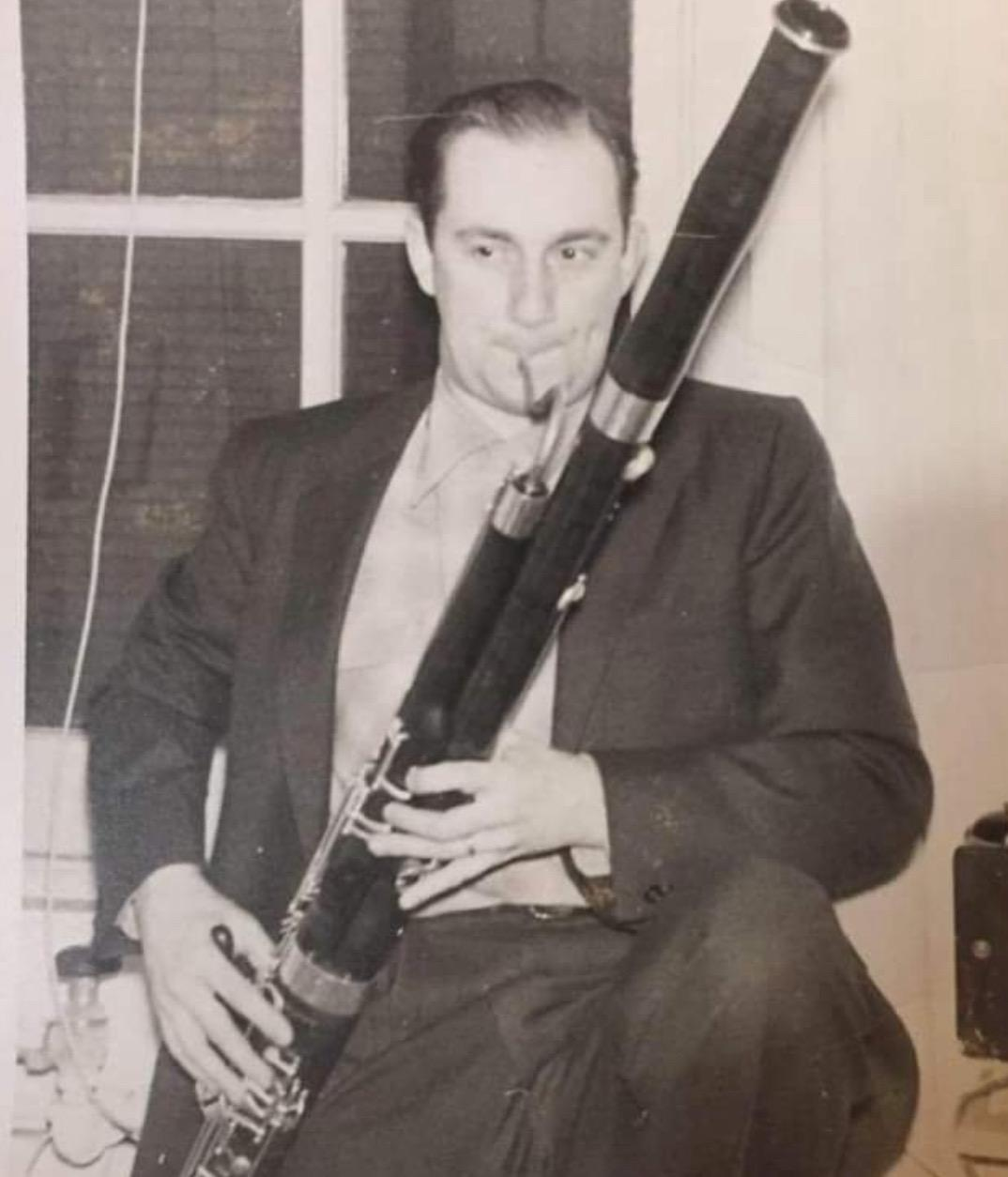
- Van Hoesen in 1952

Background information
- Born: June 29, 1926; Rochester, New York
- Died: October 3, 2016 (aged 90) Pittsburgh, Pennsylvania
- Genre: Orchestral
- Occupations: Performer; professor
- Years active: 1946-2016
- Formerly of: Cleveland Orchestra; Rochester Philharmonic; Interlochen Arts Camp

Karl David Van Hoesen (June 29, 1926 – October 3, 2016) was an American bassoonist and professor of bassoon at the Eastman School of Music, where he succeeded his teacher Vincent Pezzi. During his career, Van Hoesen was second bassoon of the Cleveland Orchestra, and principal bassoon of the Rochester Philharmonic. Van Hoesen became well known as a bassoon pedagogue, and his students went on to occupy positions in the majority of American symphony orchestras.

== Life and career ==
Van Hoesen was born in Rochester, New York, and began playing bassoon in the Rochester public school system. His father, violinist and conductor Karl Van Hoesen, taught at the Eastman School and in the Rochester public schools. He attended the Eastman School of Music from 1946 to 1950, and graduated on June 12, 1950, with a bachelor's degree and performer's certificate in bassoon. While at Eastman in 1947, he was invited to play bassoon with the Lake Placid Sinfonietta. In 1948, Van Hoesen purchased Heckel bassoon #9280, which he went on to play for the remainder of his career.

In the fall of 1950, Van Hoesen was appointed the inaugural bassoon instructor at the Oberlin Conservatory of Music. Shortly thereafter in 1951, he was appointed to the position of second bassoon with the Cleveland Orchestra by George Szell. Van Hoesen was also named bassoon professor at the Cleveland Institute of Music, teaching there from 1952 to 1954. In 1954, he won the position of principal bassoon with the Rochester Philharmonic, which at the time was a joint position with professorship at the Eastman School of Music. In 1957, Van Hoesen auditioned for the position of principal bassoon of the Philadelphia Orchestra, but was named runner up to Bernard Garfield.

Van Hoesen retired from the Rochester Philharmonic in 1976, and retired from his teaching position at Eastman in 1991. He continued playing bassoon with the Lake Placid Sinfonietta until 2011. He died in Pittsburgh, PA on October 3, 2016.

== Notable students ==
- Ann Bilderback, principal bassoon Kansas City Symphony 2000-present
- Diane Bishop, principal bassoon Orlando Symphony 1993-2023
- Judith LeClair, principal bassoon New York Philharmonic 1981-present
- Douglas Fisher, second bassoon Columbus Symphony Orchestra 1984-present
- Felicia Foland, second bassoon St. Louis Symphony 1990-2022
- Peter Grenier, contrabassoon Buffalo Philharmonic 1980-1982, contrabassoon Dallas Symphony 1982-present
- Eric Hall, principal bassoon Canadian Opera Company, Grant Park Orchestra, Hamilton Philharmonic Orchestra 2006-Present
- Sue Heineman, principal bassoon National Symphony Orchestra (USA) 2000-present
- John Hunt, third professor of bassoon at the Eastman School of Music 1991-2016
- Fraser Jackson, contrabassoon Toronto Symphony Orchestra 1990-present
- Phillip Kolker, principal bassoon Baltimore Symphony 1972-2010
- Toni Lipton, contrabassoon Metropolitan Opera Orchestra 1979-2008
- Hugh Michie, second bassoon Cincinnati Symphony 1990-present
- Laura Najarian, principal bassoon Savannah Symphony 1990-2005, second bassoon Atlanta Symphony 2005-present
- Roger Nye, second bassoon New York Philharmonic 2005-present
- Stephen Paulson, principal bassoon San Francisco Symphony 1977-2023
- Kathleen Reynolds, second bassoon Rochester Philharmonic 1973-1995, principal bassoon Dallas Opera Orchestra 1995-2020, professor of bassoon at the University of North Texas 2000-2021.
- Jeff Robinson, contrabassoon Houston Symphony 1992-2017, principal bassoon Chautauqua Symphony 2004-present
- George Sakakeeny, fourth professor of bassoon at the Eastman School of Music 2016-2026, professor of bassoon at the Oberlin Conservatory of Music 1988-2016
- David Savige, second bassoon National Symphony Orchestra 1999-2001, second bassoon Virginia Symphony 1996-2026
- Marcus Schoon, contrabassoon Detroit Symphony 1992-2024
- Daniel Shelly, second bassoon Metropolitan Opera Orchestra 2004-present
- Jonathan Sherwin, contrabassoon Colorado Symphony, Cleveland Orchestra 1998-present
- Martha Sholl, second bassoon Rochester Philharmonic 1988-present
- Barrick Stees, associate principal bassoon Cleveland Orchestra 2001-2023
- Betsy Sturdevant, principal bassoon Columbus Symphony 1980-present
