= Brian Slawson =

American musician

Brian Slawson (born 1956) is an American percussionist, arranger and composer. He is best known for his Grammy-nominated recording, Bach On Wood.

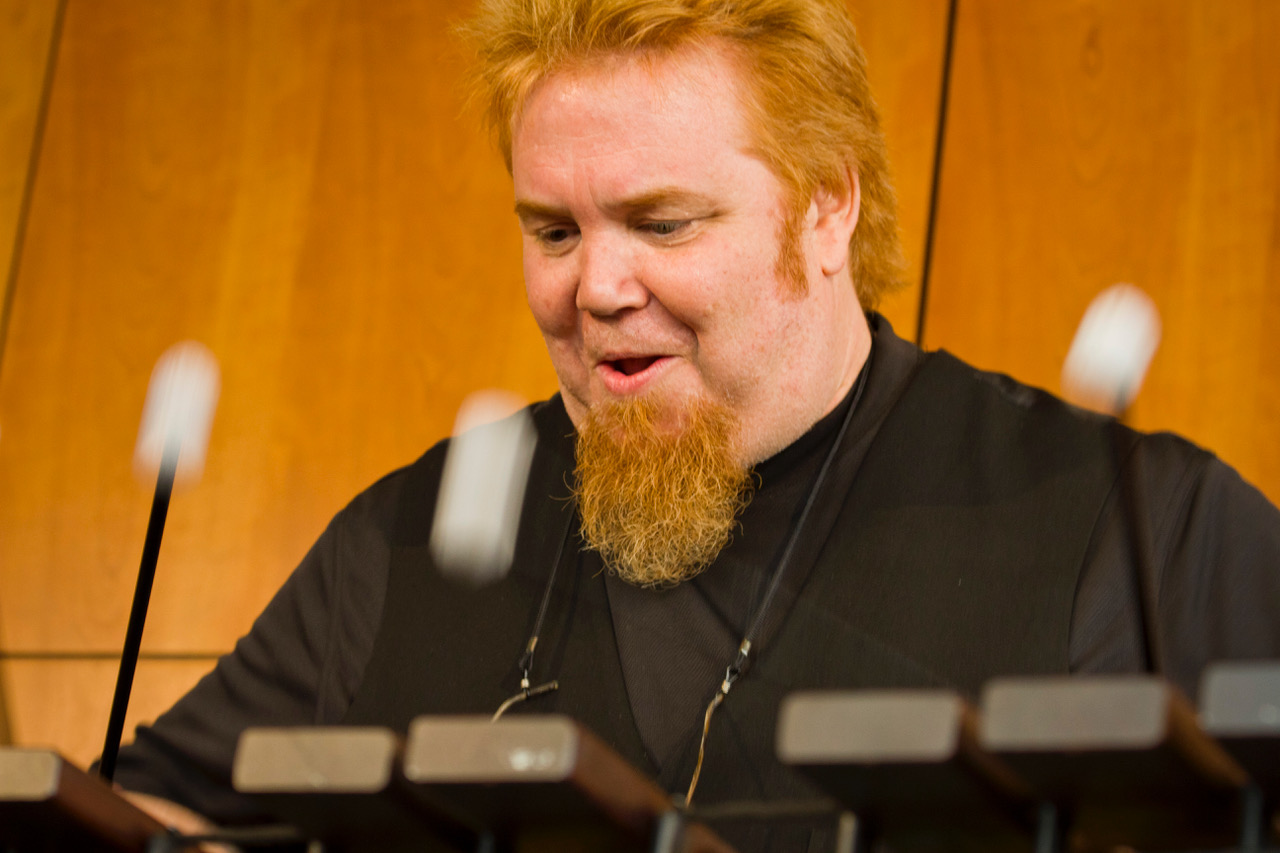

== Early life ==
Brian Montgomery Slawson was born on August 2, 1956, to Ronald and Mildred Slawson in Plattsburgh, New York and was raised in Brookfield, Connecticut. At age 7, he played snare drum in a local fife & drum corps, leading to private drum set instruction at age 10. Brian attended Brookfield High School. After preliminary studies in percussion at the Hartt School, Slawson attended the Juilliard School in New York. Soon after, he signed his first recording contract with CBS Masterworks. Brian’s debut release, Bach On Wood, garnered Slawson a “Best New Classical Artist” Grammy nomination. His followup recording, Distant Drums, featured performances with guitar icon Stevie Ray Vaughan and jazz trumpet great Freddie Hubbard.

== Professional career ==
A sought after studio musician, stage performer and clinician, Brian's multimedia company, Slawsongs, produces custom music for film, television and radio. He is Principal Timpanist of the Brevard Symphony Orchestra, Professor of Percussion at Eastern Florida State College and Holy Trinity Episcopal Academy, (https://www.htacademy.org) and a published author for Alfred Music Publishing and Tapspace Publications (https://www.tapspace.com). Slawson is the voice of Gusto the Bulldog in Warner Bros. Music Expressions, appears in Macmillan/McGraw-Hill's Spotlight on Music and is a featured performer at Lincoln Center's Meet the Artist Series. Brian also produces television music for Warner Bros. Discovery Networks.

Slawson has performed with Leonard Bernstein, Aaron Copland, Joshua Bell, Itzhak Perlman, Isaac Stern, John Cage, Robert Shaw, Bernard Haitink, Marvin Hamlisch and opera great, Jessye Norman. He has recorded with pop icons from Stevie Ray Vaughan to Marie Osmond, punctuated jokes for comedians Jerry Seinfeld, Eddie Murphy, Bill Maher, Paul Reiser and Don Rickles, and performed on hundreds of national television and radio commercials (including American Express, Budweiser, Exxon/Mobil, Coca-Cola, Nabisco, McDonald's, IBM, Burger King, Chrysler and Chevrolet).

As a studio percussionist, Brian has recorded with drummers Steve Gadd, Peter Erskine, Dave Weckl, Steve Ferrone, Andy Newmark, Allan Schwartzberg, Michael Shrieve, Chris Parker, Anton Fig and Grady Tate.

== Discography ==
- 1985 - Bach on Wood (CBS Masterworks)
- 1985 - A Yule Log (CBS FM)
- 1988 - Distant Drums (CBS FM)
- 1991 - Bach Beat (Sony Classical)
- 1999 - Boomer (Powkn)
- 2003 - XClassics (Belltone)
- 2010 - BoomerBeats (Belltone)

== Television and radio appearances (national) ==
- The Tonight Show
- Entertainment Tonight
- CBS Morning News
- All Things Considered (National Public Radio)

== Sponsored endorsements ==
- Ludwig-Musser
- Zildjian
- Vic Firth
- Remo
- Rhythm Tech
- Alternate Mode
- Grover Pro Percussion

== Print music (listed by publisher) ==
The following is a list of published works by Slawson.

- 2011 Dynamic Solos for Snare Drum (Alfred Music Publishing)
- 2011 Classic Mallet Trios (Alfred Music Publishing)
- 2012 Dynamic Solos for Timpani (Alfred Music Publishing)
- 2012 Classic Mallet Trios Volume 2 (Alfred Music Publishing)
- 2013 Classic Mallet Trios - Tchaikovsky (Alfred Music Publishing)
- 2013 Classic Mallet Trios - Bach (Alfred Music Publishing)
- 2013 Dynamic Solos for Mallets (Alfred Music Publishing)
- 2014 Classic Mallet Trios - Beethoven (Alfred Music Publishing)
- 2014 Dynamic Duets for Snare Drum (Alfred Music Publishing)
- 2015 Dynamic Solos for Mallets (digital version) (Alfred Music Publishing)
- 2009 Two-Part Three-Pack (by J.S. Bach, arr. Slawson) (Tapspace Publications)
- 2009 Goldberg Variation 28 (by J.S. Bach, arr. Slawson) (Tapspace Publications)
- 2009 El Paso Waltz (Slawson) (Tapspace Publications)
- 2009 Concerto in A Minor (by J.S. Bach, arr. Slawson) (Tapspace Publications)
- 2009 Children's Medley (by J.S. Bach, arr. Slawson) (Tapspace Publications)
- 2009 Tale of the Dragon (Slawson) (Tapspace Publications)
- 2009 Odd Duck (Slawson) (Tapspace Publications)
- 2009 Winter (by Vivaldi, arr. Slawson) (Tapspace Publications)
- 2009 Entrance of the Queen of Sheba (by Handel, arr. Slawson) (Tapspace Publications)
- 2009 Sonata in F (by Handel, arr. Slawson) (Tapspace Publications)
- 2010 Jesu, Joy of Man's Desiring (by J.S. Bach, arr. Slawson) (Tapspace Publications)
- 2010 Scherzo from A Midsummer Night's Dream (by Mendelssohn, arr. Slawson) (Tapspace Publications)
- 2010 Top Tank (Slawson) (Tapspace Publications)
- 2011 Menuetto (by W.A. Mozart, arr. Slawson) (Tapspace Publications)
- 2011 Intermezzo from A Midsummer Night's Dream (by Mendelssohn, arr. Slawson) (Tapspace Publications)
- 2011 Brandenburg No. 2/Allegro Moderato (by J.S. Bach, arr. Slawson) (Tapspace Publications)
- 2011 Shepherd's Song (by Beethoven, arr. Slawson) (Tapspace Publications)
- 2012 Sonata in A Minor (by D. Scarlatti, arr. Slawson) (Tapspace Publications)
- 2012 Etude in C Sharp Minor (by Scriabin, arr. Slawson) (Tapspace Publications)
- 2012 The Three Banditos (Slawson) (Tapspace Publications)
- 2013 Sonata in F Minor (by D. Scarlatti, arr. Slawson) (Tapspace Publishing)
- 2013 Waltz in C Sharp Minor (by D. Scarlatti, arr. Slawson) (Tapspace Publishing)
- 2013 Danse Macabre (by Saint-Seans, arr. Slawson) (Tapspace Publishing)
- 2014 Upbeat Suite (by Bizet, Tchaikovsky, Mussorgsky, arr. Slawson) (Tapspace Publishing)
- 2015 Cemetery Salsa (Slawson) (Tapspace Publishing)
- 2015 The Storm (by Beethoven, arr. Slawson) (Tapspace Publishing)
- 2015 Waltz in C-Sharp Minor (by Chopin, arr. Slawson) (Tapspace Publishing)
- 2016 Beethoven's Fantasy (by Beethoven, arr. Slawson) (Tapspace Publishing)
- 2016 Animals (Slawson) (Tapspace Publishing)
- 2016 Pop Drop (Slawson) (Tapspace Publishing)
- 2016 Ticking Tacos (Slawson) (Tapspace Publishing)
- 2016 The Three Buccaneers (Slawson) (Tapspace Publishing)
- 2016 A Little Malletmusik (Slawson) (Tapspace Publishing)
- 2016 Three Romanian Dances (by Bartok, arr. Slawson) (Tapspace Publishing)
- 2016 Christmas Day (Slawson) (Tapspace Publishing)
- 2017 Animal Cracker Rag (Slawson) (Tapspace Publications)
- 2017 When You Hear the Drum (Slawson) (Tapspace Publishing)
- 2017 Jokers Wild (Slawson) (Tapspace Publishing)
- 2018 Soca Polka (Slawson) (Tapspace Publishing)
- 2018 Angels in the Moonlight (Slawson) (Tapspace Publishing)
- 2018 Cemetery Salsa (Slawson) (Tapspace Publishing)
- 2018 Bongito (Slawson) (Tapspace Publishing)
- 2018 Cricket (Slawson) (Tapspace Publishing)
- 2019 Two-Beat Tango (Slawson) (Tapspace Publishing)
- 2019 Dreams from the Dark Forest (Slawson) (Tapspace Publishing)
- 2019 Pistoleros (Slawson) (Tapspace Publishing)
- 2019 Into the Light / Füm Drum (Slawson) (Tapspace Publishing)
- 2020 Teardrop for Vibraphone (Slawson) (Tapspace Publishing)
- 2020 Winterland (Slawson) (Tapspace Publishing)
- 2021 Little Lullabies (mixed composers, arr. Slawson) (Tapspace Publications)
- 2021 Loggerhead (Bach, Handel, Dvorák, arr. Slawson) (Tapspace Publications)
- 2021 Santa’s Strut (Slawson) (Tapspace Publications)
- 2021 Nañigo Navidad (Slawson) (Tapspace Publications)
- 2022 Frightmare (Beethoven, arr. Slawson) (Tapspace Publications)
- 2022 Opa! (Slawson) (Tapspace Publications)
- 2022 Fife & Drum (Slawson) (Tapspace Publications)
- 2022 Candlesticks (Slawson) (Tapspace Publications)
- 2022 Heartland (Rameau & Dvorák, arr. Slawson) (Tapspace Publications)
- 2022 Pelican (Slawson) (Tapspace Publications)
- 2023 Clockbox (Boccherini, arr. Slawson) (Tapspace Publications)
- 2023 Rockbox (Slawson) (Tapspace Publications)
- 2023 Roundup (Slawson) (Tapspace Publications)
- 2023 Song For All Seasons (Slawson, Arbeau) (Tapspace Publications)
- 2023 An American Dream (Slawson) (Tapspace Publications)
- 2023 Rock the Gavotte (Rameau, Dittersdorf, arr. Slawson) (Tapspace Publications)
- 2023 Book Bash (Slawson) (Tapspace Publications)
- 2023 Tangito (Slawson) (Tapspace Publications)
- 2023 la Vida de la Noche (Slawson) (Tapspace Publications)
- 2024 Tank Time (Slawson) (Tapspace Publications)
- 2024 Bulb Horn Polka (Slawson) (Tapspace Publications)
- 2024 Yes & No (Slawson) (Tapspace Publications)
- 2025 Flapjack (Dittersdorf, J.C. Bach, arr. Slawson) (Tapspace Publications)
- 2025 Strum (Slawson) (Tapspace Publications)
- 2025 In The Bleak Midwinter (Holst, arr. Slawson) (Tapspace Publications)

== Personal website ==
www.slawsongs.com
