= Headless tambourine =

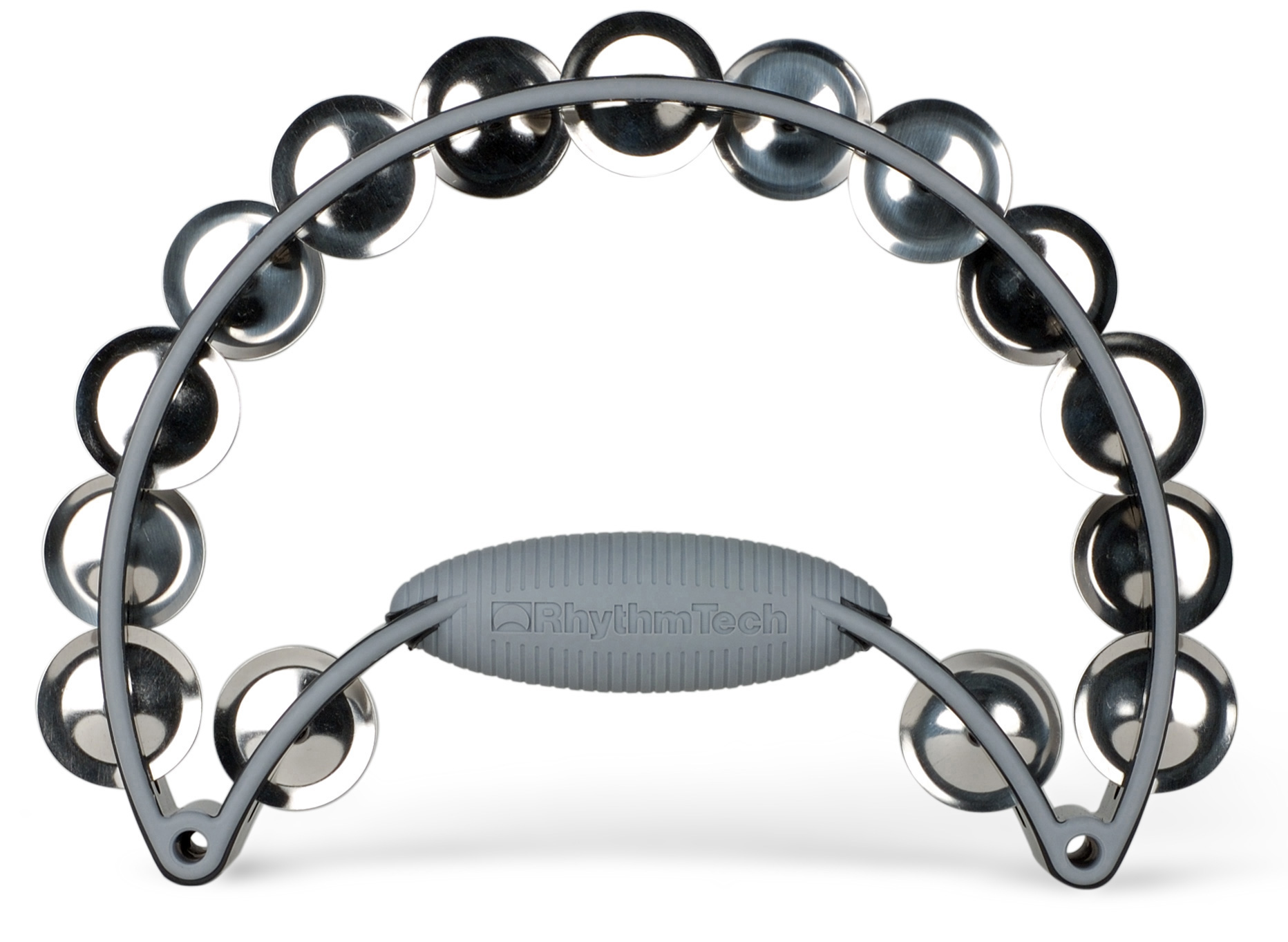
Rhythm Tech headless tambourine

The sound of a headless tambourine.

The headless tambourine differs from the standard tambourine by not having a drumhead. It is called "headless" because it lacks the drumhead, that is, the skin stretched over one side of the ring in a traditional tambourine. It produces a rhythmic jingling sound or a shake roll.

Jazz, pop and rock drummers sometimes mount a headless tambourine in the drum kit.
