= Willard Elliot =

American bassoonist (1926–2000)

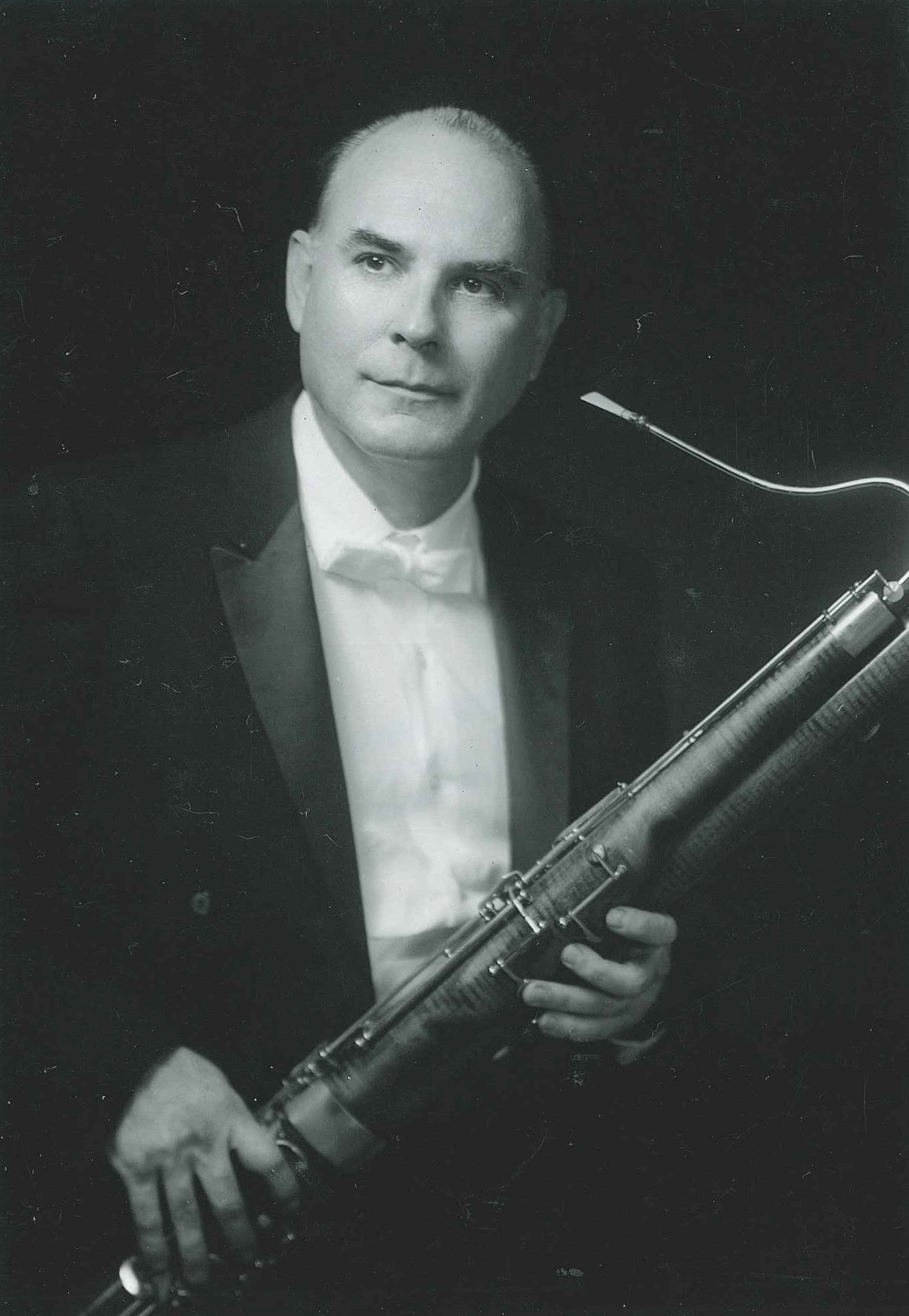
- Elliot in 1970

Background information
- Born: July 18, 1926; Fort Worth, Texas
- Died: 18 July 2000 (aged 74) Fort Worth, Texas
- Genre: Orchestral
- Occupations: Classical musician; professor
- Instrument: Bassoon
- Years active: 1950-1994

Willard Somers Elliot (July 18, 1926 – June 7, 2000, in Fort Worth, Texas) was an American bassoonist and composer. He was best known for his long tenure as principal bassoon of the Chicago Symphony Orchestra from 1964-1997.

== Life and career ==
Elliot was born in Fort Worth, Texas and attended the University of North Texas in Denton where he studied bassoon with Sanford Sharoff. He went on to pursue graduate studies with Vincent Pezzi at the Eastman School of Music. While at Eastman, he also studied composition with Bernard Rogers. Elliot was a bassoonist with the Houston Symphony Orchestra (1946–1949), the Dallas Symphony Orchestra (1951–1956), principal bassoonist with the Dallas Symphony Orchestra (1956–1964), and principal bassoonist with the Chicago Symphony Orchestra (1964–1997). Elliot composed and twice performed his Concerto for Bassoon and Orchestra with the Chicago Symphony Orchestra under conductors Seiji Ozawa and Jean Martinon.

During his 32 uninterrupted years as principal bassoon of the Chicago Symphony, Elliot performed as a soloist under Sir Georg Solti, Seiji Ozawa, Jean Martinon, Antonio Janigro, Carlo Maria Giulini, Morton Gould, Lawrence Foster, and Claudio Abbado. He recorded the Mozart Bassoon Concerto for Deutsche Grammophon conducted by Claudio Abbado.

Elliot was also a member of the Chicago Symphony Chamber Wind Players, Chicago Symphony Winds and the Chicago Pro Musica, which won a Grammy Award in 1986 for the Best New Classical Artist. Elliot performed on Heckel bassoon #7416 for the majority of his career, occasionally playing other 9000 series Heckel bassoons such as #9890.

== Selected compositions ==
- Symphony No. 2
- Elegy for Bassoon and Orchestra, premiered December 7, 1959, Dallas Symphony Orchestra, Paul Kletzki conductor
- Quetzalcoatl, a tone poem
- Night Piece for Small Orchestra
- Concerto for Two Bassoons and Orchestra
- Concerto for bassoon and orchestra (1965)
- 3 Duets for flute and bassoon
- Six 15th-Century French Songs for oboe, bassoon, and piano (1978)
- Poem for bassoon and string quartet
- Quintet for bassoon and strings
- Two Metamorphoses for solo bassoon, string quartet, and wind quartet
- Six Portuguese Songs for bassoon and piano
- Six Portuguese Folk Songs for bassoon solo and orchestra (1990)
- Elegy for Orchestra (1960) (Kousevitzky award (1961)
- Snake Charmer, for alto flute and orchestra (1975)
- Five Impressions for Wind Octet (1981)
- Fantasy, for piccolo and piano (1978)
- Five short pieces for oboe and piano (1986)
- Four lyric pieces for wind octet, Edvard Grieg, arranged by Willard Elliot (1986)
- Ma mere l'Oye cinq pieces enfantines, Maurice Ravel, arranged for flute, oboe, clarinet, bassoon, horn, violin, viola, violoncello, and bass by Willard Elliot (1988)
- March from Turandot, Carl Maria von Weber, arranged for wind octet (2 oboes, 2 clarinets, 2 horns, 2 bassoons) by Willard Elliot (1986)
- Peter Schmoll ouverture, Carl Maria von Weber, arranged for wind octet by Willard Elliot (1986)
- Quartet in B-flat, for bassoon, violin, viola, and violoncello, Mozart, adapted by Willard Elliot (1986)
- Quejas o la maja y el ruisenor (Lament of the maja and the nightingale), from Goyescas, for wind octet: 2 oboes, 2 clarinets, 2 horns, 2 bassoons Granados, arranged Willard Elliot (1986)
- Scriabiniana, suite of selected piano works, Alexander Scriabin, arranged for flute, oboe, clarinet, bassoon, horn, violin, viola, violoncello, and bass by Willard Elliot (1991)
- Septet, for flute, oboe, clarinet, bassoon, horn, trumpet, and tuba, Willard Elliot (1987)
- Septet, for oboe, bassoon, horn, two violins, violoncello, and bass, Glinka, new revision by Willard Elliot (1988)
- Seven preludes for clarinet and piano, Alexander Scriabin, arranged by Willard Elliot (1986)
- Silhouettes (from impressions), for soprano, bassoon, and piano, by Willard Elliot (1991)
- Six Portuguese folk songs, for bassoon and piano, Willard Elliot (1988)
- Tears, Idle Tears, for soprano, bassoon, and piano, by Willard Elliot (1990)
- Two sketches, for woodwind quintet (1986)
- Valse, Opus 38, for flute, clarinet, bassoon, and piano Alexander Scriabin, arranged by Willard Elliot (1986)
- Evolutions, for two contra bassoons (premiered Aug 10, 1999, International Double Reed Society Annual Conference)

Most of the above compositions were published by Bruyere Music Publishers, a firm that Willard and his wife, Patricia Bills, founded in 1986 to publish and popularize his compositions and arrangements.

== Other positions ==
- 1949–1952, Bassoon Instructor, University of North Texas College of Music
- 1973–1976, Faculty, DePaul University
- 1979–1984, Faculty, Northwestern University
- 1997–2000, Faculty, Texas Christian University

== Awards ==
- 1947 – Winner, National Federation of Music Clubs Composition Contest
- 1961 – Co-winner of the Koussevitsky Foundation Award, Elegy for Orchestra, performed by the Dallas Symphony Orchestra, Paul Kletzki conducting
- 1986 – Chicago Pro Musica received a Grammy Award for Best New Classical Artist at the 28th Grammy Awards

== Selected discography ==
- Chicago Pro Musica, The Medinah Sessions
1. Kurt Weill, Suite from The Three-Penny Opera (recorded June 1988)
2. Sir William Walton, Facade Suite (recorded August 1983)
3. Richard Strauss, Hasenöhrl, Till Eulenspiegel's Merry Pranks (recorded August 1983)
4. Igor Stravinsky, The Soldier's Tale – Suite (recorded August 1983)
5. Paul Bowles, Music for a Farce (recorded June 1988)
6. Bohuslav Martinů, La Revue de Cuisine (recorded June 1988)
7. Alexander Scriabin, Willard Elliot, Waltz in A-flat major, Opus 38 (recorded August 1983)
8. Carl Nielsen, Serenata in vano (recorded August 1983)
9. Edgard Varèse, Octandre (recorded June 1988)
10. Rimsky-Korsakov, Easily Blackwood, Capriccio Espagnol (recorded August 1983)

Recorded August 1983 and June 1988 at Medinah Temple, Ohio Street, Chicago (the 1983 sessions were issued two years later on a pair of discs)
The 1983 session was re-packaged with the 1988 session and re-released as an audiophile recording (analogue to HDCD) in 2001 on two CDs by the Reference Recordings
