= Jingle (percussion) =

Musical instrument

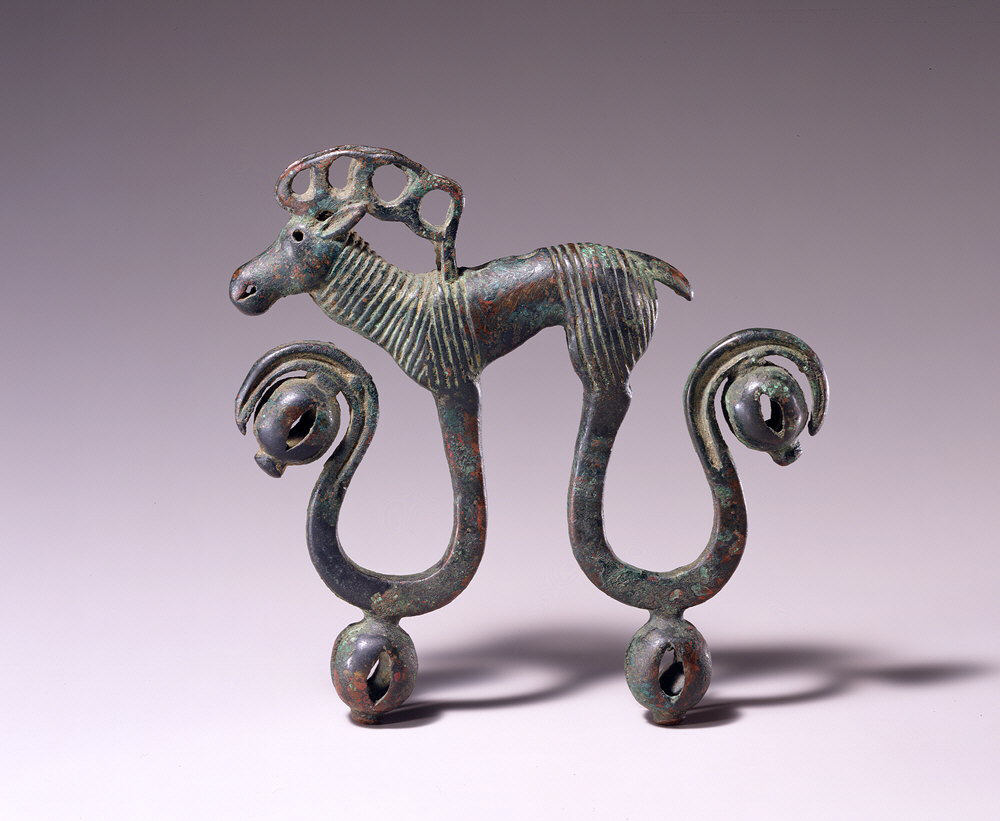
Chinese harness jingle, 7th–6th century BC

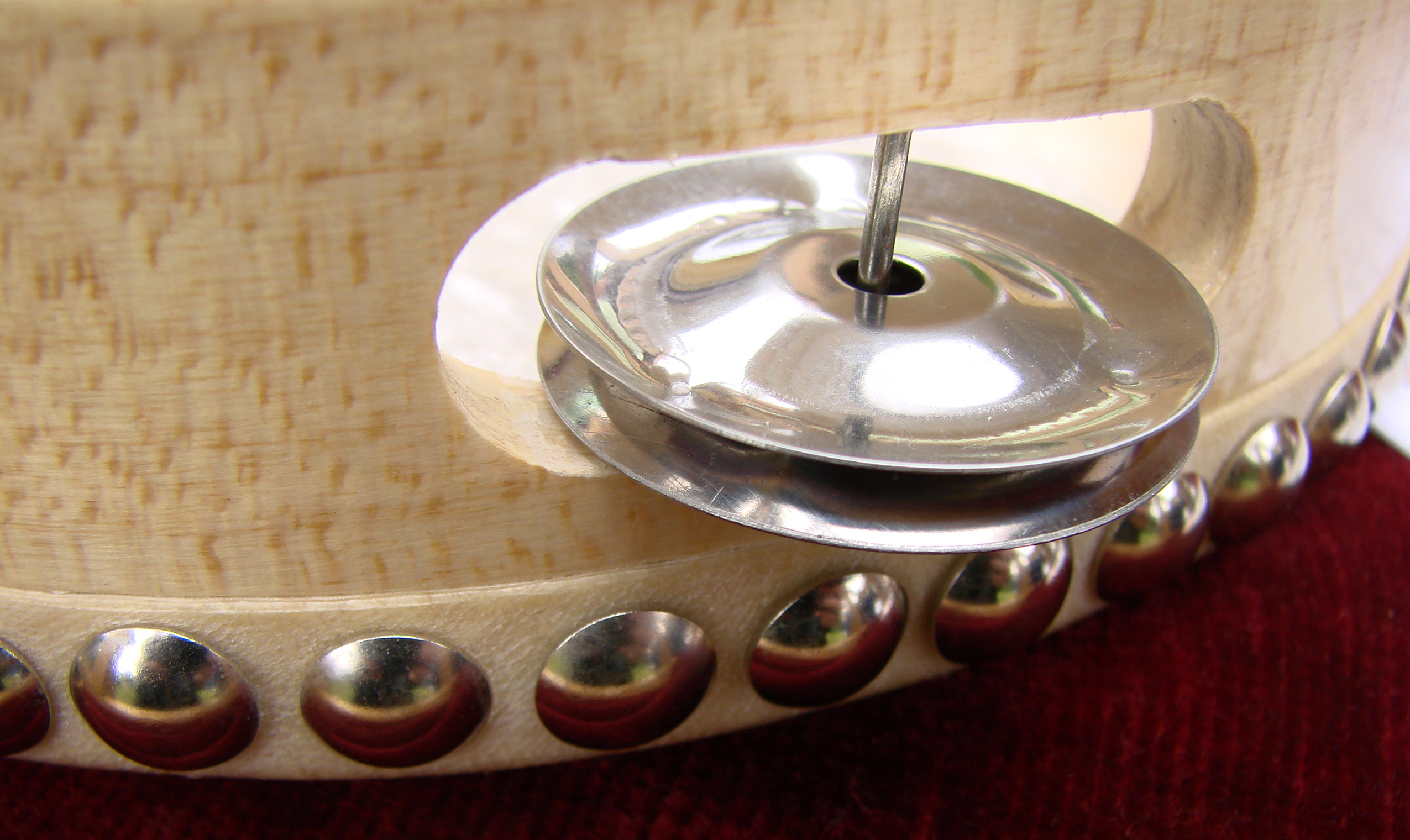
Tambourine disc jingle

In percussion, a jingle is one of a cluster of small bells, shaken or tapped on the palm of the player's hand. The small metal discs arranged around the frame of a tambourine are also called "jingles". In the Hornbostel–Sachs instrument-classification system, they are described as "shaken idiophones". Jingles were often found in ancient times as harness ornaments suspended from the trappings of horses, mules, and camels (Blades and Holland 2001).

That term is referenced in Bob Dylan's hit song, "Mr. Tambourine Man". It is an onomatopoeic term, often used together with jangle. An example of that usage is found in the Frank Loesser song "Jingle Jangle Jingle".

== See also ==
- Jingle bell
