= André Watts =

American pianist (1946–2023)

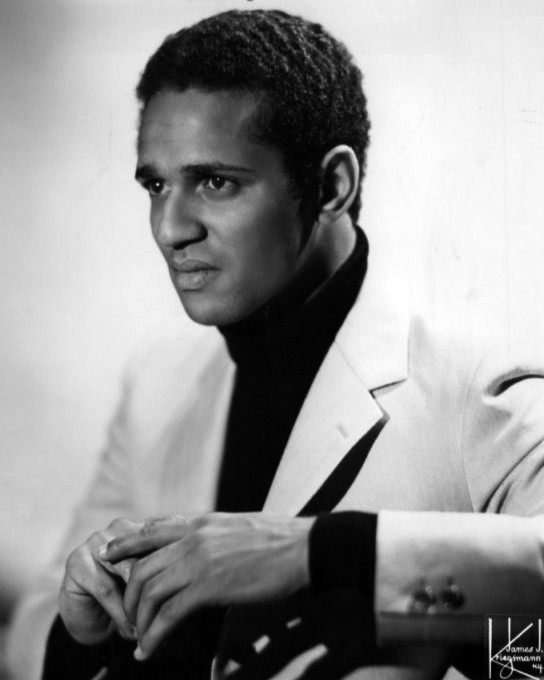
- Watts in 1971
- Born: June 20, 1946; Nuremberg, Allied-occupied Germany
- Died: July 12, 2023 (aged 77); Bloomington, Indiana, U.S.
- Education: Peabody Institute
- Occupations: Pianist; professor
- Spouse: Joan Brand
- Children: 2 (stepchildren)
- Website: cmartists.com/artists/andre-watts.htm

External audio
- André Watts performing Ludwig van Beethoven's Piano Concerto No. 4 Op. 58 with William Steinberg conducting the Boston Symphony Orchestra in 1970

André Watts (June 20, 1946 – July 12, 2023) was an American classical pianist. Over the six decades of his career, Watts performed as soloist with every major American orchestra and most of the world's finest orchestras, including the New York Philharmonic, National Symphony Orchestra, and London Symphony Orchestra. Watts recorded a variety of repertoire, concentrating on Romantic era composers such as Frédéric Chopin and Franz Liszt, but also including George Gershwin. In 2020, he was elected to the American Philosophical Society. He won a Grammy Award for Best New Classical Artist in 1964. Watts was also on the faculty at the Jacobs School of Music of Indiana University.

== Early life ==
Born in Nuremberg, Allied-occupied Germany, Watts was the son of a Hungarian mother, Maria Alexandra Gusmits, a pianist; and an American father, Herman Watts, a U.S. Army non-commissioned officer. André spent his early childhood in Europe, living mostly near army posts where his father was stationed.

Watts began to study the violin when he was four. By six he decided the piano was his instrument. When André was eight years old, Herman's military assignment brought the family to the United States. They settled in Philadelphia, Pennsylvania. His mother started him with his first piano lessons. As do many children, Watts disliked practicing. For encouragement, his mother would tell stories of the great pianist and composer Franz Liszt, making it clear that Liszt practiced faithfully. Watts found inspiration in Liszt, adopting his theatrical playing style.

At age ten, Watts performed Mendelssohn's G minor concerto at the Robin Hood Dell outdoor amphitheater, where the Philadelphia Orchestra had given summer performances (from 1933 through 1975), and at fourteen, Franck's Symphonic Variations, again with the Philadelphia Orchestra.

After the divorce of his parents in 1959, Watts remained with his mother, who supported them by working as a secretary and later as a receptionist.

Watts enrolled at the Philadelphia Musical Academy (now a part of the University of the Arts), where he studied with Genia Robinor, Doris Bawden, and Clement Petrillo, graduating in June 1963. He entered his first competition at nine, with forty other children, for the opportunity to perform with the Philadelphia Orchestra Children's Concerts. Watts won the competition playing the first movement of Joseph Haydn's Piano Concerto in D.

== Career ==
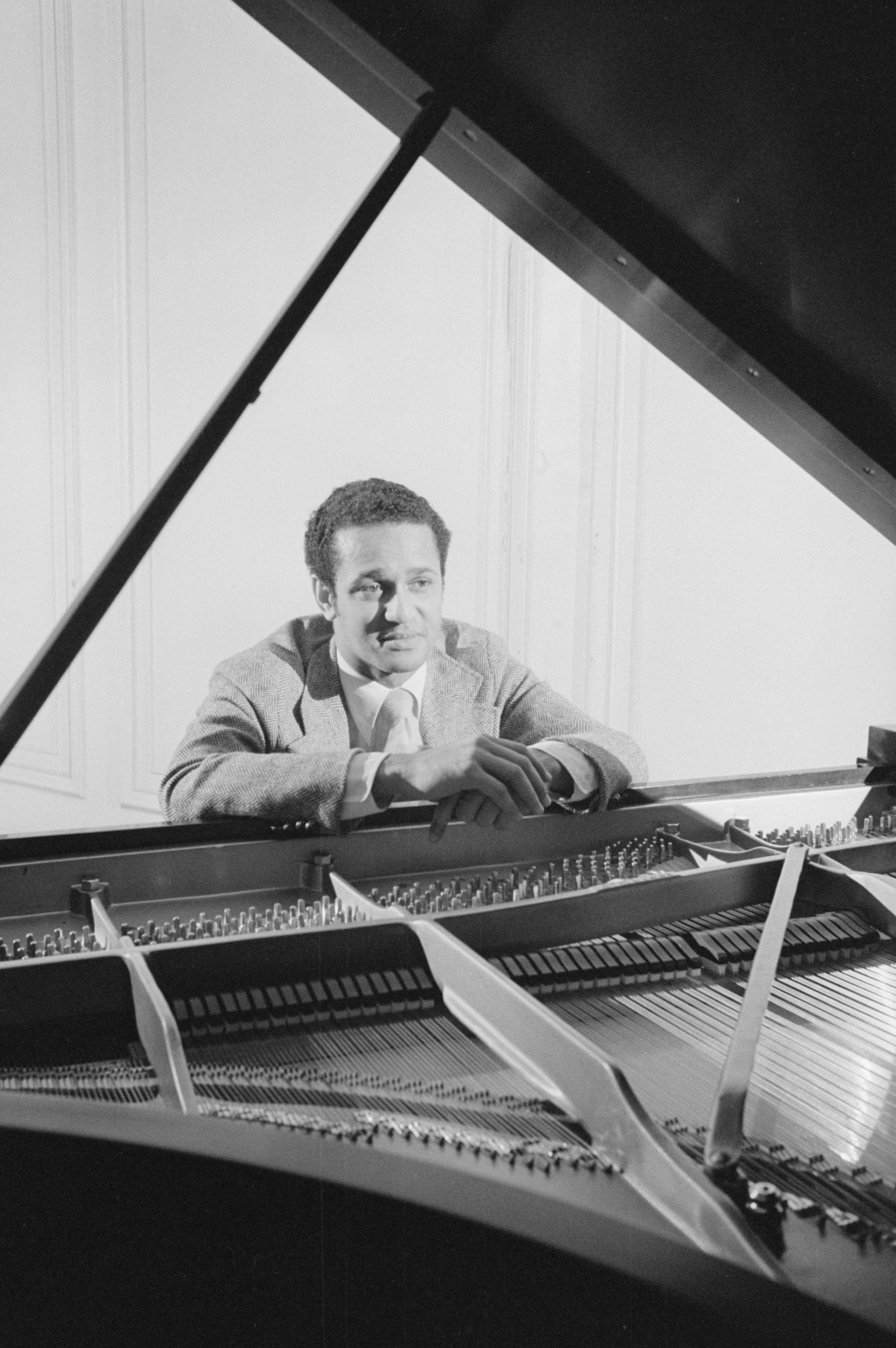
Andre Watts at a piano in 1975

At sixteen, Watts auditioned at Carnegie Recital Hall in a competition to play in conductor Leonard Bernstein's televised Young People's Concert series with the New York Philharmonic. Watts' performance of the Liszt Piano Concerto No. 1 in E-flat at a Young People's Concert on January 12, 1963, was videotaped and nationally televised on CBS on January 15, 1963. Before the concert, Bernstein introduced Watts to the national television audience, stating that he "flipped" when he first heard Watts play.

On January 31, 1963, Bernstein asked the 16-year-old Watts to fill in for the ailing Glenn Gould, the scheduled soloist for the New York Philharmonic's regular subscription concert. Watts again played the Liszt E-flat Concerto. At its conclusion, the orchestra joined the audience in a thundrous standing ovation. Watts' first LP, The Exciting Debut of André Watts, was shortly thereafter released on Columbia Masterworks records and included the Liszt Concerto with Bernstein and the Philharmonic.

Following graduation, Watts enrolled at the Peabody Institute in Baltimore, where he studied part-time for a Bachelor of Music degree with pianist Leon Fleisher. The following year, he appeared at New York City's Lewisohn Stadium with conductor Seiji Ozawa, and the New York Philharmonic, performing Camille Saint-Saëns' Concerto No. 2 in G minor. In September 1963, he again performed the Liszt concerto at the Hollywood Bowl in Los Angeles. He opened the 1964–65 season of the National Symphony Orchestra in Washington, D.C., again performing the Saint-Saëns concerto. He returned to New York in January 1965 to perform Chopin's Concerto No. 2 in F minor. Watts made his European debut in a London performance with the London Symphony Orchestra in June 1966.

By 1969, he was on a full-scale concert schedule, booked three years in advance. Watts made his Boston debut in 1969 for the Peabody Mason Concert series. He graduated from the Peabody Institute in 1972. He signed a long-term exclusive contract with Columbia Masterworks Records on his 21st birthday. The contract ended in 1977.

In February 1973, Watts was selected as Musical America's Musician of the Month. His other honors and awards included doctor honoris causa degrees from Albright College and Yale University, the Order of Zaire, a University of the Arts Medal from the University of the Arts in Philadelphia, and the National Medal of Arts.

By the mid-1970s, Watts was giving 150 concerts, recitals, and chamber performances per season, performing about eight months out of the year. In 1976, at age thirty, he celebrated his tenth consecutive appearance in the Lincoln Center Great Performers Series at Avery Fisher Hall. The PBS Sunday afternoon telecast was the first solo recital presented on Live from Lincoln Center and the first full-length recital to be aired nationally in prime time.

In 1985, he signed a recording contract with EMI, with whom he recorded until the early 1990s. He also recorded for Telarc.

In November 2002, Watts suffered a subdural hematoma and underwent emergency surgery. In 2004, he also had surgery for a ruptured disc which was affecting the use of his left hand. He continued performing regularly after recovering from the aforementioned surgeries.

In 2004, Watts joined the faculty at Indiana University, where he held the Jack I. and Dora B. Hamlin Endowed Chair in Music.

In 2019, Watts underwent surgery for a nerve injury to his left hand resulting in the cancellation of several performances. He reworked the Ravel Concerto for Left Hand to perform with his right hand and was planning to perform the work with the Detroit and Atlanta Symphony Orchestras. Ultimately, however, he was unable to perform the concerto due to the pandemic and continuing health issues.

== Personal life and death ==
Watts was married to Joan Brand, had two stepchildren, and had seven step-grandchildren. He was diagnosed with prostate cancer in July 2016, and died of the disease at home in Bloomington, Indiana, on July 12, 2023, at age 77.

== Awards and recognitions ==
- 1964 Most Promising New Classical Recording Artist
- 1973 Honorary Doctorate, Yale University
- 1975 Honorary Doctorate, Albright College
- 1984 Distinguished Alumni Award, Peabody Institute of Johns Hopkins University
- 1988 Avery Fisher Prize
- 1988 University of the Arts Medal, Philadelphia
- 2011 National Medal of Arts
- 2013 American Classical Music Hall of Fame
- 2014 Cincinnati MacDowell Society's MacDowell Medal
- 2018 The Luise Vosgerchian Teaching Award from Harvard
- 2020 Elected to the American Philosophical Society
- 2021 Honorary Doctorate, Boston Conservatory at Berklee
- 2022 American Liszt Society Medal
