= 28th Annual Grammy Awards =

1986 US music awards ceremony

- Date: February 25, 1986
- Location: Shrine Auditorium, Los Angeles
- Hosted by: Kenny Rogers
- Most awards: USA for Africa (4)
- Most nominations: Dire Straits (8)

Television/radio coverage
- Network: CBS

The 28th Annual Grammy Awards were held on February 25, 1986, at Shrine Auditorium, Los Angeles. They recognized accomplishments by musicians from the previous year, 1985. The night's big winner was USA for Africa's "We Are the World", which won four awards, including Song of the Year which went to Michael Jackson and Lionel Richie. It marked the first time in their respective careers that they received the Song of the Year Award. For Richie, it was his sixth attempt in eight years. The other three awards (including Record of the Year) for the latter single were given to the song's producer, Quincy Jones.

Another big winner was Phil Collins, whose No Jacket Required LP amassed three wins: Album of the Year (alongside Hugh Padgham), Producer of the Year and Best Pop Vocal (Male). The Manhattan Transfer also won three awards, including two for the song "Another Night in Tunisia" (performed and arranged on the album by guest vocalists Jon Hendricks and Bobby McFerrin).

Stevie Wonder won his first Grammy in nine years for his album In Square Circle, after winning fifteen awards in the mid-1970s. While songwriter Jimmy Webb won him his first Grammy in 17 years for his song "Highwayman" (after 1969's Up, Up and Away). Orchestrator and arranger Nelson Riddle, posthumously won for his arrangements on Linda Ronstadt's album Lush Life. There was one new category, Best Polka Recording. It would run until 2009.

== Controversy ==
There were a number of remarkable wins in the classical field. The Atlanta Symphony Orchestra's recording of Berlioz: Requiem won three awards, while a different recording by the same orchestra won the Best Orchestral Performance award. These four wins were the result of an unusually large number of nominations for the orchestra (12 in total), including four in the Best Classical Album category which normally holds five nominees (the Recording Academy decided to add a number of nominations to this list to lessen the domination of the Atlanta Symphony Orchestra in this category).

Several sources from the American classical community – including record labels – expressed their dismay with the situation, suggesting that this was the result of many members of the orchestra and other associates joining the Recording Academy in force to be able to vote on nominations and Grammy winners. Despite the controversy, the orchestra's conductor Robert Shaw and their album producer (and record label owner) Robert Woods won three Grammys each.

== Performers ==
Artist(s)	Song(s)
Sting	"Russians"
Whitney Houston	"Saving All My Love for You"
Starship	"We Built This City"
Ronnie Milsap; The Five Satins; Carl Perkins; Huey Lewis and the News	Medley: "Lost in the Fifties Tonight (In the Still of the Night)" "Blue Suede Shoes" "Flip, Flop and Fly"
Phil Collins	"Sussudio"
Stevie Wonder	"Part-Time Lover"
A-ha	"Take On Me"
B. B. King; Tony Williams; Stanley Clarke; Ron Carter; Michel Petrucciani; Herbie Hancock; Kenny Burrell; Stanley Jordan; Bobby Hutcherson; Gary Burton; Jon Faddis; Dizzy Gillespie; Gerry Mulligan; David Sanborn; Buddy Rich; Sarah Vaughan; Diane Schuur; Bobby McFerrin; Joe Williams; The Manhattan Transfer	"Groovin' High" "How High the Moon"
Christopher Parkening	Tribute to Andrés Segovia "Canarios" by Gaspar Sanz
Huey Lewis and the News	"The Power of Love"

== Presenters ==
- Linda Rondstadt & James Taylor - Best Pop Vocal Performance Male
- Dionne Warwick & Julian Lennon - Best Pop Vocal Performance Female
- Sheena Easton & Nick Rhodes - Song of the Year
- Little Steven & Richard Page (musician) - Best Rock Vocal Performance Duo or Group
- Barbra Streisand - Presents George and Ira Gershwin as the Trustees Recipient
- Roger Miller & Martin Mull - Best Comedy Recording
- Reba McEntire & Kris Kristofferson - Best Country Solo Performance Male
- Quincy Jones - Introduces the Grammy Hall of Fame Inductees
- Grace Slick & Kenny Loggins - Album of the Year
- Kim Carnes & Luther Vandross - Producer of the Year
- Eric Clapton - Presented the Rolling Stones with the Lifetime Achievement Award
- Gladys Knight & El DeBarge - Best R&B Vocal Performance Male
- Herb Alpert & Ruben Blades - Best Latin Pop Performance
- Whoopi Goldberg & Billy Crystal - Best New Artist
- Edwin Hawkins & James Blackwood - Best Gospel Performance Duo or Group
- Maxine Sullivan & Toshiko Akiyoshi - Best Jazz Vocal Performance
- Roberta Flack & Emmylou Harris - Announces winners earlier
- Phil Collins & Sting - Record of the Year

== Award winners ==
Record of the Year

- "We Are the World" – USA for Africa
  - Quincy Jones, producers
- "Money for Nothing" – Dire Straits
  - Neil Dorfsman & Mark Knopfler, producers
- "The Boys of Summer" – Don Henley
  - Don Henley, Danny Kortchmar, Greg Ladanyi & Mike Campbell, producers
- "The Power of Love" – Huey Lewis and the News
  - Huey Lewis and the News, producers
- "Born in the U.S.A." – Bruce Springsteen
  - Jon Landau, Chuck Plotkin, Little Steven & Bruce Springsteen, producers

Album of the Year

- No Jacket Required – Phil Collins
  - Hugh Padgham & Phil Collins, producers
- Brothers in Arms – Dire Straits
  - Neil Dorfsman & Mark Knopfler, producers
- Whitney Houston – Whitney Houston
  - Jermaine Jackson, Kashif, Michael Masser & Narada Michael Walden, producers
- The Dream of the Blue Turtles – Sting
  - Sting & Rick Chertoff, producers
- We Are the World – USA for Africa
  - Quincy Jones, producer

Song of the Year

- "We Are the World"
  - Michael Jackson & Lionel Richie, songwriters (USA for Africa)
- "Money for Nothing"
  - Mark Knopfler & Sting, songwriters (Dire Straits)
- "The Boys of Summer"
  - Don Henley & Mike Campbell, songwriters (Don Henley)
- "Everytime You Go Away"
  - Daryl Hall, songwriter (Paul Young)
- "I Want to Know What Love Is"
  - Mick Jones, songwriter (Foreigner)

Best New Artist

- Sade
- A-ha
- Freddie Jackson
- Katrina and the Waves
- Julian Lennon

=== Blues ===
Best Traditional Blues Recording

- "My Guitar Sings the Blues" – B. B. King

=== Children's ===
- Best Recording for Children
  - Jim Henson & Steve Buckingham (producers) for Follow That Bird – Original Motion Picture Soundtrack performed by the Sesame Street cast

=== Classical ===
- Best Classical Orchestral Recording
  - Robert Woods (producer), Robert Shaw (conductor) & the Atlanta Symphony Orchestra for Fauré: Pelleas et Melisande
- Best Classical Vocal Soloist Performance
  - Robert Shaw (conductor), John Aler & the Atlanta Symphony Orchestra for Berlioz: Requiem
- Best Opera Recording
  - James Mallinson (producer), Georg Solti (conductor), Philip Langridge, Franz Mazura & the Chicago Symphony Orchestra & Chorus for Schoenberg: Moses und Aron
- Best Choral Performance (other than opera)
  - Robert Shaw (conductor) & the Atlanta Symphony Orchestra & Chorus for Berlioz: Requiem
- Best Classical Performance – Instrumental Soloist or Soloists (with orchestra)
  - André Previn (conductor), Yo-Yo Ma & the London Symphony Orchestra for Elgar: Cello Concerto, Op. 85/Walton: Concerto for Cello & Orchestra
- Best Classical Performance – Instrumental Soloist or Soloists (without orchestra)
  - Vladimir Ashkenazy for Ravel: Gaspard de la Nuit; Pavane Pour Une Infante Defunte; Valses Nobles et Sentimentales
- Best Chamber Music Performance
  - Emanuel Ax & Yo-Yo Ma for Brahms: Cello and Piano Sonatas in E Minor and F
- Best Classical Contemporary Composition
  - Andrew Lloyd Webber (composer), Sarah Brightman & Plácido Domingo for Lloyd Webber: Requiem
- Best Classical Album
  - Robert Woods (producer), Robert Shaw (conductor), John Aler & the Atlanta Symphony Orchestra & Chorus for Berlioz: Requiem
- Best New Classical Artist
  - Chicago Pro Musica

=== Comedy ===
- Best Comedy Recording
  - Whoopi Goldberg for Whoopi Goldberg – Original Broadway Show Recording

=== Composing and arranging ===
- Best Instrumental Composition
  - Jan Hammer (composer) for "Miami Vice Theme"
- Best Album of Original Score Written for a Motion Picture or a Television Special
  - Marc Benno, Harold Faltermeyer, Keith Forsey, Micki Free, Jon Gilutin, David "Hawk" Wolinski, Howard Hewett, Bunny Hull, Howie Rice, Sharon Robinson, Dan Sembello, Sue Sheridan, Richard C. Theisen II & Allee Willis (composers) for Beverly Hills Cop performed by various artists
- Best Arrangement on an Instrumental
  - Dave Grusin & Lee Ritenour (arrangers) for "Early A.M. Attitude"
- Best Instrumental Arrangement Accompanying Vocalist(s)
  - Nelson Riddle (arranger) for "Lush Life" performed by Linda Ronstadt
- Best Vocal Arrangement for Two or More Voices
  - Bobby McFerrin & Cheryl Bentyne (arrangers) for "Another Night in Tunisia" performed by The Manhattan Transfer

=== Country ===
- Best Country Vocal Performance, Female
  - Rosanne Cash for "I Don't Know Why You Don't Want Me"
- Best Country Vocal Performance, Male
  - Ronnie Milsap for "Lost in the Fifties Tonight (In the Still of the Night)"
- Best Country Performance by a Duo or Group with Vocal
  - The Judds for Why Not Me
- Best Country Instrumental Performance (orchestra, group or soloist)
  - Chet Atkins & Mark Knopfler for "Cosmic Square Dance"
- Best Country Song
  - Jimmy L. Webb (songwriter) for "Highwayman" performed by Johnny Cash, Waylon Jennings, Kris Kristofferson & Willie Nelson

=== Folk ===
- Best Ethnic or Traditional Folk Recording
  - Rockin' Sidney for "My Toot Toot"

=== Gospel ===
- Best Gospel Performance, Female
  - Amy Grant for Unguarded
- Best Gospel Performance, Male
  - Larnelle Harris for "How Excellent Is Thy Name"
- Best Gospel Performance by a Duo or Group, Choir or Chorus
  - Larnelle Harris & Sandi Patti for "I've Just Seen Jesus"
- Best Soul Gospel Performance, Female
  - Shirley Caesar for "Martin"
- Best Soul Gospel Performance, Male
  - Marvin Winans for "Bring Back the Days of Yea and Nay"
- Best Soul Gospel Performance by a Duo or Group, Choir or Chorus
  - The Winans for Tomorrow
- Best Inspirational Performance
  - Jennifer Holliday for "Come Sunday"

=== Historical ===
- Best Historical Album
  - John Pfeiffer (producer) for RCA/Met – 100 Singers – 100 Years performed by various artists

=== Jazz ===
- Best Jazz Vocal Performance, Female
  - Cleo Laine for Cleo at Carnegie – The 10th Anniversary Concert
- Best Jazz Vocal Performance, Male
  - Bobby McFerrin & Jon Hendricks for "Another Night in Tunisia"
- Best Jazz Vocal Performance, Duo or Group
  - The Manhattan Transfer for Vocalese
- Best Jazz Instrumental Performance, Soloist
  - Wynton Marsalis for Black Codes From the Underground
- Best Jazz Instrumental Performance, Group
  - Wynton Marsalis for Black Codes From the Underground performed by the Wynton Marsalis Group
- Best Jazz Instrumental Performance, Big Band
  - Bob Wilber & John Barry for The Cotton Club – Original Motion Picture Soundtrack
- Best Jazz Fusion Performance, Vocal or Instrumental
  - David Sanborn for Straight To The Heart

=== Latin ===
- Best Latin Pop Performance
  - Lani Hall for Es Facil Amar
- Best Tropical Latin Performance
  - Eddie Palmieri for Solito
  - Tito Puente for Mambo Diablo performed by Tito Puente & His Latin Ensemble
- Best Mexican-American Performance
  - Vikki Carr for Simplemente Mujer

=== Musical show ===
- Best Cast Show Album
  - John McClure (producer), José Carreras & Kiri Te Kanawa for West Side Story

=== Music video ===
- Best Music Video, Short Form
  - Tom Trbovich (video director) & Quincy Jones (video producer) for "We Are the World – The Video Event" performed by USA for Africa
- Best Music Video, Long Form
  - Bruce Gowers (video director) & Huey Lewis and the News for Huey Lewis & the News – The Heart of Rock 'n' Roll

=== Packaging and notes ===
- Best Album Package
  - John Kosh & Ron Larson (art directors) for Lush Life performed by Linda Ronstadt
- Best Album Notes
  - Peter Guralnick (notes writer) for Sam Cooke Live at the Harlem Square Club, 1963

=== Polka ===
- Best Polka Recording
  - Frank Yankovic for 70 Years of Hits

=== Pop ===
- Best Pop Vocal Performance, Female
  - Whitney Houston for "Saving All My Love for You"
- Best Pop Vocal Performance, Male
  - Phil Collins for No Jacket Required
- Best Pop Performance by a Duo or Group with Vocal
  - Quincy Jones (producer) for "We Are the World" performed by USA for Africa
- Best Pop Instrumental Performance
  - Jan Hammer for "Miami Vice Theme"

=== Production and engineering ===
- Best Engineered Recording, Non-Classical
  - Neil Dorfsman (engineer) for Brothers in Arms performed by Dire Straits
- Best Engineered Recording, Classical
  - Jack Renner (engineer), Robert Shaw (conductor) & the Atlanta Symphony Orchestra & chorus for Berlioz: Requiem
- Producer of the Year (Non-Classical)
  - Phil Collins & Hugh Padgham
- Classical Producer of the Year
  - Robert Woods

=== R&B ===
- Best R&B Vocal Performance, Female
  - Aretha Franklin for "Freeway of Love"
- Best R&B Vocal Performance, Male
  - Stevie Wonder for In Square Circle
- Best R&B Performance by a Duo or Group with Vocal
  - Commodores for "Nightshift"
- Best R&B Instrumental Performance (Orchestra, Group or Soloist)
  - Ernie Watts for Musician
- Best Rhythm & Blues Song
  - Jeffrey Cohen & Narada Michael Walden (songwriters) for "Freeway of Love" performed by Aretha Franklin

=== Reggae ===
- Best Reggae Recording
  - Jimmy Cliff for Cliff Hanger

=== Rock ===
- Best Rock Vocal Performance, Female
  - Tina Turner for "One Of The Living"
- Best Rock Vocal Performance, Male
  - Don Henley for "The Boys of Summer"
- Best Rock Performance by a Duo or Group with Vocal
  - Dire Straits for "Money for Nothing"
- Best Rock Instrumental Performance
  - Jeff Beck for "Escape"

=== Spoken ===
- Best Spoken Word or Non-musical Recording
  - Mike Berniker (producer) & the original Broadway cast for Ma Rainey's Black Bottom

=== Special awards ===
- President's Merit Award presented by Mike Melvoin
  - Prince
