= Rhythm Tech =

Percussion instrument manufacturer

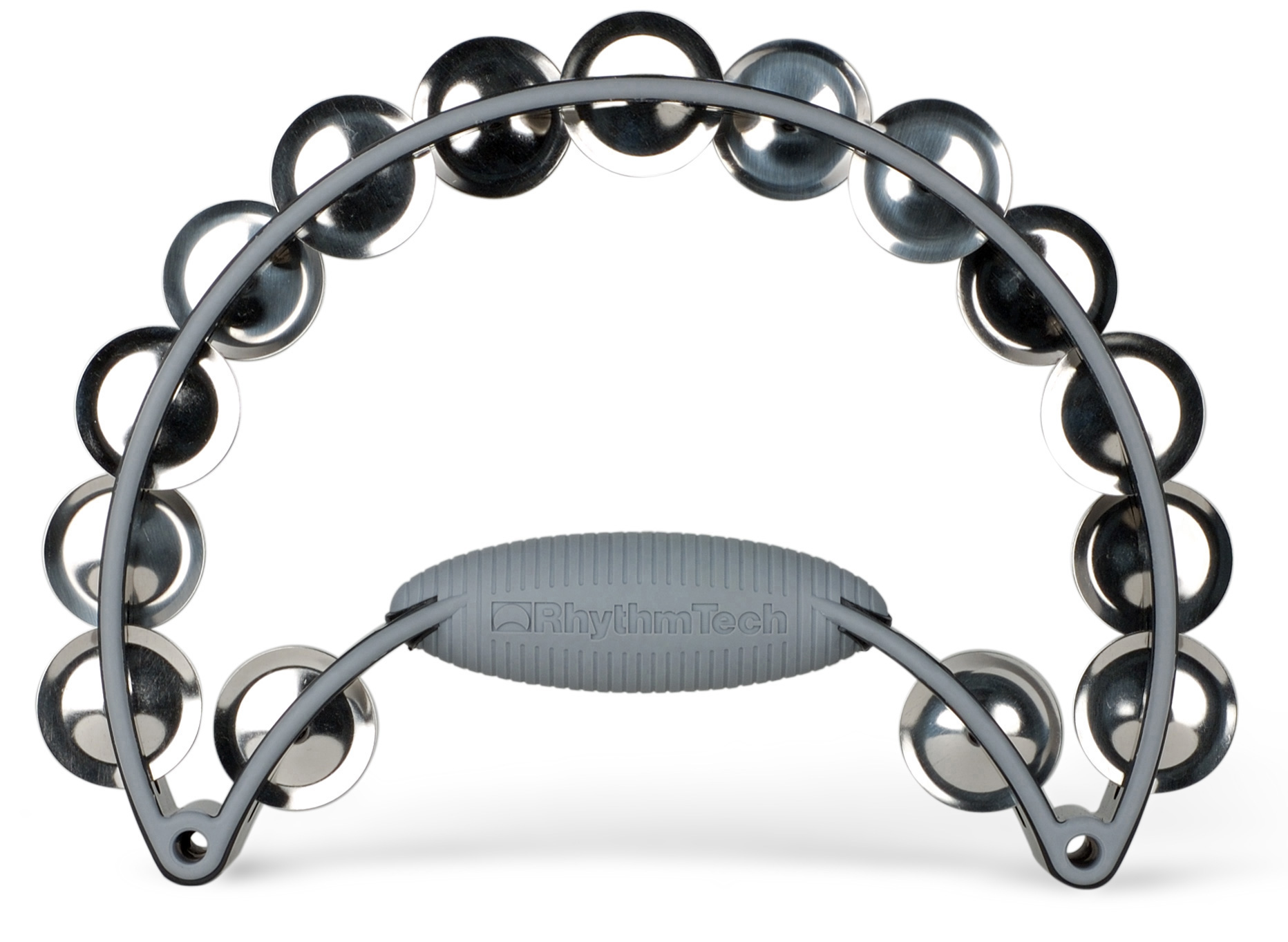
Rhythm Tech crescent tambourine (current version)

Rhythm Tech is a manufacturer of percussion instruments, particularly known for the production of a crescent-shaped tambourine which is now featured in the Museum of Modern Art and which has since spawned many imitators.

The Rhythm Tech tambourine, designed by Richard Taninbaum in 1978, was the company's original product and is still in their catalogue.
