= Judith LeClair =

American bassoonist

- LeClair in 2000

Background information
- Born: 1958 (age 67–68); Parkersburg, West Virginia
- Genre: Orchestral
- Occupations: Classical Musician; Professor
- Instrument: Bassoon
- Years active: 1979-present

Judith LeClair is an American bassoonist and principal bassoon of the New York Philharmonic since 1981. She is widely known as faculty at the Juilliard School since 1983, and for commissioning the bassoon concerto by John Williams, The Five Sacred Trees.

== Life and career ==
LeClair began studying bassoon at age 11 and first performed with a professional orchestra at the age of 15, performing Mozart's Sinfonia Concertante with the Philadelphia Orchestra and students from the Settlement Music School. LeClair's first major bassoon teacher was Shirley Curtiss, one of the first women to teach the instrument in America. She went on to study at the Eastman School of Music as a student of K. David Van Hoesen, where she toured with the Eastman Wind Ensemble. She won the position of principal bassoon with the San Diego Symphony after her graduation from Eastman, and performed with San Diego from 1979 to 1981. In the 1981 New York Philharmonic principal bassoon audition, she was originally denied an audition timeslot. Her teacher K. David Van Hoesen called Philharmonic bassoonist Harold Goltzer to urge him to allow LeClair to audition. Goltzer accepted the recommendation, and LeClair went on to win the audition at the age of 23.

LeClair premiered John Williams's bassoon concerto in April 1995 as part of the New York Philharmonic's 150th anniversary celebration. LeClair has played on Heckel bassoon #8093 for most of her professional career. Her high school music teacher owned #8093 but died in a car crash at a young age. LeClair's parents bought the bassoon from the teacher's estate.

In addition to her orchestral career, LeClair is also an active chamber musician and has taught masterclasses at the worlds leading conservatories. She is married to pianist Jonathan Feldman, who is the former head of the collaborative piano department at Juilliard. They currently reside in Haworth, New Jersey.

== Selected discography ==
- New York Legends (Cala Records, 1997)
- The Five Sacred Trees (Sony Classical, 1997)
- First Chairs: Cantos for Solo Instruments, "Canto XII" (Albany Records, 1998)
