= Tambourine =

Handheld drum with metal jingles

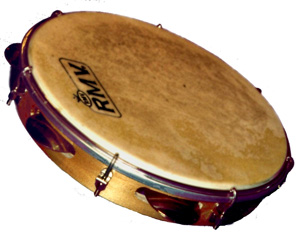

Percussion instrument
- Other names: Riq, Buben
- Classification: Hand percussion
- Hornbostel–Sachs classification: 112.122(+211.311, with drumhead) (Indirectly struck idiophone, sometimes including struck membranophone)

Related instruments
- Riq, Buben, Dayereh, Daf, Kanjira, Frame drum

The tambourine is a musical instrument in the percussion family consisting of a frame, often of wood or plastic, with pairs of small metal jingles, called "zills". Classically the term tambourine denotes an instrument with a drumhead, though some variants may not have a head. Tambourines are often used with regular percussion sets. They can be mounted, for example on a stand as part of a drum kit (and played with drum sticks), or they can be held in the hand and played by tapping, hitting, or shaking the instrument.

Tambourines come in many shapes with the most common being circular. It is found in many forms of music: Albanian folk music, Arabic folk music, Balkan folk music, Israeli folk music, Turkish folk music, Greek folk music, Italian folk music, French folk music, classical music, Spanish folk music, Persian music, samba, gospel music, pop music, country music, and rock music.

== History ==
The origin of the tambourine is unknown, but it appears in historical writings as early as 1700 BC and was used by ancient musicians first in Ancient Egypt, the Ancient Near East and eventually to Greece and other places. The tambourine passed to Europe by way of merchants or musicians. Tambourines were used in ancient Egypt, where they were known as the tof to the Hebrews, who mainly used the instrument in religious contexts. The word tambourine finds its origins in French tambourin, which referred to a long narrow drum used in Provence, the word being a diminutive of tambour "drum," altered by influence of Arabic tunbur "drum". from the Middle Persian word tambūr "lute, drum".

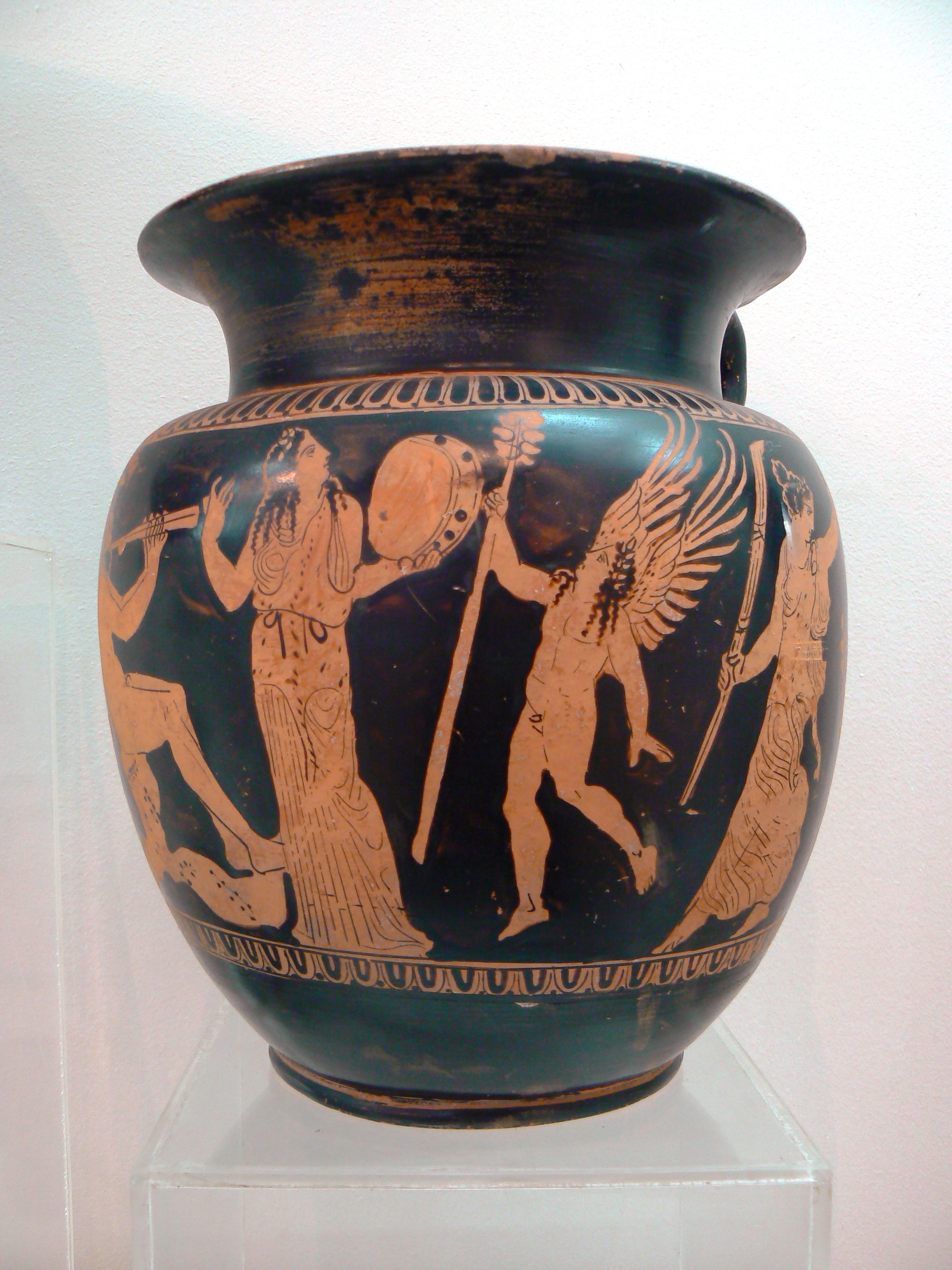
Ancient Greek red-figure pottery depicting a girl playing the tambourine. Bourgas Archaeology Museum

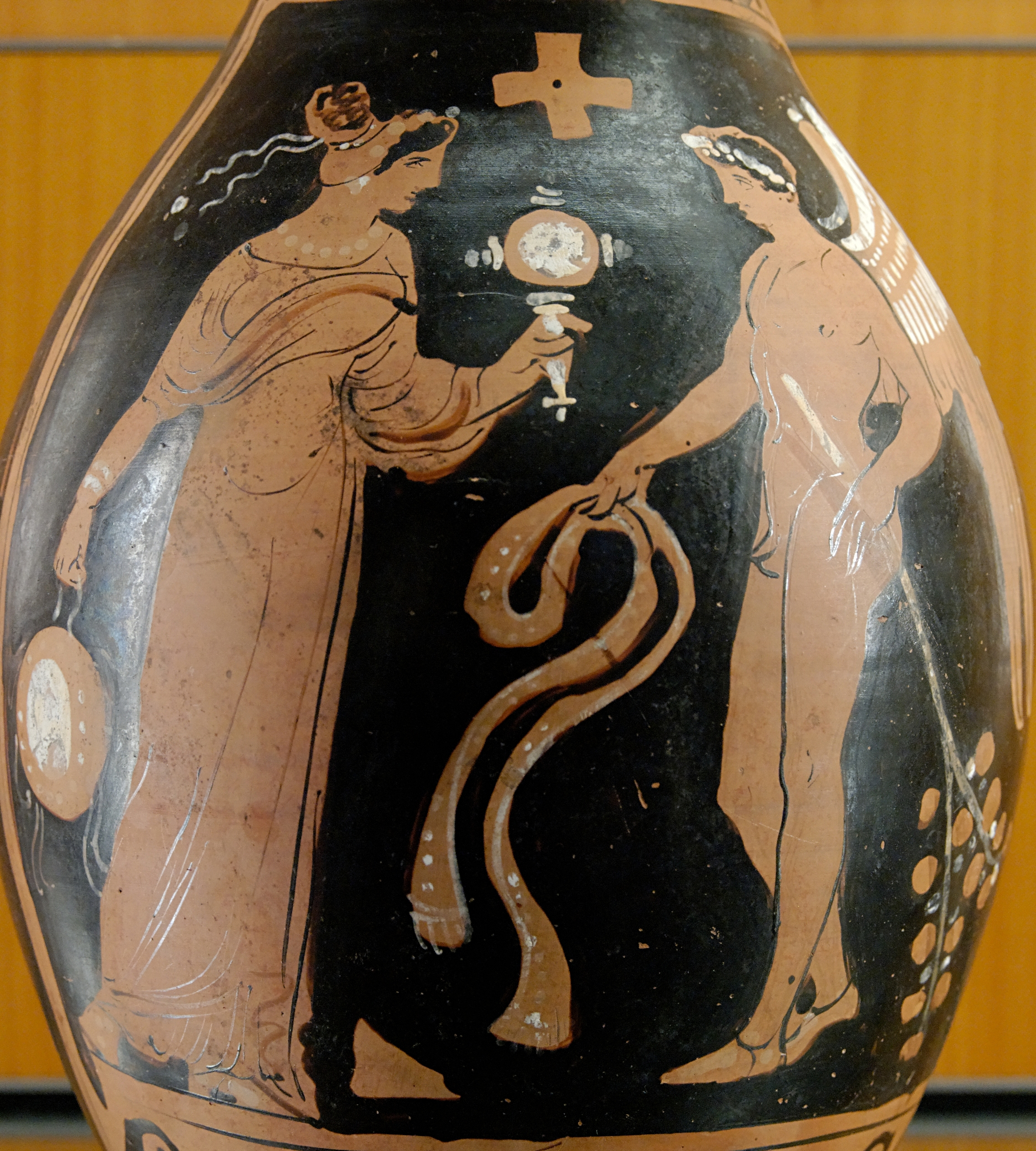
Woman holding a mirror and a tambourine facing a winged genie with a ribbon and a branch with leaves. Ancient Greek red-figure oinochoe, c. 320 BC, from Magna Graecia. (Notice the coloured decorative woven stripes hanging on the tambourine, which can still be seen today on the tamburello, the tambourine of Southern Italy.)

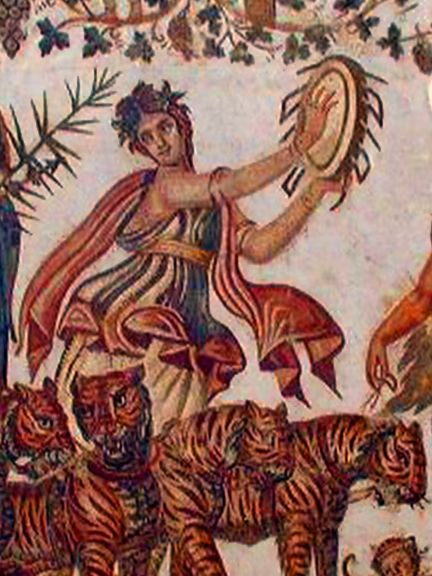
Maenad playing a tympanum. Detail from the Triumph of Dionysus, on a Roman mosaic from Tunisia (3rd century AD).

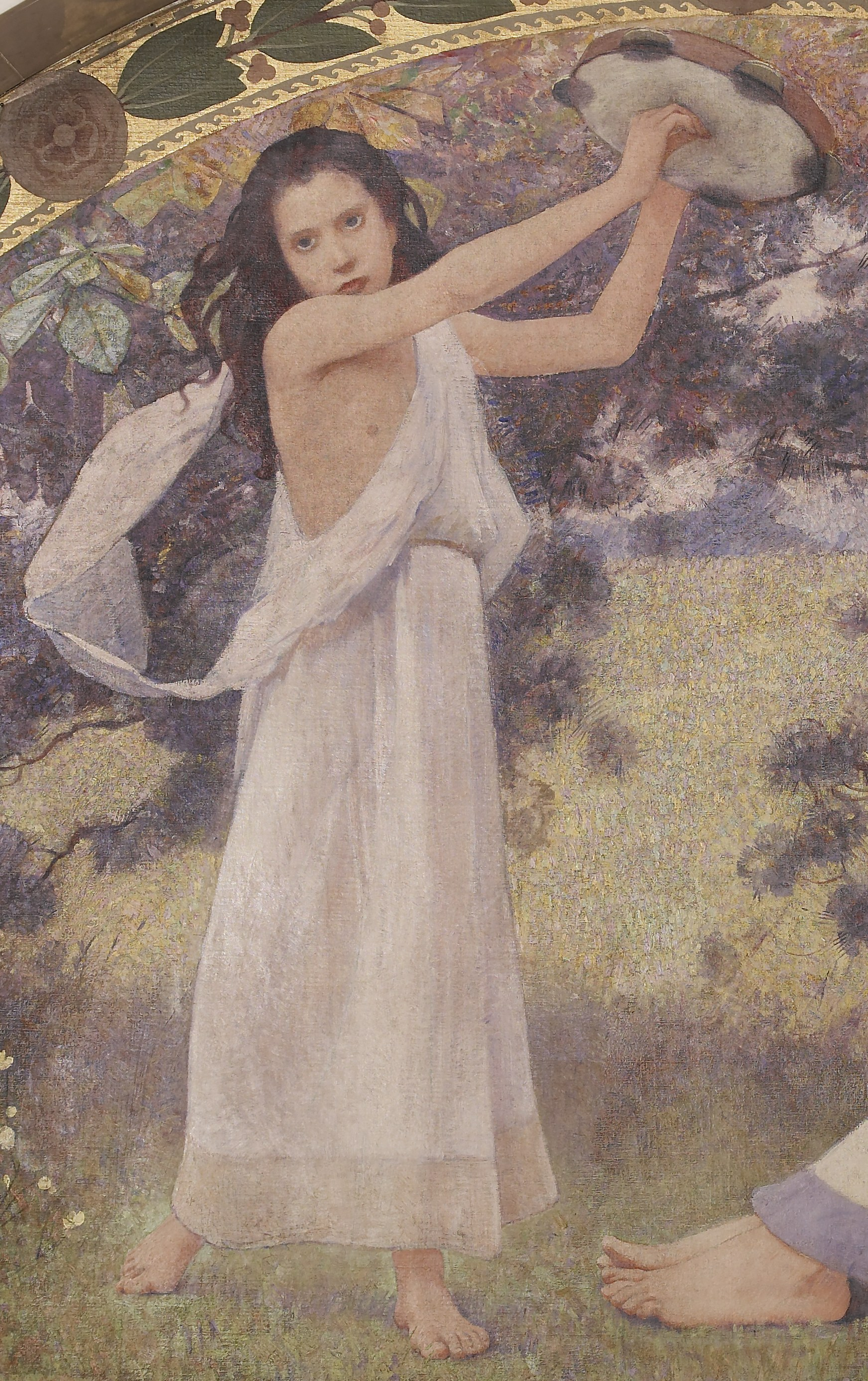
Girl playing a tambourine. Detail from Recreation (1896), by Charles Sprague Pearce. Library of Congress Thomas Jefferson Building, Washington, D.C.

== Playing ==
The tambourine can be held in the hand or mounted on a stand, and can be played in numerous ways, from stroking or shaking the jingles to striking it sharply with the hand or a stick or using the tambourine to strike the leg or hip.

=== Tambourine rolls ===
There are several ways to achieve a tambourine roll. The easiest method is to rapidly rotate the hand holding the tambourine back and forth, pivoting at the wrist.

==== Thumb roll ====
An advanced playing technique is known as the thumb or finger roll. The middle finger or thumb is moved over the skin or rim of the tambourine, producing a fast roll from the jingles on the instrument. The thumb or middle finger of the hand not holding the tambourine is run around the head of the instrument approximately one centimeter from the rim with some pressure applied. If performed correctly, the finger should bounce along the head rapidly, producing the roll. Usually, the end of the roll is articulated using the heel of the hand or another finger. To perform this technique, the percussionist usually lightly licks the tip of their thumb or uses beeswax or rosin. These materials increase friction making it easier to execute. A continuous roll can be achieved by moving the thumb in a "figure of 8" pattern around the head.

== Popular music ==
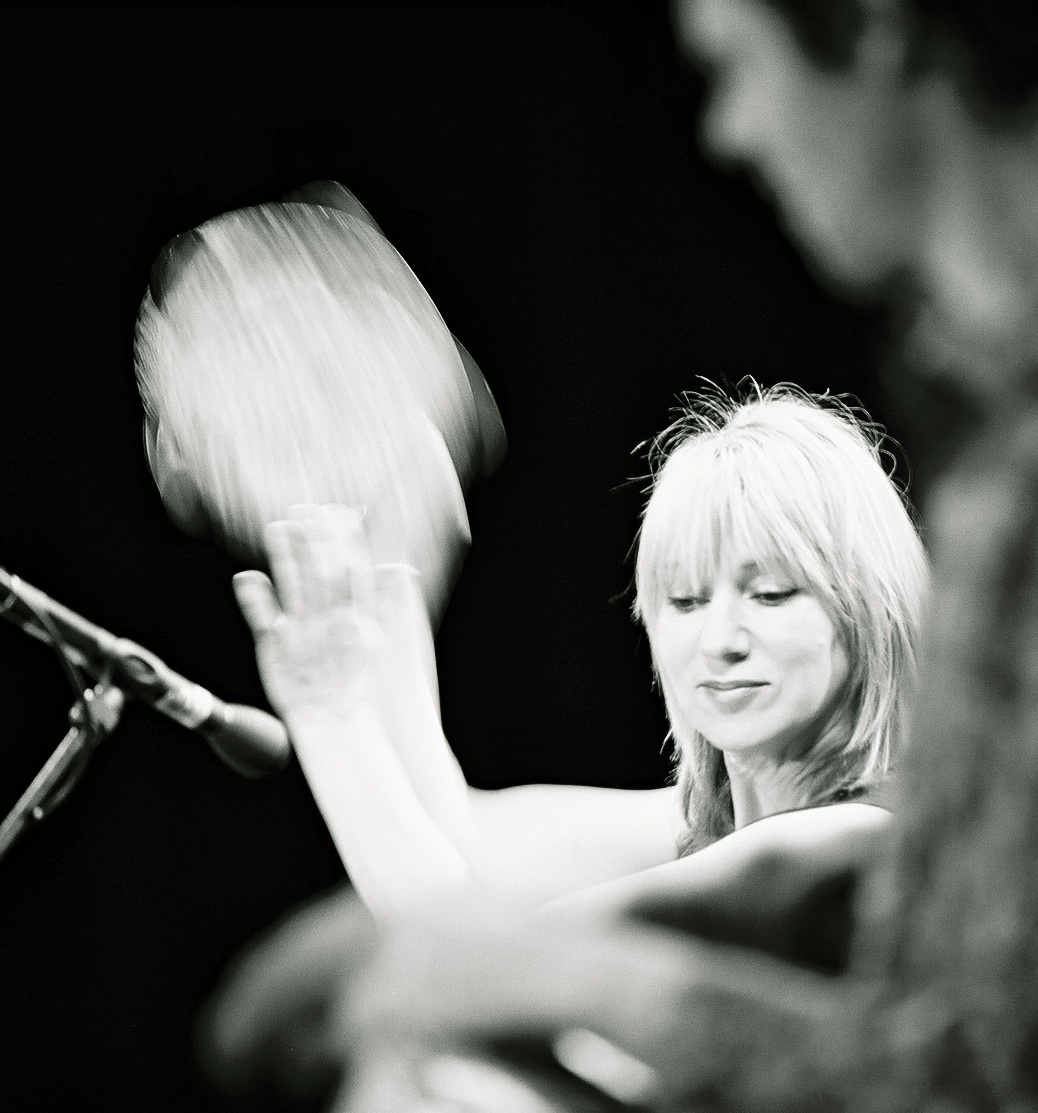
Lucie Skeaping playing a tambourine (2012)

=== Europe ===
Various European folk traditions include the tambourine. The Romani people used the tambourine as a percussion instrument, and it was often passed around the audience to collect money after a performance. In the late 1700s, the tambourine had a surge in popularity in England, with some composers of salon music writing parts for tambourine, indicating as many as 30 different playing strokes or moves. The tambourines of this era often had a circular hole in the frame for the thumb, as one of the moves was to spin the tambourine on the upright thumb. In the late 19th century, The Salvation Army codified the tambourine as one of their important rhythm instruments. They preferred the term "timbrel" which was taken from the Bible. By 1945, Salvation Army performances often entailed elaborate tambourine choreography performed by squads in para-military style, more for visual appeal than for musicality.

=== African American influence ===
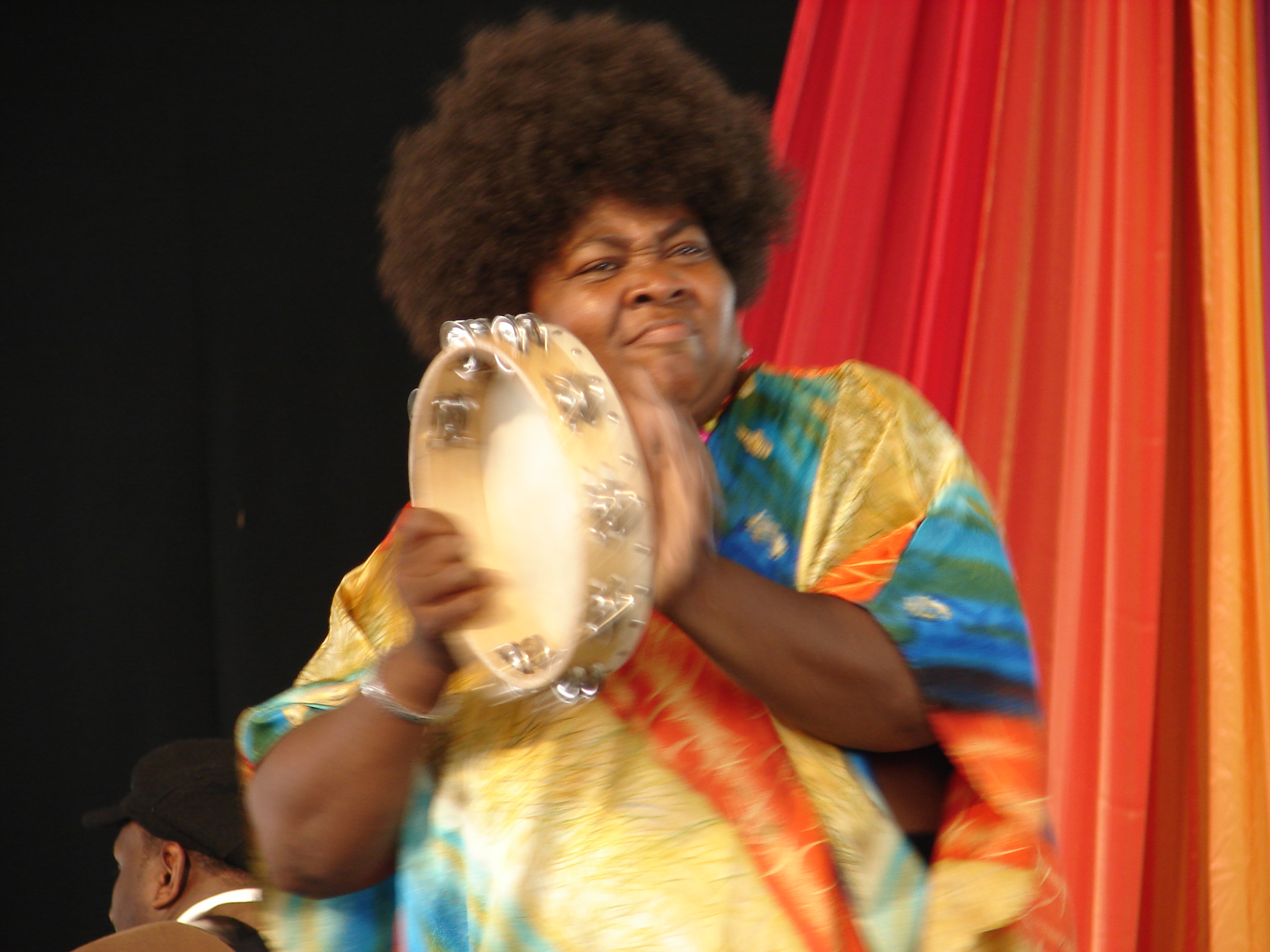
Lady Tambourine performs in 2008 at New Orleans Jazz & Heritage Festival in the gospel tent.

African American slaves were denied drums which might be used for long-distance communication. To supply rhythm in music, they turned to smaller percussion instruments such as the bones and the tambourine, as well as clapping and body percussion. The tambourine could accompany the singing of spirituals, and it was used for celebrations and dancing. The tambourine became one of the main instruments of the American minstrel show in the early 1800s, often performed by whites in blackface such as Ned Christy, or sometimes by actual black performers. On stage, the tambourine and bones players in minstrelsy stood to the far left and far right of the Interlocutor (master of ceremonies) and were titled Brother Tambo and Brother Bones: because of their position they were called the end men. The tambourine was also used in some vaudeville acts, including the 1840s dance and musical performances of Master Juba who was able to elicit a wide range of sounds from the instrument including the chugging of a steam train. Used for Pentecostal praise in revival meetings in the early 20th century, by the 1920s the tambourine was firmly established as the primary percussion instrument of gospel music. The tambourine was played by gospel groups and choirs, and carried prominently by singers who did not otherwise play an instrument, notably by Bessie Jones and Luther Magby.

At the same time, the tambourine expanded from gospel music to various forms of African American popular music including blues and jazz. For instance, singer and guitarist Blind Roosevelt Graves was accompanied by his brother Uaroy on tambourine and voice, singing both sacred and secular songs. Singer-songwriter Josh White got his start as a child performing for handouts in the street with an exuberant tambourine performance, beating the instrument's drumhead on his elbows, knees, and head.

In the 1950s as gospel elements were incorporated into rhythm and blues by African American singers such as Ray Charles, the tambourine often accompanied the changes. It continued its foray into popular music within the music of Motown. Motown singers and musicians often grew up with gospel music, and they carried the tambourine into pop performance. The Supremes performed with two tambourines – more for choreography than percussion – played by Florence Ballard and Mary Wilson standing apart from Diana Ross. Jack Ashford's distinctive tambourine playing was a dominant part of the rhythm section on many Motown records, for instance on the Miracles tune "Going to a Go-Go", and Marvin Gaye's "How Sweet It Is".

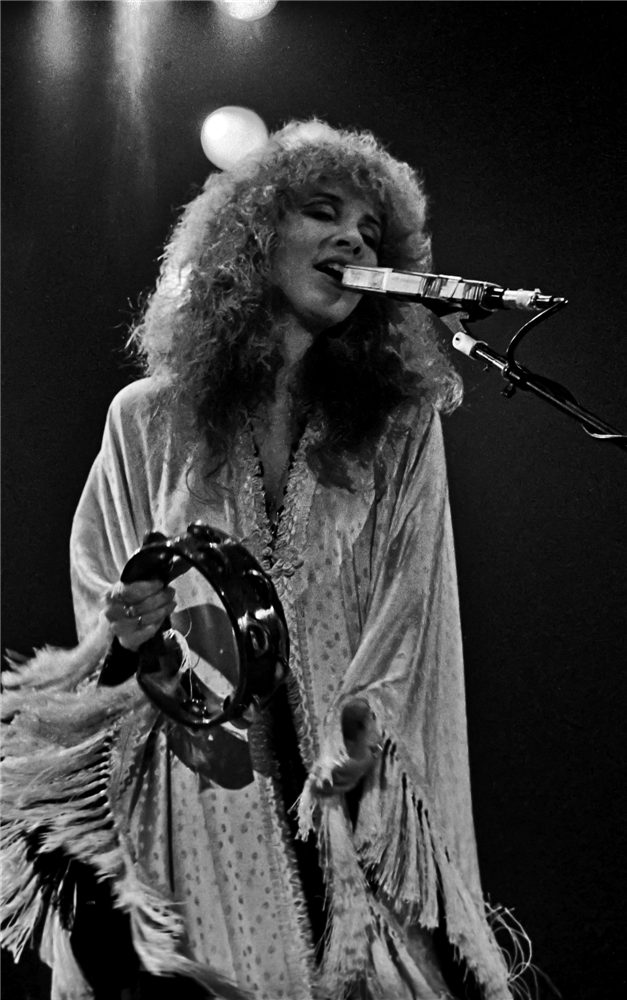
Stevie Nicks performing in 1980 on a headless tambourine

Inspired by African American examples, musicians of all races have used the tambourine in modern pop music. It was featured in "Green Tambourine", a busking-oriented song from the Lemon Pipers, a 1960s white American band. Similarly, the Byrds released a hit version of "Mr. Tambourine Man" in 1965, a folk rock and psychedelic rock recording of a song written by Bob Dylan. The tambourine part of the song serves to drive the beat forward.

Singers who rarely play an instrument are likely to play the tambourine at concerts: among the most well-known examples are Mick Jagger of the Rolling Stones, Jim Morrison of the Doors, Janis Joplin leading Big Brother and the Holding Company, and Stevie Nicks as part of Fleetwood Mac and as a solo performer. Very often, the instrument used in pop music is the headless tambourine or "jingle ring", lacking a drum head. The singer should, however, play the tambourine with the overall song arrangement in mind; in some cases, band members have purposely hidden the tambourine from an irresponsible lead singer who disregards the interplay of rhythm. On the other hand, skilled performers such as Jagger have brought a fine sense of timing to their tambourine playing. In the Rolling Stones' 1964 U.S. single of "Time Is on My Side", the less-known version, Jagger lays the tambourine on the front of the beat while Charlie Watts holds the snare to the back of the beat, which allows the longer decay time of the tambourine to synchronise with the snare at the end. The result is an intentional feeling of running to catch up.

In jazz, the tambourine was used prominently but non-traditionally by percussionist Joe Texidor who backed Rahsaan Roland Kirk in 1969 on Volunteered Slavery. In 1960 when Nina Simone wanted to play the old minstrel song "Li'l Liza Jane" at the Newport Jazz Festival, she said "Where's my tambourine?", as heard on the album Nina Simone at Newport. Jazz drummer Herlin Riley often takes the stage while beating and shaking a tambourine, and he is featured on the tambourine in Wynton Marsalis's jazz oratorio Blood on the Fields, which tells the story of slavery in the US.

Jazz, pop and rock drummers sometimes mount a headless tambourine in the drum kit. Some position the tambourine above the toms in the same manner as a cymbal, for instance, Nathan Followill of Kings of Leon, and Larry Mullen Jr of U2. Bill Ward of Black Sabbath connected a tambourine to a foot pedal, for his left foot to operate like a hi-hat. John Bonham of Led Zeppelin simply mounted a tambourine above the hi-hat for extra sonic colour. The Subdudes, a roots rock group from New Orleans, opted for a tambourine player, Steve Amedée, instead of a drummer.

== In classical music ==
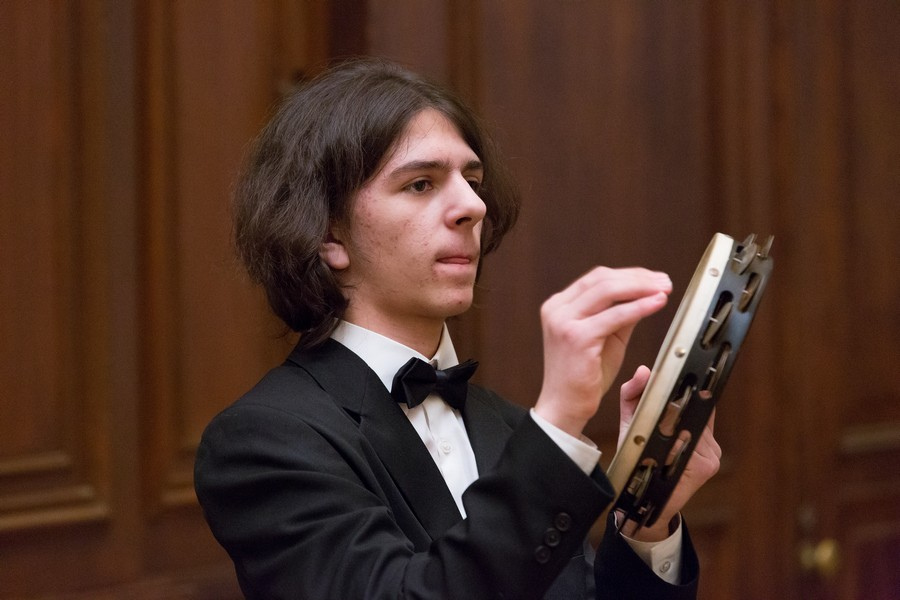
Percussionist in the Philadelphia Youth Orchestra, 2014

Wolfgang Amadeus Mozart was among the earliest western composers to include the tambourine in his compositions. Since the late eighteenth century it has become more common in western orchestral music, as exemplified in some of Pyotr Ilyich Tchaikovsky's dance pieces from the Nutcracker Suite. Gustav Holst's seven-movement orchestral suite The Planets also features the tambourine in several places, especially in the "Jupiter" movement. Georges Bizet's Carmen opera includes the famous "Habanera" aria which has a series of tambourine strikes in each chorus.

== Similar instruments ==
=== Buben ===
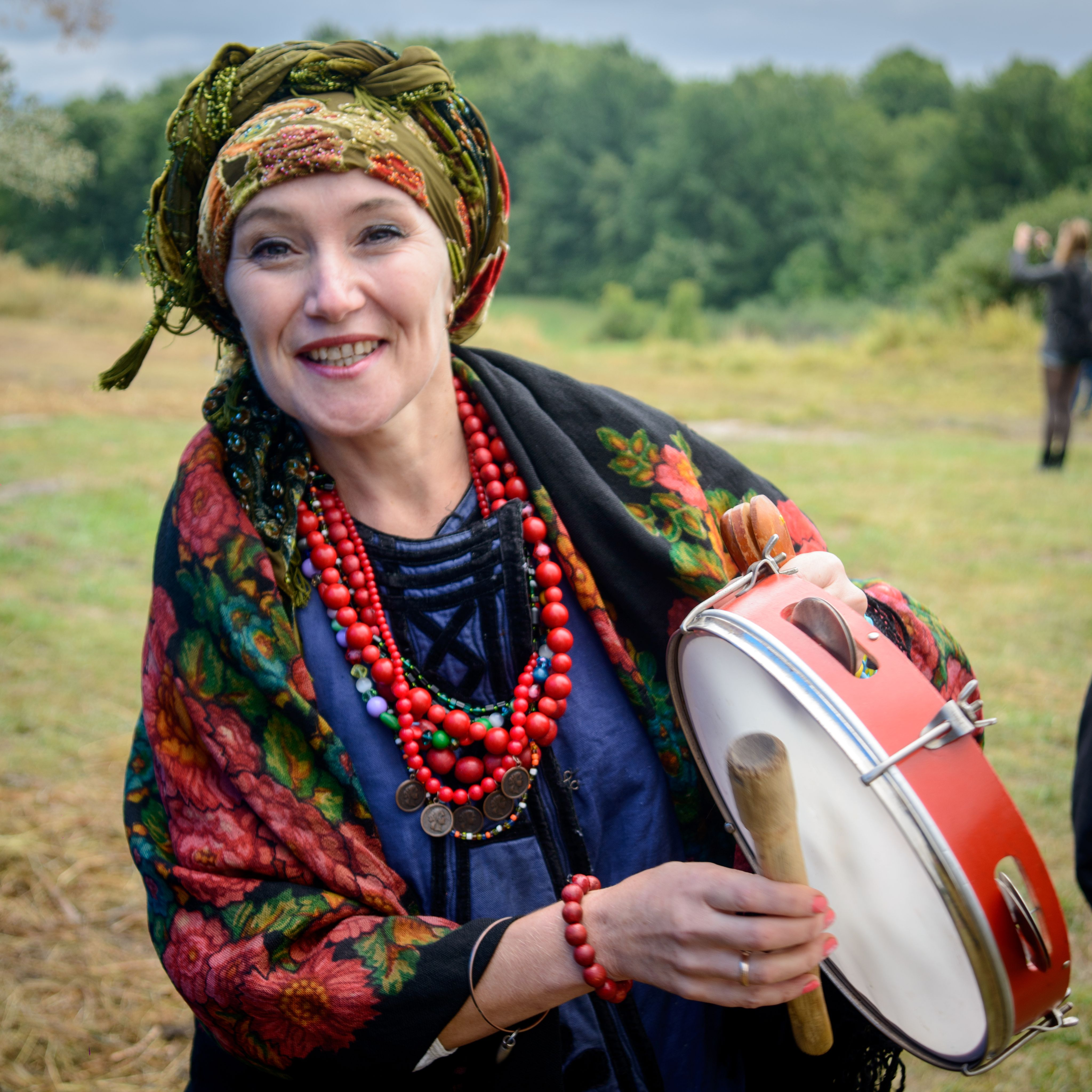
Ukrainian bubon

Buben (Бубен in Russian, Бубон in Ukrainian, boben in Slovenian, buben in Czech, bęben in Polish) is a musical instrument of the percussion family similar to a tambourine. A buben consists of a wooden or metal hoop with a tight membrane stretched over one of its sides (some bubens have no membrane at all). Certain kinds of bubens are equipped with clanking metal rings, plates, cymbals, or little bells. It is held in the hand and can be played in numerous ways, from stroking or shaking the jingles to striking it sharply with hand. It is used for rhythmical accompaniment during dances, soloist or choral singing. Buben is often used by some folk and professional bands, as well as orchestras.

The name is related to Greek language βόμβος ('low and hollow sound') and βομβύλη ('a breed of bees') and related to Indo-Aryan bambharas ('bee') and English bee. Buben is known to have existed in many countries since time immemorial, especially in the East. There are many kinds of bubens, including def, daf, or qaval (Azerbaijan), daf or khaval (Armenia), daira (Georgia), doira (Uzbekistan and Tajikistan), daire or def (Iran), bendeir (Arab countries), pandero (Spain). In Kievan Rus, drums and military timpani were referred to as buben.

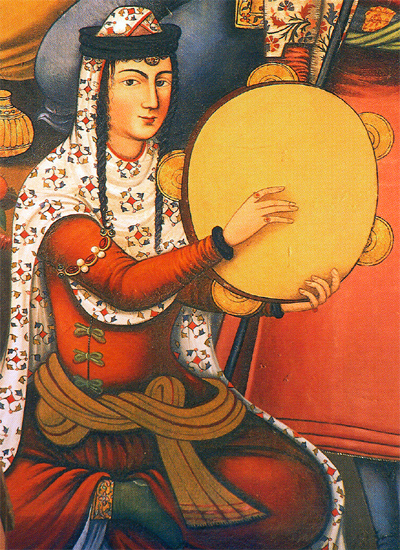
An Iranian woman playing a frame drum, from a painting on the walls of Chehel Sotoun palace, Isfahan, 17th century, Iran

=== Daf ===
A daf (دف) is a large-sized tambourine or Perso-Arabic frame drum used to accompany both popular and classical music in Iran, Azerbaijan, the Arab world, Turkey (where it is called tef), Uzbekistan (where it is called childirma), the Indian subcontinent (where it is known as the dafli) and Turkmenistan. Daf typically indicates the beat and tempo of the music being played, thus acts like the conductor in the monophonic oriental music. The Persian poet Rudaki, who widely used names of the musical instruments in his poems, mentions the daf and the tambourine (taboorak) in a Ruba'i: A common use of tambourine (Daf) is by Albanians. They are often played by women and bridesmaids in wedding cases to lead the ceremony when bride walks down the aisle.

=== Pandeiro ===
Originated in Galicia or Portugal, the pandeiro was brought to Brazil by the Portuguese settlers. It is a hand percussion instrument consisting of a single tension-headed drum with jingles in the frame. It is very typical of more traditional Brazilian music.

=== Panderoa ===
The Basque pandero is a folk instrument currently played along with the trikitixa (basque diatonic accordion) in a duo most of the time. Sometimes the players, who play in festivities to enliven the atmosphere or less frequently at onstage performances, sing along. At times the pandero accompanies the alboka or txistu too. Yet these kinds of duos have not always been the case. As attested in 1923, the youth gathered to dance to the rhythm of the bare pandero, with no other music instrument implicated but the player's (a woman's) voice.

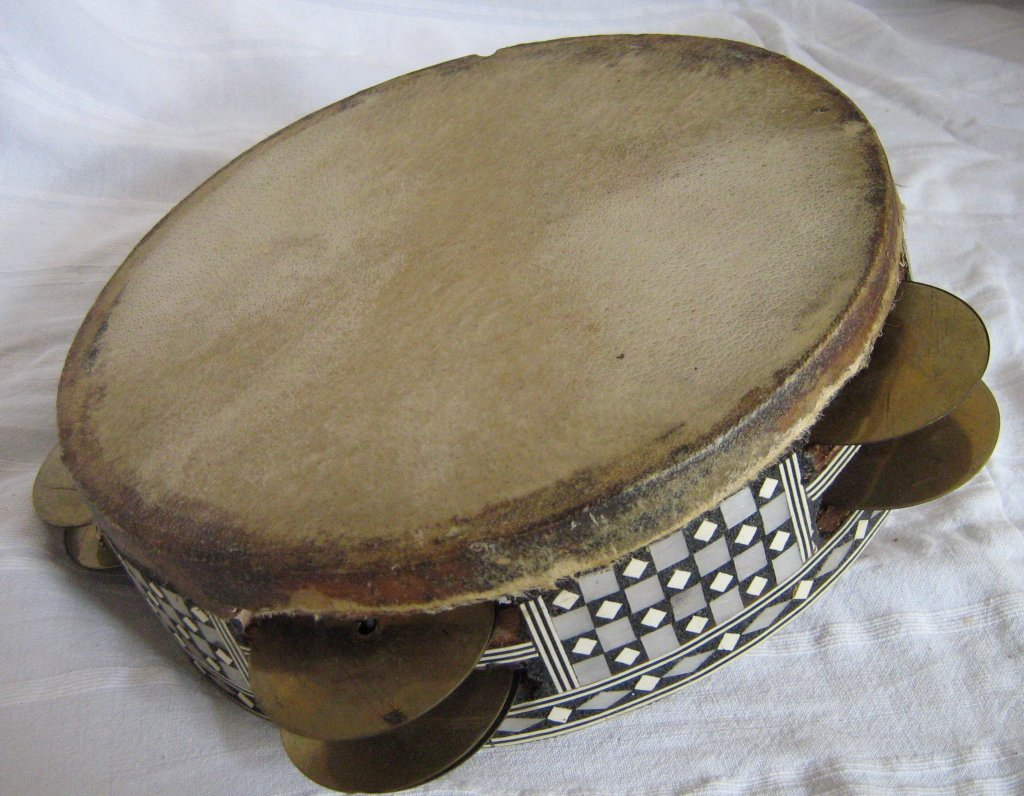
Arabic riq

=== Riq ===
The riq (also spelled riqq or rik) is a type of tambourine used as a traditional instrument in Arabic music. It is an important instrument in both folk and classical music throughout the Arabic-speaking world. The instruments are widely known as shakers.

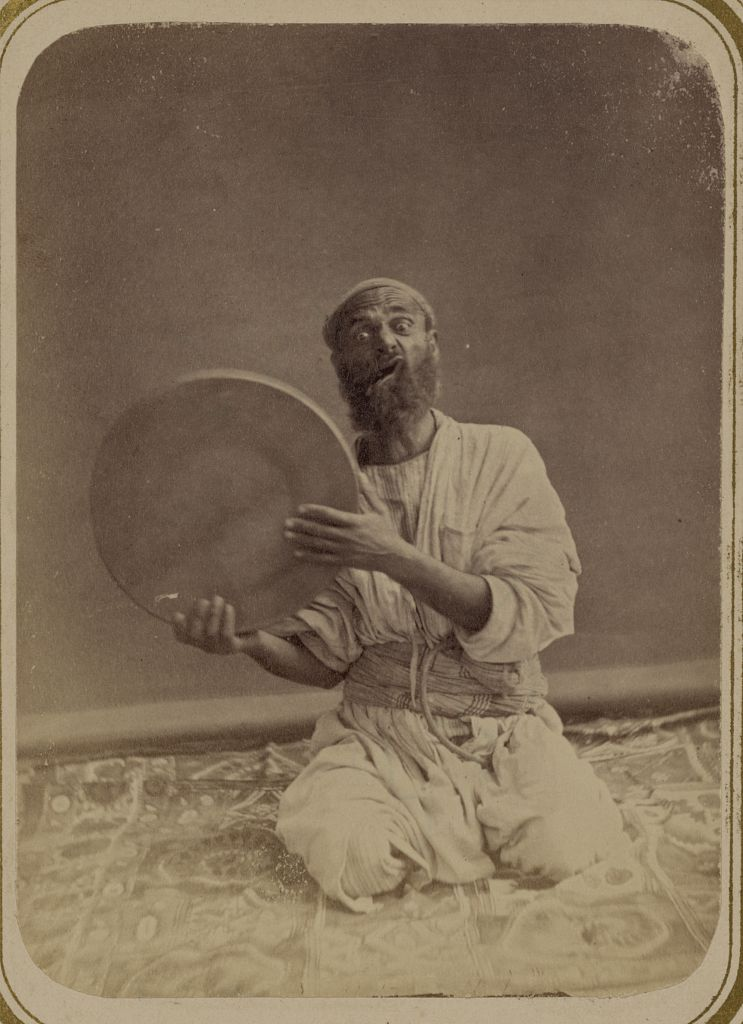
A traditional Central Asian musician from the 1860s or 1870s, holding up his dayereh

=== Dayereh ===
A dayereh (or doyra, dojra, dajre, doira, daire) is a medium-sized frame drum with jingles used to accompany both popular and classical music in Iran (Persia), the Balkans, and many central Asian countries such as Afghanistan, Tajikistan, and Uzbekistan. It is a percussion instrument, and is something intermediate between a drum and a tambourine.

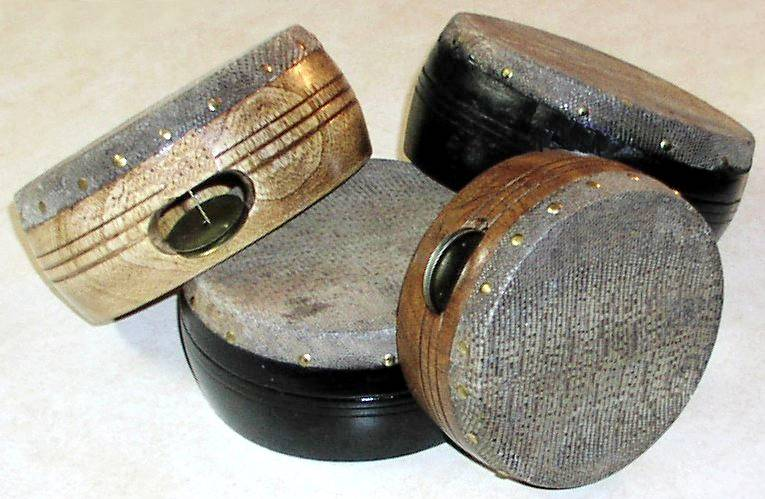
Kanjira drums

=== Kanjira ===
The kanjira or ganjira is a South Indian frame drum of the tambourine family. It is mostly used in Carnatic music concerts (South Indian classical music) as a supporting instrument for the mridangam. The instrument is called dafli (डफली in the northern Hindi-speaking parts of India and is a common instrument in orchestras and solos. Nepal also has a variety of tambourines, going by the names daanf, damphu (Nepali: डम्फू), hring, and khaijadi (Nepali: खैंजडी).

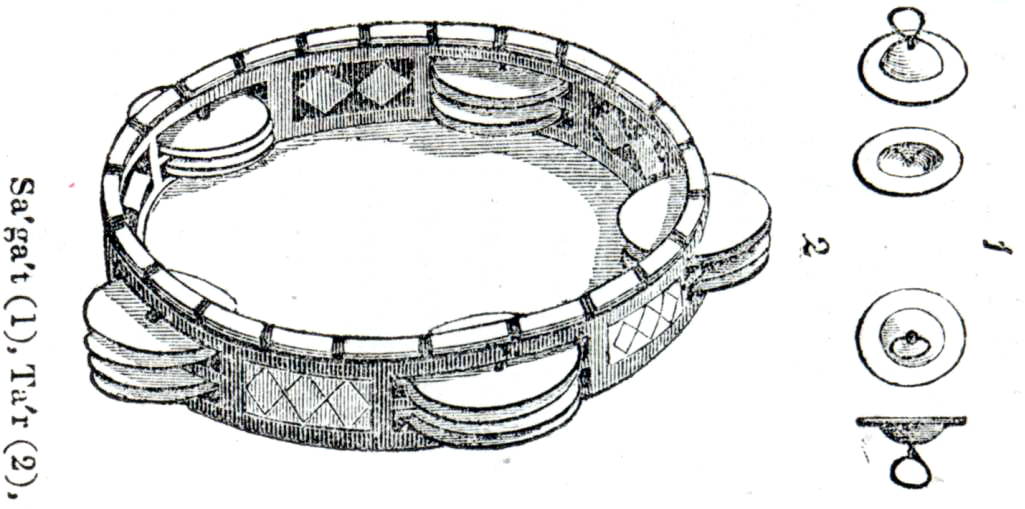
Ta'r, Egypt, picture p.366 in Edward William Lane (1836). An Account of the Manners and Customs of Modern Egyptians (5th ed.) (published 1860).

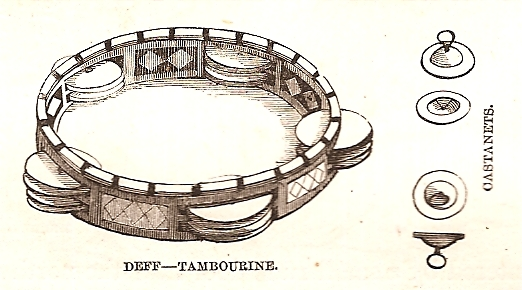
Deff - Tambourine, Palestine, picture p. 579 in W. M. Thomson: The Land and the Book; or Biblical Illustrations Drawn from the Manners and Customs, the Scenes and Scenery of the Holy Land. Vol. II. New York, 1859.

=== Tar ===
Tar (Arabic: طار) is a single-headed frame drum of Turkish origin, but is commonly played in North Africa and the Middle East.

=== Timbrel ===
Timbrel or tabret (the tof of the ancient Hebrews, the deff of Islam, the adufe of the Moors of Spain), the principal musical instrument of percussion of the Israelites, similar to the modern tambourine.

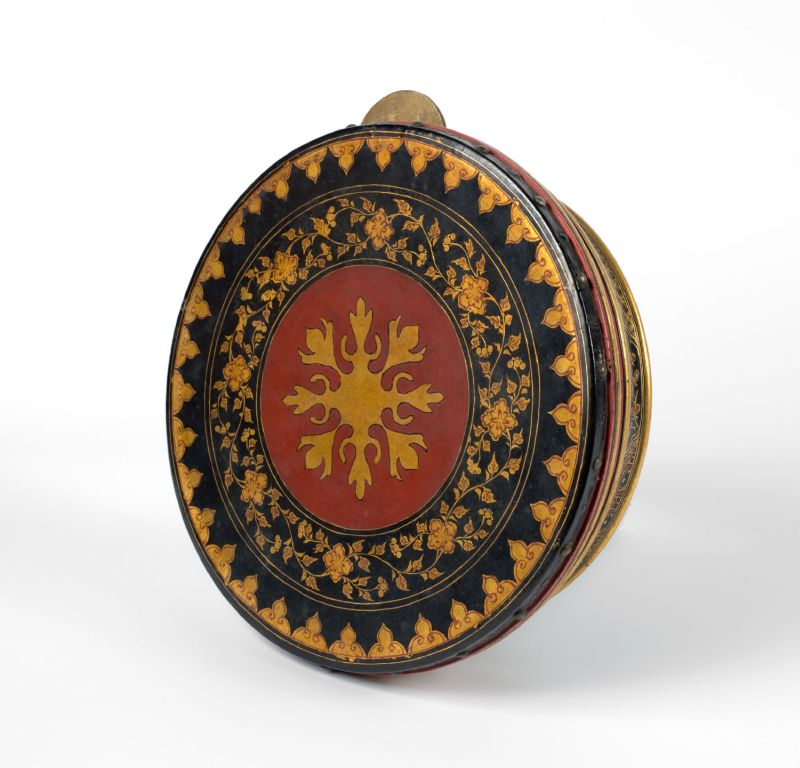
Redep, a rebana from Palembang, South Sumatra, with its typical red, black, and gold color

=== Rabana ===
A rabana (plural raban) is a one-sided traditional tambourine played with the hands, used in Sri Lanka.

=== Rebana ===
Rebana is a Malay tambourine that is used in Islamic devotional music in Southeast Asia, particularly in Indonesia, Malaysia, Brunei, and Singapore.

== See also ==
- Frame drum
- Dayereh
- Bendir
- Daf
- Pandero
- Pandero jarocho
- Riq
- Timbrel
- Tamborim
- Ravanne
- Bodhrán
- Sistrum
