= George Vosburgh =

American classical trumpeter

George Vosburgh (born Sept. 24, 1957) was the principal trumpet player of the Pittsburgh Symphony Orchestra from 1992 until his retirement in 2017. He is a teacher at Carnegie Mellon University; he taught at Duquesne University until the 2015 school year. When he joined the Chicago Symphony Orchestra in 1978, he was the youngest person ever to join the orchestra's brass section. Vosburgh was the recipient of a Best New Classical Artist Grammy Award in 1985 for his recording of Igor Stravinsky's L'Histoire du Soldat with Chicago Pro Musica.
