= Chicago Pro Musica =

American chamber ensemble

Chicago Pro Musica is a chamber ensemble founded in 1979 by pianist Easley Blackwood and clarinetist John Bruce Yeh. The ensemble recorded a number of sessions at Medinah Temple for Reference Recordings. Chicago Pro Musica's 1985 "FACADE" recording of William Walton's "FACADE" and Stravinsky's L'Histoire du Soldat earned the ensemble a Grammy award for Best New Classical Artist.

== Notable members ==
- Easley Blackwood (piano)
- John Bruce Yeh (clarinet)
- Robert Black (saxophone)
- Willard Elliot (bassoon)
- Daniel Gingrich (horn)
- Richard Graef (flute)
- Joseph Guastafeste (bass)
- Albert Igolnikov (violin)
- Donald Koss (percussion)
- Don Moline (cello)
- George Vosburgh (trumpet)
