= List of bassoonists =

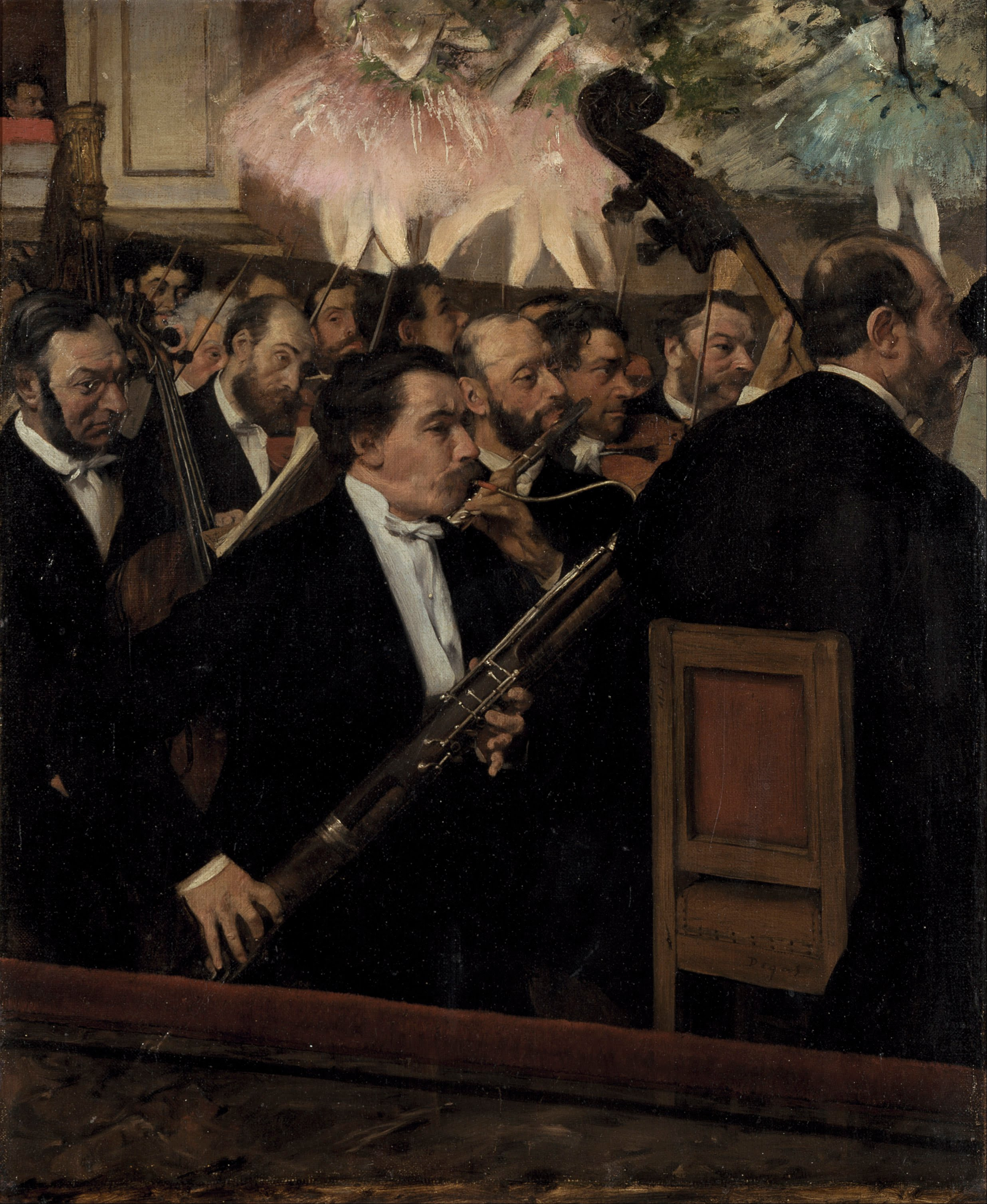
A bassoonist in The Orchestra at the Opera by Edgar Degas, c. 1870

A list of notable bassoonists.

== Algeria ==
- Abdon Laus (1888–1945)

== Australia ==
- George Dreyfus (born 1928)
- Lyndon Watts (born 1976)
- Matthew Wilkie

== Austria ==
- Milan Turković (born 1939)

== Belgium ==
- Jean-Théodore Radoux (1835–1911)

== Bulgaria ==
- Marin Valtchanov (1949–2017)

== Canada ==
- Bill Douglas (born 1944)
- Pierre Mercure (1927–1966)
- George Zukerman (1927–2023)

== Czechia ==
- Antoine Bullant (1751–1821)
- Ludwig Milde (1849–1913)
- Václav Vonášek (born 1980)

== Denmark ==
- Peter Bastian (1943–2017)
- Kjell Roikjer (1901–1999)
- Asger Svendsen

== Estonia ==
- Martin Kuuskmann (born 1971)

== France ==
- Maurice Allard (1922–1988)
- Adolphe Blaise (1737–1772)
- François Devienne (1759–1803)
- Désiré Dihau (1833–1909)
- François-René Gebauer (1773–1845)
- Eugène Louis-Marie Jancourt (1815–1901)
- Fernand Oubradous (1903–1986)
- Étienne Ozi (1754–1813)

== Germany ==
- Carl Almenräder (1786–1846)
- Friedrich Berr (1794–1838)
- Marc Engelhardt (born 1961)
- Albrecht Holder (born 1958)
- Klaus Thunemann (1937–2025)
- Julius Weissenborn (1837–1888)

== Hungary ==
- Tamás Benkócs (born 1971)

== Israel ==
- Mordechai Rechtman (1926–2023)
- Uzi Shalev (born 1961)

== Italy ==
- Enzo Muccetti (1912–1977)
- Sergio Azzolini (born 1967)
- Rino Vernizzi (1946–2022)

== Japan ==
- Hideo Kachi (born 1953)

== Netherlands ==
- Thom de Klerk (1912–1966)
- Bram van Sambeek (born 1980)

== New Zealand ==
- Peter Musson (born 1940)

== Norway ==
- Per Hannevold (born 1953)

== Switzerland ==
- Willy Hess (1906–1977)

== Ukraine ==
- Volodymyr Apatsky (1928–2018)

== Uruguay ==
- Gustavo Núñez (born 1965)

== United Kingdom ==
- Meyrick Alexander (born 1952)
- Roger Birnstingl
- Gwydion Brooke (1912–2005)
- Archie Camden (1888–1979)
- Michael Chapman (1934–2005)
- Karen Clark née Geoghegan (born 1989)
- Margaret Cookhorn
- Lindsay Cooper (1951–2013)
- Charles Cracknell (1915–1997)
- Edward Elgar (1857–1934)
- Vernon Elliott (1912–1996)
- Martin Gatt (born 1936)
- Rachel Gough
- John Hebden (1712–1765)
- Chloe Herington
- Cecil James (1913–1999)
- Ursula Leveaux
- Gordon Laing (born 1964)
- David Munrow (1942–1976)
- John Orford
- Laurence Perkins (born 1954)
- Julie Price (born 1963)
- Hannah Rankin (born 1990)
- Graham Sheen (born 1952)
- Philip Turbett (born 1961)
- Jeremy Ward
- William Waterhouse (1931–2007)

== United States ==
- Karen Borca (born 1948)
- Garvin Bushell (1902–1991)
- Lewis Hugh Cooper (1920–2007)
- Willard Somers Elliot (1926–2000)
- Marvin P. Feinsmith (1932/33–2020)
- Dall Fields (1889–1956)
- Hugo Fox (1897–1969)
- Bernard Garfield (1924–2025)
- Arthur Grossman
- Paul Hanson (born 1957)
- K. David van Hoesen (1926–2016)
- Benjamin Kamins (born 1952)
- Ron Klimko (1936–2012)
- Peter Kolkay
- Simon Kovar (1890–1970)
- Judith LeClair (born 1958)
- Tariq Masri (born 1973)
- Stephen Maxym (1915–2002)
- John Miller Jr. (born 1942)
- Anthony Parnther (born 1981)
- Ray Pizzi (1943–2021)
- Johnny Reinhard (born 1956)
- Peter Schickele (1935–2024)
- Sol Schoenbach (1915–1999)
- Leonard Sharrow (1915–2004)
- Wilbur Simpson (1917–1997)
- Kim Walker
- Sherman Walt (1923–1989)
- Arthur Weisberg (1931–2009)
- Dan Welcher (born 1948)
- Robert S. Williams (born 1949)
- Bryan Young (born 1974)

== Venezuela ==
- Victor Guillermo Ramos Rangel (1911–1986)
