= Duet concertino for clarinet and bassoon =

Duet-Concertino
- Double concerto by Richard Strauss
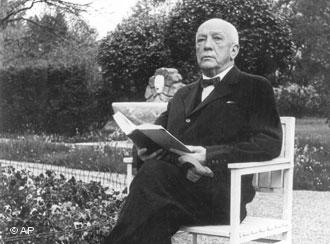
- Strauss at Garmisch in 1938
- Key: F major
- Catalogue: TrV 293
- Composed: Completed 15 December 1947
- Dedication: To my dear friend Hugo Burghauser.
- Scoring: Clarinet, bassoon, strings, harp

The Duet-Concertino for clarinet and bassoon with string orchestra and harp in F major, TrV 293, was written by Richard Strauss in 1946/47 and premiered in 1948. It is the last purely instrumental work he wrote.

== Composition history ==
The first mention of the Duet-Concertino in Strauss's notebook is 15 December 1946 when he was in Baden, Switzerland. He mentioned working on it again in September 1947 when at Pontresina, finishing the score on 16 December 1947 when he was in Montreux. The impetus for completing it was a commission in the summer of 1947 from Otmar Nussio for his orchestra, the Orchestra della Svizzera Italiana. The concerto was written with an old friend in mind: Professor Hugo Burghauser, who had been the principal bassoonist with the Vienna Philharmonic but had since emigrated to New York. The score published by Boosey & Hawkes in 1949 has the dedication to Burghauser. Strauss had written to him in 1946:

I am very busy with an idea for a double concerto for clarinet and bassoon thinking especially of your beautiful tone – nevertheless, apart from a few sketched out themes it still remains no more than an intention. Perhaps it would interest you.

The score may have an underlying program for the first movement. When the concerto was completed, Strauss wrote again to Burghauser joking that

A dancing princess is alarmed by the grotesque cavorting of a bear in imitation of her. At last she is won over to the creature and dances with it, upon which it turns into a prince. So in the end, you too will turn into a prince and live happily ever after...

However, Juergen May argues that the program is more plausibly based on Homer: Odysseus lands on the island of Scheria and subsequently meets the princess Nausicaa.

The work is written in three movements (Allegro moderato – Andante – Rondo), although the second movement acts as little more than a brief transition between the outer movements. The dance-like third movement is very much in the spirit of his Oboe Concerto. David Hurwitz writes that "Works such as this are unique and have no true antecedents in the orchestral literature ... That Strauss wrote it at all is something miraculous." May relates the piece to a comment Strauss had made in his 1904 update on Berlioz' Treatise on Instrumentation, where he comments on a bassoon passage: "One can't help hearing the voice of an old man humming the melodies dearest to him when he was a youth".

A performance takes about 18 minutes.

== Performance history ==
On 4 April 1948, the world premiere was broadcast on Radio Lugano, with the Orchestra della Svizzera Italiana conducted by Otmar Nussio, with Armando Basile on clarinet and Bruno Bergamaschi on bassoon. Strauss was not present, but it is mentioned in his notebook indicating that he might have listened to the broadcast. The British premiere was given at Manchester by the Halle Orchestra on 4 May 1949 with John Barbirolli conducting and the clarinet played by Pat Ryan and bassoon by Charles Cracknell. The work was also performed later that year on 29 July at the BBC Proms with Malcolm Sargent conducting the London Symphony Orchestra with Frederick Thurston on the clarinet and Archie Camden on bassoon. The Australian premiere was broadcast in 1959 by the Australian Broadcasting Commission with the West Australian Symphony Orchestra with Jack Harrison on clarinet and Jill Mowson (née Harrison) on bassoon.

== Instrumentation ==
The scoring of the concerto is distinctive. In addition to the standard strings and harp, Strauss divides the string sections into "Soli" (the lead player for each of the five sections) and "tutti" (the body of players) in the manner of the baroque concerto grosso. The opening bars feature the five solo players augmented by a second viola, reminiscent of the sextet which opens his opera Capriccio.

== Recordings ==
Recordings include:

CD title and release date (if known)	Clarinet	Bassoon	Orchestra and conductor	Label and reference
R. Strauss: Complete Orchestral Works (2013)	Manfred Weise	Wolfgang Liebscher	Staatskapelle Dresden, Rudolf Kempe	Warner Classics: 4317802
Strauss - The Concertos (1999)	Dimitri Ashkenazy	Kim Walker	Radio Symphonie Orchester Berlin, Vladimir Ashkenazy	Decca E4602962
R. Strauss: Metamorphosen (1989)	Paul Meyer	Knut Sönstevold	New Stockholm Chamber Orchestra, Esa-Pekka Salonen	CBS Masterworks MK 44702
Strauss, R: Oboe Concerto in D, etc. (1997)	Peter Schmidl	Michael Werba	Vienna Philharmonic, André Previn	Deutsche Gramaphon DG E4534832
Strauss: Sinfonia Domestica etc. (2005)	Nicholas Cox	Alan Pendlebury	Royal Liverpool Philharmonic, Gerard Schwarz	Avie AV2071
Mozart: Clarinet Concertos & Duett-Concertino (2006)	Richard Hosford	Matthew Wilkie	Chamber Orchestra of Europe, Thierry Fischer	COE records CDCOE811
Richard Strauss (2015)	Corado Giuffredi	Alberto Biano	Orchestra della Svizzeria italiana, Markus Poschner	CPO 7779902
The Princess & the Bear (2018)	Sarah Watts	Laurence Perkins	Royal Scottish National Orchestra, Sian Edwards	Hyperion CDA68263
Richard Strauss: Concertante Works (2019)	Michael Collins	Julie Price	BBC Symphony Orchestra, Michael Collins	Chandos CHAN20034
