= Karen Clark =

Karen Clark may refer to:

- Karen Clark (American politician) (1945–2026)
- Karen Clark (British politician)
- Karen Clark (bassoonist)
- Karen Clark (synchronized swimmer) (born 1972)
- Karen Clark (rower) (born 1978)
- Karen Clark Sheard (née Clark; born 1960), American Gospel singer, musician and songwriter

== See also ==
- Karen Clarke (disambiguation)
