= Julius Fučík (composer) =

Czech military bandmaster and composer

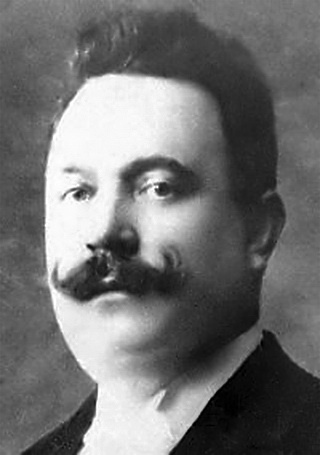
- Born: Julius Ernst Wilhelm Fučík; 18 July 1872; Prague, Bohemia, Austria-Hungary
- Died: 25 September 1916 (aged 44); Berlin, German Empire
- Notable work: Entrance of the Gladiators; The Florentiner March
- Relatives: Julius Fučík (nephew)

Julius Ernst Wilhelm Fučík (Czech: Julius Arnošt Vilém Fučík [ˈjulɪjus ˈfutʃiːk]; 18 July 1872 – 25 September 1916) was a Czech composer and conductor of military bands. He became a prolific composer, with over 400 marches, polkas and waltzes to his name. As most of his works were for military bands, Fučík is sometimes known as the "Bohemian Sousa".

Today, Fučík's marches are still played as patriotic music in the Czech Republic. His worldwide reputation rests primarily on two works: "Florentiner Marsch", popular throughout much of Europe and the United States, and the "Entrance of the Gladiators" (Vjezd gladiátorů), which is widely recognised, often under the title "Thunder and Blazes", as popular entrance music for circus clowns.

== Early life and education ==
"Entrance of the Gladiators"
"Entrance of the Gladiators", played by the United States Marine Band in the late 1990s

The Florentiner March
"The Florentiner March", played by the United States Navy Band in 2006

Julius Ernst Wilhelm Fučík was born on 18 July 1872 in Prague, Bohemia, Austria-Hungary. As a student, he learned how to play the bassoon with Ludwig Milde, the violin with Antonín Bennewitz, and various percussion instruments, later studying composition under Antonín Dvořák.

== Career ==
In 1891, Fučík joined the 49th Austro-Hungarian Regiment as a military musician. He initially played in Krems by the Danube under Josef Wagner. Three years later, Fučík left the army to take up a position as second bassoonist at the German Theatre in Prague. In 1895, he became the conductor of the Danica Choir in the Croatian city of Sisak. During this time, Fučík wrote a number of chamber music pieces, mostly for clarinet and bassoon.

In 1897, Fučík rejoined the army as the bandmaster for the 86th Infantry Regiment based in Sarajevo. Shortly afterward, he wrote his most famous piece, the Einzug der Gladiatoren or "Entrance of the Gladiators". Originally titled Grande Marche Chromatique for its use of chromatic scales, Fučík's interest in Roman history led him to give the march its current name. In 1910, the Canadian composer Louis-Philippe Laurendeau arranged "Entrance of the Gladiators" for a small band, under the title "Thunder and Blazes." It is in this version that the piece is most familiar, universally associated with the appearance of the clowns in a circus performance.

In 1900, Fučík's band was moved to Budapest, where he found there were eight regimental bands ready to play his compositions. However, Fučík also faced more competition to get noticed. Having more musicians at his disposal, Fučík began to experiment with transcriptions of orchestral works. While in Budapest in 1907, he composed another march "The Florentiner March".

In 1910, Fučík moved again, returning to Bohemia where he became the bandmaster of the 92nd Infantry Regiment in Theresienstadt. At the time, the band was one of the finest in the Austro-Hungarian Empire, and he toured with them giving concerts in Prague and Berlin to audiences of over 10,000 people.

== Later life and death ==
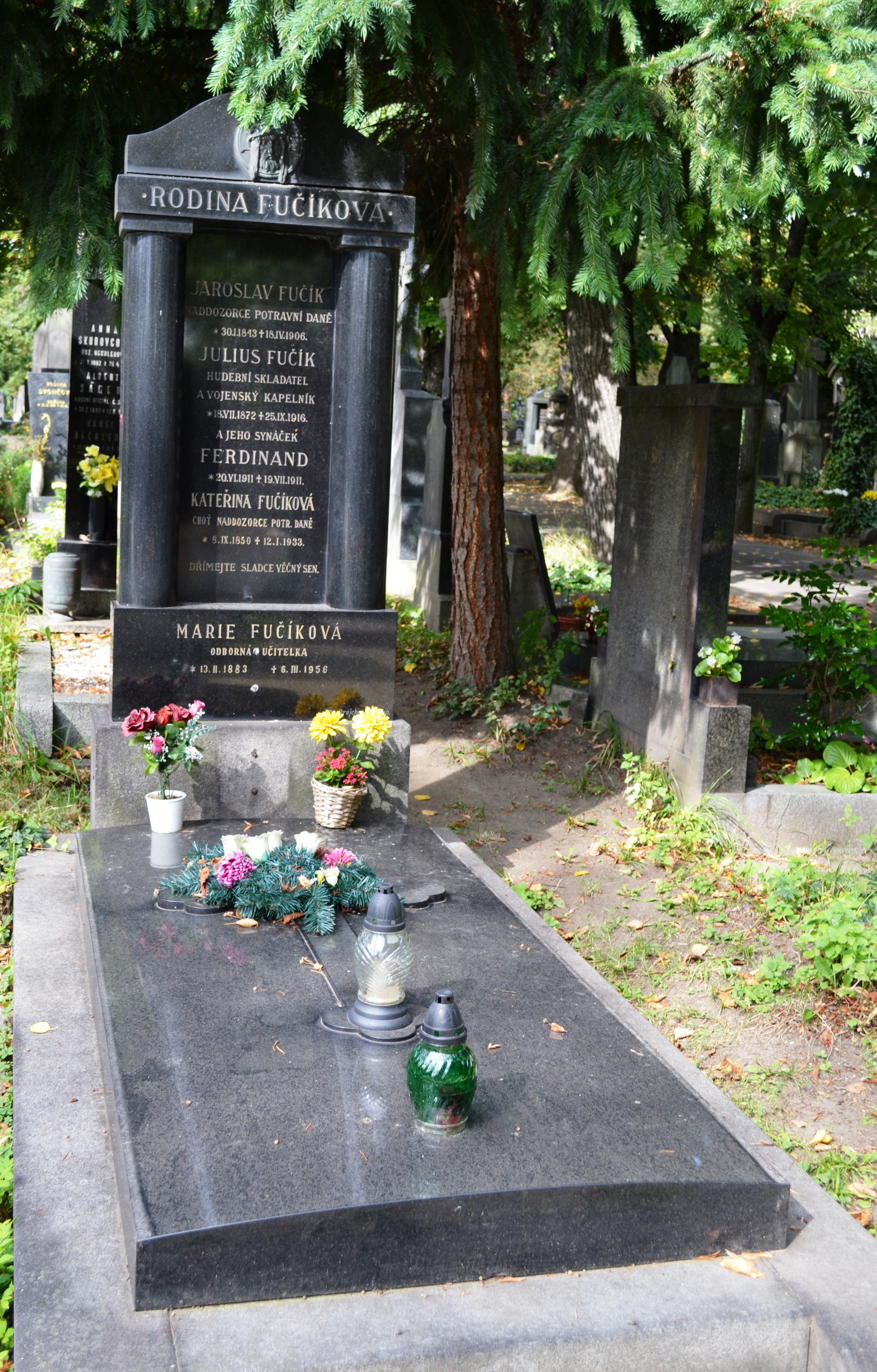
Fučík's grave at the Vinohrady Cemetery

In 1913, Fučík settled in Berlin, where he started his own band, the Prager Tonkünstler-Orchester, and a music publishing company, Tempo Verlag, to market his compositions. Fučík's fortunes began to wane with the outbreak of World War I. Under the privations of the war, his business failed and his health suffered.

Fučík died in Berlin on 25 September 1916; he was only 44 years old. He is buried at the Vinohrady Cemetery in Prague.

Fučík was the brother of the opera singer Karel Fučík and uncle of the journalist Julius Fučík, who shared his name.

== In popular culture ==
A 1976 barrel organ recording of Fučik’s classic march Die Regimentskinder (English: Children of the Regiment) by the C. John Mears Organisation is prominently featured in the popular Atari Interactive video game RollerCoaster Tycoon.

== Selected works ==
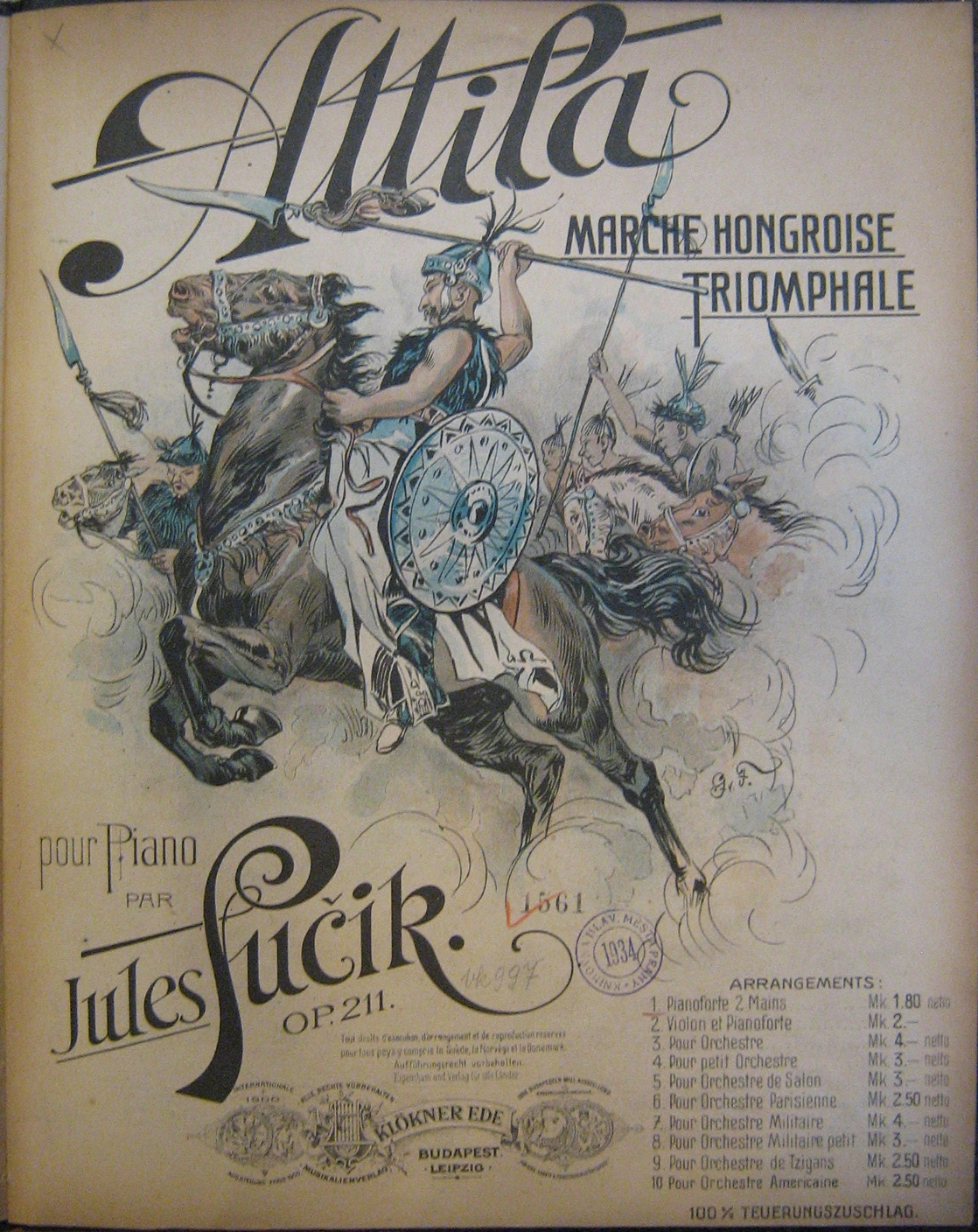
Sheet music for Attila

=== Marches ===
- Vjezd gladiátorů op. 68 (Entrance of the Gladiators) (1897)
- Salve Imperator op. 224 (1898)
- Danubia op. 229 (1899)
- Triglav op. 72 (1900)
- Pod admirálskou vlajkou (1901)
- Mississippi River (1902)
- Fantastický pochod (Marche fantastique) (1902)
- Triglav (1903)
- Stále vpřed (Sempre avanti) (1904)
- Stráž Slovanstva (1907)
- Florentinský pochod op. 214 (Florentiner Marsch) (1907)
- Veselí venkovští kováři (1908)
- Hercegovac op. 235 (1908)
- Boží bojovníci (1911)
- Vítězný meč (1913)
- Zvuky fanfár (1914)
- Schneidig vor op. 79
- Vojenský (Il soldato) op. 92
- Stále kupředu op. 149
- Die Regimentskinder op. 169
- Attila op. 211
- Die Lustigen Dorfschmiede op. 218
- Uncle Teddy op. 239
- Furchtlos und Treu op. 240
- Die Siegesschwert op. 260
- Leitmeritzer Schuetzenmarsch op. 261
- Einzug der Olympischen Meisterringer op. 274
- Fanfarenklaenge op. 278
- Erinnerung an Trient op. 287
- Siegestrophaen op. 297
- Gigantic op. 311
- Sarajevo-Marsch op. 66

=== Waltzes and polkas ===
- Ideály snů – waltz (1900)
- Od břehu Dunaje (Vom Donauufer) op. 135 – waltz (1903)
- Escarpolette – waltz (1906)
- Virtuoso polka for fagot Starý bručoun (1907)
- Zimní bouře (Winter Storm) op. 184 – waltz (1907)
- Dunajské pověsti – waltz (1909)
- Baletky – waltz (1909)
- Liebesflammen op. 248 (valzer)
- Tanec milionů op. 121 (waltz)

=== Other works ===
- Concertant overtures Marinarella op. 215 (1907) and Miramare (1912)
- Symphonic suite Život (Life) (1907)
- St. Hubertus op. 250 (Overture)
- Requiem op. 281
- Chamber compositions for clarinet and bassoon
