= Andrew West =

Andrew or Andy West may refer to:

- Andrew West (linguist) (1960–2025), English linguist
- Andrew West (pianist) (born 1979), English pianist
- Andrew Fleming West (1853–1943), American classicist and academic administrator
- Andrew J. West (born 1983), American actor
- Andy West (born 1953), American bass guitarist and composer
- Andy West (biologist), English-New Zealand biologist and academic administrator
- Andy West (Big Brother) (born c. 1982), British reality show participant
