= Donald Palma =

American conductor

Donald Palma is a prominent classical double bassist, conductor, bass instructor, and educator of ensemble performance. He is a native of New York City, and is a graduate of the Juilliard School. Palma studied with several noted bassists including Frederick Zimmermann, Robert Brennand, former principal bass of the New York Philharmonic; Orin O'Brien, and Homer Mensch.

== Double bass ==
At twenty years of age, Palma became a member of Leopold Stokowski's American Symphony Orchestra, and joined the Los Angeles Philharmonic at the age of twenty-four. In 1971 he won the Young Concert Artists International Auditions. Palma is a founding member of the prestigious Orpheus Chamber Orchestra. He is a noted chamber musician, having performed with the Nash Ensemble, Juilliard Quartet, the Chamber Music Society of Lincoln Center, the Da Camera Society of Houston, and Speculum Musicae, and has appeared in recital with such noted artists as Dietrich Fischer-Dieskau, Jean-Pierre Rampal, Jan DeGaetani and Jorge Bolet. Palma is also the former principal bassist with the National Arts Centre Orchestra in Ottawa, Ontario, Canada. Palma also appeared on Charles Schwartz's 1979 jazz symphony Mother ! Mother ! with Clark Terry and Zoot Sims.

== Conducting ==
Palma frequently conducts ensembles at the New England Conservatory of Music and is both a bassist and conductor with Speculum Musicae. Palma is the former music director for the San Francisco Contemporary Music Players, which was awarded two ASCAP-Chamber Music America Awards for adventurous programming during his tenure. Palma is the conductor and music director of Symphony by the Sea, which performs in Marblehead and Byfield, MA.

== Teaching ==
Palma is a full-time double bass faculty member at the New England Conservatory of Music in Boston, Massachusetts, where he also serves as artistic director of the Chamber Orchestra. He is also a faculty member at Yale School of Music in New Haven, Connecticut. He has held master classes worldwide, including the Hartt School, Rice University, the Juilliard School, the Manhattan School of Music, Mannes College, and the Toho Gakuen School of Music in Tokyo, Japan. Many of Palma's double bass students are featured members of orchestras and ensembles worldwide.
