= Norman Herzberg =

American bassoonist (1916–2007)

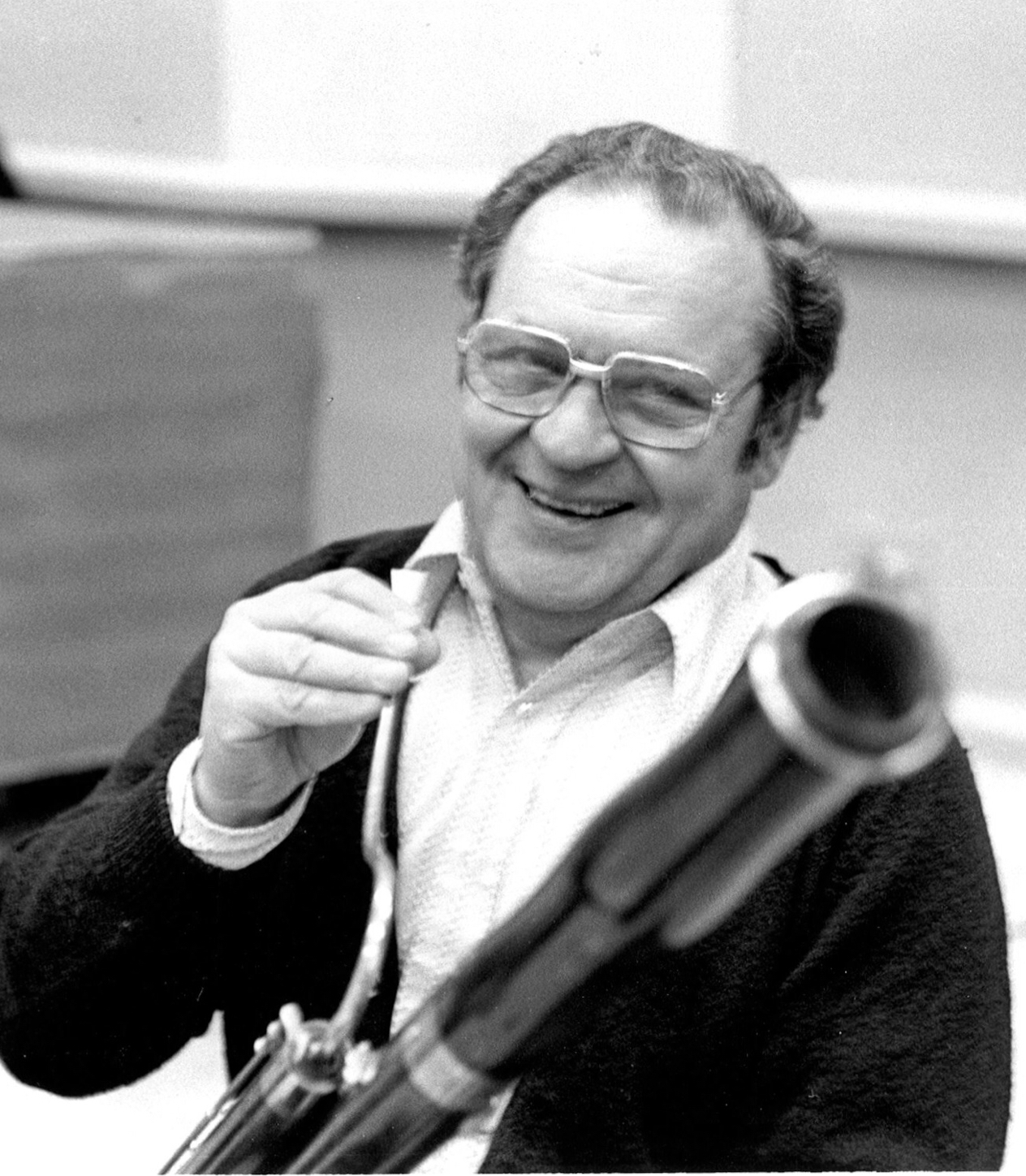
- Herzberg in 1982

Background information
- Born: March 24, 1916; Cleveland, Ohio
- Died: February 4, 2007 (aged 90) Encino, California
- Occupations: Performer; studio musician; professor
- Instrument: Bassoon
- Years active: 1937-1991

Norman Herzberg (March 24, 1916 – February 4, 2007) was an American bassoonist and professor of bassoon at the University of Southern California. Considered to be one of the most important bassoonists of his generation, Herzberg is well known for popularizing the bassoon reed style of his teacher, Vincent Pezzi. In modern day, Herzberg's adaptations in bassoon reed making are some of the most prevalent across the United States. Herzberg was the principal bassoonist of the St. Louis Symphony, a founding member of the Los Angeles Chamber Orchestra, and a major studio freelancer, namely for Warner Brothers Studios. He was an inaugural faculty member at the Aspen Music Festival and School, and the Music Academy of the West, where he taught for 20 seasons.

== Biography ==
=== Early life ===
Herzberg was born in 1916 in Cleveland, Ohio. Herzberg's mother insisted that he study music in the Cleveland Public School District, to which he reluctantly agreed. Herzberg first played the soprano saxophone and later taught himself the bassoon in order to join the school orchestra. In his teenage years, Herzberg went on to win the first prize in the American Bandmasters Competition and was awarded a full scholarship to study bassoon at the National Music Camp in Interlochen, Michigan. There, he met bassoonist Vincent Pezzi and conductor Howard Hanson, who persuaded him to study bassoon at the Eastman School of Music. While at Eastman, Herzberg's name was given to conductor Vladimir Golschmann, who was looking to recruit a new second bassoon player for his St. Louis Symphony. Herzberg auditioned on Pezzi's recommendation but was unable to accurately play the bassoon part from Till Eulenspiegel's Merry Pranks and was not hired for the job. After he graduated from Eastman in 1937, Herzberg left for New York City on a scholarship with the National Orchestra Association of New York. This program introduced Herzberg to bassoonist Simon Kovar, with whom he studied privately for several years. In 1939, Golschmann heard auditions for a second bassoonist again in New York, and Herzberg was hired for the position. Herzberg initially declined the job offer before Kovar persuaded Golschmann to promote Herzberg to principal bassoon contingent upon a successful 1939-1940 season. While studying with Kovar, Herzberg became acquainted with Kovar's eldest daughter, Leah. The couple married in 1939, just before Herzberg departed to St. Louis.

=== Career ===
Herzberg went on to play in the St. Louis Symphony from 1939-1942, before being drafted into the Coast Guard at the advent of World War II. Herzberg was assigned the Academy Band in New London, Connecticut until the conclusion of the war in 1945. He spent the remainder of the 1945 season freelancing on Broadway in New York City, before returning to his job in St. Louis at the beginning of the 1946 season. After the birth of his first two children in the late 1940's, Herzberg made the difficult decision to move his family to Los Angeles in pursuit of higher paying jobs in the Los Angeles film studios. After a year of turmoil in 1953, Herzberg began to receive regular contract work with Warner Brothers Studios in 1954. That same year, Herzberg taught the first class of bassoonists at the University of Southern California. In 1968, he founded the Los Angeles Chamber Orchestra with other major studio players in response to demand for public music performances in Los Angeles.

=== Teaching and reed making ===
Herzberg is considered to be one of the first to develop a pragmatic curriculum for the bassoon. Most notable was his comprehensive system of scales, which utilized the full range of the bassoon in combination with every possible pattern of articulation. Herzberg was also among the first to advocate the practice of long tones, routinely playing sustained pitches in sequence to develop a steady airflow and a strong sense of legato. Herzberg is also credited with popularizing the depression of the left hand octave vents to bring clarity of articulation to pitches A3-D4. Herzberg acquired this technique from bassoonist Frederick Moritz, who first learned it in Berlin decades before its popularization. These octave vents are now commonly referred to as "speaker keys" or "flick keys" though Herzberg believed the term flick trivialized their importance. In a 1997 interview he said,

"I teach the bassoon primarily. I wasn't brought anywhere to teach phrasing of orchestral passages. I was brought because I knew how to trill b-flat; I knew the instrument, it was assumed. And gradually I evolved a discipline. It was; it is my ambition to teach people how to play the instrument. If I'm the bassoon teacher you can't expect me to just teach music, I've got to teach how you play the instrument"

Herzberg often expressed frustration with his former teachers, stating that Vincent Pezzi would "let him get away with anything" and that Simon Kovar had "absolutely no system (...) and would teach whatever came into his mind on a given day."

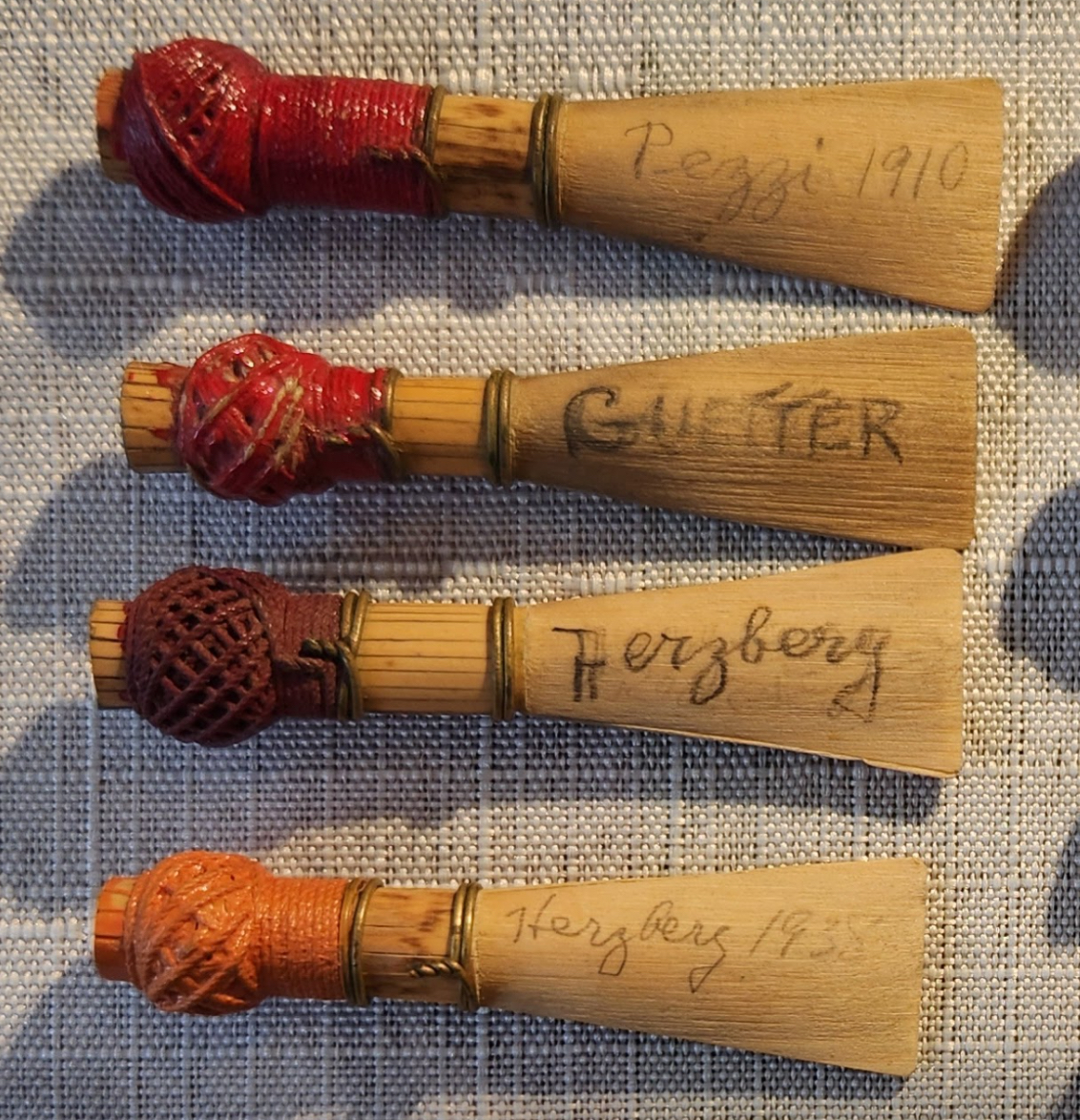
Reeds by Vincent Pezzi and Walter Guetter compared to two reeds by Herzberg (1964 top/1938 bottom)

Herzberg also had a tremendous impact in the development of bassoon reed making. While his early reeds were nearly identical to that of Vincent Pezzi, Herzberg developed his own preferences throughout his lifetime. Most notably, he widened the base and tip of Pezzi's reed shape and increased the distance between the first and second wires. He also developed a new style of internal bevel to enlarge the reed's tip opening without narrowing the tube. In regards to his reed shape, Herzberg stated,

"Wide shapers do well in the lower half of the bassoon, from middle Bb (top of the staff) down. Even then, one has to be very careful in trimming that the E (third space) does not go flat, and the C# in the staff does not collapse. However, wide shapers carry burdens above the aforementioned Bb. The middle C is often too low as are the notes going higher. The middle D, the Eb, the E and the F have a tendency to be low. Those notes can be helped with the wire adjustment and my bevel procedures"

=== Later life ===
Herzberg retired from performing and full-time teaching in 1991. He resigned from the University of Southern California faculty after administration informed him that he would not be permitted to dismiss a particular student from his studio. During his retirement Herzberg continued to present seminars and master classes in the United States and Canada. He remained active through submitting articles on reed making and bassoon playing to the International Double Reed Society. Herzberg died of leukemia on February 4, 2007. His former students organized a memorial service which was held on the campus of UCLA on May 27, 2007.

== Notable Herzberg students ==
- Angela Anderson Smith, second bassoon Philadelphia Orchestra 1997–present
- Bill Buchman, associate principal bassoon Chicago Symphony 1996–present
- James Compton, principal bassoon Omaha Symphony 1987–present
- Arlen Fast, contrabassoon New York Philharmonic 1996-2020
- Michele Grego, second bassoon Los Angeles Philharmonic 1996–present
- Fraser Jackson, contrabassoon Toronto Symphony Orchestra 1990–present
- Patricia Kindel, contrabassoon Los Angeles Philharmonic 1981-2018
- Ben Kamins, principal bassoon Houston Symphony 1981-2003, professor of bassoon at the Shepherd School of Music 1987–present
- Seth Krimsky, principal bassoon Seattle Symphony 1986–present
- Hugh Michie, second bassoon Cincinnati Symphony 1990–present
- Kenneth Munday, principal bassoon Los Angeles Chamber Orchestra 1976-2020
- Roger Nye, second bassoon New York Philharmonic 2005–present
- James Rodgers, contrabassoon Pittsburgh Symphony 2001–present
- Marcus Schoon, contrabassoon Detroit Symphony 1992-2024
- David Sogg, co-principal bassoon Pittsburgh Symphony 1989–present
- Kristen Sonneborn, principal bassoon Naples Philharmonic 1995–present
- Michael Sweeney, principal bassoon Toronto Symphony 1989-2022
- Charles Ullery, principal bassoon Saint Paul Chamber Orchestra 1975-2017
- Scott Walzel, associate principal bassoon Dallas Symphony 1992–present
- Abe Weiss, principal bassoon Rochester Philharmonic 1970-2011
- Bob Williams, principal bassoon Detroit Symphony 1974-2022
