= LLP Group =

Czech software service company

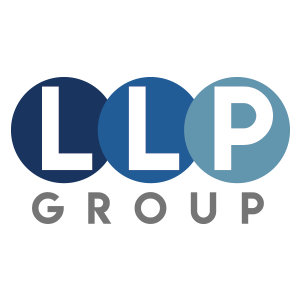
- Formerly: London Logic Praha
- Industry: Software Consultancy
- Founded: September 28, 1992; 34 years ago in Prague, Czech Republic
- Founders: Adam Bager
- Headquarters: Prague, Czech Republic

LLP Group is an international software services company founded in the Czech Republic, specializing in business software consulting, software development, and ERP implementations. It provides consulting and software services to both local and international companies throughout the world. LLP Group has completed over 1000 projects in more than 90 countries worldwide.

== History ==
LLP was founded in 1992 in Prague. Other branches followed in Central Europe: Slovakia (est. 1995), Hungary (est. 1996), Romania (est. 1997), and Bulgaria (est. 2000). LLP expanded by implementing Infor SunSystems for international companies (such as Kraft Foods, Unilever, Johnson & Johnson, Shell, BP, PwC, KPMG, the Parliament of the United Kingdom, etc.) in multiple locations throughout the Central European region. It later expanded westward in Luxembourg (est. 2008), Mexico (est. 2009, now partner office), and the United States (est. 2012).

In 2010, the group was divided into three divisions: LLP Group, LLP Dynamics, and systems@work. The LLP Dynamics division was sold at the end of 2013 to Xapt Hungary.

In August 2014, LLP became a Microsoft Gold Partner. LLP is the Microsoft Awards winner for CRM projects in 2018, 2016, and 2015 in the Czech Republic. In early 2023, LLP achieved Microsoft Solutions Partner designations for Business Applications and for Modern Work, which replaced the Gold Partner status.

In January 2016, LLP's customer relationship management division turned into a separate company, LLP CRM.

In February 2020, LLP Group established LLP Technology to offer technical and development services using Infor OS, a cloud operating platform. LLP Technology also develops custom software and integrates it with other ERP systems, in addition to providing consulting on hardware and software.

In 2021, LLP Group became a Hexagon Partner, reselling and implementing EAM software. Today named Octave Attune EAM software.

In February 2024, LLP Group was awarded the Channel Partner of the Year at the Infor SunSystems FY23 EMEA & Americas channel partner awards.

In February 2026, LLP Group announced a strategic merger with Elazur, a French and Switzerland-based expert in EAM/CMMS solution integration. Elazur becomes a key entity within LLP Group, forming a premier technological powerhouse in the EAM sector.

== Products ==
LLP's core business is the implementation of SunSystems from Systems Union, now Infor. In the late 1990s and in the 2000s, as markets developed, LLP expanded its portfolio of products to include other ERP products, such as Microsoft Dynamics, NAV and AX, customer relationship management products such as Pivotal and Dynamics 365, asset management solution Octave Attune EAM and business intelligence products such as Infor EPM. The company also set out to develop a professional services automation product, time@work, from which a web-based expense management tool, expense@work, and forms management tool, forms@work, were later derived. Systems@work was eventually split off into a separate company, systems@work.

From April 2024, LLP Group also resells Yooz, the cloud-based Purchase-to-Pay (P2P) automation solution.

In 2026, LLP Group added to its product portfolio eZyPark, a storage and parking optimisation tool, and ePlanner, a maintenance scheduling solution. Through its French subsidiary, Elazur by LLP Group, the company also resells CARL Source, a Computerised Maintenance Management System (CMMS).

== Sponsorship ==
LLP Group supported BUMI, a humanitarian and development charity working in the Katanga province of the Democratic Republic of the Congo, for several years. BUMI provides shelter and education for vulnerable children, including orphans and street children.

For a number of years LLP Group provided support for the Theatre School for Children at Risk, held annually in August at the Katya Vancheva Orphanage, Shiroka Laka, in the Rhodope Mountains of Bulgaria.

LLP Group was the main sponsor of the Talent roku (Talent of the year) musical competition whose laureates are Michal Sťahel (1999), Jana Vonášková-Nováková (2000), Jordana Palovičová (2001) and Václav Vonášek (2002). Talent roku was based on the BBC Young Musician of the Year and the prize was one year at the Royal College of Music, in London.
