= The Florentiner March =

1907 concert march by Julius Fučík

United States Navy Band, 2006

The Florentiner March (German: Florentiner Marsch), Op. 214, is a concert march composed in 1907 by Julius Fučík (1872–1916), a Czech composer and military bandmaster. The work was first published in 1908 and remains one of Fučík's most frequently performed compositions. Owing to his prolific output of marches and other light orchestral works, Fučík has often been referred to as the "Bohemian Sousa", a comparison with the American march composer John Philip Sousa (1854–1932).

== Title and background ==
The title Florentiner translates as "Florentine", referring to the Italian city of Florence. The composition is subtitled Grande marcia Italiana. Despite its Italian designation, there is no documented evidence that the march was inspired by a specific event in Florence. As was common in the late nineteenth and early twentieth centuries, composers often adopted evocative geographical titles to lend a romantic or exotic character to their works. Fučík's originally named the march La Rosa di Toscana.

== Performance and reception ==
Since its publication, the Florentiner March has become a standard work in the repertoire of concert bands and wind ensembles. It is performed regularly in formal concerts and at ceremonial or festive public events, reflecting its enduring popularity within the wind band tradition.
