= Geoffrey Grey =

British classical composer (1934–2023)

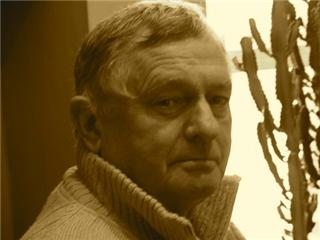
- Grey in 2005
- Born: 26 September 1934; Gipsy Hill, London, England
- Died: 2023 (aged 88–89); Dorchester, Dorset, England
- Education: Royal Academy of Music
- Occupation: Composer

Geoffrey Grey (26 September 1934 – 2023) was a British classical composer.

== Biography ==
Geoffrey Grey was born in Gipsy Hill and lived on the edge of Dartmoor until the onset of the second world war, when he was sent to Scotland to live with his paternal grandparents.

A career as a concert violinist had been envisaged and encouraged by his parents as he had shown a precocious interest in the violin at a very early age. Edinburgh, however, was markedly unfriendly to the English in those days, and its indigenous juvenile population openly hostile to any child with artistic pretensions.

In spite of this he eventually went to the Royal Academy of Music and studied violin, composition, piano and conducting. His composition teachers were William Alwyn, Benjamin Frankel and later, in Paris, Nadia Boulanger.

In 1959 he went to New Zealand where he freelanced as a violinist for a time until he was appointed Tour Musical Director of the NZ Opera Company. He had a number of early pieces broadcast by the NZBS and returned to England in 1960.

He now had a family to provide for and took the job of Director of the Suffolk Rural Music School. This only lasted for a year and then he moved to London where he lived and freelanced as a violinist for the next forty years.

He held a number of principal positions over this period with some of the major orchestras and continued to compose for many different combinations of instruments. He was very active in London musical life and gave many recitals of contemporary music as well as his own compositions.

He played for the ballet, musicals and pop concerts and on a number of occasions toured with the Lindsay Kemp Theatre Company as violist, pianist & percussionist.

In 1992 he went to the Netherlands, working there for a year.

In 1996 in went to live first of all in Cornwall and then Margate where he concentrated almost exclusively on composing.

In March, 2003, after his friend Edwin Carr died, he contacted the oboist Dominique Enon to make the piano transcription of the Oboe Concerto which the composer dedicated to this oboist before the latter's death. This meeting turned out to be fruitful and Grey subsequently returned to France to become involved with the Radio France and in particular the conducting of Kurt Masur. He also maintained contact with Dominique Enon for to whom he has dedicated a work for oboe and piano. Their meeting has also resulted in the publishing of some of his works in France by Gilles Manchec, publishing director of Armiane in Versailles

Grey later lived in Dorset and in 2007 had three new works published. He died in Dorchester in 2023.

== Works ==
=== Works by year ===
- 1956 The Tinderbox, for narrator, violin & piano
- 1958 Piano Sonata in C
- 1958 The Pied Piper of Hamelin, opera for children
- 1959 A Christmas Cantata, for boys/girls voices and string orchestra
- 1961 Violin Sonata No. 1
- 1962 Six Cavalier Songs, for high voice and piano
- 1963 Capriccio, for string orchestra
- 1964 Sarabande, ballet for Sadlers Wells Opera Ballet
- 1964 Patterns, ballet for Sadlers Wells Opera Ballet
- 1964 Cock Robin, Betty Botter, lullaby for voices (children's pieces)
- 1967 Dance-Game, for orchestra
- 1967 Serenade, for double wind quintet (for Portia Wind Ensemble)
- 1967 String Quartet No. 1
- 1968 Sonata for Brass (3 trumpets and 3 trombones)
- 1968 Aria for flute (or oboe) and piano
- 1969 Inconsequenza, for percussion quartet
- 1969 Flowers of the Night for violin and piano
- 1969 Quintet for woodwinds
- 1969 Notturno, for string quartet
- 1969 Autumn '69 (The Prisoner) for 4 instrumental ensembles
- 1969 John Gilpin, for solo SATB and wind quintet
- 1970 Divertimento Pastorale, for brass quintet
- 1970 The Autumn People (Chamber Orchestra)
- 1970 Sarabande for Dead Lovers, suite from the ballet Sarabande, fir orchestra
- 1971 A Mirror for Cassandra, for piano, violin, oboe, horn and cello
- 1971 12 Labours of Hercules, for narrators and orchestra
- 1972 Songs, for instruments (septet)
- 1972 Saxophone Quartet
- 1972 Concerto Grosso No. 1 for string orchestra
- 1972 Ceres, ballet by Antony Tudor
- 1973 Summons to an Execution, Dirge, Celia, for voice & piano, voice and string orchestra
- 1974 A Dream of Dying, for soprano and ensemble
- 1975 March Militaire No. 1 for brass and percussion
- 1975 Three Pieces for two pianos
- 1975 Concertante for 2 solo violins and chamber orchestra
- 1975 Tryptych, for large orchestra
- 1976 Cello Sonata
- 1977 Dreams of a Summer Afternoon, Violin, Horn & Piano)
- 1978 Song from Death's Jest Book, for soprano and piano)
- 1980 Variations, for orchestra
- 1981 12 Studies for Piano, book 1
- 1981 Suite, for strings
- 1983 Clarinet Sonata
- 1984 Contretemps, for wind quartet
- 1984 Three Songs, for soprano, clarinet and piano
- 1985 A Morning Raga, for double bass and piano
- 1986 Viola Sonata, (comm. Roger Chase)
- 1988 Sonata in Four Movements, for violin and piano
- 1988 Partita, for trumpet and piano
- 1988 Concerto Grosso No 2, for solo violin and string orchestra (comm. Blackheath Strings)
- 1989 10 Easy Pieces, for piano, violin, horn and oboe
- 1996 A Bit of Singing & Dancing, for orchestra (comm. Dartford S/O)
- 1996 Quintet "The Pike", for piano, violin, viola, cello, and double bass (Hermes Ensemble, Rosslyn Hill)
- 1997 Scherzo Strepitoso, for orchestra
- 1997 4 Bagatelles, for 2 flutes
- 1998 Cantar de la Siguiriya Gitana, for tenor and piano trio (comm. Jose Guerrero)
- 1999 Flowers of the Night, arr. for flute and piano
- 1999 Preamble & 5 Variations, for bassoon and piano (comm. John Orford)
- 2000 Partita, for trumpet and piano, arr. fortrumpet and strings
- 2001 De Vinetas Flamencos, for tenor and piano (comm. Jose Guerrero)
- 2002 Tango alla Sonata, for cor Anglais and piano
- 2002 Threnody, Capriccio & Anthem, for oboe choir
- 2003 The Weather in the East, for flute, clarinet, bassoon and piano
- 2004 A Scene from Old Russia, for piano trio
- 2004 The Man in the Moon, for a capella SATB
- 2004 Shine, Candle, Shine, for a capella SATB
- 2005 The Screech-Owl (Bestiary), for piano solo
- 2005 The Disaster, theatre piece for multiple ensembles
- 2005 Aubade, for oboe and piano (comm. Domimique Enon)
- 2006 Concertino de Printemps, for piano and orchestra
- 2007 Trio Concertante, for piano, oboe and bassoon (comm. John Orford)

=== Arrangements ===
- The Seasons, (Tchaikovsky) for String Quartet
- Selection of works by Grieg for String Quartet
- Tartini Solo Sonatas for Violin & Harp
- Victorian Salon Pieces for Piano Trio
- Irish Suite for String Quartet
- Francesa da Rimini (Tchaikovsky) for 16-piece orchestra
- Sicilian Vespers Ballet Music (Verdi) for 16-piece orchestra
