= Václav Vonášek =

Václav Vonášek (born 1980) is a Czech classical bassoonist.

He began to study the bassoon at the Conservatory in Plzeň (teachers Ladislav Šmídl and Matouš Křiváček). He went on to study at the Academy of Performing Arts in Prague (František Herman and Jiří Seidl). He gained yearlong scholarship to study at the Royal College of Music in London where he studied with Andrea de Flammineis and Martin Gatt.

Vaclav Vonasek is the founder and member of the Prague Bassoon Band, he has collaborated with his wife, violinist Jana Vonášková-Nováková and Barocco sempre giovane ensemble. From 2006–2016 he was a member of the Czech Philharmonic Orchestra. Since March 2016 he is contrabassoonist of the Berlin Philharmonic Orchestra.

== Prizes ==
- 2002 Czech-Slovak competition Talent of The Year 2002, sponsored by LLP Group
- 2004 International Double Reed Society Competition – 1st Prize
- 2005 For outstanding studying results, he was awarded the Price of Czech Ministry for Education and he won International Bassoon Competition in Łódź in Poland
- 2008 ARD Competition in Munich – 3rd Prize
- 2009 Prague Spring International Music Competition – 1st Prize
