= Mother———! Mother———!! =

Studio album by Clark Terry
- Released: 1980
- Recorded: February 2, 1979 at RCA Studios, New York City
- Genre: Jazz
- Label: Pablo Today – 2312-115
- Producer: Norman Granz

Clark Terry chronology
The Effervescent (1979)	Mother———! Mother———!! (1980)	Ain't Misbehavin' (1980)

Mother———! Mother———!! is a 1980 album by Clark Terry featuring Zoot Sims, of a jazz symphony composed by Charles Schwartz. Terry and Sims are accompanied on the album by an octet, the Contemporary Chamber Ensemble and the soprano Joan Heller.

== Reception ==
Professional ratings
Review scores
Source	Rating
Allmusic	3/5 stars

Ken Dryden reviewed the album for AllMusic and wrote that "Although Terry is in great form, the music will be rather challenging for most fans of Terry's jazz recordings to enjoy, and Heller's vocals prove to be more of a distraction than a complementary factor. The front cover is unusually bland for Pablo, filled with the composer's liner notes instead of photos from the studio session. ...this record is worth picking up if found at a reasonable price by serious fans of Clark Terry, but the typical jazz listener can safely bypass this release."

== Track listing ==
1. First Movement: "Celebration" – 8:52
2. Second Movement: "Jubilation" – 11:15
3. Third Movement: "Exultation" – 7:12
4. Fourth Movement: "Revelation" – 9:55

All compositions by Charles Schwartz.

== Personnel ==
- Donald Palma – double bass
- Christopher Finckel – cello
- Anand Devandra -clarinet
- Arthur Weisberg – conductor
- Clark Terry – flugelhorn, trumpet, vocals
- Susan Palma-Nidel – flute
- Gilbert Kalish – keyboards
- Anthony Cinardo, Raymond DesRoches – percussion
- Zoot Sims – soprano saxophone, tenor saxophone
- Jimmy Maxwell – trumpet
- Jean Ingraham – violin
- Joan Heller – vocals
- Norman Granz – producer
