= Jennie Bain Wilson =

American hymn writer (1856–1913)

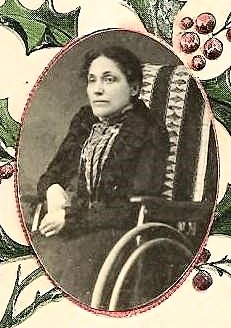
- A 1907 Christmas card featuring hymn writer Jennie Bain Wilson.
- Born: Mary Jane Bain Wilson; November 13, 1856; South Whitley, Indiana
- Died: September 3, 1913 (aged 56); South Whitley, Indiana
- Other name: Jennie Wilson
- Occupations: hymn writer, poet, church worker
- Years active: 1880s-1913

Mary Jane "Jennie" Bain Wilson (November 13, 1856 – September 3, 1913) was an American hymn writer.

== Early life ==
Wilson was born on a farm in South Whitley, Indiana in 1856, the younger daughter of Robert Wilson and Mary Frances Russell Wilson. She survived typhoid fever as a little girl, and her spine was damaged by the bacterial infection ("typhoid spine" was first described in the medical literature many years later). She used a wheelchair from childhood.

== Career ==
Wilson wrote thousands and published hundreds of Christian hymns; she was known as the "Fanny Crosby of the West". Her hymn "Hold to God's Unchanging Hand" (1905) was especially popular in the 1910s and 1920s.

Wilson was also the author of the slogan of Fort Wayne, Indiana, "Fort Wayne with Might and Main", taking the $50 prize in the city's slogan contest, out of 25,000 submissions.

== Personal life ==
After 1902 Wilson lived with her married older sister. She sought some surgical treatment of her paralysis in Indianapolis, and "improved somewhat". Wilson died in 1913, aged 57 years, from kidney disease, in South Whitley, Indiana.
