= Sol Schoenbach =

American bassoonist and teacher (1915–1999)

Sol Schoenbach (né Sol Israel Schoenbach; 1915 – 25 February 1999) was an American bassoonist and teacher.

== Career ==
Schoenbach was a student of the distinguished bassoonist Simon Kovar. He studied at the New York University, and held honorary doctorates from Temple University and the Curtis Institute of Music. Schoenbach held the position of staff bassoonist for the CBS orchestra from 1932 until 1937. In 1937, he became principal bassoonist of the Philadelphia Orchestra, a position he held until 1957 when Bernard Garfield took over. During this time, he was also a member of the Philadelphia Woodwind Quintet.

In 1957, after retiring from the Philadelphia Orchestra, until 1981, Schoenbach was the executive director for the Settlement Music School. He was also the president of the International Double Reed Society from 1981 until 1984. Schools at which he taught include the Curtis Institute of Music, the Berkshire Music Center and the New England Conservatory of Music.

Schoenbach has received many awards throughout the years, including the Philadelphia Award (1975), the Founders award from the Philadelphia Music Alliance (1994), the Samuel Rosenbaum Award from the National Guild of Community Schools of the Arts, the Philadelphia Orchestra’s Hartman Kuhn Award, and the Philadelphia Young Audiences Award for Outstanding Service in Arts Education to Youth presented by the American Foundation for the Science of Creative Intelligence. Mr. Schoenbach’s solo bassoon playing was featured in the 1957 film noir “The Burglar”, starring Dan Duryea and Jayne Mansfield, with music by composer Sol Kaplan.
