= Karen Clarke =

Karen Clarke may refer to:

- Karen Clarke (Australian athlete) (born 1990), Australian javelin thrower at the 2010 Oceania Athletics Championships
- Karen Clarke (netball) (born 1972), Australian netball player
- Karen Clarke (sprinter) (born 1971), Canadian track and field sprinter
