= Michael Chapman (bassoonist) =

British musician (1934–2005)

Michael Chapman (3 August 1934 – 21 July 2005) was a British classical bassoonist and reed-maker.

His playing, characterized by an ability to weave long, sustained, singing lines and deliver powerful utterances, has influenced subsequent generations of British bassoonists. He studied at the Royal College of Music in London with Archie Camden and Vernon Elliott. After graduation, he joined the London Philharmonic Orchestra in 1959 as second bassoon to Martin Gatt. In 1962, he won an Arts Council scholarship and left the London Philharmonic to study with the great Italian bassoonist Enzo Muccetti at the Arrigo Boito Conservatory in Parma. Upon returning to England, he served as principal bassoonist of the newly formed Northern Sinfonia, where he stayed for almost 15 years. In 1978, he became principal bassoonist of the Royal Philharmonic Orchestra and he held this post for the next 21 years. He taught privately, and at University of York, and Trinity College of Music in London. He made the first recording of Elgar's Romance for bassoon and orchestra Op. 62 with the Northern Sinfonia conducted by Neville Marriner. Joubert's Bassoon Concerto was commissioned for Chapman. He founded his own reed-making company, applying a skill he learned from Muccetti.
