= Rodney Slatford =

British musician (born 1944)

Rodney Slatford OBE (born 18 July 1944) is an English contemporary double bass player and teacher. He was the principal bass player of the Midland Sinfonia, Academy of St Martin in the Fields, and English Chamber Orchestra, founder (with Amelia Freedman) of the Nash Ensemble, and has been a principal player in other early music ensembles. He is also a publisher of sheet music for double bass. He had studied with Adrian Beers and wrote his obituary in The Independent.
