= Michael Collins (clarinetist) =

British musical artist (born 1962)

- Born: 27 January 1962 (age 64); Isleworth, West London, United Kingdom
- Education: Royal College of Music
- Occupations: Classical clarinetist; Conductor
- Website: www.michaelcollinsmusic.com

Michael Collins (born 27 January 1962) is a British clarinetist and conductor. One of the foremost clarinetists of his generation, he has served as the principal of the Philharmonia Orchestra and London Sinfonietta. Collins has performed widely as a soloist and played on over 35 recordings on several record labels. He has also served as the conductor of several orchestras and was the principal conductor of the City of London Sinfonia from 2010 to 2018.

== Early life ==
Collins was born on 27 January 1962 in Isleworth, West London. He began playing the clarinet aged seven after attending a London Symphony Orchestra performance of Rimsky-Korsakov's Scheherazade suite, which inspired him to take up the instrument. He went on to study clarinet at the Royal College of Music as a youth under David Hamilton and Thea King. Collins had previously attempted to learn the cello and violin but did not fit the instruments well. At the age of 16, he won the 1978 BBC Young Musician woodwind prize and performed at the competition's inaugural grand finale. Aged 18, he briefly studied at the Juilliard in New York City with Stanley Drucker before deciding to return to studying under King. After his return, Collins was invited to join the Nash Ensemble and the London Sinfonietta in 1981.

== Career ==
Collins has served as the principal clarinet of several orchestras, including the Philharmonia Orchestra (1987–1995) and London Sinfonietta. He also performs as a soloist and as part of chamber ensembles. Solo performances have included work with the NHK Symphony Orchestra, Sydney Symphony Orchestra, Leipzig Gewandhaus Orchestra, City of Birmingham Symphony Orchestra and BBC Symphony Orchestra. He has performed at Carnegie Hall and the Proms, having made his debuts in 1982 and 1984 respectively. Collins has a large repertoire which includes several works by British composers, like Elgar, Vaughan Williams, and Britten. He has also commissioned and performed various works by modern composers; pieces premiered by Collins include Adams' Gnarly Buttons, Turnage's Riffs and Refrains, and Elliott Carter's Clarinet Concerto. Collins plays on Yamaha clarinets and has advised the company on their designs. He has been described as "one of the best clarinettists walking the planet" by The Times and a "virtuoso" by The Sydney Morning Herald. In 2019, he appeared in the Australian Broadcasting Corporation's Legends series, where he was described as "one of the top clarinettists on the world stage at th[at] moment".

Collins taught at the Royal College of Music from 1985 to 1995. He has served as the principal conductor of the City of London Sinfonia (2010–2018) and has guest conducted the BBC Symphony Orchestra, Philharmonia Orchestra, Melbourne Symphony Orchestra, Tasmanian Symphony Orchestra, Zurich Chamber Orchestra and London Mozart Players, of which he was the artistic director from 2021 to 2023. Collins is the founder of the London Winds, a chamber ensemble with which he toured Europe and North America.

== Personal life ==
Collins was once married to Isabelle van Keulen; they had two children. In 2017, Collins underwent a successful surgery to treat bowel cancer. His favourite piece to perform is the Mozart Clarinet Concerto.

== Awards and honours ==
- Concert Artists Guild (1982)
- Grammy Award for Best Instrumental Soloist(s) Performance (with orchestra) – nominated for the 43rd Annual Grammy Awards
- Instrumentalist of the Year (2007) – Royal Philharmonia Society
- Member of the British Empire (2015)
- AllMusic Year in Review: Favourite Classical Instrumental Albums (2020)

== Recordings ==
Title	Other performers	Label	Year	Ref(s)
Bartok: Sonata for unaccompanied violin / Two Rhapsodies / Romanian Folk Dances / Contrasts	Krysia Osostowicz, Susan Tomes	Hyperion	1993	
Edward German: Merrie England	The Williams Singers, and His Orchestra	EMI	1995	
Virtuosi: Michael Collins	Michael Collins and Kathryn Stott	EMI	1997	
Elliott Carter: Symphonia "Sum fluxae pretium spei" / Clarinet Concerto	Oliver Knussen and BBC Symphony Orchestra	Deutsche Grammophon	1999	
Chamber Music Trios	Stephen Hough and Steven Isserlis	RCA	1999	
Schubert: Octet	Collins and friends	BBC Music Magazine	1999	
Copland: Sextet / Piano Quartet; Vitebsk: 3 String Quartet Pieces	Vanbrugh Quartet and Martin Roscoe	ASV	2000	
Mozart and Beethoven: Clarinet Concertos	Mikhail Pletnev and Russian National Orchestra	Deutsche Grammophon	2000	
Edward German: Merrie England	The Williams Singers, and His Orchestra	EMI	2002	
Gregson: Blazon / Violin Concerto / Clarinet Concerto / Stepping Out	Martyn Brabbins, Olivier Charlier and Michael Collins	Chandos	2003	
Spohr: Clarinet Concertos Nos. 1 & 2	Robin O'Neill and Swedish Chamber Orchestra	Hyperion	2005	
Mozart: Serenades	London Winds	Onyx	2006	
Schubert: Octet / Shepherd on the Rock	Collins and friends	Wigmore Hall Live	2007	
Herbert Howells: To Chosen Hill...	Andrew West and Lyric Quartet	Métier	2007	
Spohr: Clarinet Concertos Nos. 3 & 4	Robin O'Neill and Swedish Chamber Orchestra	Hyperion	2008	
The Virtuoso Clarinet	Piers Lane	Chandos	2010	
The Lyrical Clarinet	Michael McHale	Chandos	2011	
Weber: Clarinet Concertos Nos. 1 & 2 / Clarinet Concertino / Horn Concertino	Stephen Stirling and City of London Sinfonia	Chandos	2012	
British Clarinet Sonatas, Vol. 1	Michael McHale	Chandos	2012	
British Clarinet Concertos, Vol. 1	BBC Symphony Orchestra	Chandos	2012	
Mozart, Copland, Kats-Chernin: Works for Clarinet and Orchestra	Swedish Chamber Orchestra	Chandos	2013	
British Clarinet Sonatas, Vol. 2	Michael McHale	Chandos	2013	
The Virtuoso Clarinet, Vol. 2	Michael McHale	Chandos	2014	
Brahms: Clarinet Trio / Cello Sonatas Nos. 1 and 2	Ian Brown and Paul Watkins	Chandos	2014	
Brahms, Reinecke: Clarinet Sonatas	Michael McHale	Chandos	2015	
British Clarinet Concertos, Vol. 2	BBC Symphony Orchestra	Chandos	2016	
The Lyrical Clarinet, Vol. 2	Michael McHale	Chandos	2016	
Hana wa Saku (Flowers will Bloom)	Charlotte de Rothschild and City of London Sinfonia	Nimbus	2016	
Reger: Clarinet Sonatas	Michael McHale	Chandos	2017	
Piccolo Concerto Grosso: Matthias Mueller, Wolfgang Amadé Mozart	Matthias Müller and Zurich Chamber Orchestra	Neos	2017	
Crusell: The Three Clarinet Concertos / Introduction et air suédois	Swedish Chamber Orchestra	Chandos	2018	
Richard Strauss: Burleske / Romanze / Duett-Concertino / Violin Concerto	Tasmin Little, Michael McHale and Julie Price	Chandos	2019	
The Lyrical Clarinet, Vol. 3	Michael McHale	Chandos	2020	
Vaughan Williams: Symphony No. 5; Finzi: Clarinet Concerto	Philharmonia Orchestra	BIS	2020	
La Clarinette Parisienne	Noriko Ogawa	BIS	2021	
Brahms: 3 Sonatas	Stephen Hough	BIS	2021	
Mozart: Clarinet Concerto / Quintet; Birchall: Concerto	Robin O'Neill, Philharmonia Orchestra and Wigmore Soloists	BIS	2022	
Clarinet Trios: Mozart, Schumann, Bruch, Stravinsky	Isabelle van Keulen and Michael McHale	BIS	2022	
Arnold: Clarinet Concerto No. 1 / Philharmonic Concerto / Divertimento No. 2 / Etc.	Rumon Gamba and BBC Philharmonic Orchestra	Chandos	2023	
