= Robert Williams (bassoonist) =

American bassoonist (born 1946)

Bob Williams
- Born: December 24, 1946 (age 79); Tucson, Arizona
- Occupation: Classical Musician
- Instrument: Bassoon
- Years active: 1972-present
- Formerly of: Detroit Symphony

Robert Williams is an American bassoonist and former principal bassoon of the Detroit Symphony Orchestra from 1974 to 2020.

== Life and career ==
Robert Williams first began playing bassoon in junior high school and attended Catalina High School in Tucson, Arizona. He went on to study at the University of Arizona where he studied bassoon with Wendel Jones, creator of the first mass produced bassoon reed. During the summers Williams studied bassoon with Norman Herzberg, and with Leonard Sharrow at the Aspen Music Festival and School. He briefly attended the University of Southern California as a graduate student.

While a student at the University of Arizona, Williams won the principal bassoon position with the Tucson Symphony Orchestra. Shortly after his graduation, he won the principal bassoon position with the Winnipeg Symphony Orchestra. In 1974, at the age of 24, he won the principal bassoon position of the Detroit Symphony Orchestra. Throughout his career, Williams played guest principal bassoon with the Minnesota Orchestra and Boston Symphony.

Williams was bassoon faculty for many summers at the Aspen Music Festival, and was interim faculty at the University of Michigan and Michigan State University. He also taught bassoon at Wright State University, the Grand Teton Music Festival, Claremont Music Festival, and the Utah Music Festival. Williams gave bassoon masterclasses at Tanglewood, the Music Academy of the West, and the University of Arizona. Williams' playing is well recorded and can be heard on Detroit Symphony recordings with Antal Doráti on the Decca label, as well as recordings with Neeme Järvi on the Chandos label. Throughout his career Williams was a supporter of Fox Products, the only American manufacturer of professional bassoons. Williams played on a Fox bassoon in the Detroit Symphony throughout the late 2000s and early 2010s.

== Later life ==
Williams is married to former Detroit Symphony English Horn Treva Womble. They retired and moved to Williams' home town of Tucson in 2020. In retirement they run Womble-Williams Double Reeds, a home business that specializes in products for oboe and bassoon.
