= Vincent Pezzi =

Italian-American bassoonist (1887–1966)

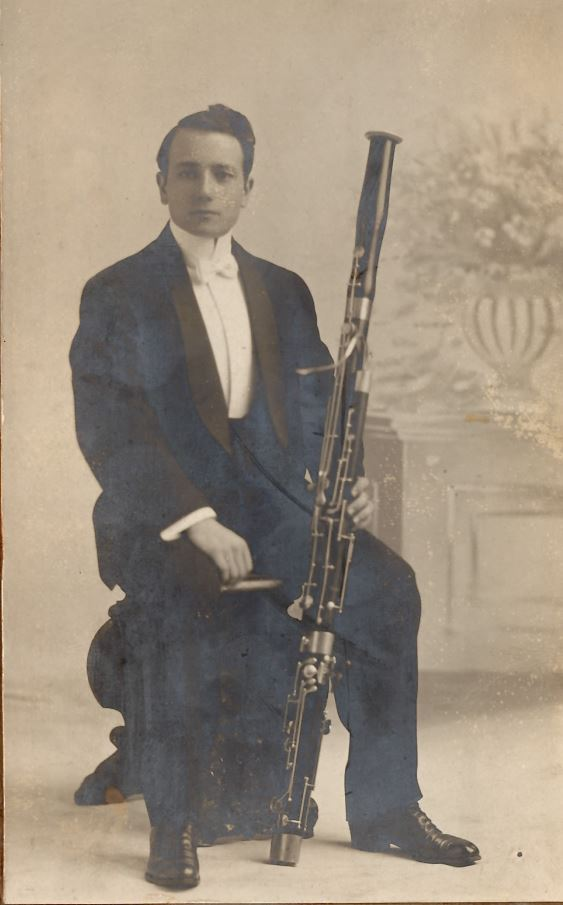
- Vincent Pezzi in 1910

Background information
- Born: November 4, 1887; San Severo, Italy
- Died: July 15, 1966 (aged 78) Washington, DC
- Genre: Orchestral
- Occupations: Performer; professor
- Instrument: Bassoon
- Years active: 1905-1966

Vincenzo "Vincent" Pezzi (November 4, 1887 – July 15, 1966) was an Italian-American bassoonist and inaugural professor of bassoon at the Eastman School of Music. During his career, Pezzi held positions with the Banda Bianca and Banda Rossa of San Severo, the Minnesota Orchestra, the Detroit Symphony, and the Rochester Philharmonic. Pezzi was an instructor at the National Music Camp (now Interlochen Arts Camp) and was one of the first teachers of Heckel (German) bassoon in the United States.

== Biography ==
=== Early life ===
Pezzi was born in 1887, in San Severo, Italy and was the oldest of four children. When he was in his late teens, Pezzi was sponsored by his uncle, Enrico Pezzi, to study bassoon. Pezzi began his studies with Arduino Pucciarell at the Giuseppe Verdi School of Music in San Severo. Once proficient at the bassoon, Pezzi joined the Banda Bianca of San Severo. Pezzi would tour Italy and the United States with both the Banda Bianca and the Banda Rossa of San Severo. During this time Pezzi continued his studies with Eduardo Buccini at the Royal Conservatory at Naples, before emigrating to the United States in 1908.

=== Immigration to America ===
While on tour in 1908, Pezzi won the position of second bassoon with the Minneapolis Symphony Orchestra (now the Minnesota Orchestra) under maestro Emil Oberhoffer. Shortly after obtaining U.S. Citizenship in 1916, Pezzi was drafted into World War I. Pezzi served in the Navy Band at the Great Lakes Naval Station alongside future Philadelphia Orchestra principal bassoonist Walter Guetter.

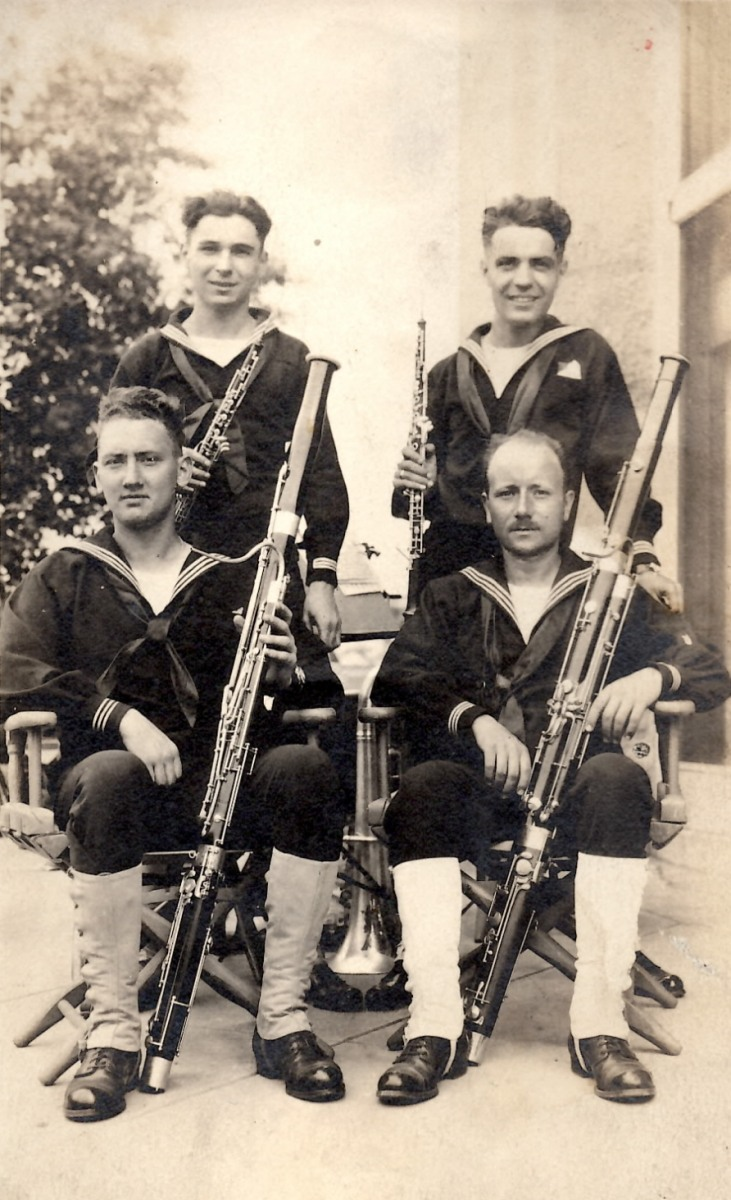
Pezzi and Geutter in 1917

As a part of their Military duties, Pezzi and Guetter served on the USS George Washington when it took U.S. president Woodrow Wilson to Europe at the conclusion of WWI. With his military service over in 1918, Pezzi began looking for work in a professional orchestra. In 1919, he was hired to play second bassoon in the newly re-formed Detroit Symphony Orchestra under music director Ossip Gabrilovich. Pezzi served in this capacity as second bassoon throughout the 1920’s. In 1922 he participated in the first ever radio broadcast of a symphony orchestra with Gabrilovich conducting, and Artur Schnabel at the piano. Due to the financial impact on the Detroit Symphony during the Great Depression, Pezzi and many other Detroit Symphony musicians lost employment in 1929. After the loss of work in Detroit, Pezzi was recruited to join the Rochester Philharmonic by flutist and former colleague Leonardo DeLorenzo. In 1932, he became principal bassoon of the Rochester Philharmonic which at the time was tied to the position of professor of bassoon at the Eastman School of Music. Pezzi participated in numerous tours and recordings during his time in Rochester, including playing under the baton of Leonard Bernstein and Igor Stravinsky

=== Influence ===
Pezzi is widely known for being one of the first major teachers of Heckel bassoon. He first taught private students during his time in the Minneapolis Symphony, and is most often associated with his tenure as professor of bassoon at the Eastman School of Music. He began teaching in the 1932 academic year in Eastman School of Music in concurrence with his appointment to the Rochester Philharmonic. As a dedicated educator, Pezzi was notable for his “interest in the individuality of each student and his devotion to tone quality and expressive, vocal playing.” Drawing upon his European education and the influence of American contemporaries such as Walter Geutter and Marcel Tabuteau, Pezzi cultivated a widely successful bassoon studio, training a number of the prominent bassoonists of the 20th century.

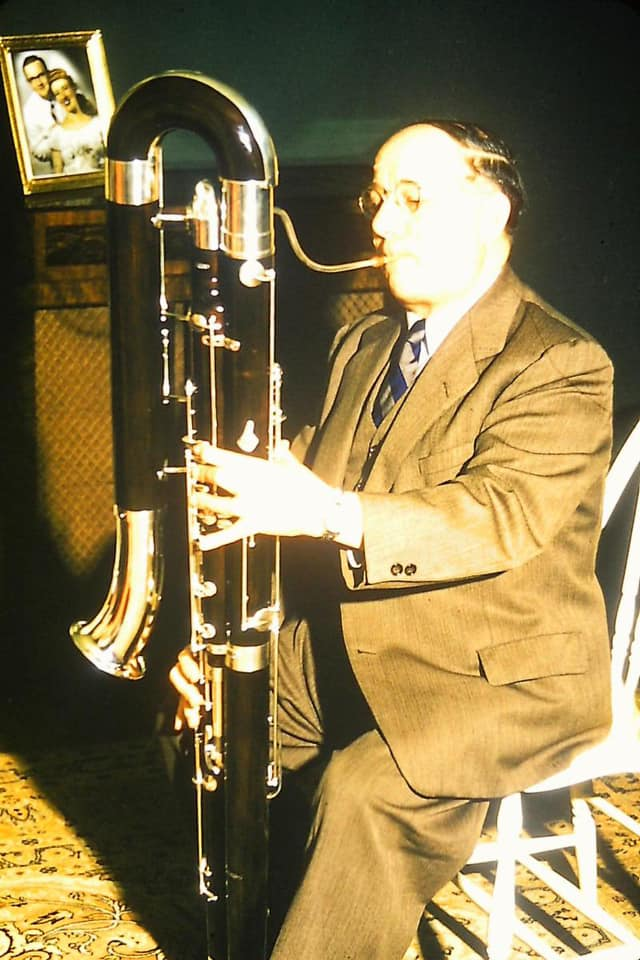
Pezzi in his studio at the Eastman School of Music

Pezzi retired in 1954 and was succeeded by his student, K. David van Hoesen. During the 1930s, Pezzi served as a private instructor at the National Music Camp (now Interlochen Arts Camp) alongside Howard Hanson and other Eastman School of Music faculty members. Pezzi recruited a number of the young musicians he trained at Interlochen to study bassoon at Eastman.

=== Bassoon Reed Making ===
Pezzi spent much of his life researching the construction and improvement of bassoon reeds. While in Detroit, Pezzi worked with his student Clarence Barrington, a machinist, to create new tools for the efficient and consistent production of bassoon reeds. These included: an electric (automated) shaper, electric profiler, as well as specialty pliers and mandrels. This was the first recorded instance of the production of automated tools for bassoon reed making. The reeds produced by this machinery were heavy, with just the bark removed from the blade. Students would then scrape the reed in attempt to imitate the sound and control of dynamics that they were accustomed to hearing from Pezzi.

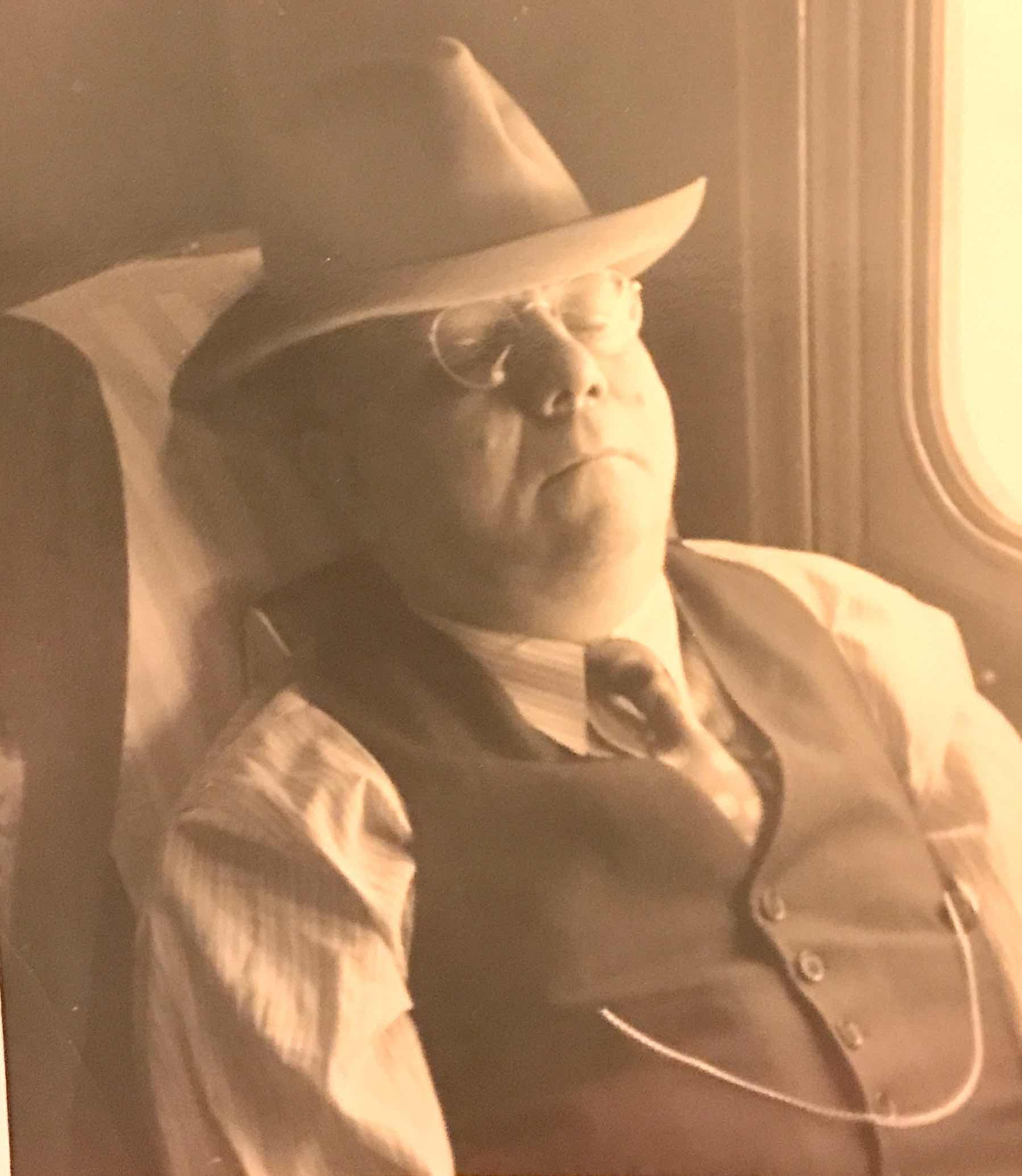
Pezzi on a train in 1949

These “Barrington blanks” were used by Pezzi and students at Eastman as late as 1956. Students at Eastman would begin with these blanks and then finish the reed by emulating Pezzi's sound and style of scrape. Pezzi would assist his students with reeds he found unsatisfactory. Pezzi maintained a collection of the reeds of his students and other professionals until his death. The collection is maintained by George Sakakeeny, current professor of bassoon at the Eastman School of Music.

=== Switch from French to German Bassoon ===
During his early years, Pezzi learned both French and Heckel (German) bassoon. At the time, the French bassoon was the predominant instrument being used in professional orchestras throughout Italy, France, and the United States. As the German system gained popularity in the US, Pezzi made the switch and purchased a Heckel bassoon made in 1921. In 1939 Pezzi purchased Heckel #8331, the bassoon he would go on to play for the remainder of his career. This instrument was originally a “world system” bassoon, which sounds identical to a Heckel bassoon, but with the left hand keywork of a French bassoon. The instrument was originally built with a “french” whisper key for the left hand pinky, and a single C/D vent. It has since been converted to a full Heckel system bassoon, and is played professionally in New York City. It has received maintenance from Hans Moennig, Shane Weiler, and Frank Marcus.

=== Later life ===
Pezzi retired from the Eastman School of Music in 1954 and remained active as a musician, attending concerts and teaching private lessons. He died in Washington, D.C. on July 14, 1966, and is buried at Arlington National Cemetery.

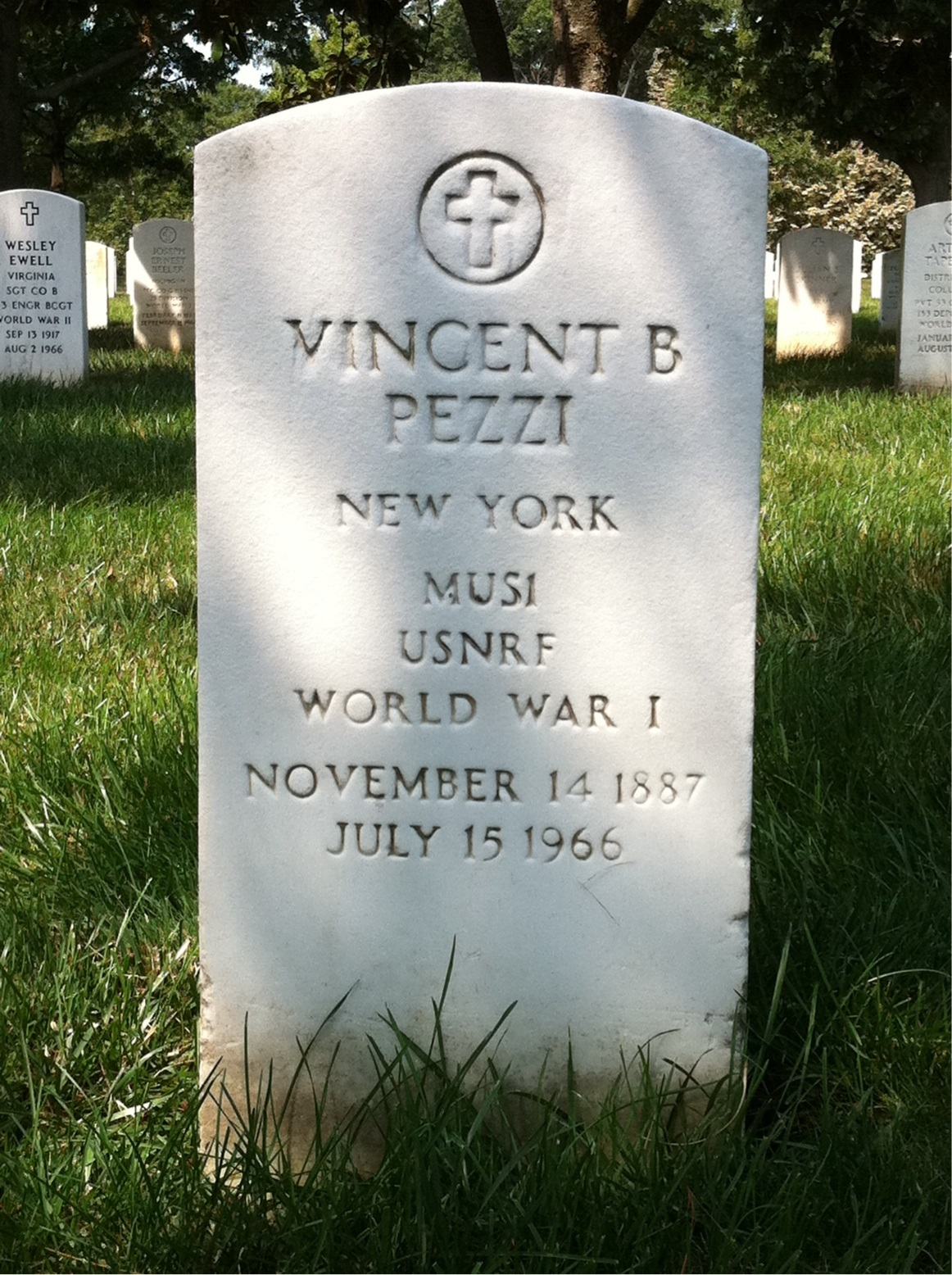
Pezzi's tombstone in Arlington National Cemetery

== Notable Students of Vincent Pezzi ==
- K. David Van Hoesen, principal bassoon Rochester Philharmonic and second professor of bassoon at the Eastman School of Music
- Norman Herzberg, principal bassoon Los Angeles Chamber Orchestra, St. Louis Symphony, and professor of bassoon at the University of Southern California
- George Goslee, principal bassoon Cleveland Orchestra 1946-88
- Willard Elliot, principal bassoon Chicago Symphony 1964-96
- Manuel Zegler, principal bassoon New York Philharmonic 1958-1981
- Kenneth Pasmanick, principal bassoon National Symphony (Washington, DC) 1947-97
- Loren Glickman, New York City bassoon pedagogue, Chamber Society of Lincoln Center
- Walter Green, principal bassoon Utah Symphony 1950-52, Indianapolis Symphony 1952-56, San Francisco Symphony 1956-83
- Ronald Phillips, associate principal bassoon Cleveland Orchestra 1963-2001
