= South Whitley, Indiana =

- Town
- Town of South Whitley
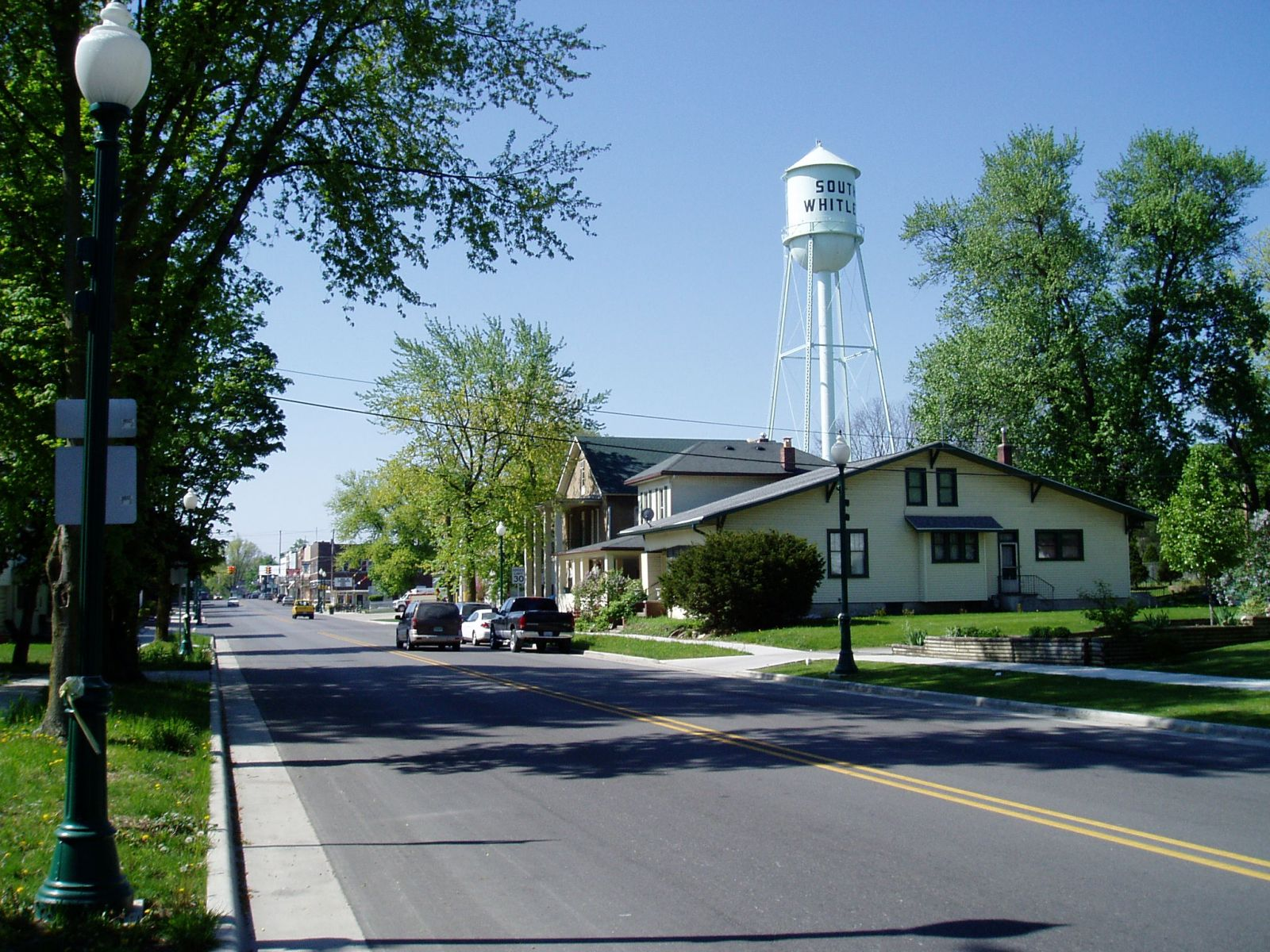
- South Whitley, State Street and water tower

- Location of South Whitley in Whitley County, Indiana.
- Coordinates: 41°04′51″N 85°37′26″W
- Country: United States
- State: Indiana
- County: Whitley
- Township: Cleveland

Area
  - Total: 0.87 sq mi (2.25 km^{2})
  - Land: 0.85 sq mi (2.21 km^{2})
  - Water: 0.019 sq mi (0.05 km^{2})
- Elevation: 804 ft (245 m)

Population (2020)
  - Total: 1,818
  - Density: 2,134.1/sq mi (823.97/km^{2})
- Time zone: UTC-5 (Eastern (EST))
  - Summer (DST): UTC-4 (EDT)
- ZIP code: 46787
- Area code: 260
- FIPS code: 18-71612
- GNIS feature ID: 2397668
- Website: www.southwhitley.gov

South Whitley is a town in Cleveland Township, Whitley County, in the U.S. state of Indiana. As of the 2020 census, South Whitley had a population of 1,818. It is a town in the Midwestern tradition of red brick buildings and tree-lined streets.

== History ==
South Whitley was originally called Springfield, and under the latter name was laid out in 1837. A post office was established that year under the name Whitley. The post office was renamed to South Whitley in 1842, and still operates today.

== Geography ==
According to the 2010 census, South Whitley has a total area of 0.91 square miles (2.36 km^{2}), all land.

== Demographics ==
Historical population
Census	Pop.	Note	%±
1880	408		—
1890	720		76.5%
1900	1,113		54.6%
1910	1,176		5.7%
1920	1,074		−8.7%
1930	1,102		2.6%
1940	1,118		1.5%
1950	1,299		16.2%
1960	1,325		2.0%
1970	1,362		2.8%
1980	1,575		15.6%
1990	1,482		−5.9%
2000	1,782		20.2%
2010	1,751		−1.7%
2020	1,818		3.8%
U.S. Decennial Census

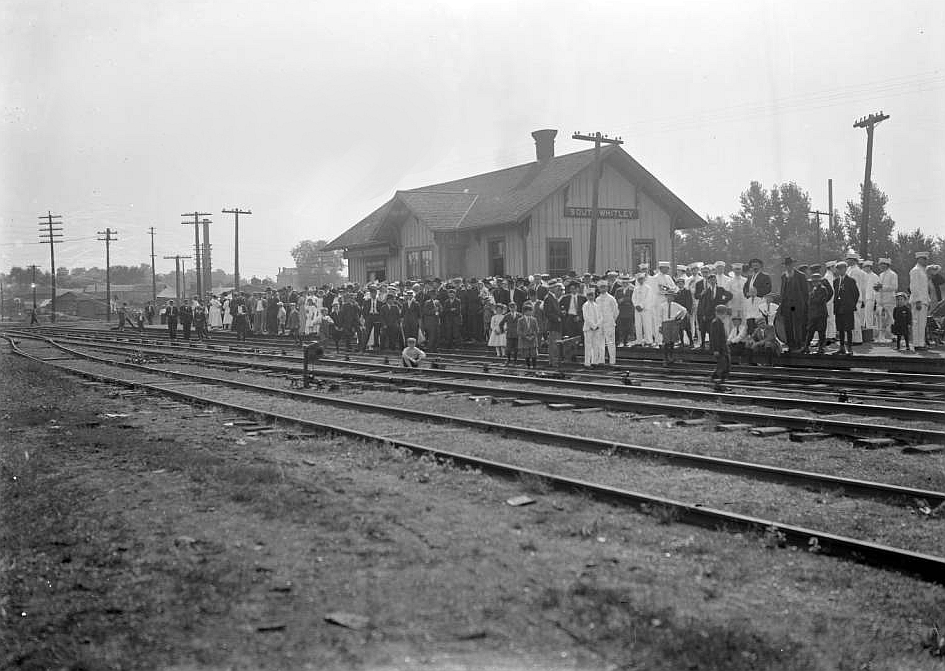
Railroad depot in South Whitley, 1910s

=== 2020 census ===
As of the 2020 census, South Whitley had a population of 1,818. The median age was 37.5 years. 23.7% of residents were under the age of 18 and 14.5% of residents were 65 years of age or older. For every 100 females there were 100.9 males, and for every 100 females age 18 and over there were 96.2 males age 18 and over.

0.0% of residents lived in urban areas, while 100.0% lived in rural areas.

There were 768 households in South Whitley, of which 31.0% had children under the age of 18 living in them. Of all households, 43.0% were married-couple households, 21.1% were households with a male householder and no spouse or partner present, and 25.5% were households with a female householder and no spouse or partner present. About 32.6% of all households were made up of individuals and 12.5% had someone living alone who was 65 years of age or older.

There were 817 housing units, of which 6.0% were vacant. The homeowner vacancy rate was 1.0% and the rental vacancy rate was 6.3%.

Racial composition as of the 2020 census
Race	Number	Percent
White	1,717	94.4%
Black or African American	13	0.7%
American Indian and Alaska Native	6	0.3%
Asian	1	0.1%
Native Hawaiian and Other Pacific Islander	0	0.0%
Some other race	11	0.6%
Two or more races	70	3.9%
Hispanic or Latino (of any race)	32	1.8%

=== 2010 census ===
As of the census of 2010, there were 1,751 people, 729 households, and 482 families living in the town. The population density was 1,924.2 inhabitants per square mile (742.9/km^{2}). There were 820 housing units at an average density of 901.1 per square mile (347.9/km^{2}). The racial makeup of the town was 98.0% White, 0.2% African American, 0.1% Native American, 0.2% Asian, 0.4% from other races, and 1.1% from two or more races. Hispanic or Latino of any race were 1.9% of the population.

There were 729 households, of which 33.3% had children under the age of 18 living with them, 48.3% were married couples living together, 12.2% had a female householder with no husband present, 5.6% had a male householder with no wife present, and 33.9% were non-families. 27.8% of all households were made up of individuals, and 12.5% had someone living alone who was 65 years of age or older. The average household size was 2.39 and the average family size was 2.92.

The median age in the town was 37.6 years. 25% of residents were under the age of 18; 8.5% were between the ages of 18 and 24; 26.3% were from 25 to 44; 25.3% were from 45 to 64; and 14.9% were 65 years of age or older. The gender makeup of the town was 48.3% male and 51.7% female.

=== 2000 census ===
As of the census of 2000, there were 1,782 people, 742 households, and 482 families living in the town. The population density was 2,423.2 inhabitants per square mile (935.6/km^{2}). There were 791 housing units at an average density of 1,075.6 per square mile (415.3/km^{2}). The racial makeup of the town was 99.16% White, 0.22% African American, 0.11% Native American, 0.06% Asian, 0.06% Pacific Islander, 0.17% from other races, and 0.22% from two or more races. Hispanic or Latino of any race were 0.51% of the population.

There were 742 households, out of which 31.0% had children under the age of 18 living with them, 50.1% were married couples living together, 11.1% had a female householder with no husband present, and 35.0% were non-families. 30.5% of all households were made up of individuals, and 14.8% had someone living alone who was 65 years of age or older. The average household size was 2.40 and the average family size was 2.97.

In the town, the population was spread out, with 26.8% under the age of 18, 9.1% from 18 to 24, 29.0% from 25 to 44, 18.7% from 45 to 64, and 16.3% who were 65 years of age or older. The median age was 35 years. For every 100 females, there were 92.0 males. For every 100 females age 18 and over, there were 89.0 males.

The median income for a household in the town was $35,114, and the median income for a family was $42,438. Males had a median income of $34,653 versus $21,221 for females. The per capita income for the town was $19,766. About 7.0% of families and 8.2% of the population were below the poverty line, including 12.1% of those under age 18 and 7.2% of those age 65 or over.

== Education ==
The town is served by Whitko Community School Corporation and contains South Whitley Elementary and Whitko Jr/Sr High School.

The town has a lending library, the South Whitley Community Public Library.

== Media ==
- WIOE-FM 101.1 is licensed to South Whitley, but is located in nearby Warsaw.

== Notable people ==
- Will Cuppy — humorist and journalist
- Hugo Fox — principal bassoonist in Chicago Symphony Orchestra
- Janie Fricke — country music singer
- Albert Fredrick Ottomar Germann — scientist and academic
- Jennie Bain Wilson — writer of Christian hymns
