= Marin Valtchanov =

Marin Valtchanov (1949–2017; Valchanov on some recordings; Bulgarian: Марин Вълчанов) was a Bulgarian bassoonist and composer of classical music.

He has composed chamber music, chamber operas, film scores and works for symphony orchestra and for string orchestra. His works have been performed in Europe, Australia Asia, the United States and Latin America.
