= Karen Clarke (netball) =

Australian netball player

Personal information
- Born: 1 February 1972 (age 54)
- Height: 1.72 m (5 ft 8 in)

Netball career
- Playing position: C
Years	Club team	Apps
1997–2007	Queensland Firebirds	
- Updated on 2009-03-12

Karen Clarke (born 1 February 1972) is an Australian netball player. Clarke formerly played with the Queensland Firebirds during the Commonwealth Bank Trophy. Clarke also played in New Zealand's National Bank Cup in 2005, playing for the Canterbury Flames. She retired from the Firebirds after the 2007 season and has since become a firefighter with the Queensland Fire and Rescue Service.
