= Benjamin Kamins =

American bassoonist (born 1952)

- Born: December 13, 1952 (age 73); Los Angeles, California
- Occupations: Classical Musician; Professor
- Instrument: Bassoon
- Years active: 1972-present

Benjamin Kamins (born December 13, 1952) is an American bassoonist and professor of bassoon at the Shepherd School of Music of Rice University. Kamins is widely known for continuing the pedagogical legacy of his teacher, Norman Herzberg.

== Life and career ==
Kamins was born in Los Angeles and began playing the bassoon at age 11. His first introduction to the instrument was through an antique bassoon that his brother found at a thrift store. The instrument was not functional, but its unusual appearance inspired Kamins to take up learning the bassoon. Kamins attended Fairfax High School, in West Hollywood. At this time he began his studies with Norman Herzberg. Kamins studied bassoon at the Music Academy of the West in the summer of 1968 and 1969. He continued his studies with Herzberg at the University of Southern California before winning his first job in 1972 as Associate Principal bassoon of the Minnesota Orchestra. Kamins was 19 at the time of his appointment. During his time in Minneapolis, Kamins taught bassoon at St. Olaf College and Macalester College.

In 1981, Kamins won the position of principal bassoon with the Houston Symphony. He served as professor of bassoon at the University of Houston from 1981 to 1986. In the height of his playing career, Kamins appeared as guest principal bassoon with the New York Philharmonic, the Los Angeles Philharmonic, the Boston Symphony Orchestra, and the Pittsburgh Symphony. Kamins retired from the Houston Symphony in 2003. He was bassoon faculty at the Aspen Music Festival and School from 2002-2003 and principal bassoon of the Sun Valley Symphony from 2005-2015.

Kamins was named associate professor of bassoon at the Shepherd School of Music in 1986, and was promoted to full professorship in 2003. Since his retirement from the Houston Symphony, Kamins has focused his efforts towards building the Rice bassoon studio into a world class learning environment. The program developed a top reputation throughout the early 2000s, with alumni securing positions in orchestras such as the Metropolitan Opera Orchestra, Chicago Symphony, Minnesota Orchestra, Detroit Symphony, St. Louis Symphony, Baltimore Symphony, Seattle Symphony, Oregon Symphony, Dallas Symphony, and the Houston Symphony.
