= Ursula Leveaux =

Scottish classical bassoonist

Ursula Leveaux is an English classical bassoonist. She is Principal Bassoon with the City of London Sinfonia and the Academy of Ancient Music; and is currently the bassoonist of the Nash Ensemble. Leveaux was Principal Bassoon with the Scottish Chamber Orchestra from 1987 to 2007. She has made numerous recordings, including of Sir Peter Maxwell Davies' bassoon concerto, which was written for her. In 2020, she was a judge in the wind and brass final of the 68th Royal Over-Seas League Annual Music Competition.
