= Charles Cracknell =

British bassoonist and pedagogue

Charles W. P. Cracknell MBE (13 September 1915 – 1 May 1997) was a British classical bassoonist and pedagogue. He taught at the Royal Northern College of Music in Manchester where his students included John Orford, Helen Peller, Steve Marsden, Laurence Perkins, and Jeremy Ward. He was the principal bassoonist of the Hallé Orchestra for 31 years, from 1946 in 1977. He was made an Associate of the Royal Academy of Music in 1972 and awarded an MBE in 1980. He gave the British premiere of Richard Strauss' Duet concertino for clarinet and bassoon with Pat Ryan in 1949.
