= Volodymyr Apatsky =

Volodymyr Apatsky Володимир Апатський
- Born: August 29, 1928; Minsk, Belarusian SSR, Soviet Union
- Died: September 27, 2018 (aged 90); Kyiv, Ukraine
- Genres: Classical
- Instrument: Bassoon

Volodymyr Mykolaiovych Apatsky (Note: Ukrainian: Володимир Миколайович Апатський, romanized: Volodymyr Mykolaiovych Apatskyi; Belarusian: Уладзімір Апацкі, romanized: Uladzimir Apatski) (29 August 1928 – 27 September 2018) was a Ukrainian bassoonist and teacher who was a professor at the National Music Academy in Kyiv. He was principal bassoonist for the Kyiv theater of opera and ballet symphony orchestra until 1981, second prize winner of the contest of the Belarusian musicians-performers on wind instruments (1952), Winner (and premiums) Soviet All-Union Festival of Youth (1957). Apatsky was born in Minsk on 29 August 1928, and died on 27 September 2018, at the age of 90.

== Sources ==
- S. Bolotin — Glossary of musicians-performers on wind instruments
