= Tamás Benkócs =

Hungarian classical bassoonist

Tamás Benkócs (born 1972) is a Hungarian classical bassoonist.

== Biography and career ==
Tamás Benkócs is an acclaimed Hungarian bassoonist recognized globally for his artistry and extensive discography. He studied at the Franz Liszt Academy of Music in Budapest, Hungary, where he studied with Laszlo Hara, Jozsef Vajda and Tibor Fulemile. His remarkable talent was recognized early; at just twenty years old and still a student, he was appointed principal bassoonist of the Budapest Festival Orchestra. In 1998, he moved to Asia to become the founding principal bassoonist of the Malaysian Philharmonic Orchestra before returning home to Hungary in 2004 to resume his principal chair with the BFO.

As a soloist, Benkócs is celebrated for his rich tone, deep musicality, and masterful technical command. His concert career spans the globe, with performances across Europe, North and South America, and Asia, as well as regular appearances with the Festival Academy Budapest. A highly prolific recording artist, he has appeared on over 40 CDs, Most notably, he recorded five volumes of Antonio Vivaldi's complete bassoon concertos for the Naxos a monumental series that has served as an educational cornerstone for generations of young players.
