= Simon Kovar =

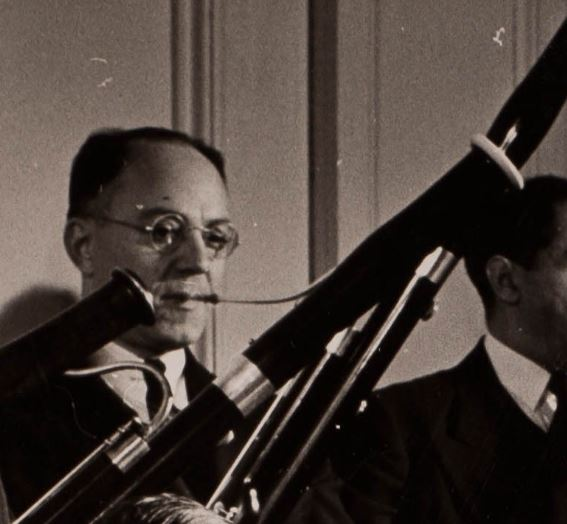
- Simon Kovar in 1930

Background information
- Born: 15 May 1890; Vilnius, Russia
- Died: 17 January 1970 (aged 79) Encino, California, U.S.
- Instrument: Bassoon

Simon Kovar (May 15, 1890 – January 17, 1970) was a Russian-American bassoonist and one of the first renowned teachers of bassoon in the United States.

== Biography ==
Born Sĭmon Kovarskí in Vilnius, Russia, Kovar initially enrolled at the St. Petersburg Conservatory as a violin student studying with Leopold Auer. In 1914, Kovar began learning the bassoon with the aim of joining a military band. This move was intended to help avoid being drafted into World War I. Kovar narrowly avoided entrance to the military, and was sent to Riga to play bassoon in the People's Opera Orchestra.

Kovar immigrated to the United States in June 1922 and settled in New York City. Shortly thereafter, he was appointed second bassoonist with the newly reformed New York Philharmonic, on the condition that he take regular lessons with the orchestra’s principal bassoonist, Benjamin Kohon. Kovar developed into a consistent player during a time of unrest in the philharmonic, occasionally playing first bassoon under the baton of Willem Mengelberg and Bruno Walter. In 1938 Kovar purchased Heckel bassoon #8254, which he would go on to play for the remainder of his career. Kovar was head of bassoon faculty at the Juilliard School of Music and also taught bassoon at Columbia University, the Curtis Institute of Music, Manhattan School of Music, Mannes College of Music, and the Conservatoire de musique du Québec. In 1957, Kovar published his 24 Daily Studies for Bassoon which became well known as an essential method book. Kovar also published edited versions of the concert studies for bassoon by Ludwig Milde, and Julius Weissenborn.

In 1955, Kovar moved to Encino, California, to live near his daughter Leah Herzberg and son-in-law Norman Herzberg. He continued teaching bassoon privately and at the Music Academy of the West through the late 1960's. Kovar died on January 17, 1970 from complications related to emphysema. He was survived by his wife Rose Kovar, and daughters Eleanor Imber and Leah Herzberg.

== Notable Students ==
- Norman Herzberg, professor of bassoon at the University of Southern California 1953-1991
- Bernard Garfield, principal bassoon Philadelphia Orchestra 1957-2000
- Sol Schoenbach, principal bassoon Philadelphia Orchestra 1937-1957
- Arthur Weisberg, professor of bassoon at the Yale School of Music, Jacobs School of Music.
- Stan Getz, jazz saxophonist
- Ray Pizzi, jazz multi-instrumentalist
