= Arthur Weisberg =

American musician, conductor, composer and author

Arthur Weisberg (April 4, 1931 – January 17, 2009) was an American clarinetist, bassoonist, conductor, composer and author.

== Biography ==
Weisberg was born in New York City. He attended The High School of Music & Art, majoring in bassoon and studying with Simon Kovar, and graduating in 1948.

Soon after leaving Juilliard, he secured the principal chairs with the Houston and Baltimore Symphony Orchestras and second bassoon with the Cleveland Orchestra, before coming back to New York City. After pursuing study of conducting with Jean Morel, he again returned to the bassoon as principal for Symphony of the Air as well as bassoonist of the New York Woodwind Quintet for 14 years.

Weisberg conducted the Milwaukee Symphony Orchestra, the New York Philharmonic, and the Sjaellands and Aalborg Symphonies of Denmark. Weisberg founded and conducted the Contemporary Chamber Ensemble.

Weisberg also taught extensively, holding posts at the Juilliard School, State University of New York at Stony Brook, Yale School of Music, Manhattan School of Music, and Indiana University's Jacobs School of Music.

He recorded several renderings of 20th-century music, such as from Schoenberg (Pierrot Lunaire, Erwartung), Varèse, Messiaen, and contemporary American composers (e.g., Elliott Carter, Stefan Wolpe, and George Crumb), mostly with the Contemporary Chamber Ensemble, the Orchestra of the 20th Century, and the Ensemble 21. Weisberg also conducted Charles Schwartz's 1979 jazz symphony Mother ! Mother ! with Clark Terry and Zoot Sims.

== Books ==
Weisberg also authored two books: The Art of Wind Playing (G. Schirmer) and Performing 20th Century Music-a Handbook for Conductors and Instrumentalists (Yale University Press) as well as composed and edited numerous scores, including the Bach Cello Suites.

== "Future Bassoon" system ==
Weisberg introduced a new bassoon which he claimed was "absolutely unable to crack. Perfect slurs on the most problematic notes. Never having to flick again. Ease of fingering. Better quality and pitch on six of the worst notes. This is what the Weisberg System promises and delivers, and it does all of this automatically, with no new fingerings to learn." Because of Arthur Weisberg's death, Robert D. Jordan has inherited the mantel of president for "Future Bassoon" and has changed the name to "Weisberg Systems, LLC".

== Selected compositions ==
- Duo for Bassoon and Piano (1984)
- Piece for Viola Solo (1984)
- Piece for Piano (1984)
- Duo for Cello and Piano (1985)
- Trio for Violin, Cello and Piano (1985)
- Quintet for Clarinet and String Quartet (1986)
- Quintet for Horn and String Quartet (1986)
- Sonatina for Flute (1986)
- String Quartet No.1
- Music for Double Woodwind Quintet (1987)
- Two Pieces for String Quartet (String Quartet No.2) (1987)
- Duo for Violin and Piano (1988)
- Birthday Piece for Viola and Bassoon (1991)
- A Song and a Dance for Solo Bassoon (1992)
- From the Deep for Two Contrabassoons and Piano
- Concerto for Bassoon and Strings (1998)
- 15 Etudes for Bassoon Written in the Style of 20th Century Music (2004)
