= Karen Clark (bassoonist) =

Scottish classical bassoonist

Karen Clark (née Geoghegan) is a Scottish classical bassoonist and music educator. Clark appeared on the 2007 BBC Two reality show, Classical Star.

== Education ==
Clark began studying the bassoon at the age of twelve at West Calder High School in West Calder with Russell Cowieson, having previously played the violin since the age of five. She later studied at the Junior Academy of the Royal Scottish Academy of Music and Drama with Janet Bloxwich. She won the Gilbert Innes Prize for woodwind and the 2004 Concerto competition, and in 2004 and 2005 was awarded the Wolfson Scholarship.

Clark went on to study with John Orford at the Royal Academy of Music, where she received the Queen's Commendation for Excellence, the Louise Child Prize for Academic Achievement and the Irene Burcher Prize for Woodwind.

== Career ==
In 2006 Clark gave a recital on BBC Radio Scotland, and also performed the Hindemith Trumpet and Bassoon Concerto with John Wallace. She was a member of the National Youth Orchestra of Scotland for four years and in 2007 performed with Camerata Scotland NYOS Futures.

Clark was runner-up in the BBC Two programme Classical Star for her performance of the Hummel Bassoon Concerto with the City of London Sinfonia at LSO St Luke's. On 5 August 2009 she performed the Mozart Bassoon Concerto with the BBC Philharmonic at the BBC Proms.

Clark has made four solo and contributed to three other recordings with Chandos Records.

Since 2012, Clark has focused on music education, delivering Kodály method workshops in schools across Scotland. She teaches musicianship and conducting at the National Youth Choir of Scotland West Lothian Choir and musicianship at the Royal Conservatoire of Scotland Junior Conservatoire.
