= Nash Ensemble =

- Origin: London, England
- Genres: Classical, chamber, contemporary classical
- Years active: 1964–present

The Nash Ensemble of London is an English chamber ensemble. It was founded by Artistic Director Amelia Freedman and Rodney Slatford in 1964, while they were students at the Royal Academy of Music, and was named after the Nash Terraces around the academy. The Ensemble has won awards from the Edinburgh Festival Critics and the Royal Philharmonic Society, as well as a 2002 Gramophone Award for contemporary music.

In addition to their classical repertoire, the Ensemble performs works by numerous contemporary composers, including Richard Rodney Bennett, Harrison Birtwistle, Elliott Carter, Henri Dutilleux, Mark-Anthony Turnage, and Peter Maxwell Davies, and has given premiere performances of more than 200 works. It has issued many recordings, first with Graham Pauncefort’s CRD label, then a series of British music with Ted Perry's Hyperion with works by Bax, Bliss, Bridge, Britten, Lambert, Vaughan Williams, Walton and others. There are further issued by Virgin Classics, NMC, Black Box and Signum. The Nash has been the resident chamber ensemble at the Wigmore Hall in London from 2010.

Freedman died in July 2025. Simon Crawford-Phillips and Adrian Brendel are the current joint artistic directors.

== Personnel ==
=== Current members ===
- Adrian Brendel (cello)
- Clifford Benson (piano)
- Philippa Davies (flute)
- Richard Hosford (clarinet)
- Gareth Hulse (oboe)
- Ursula Leveaux (bassoon)
- Duncan McTier (double bass)
- Lawrence Power (viola)
- Marianne Thorsen (violin)
- Lucy Wakeford (harp)
- Richard Watkins (horn)

=== Former members ===
- Malin Broman (violin)
- Ian Brown (piano)
- Roger Chase (viola)
- Michael Collins (clarinet)
- Marcia Crayford (violin)
- Mark David (trumpet)
- Catherine Edwards (organ and piano)
- Skaila Kanga (harp)
- Liz Layton (violin)
- Bryn Lewis (harp)
- Simon Limbrick (percussion)
- Frank Lloyd (French horn)
- Robin Miller (oboe)
- Judith Pearce (flute)
- Leo Phillips (violin)
- John Pigneguy (horn)
- David Purser (trombone and sackbut)
- Laura Samuel (violinist) (violin)
- Rodney Slatford (double bass)
- Christopher Van Kampen (cello; died 1997)
- Paul Watkins (cello)
- James Watson (trumpet)
- Brian Wightman (bassoon)
