= Archie Camden =

British bassoonist

Archie Camden OBE (9 March 1888 – 16 February 1979) was a British bassoonist, pedagogue and soloist who won international acclaim. In 1968 The Times said "If the bassoon is no longer considered to be the orchestra's clown, its rehabilitation is the result of Mr Camden's work as an orchestral player, soloist and teacher".

== Early career and orchestras ==
Camden was born in Newark-on-Trent. He initially attracted attention as a pianist, joining the Royal Manchester (now Northern) College of Music at the age of 14 - but through Hallé Orchestra director Hans Richter he soon won the first bassoon scholarship, despite having played the bassoon for only a week prior to the audition. At the RNCM he studied with Egon Petri (piano) and Otto Schieder (bassoon). In 1906 he joined Schieder at the Hallé, replacing him as principal bassoon in 1914.

These were the Hallé's most famous days, the era of Richter, Hamilton Harty and Thomas Beecham. Harty in particular became a lifelong friend. During this period Camden also played with the Liverpool Philharmonic. In 1933 he moved to the BBC Symphony Orchestra under Adrian Boult, where he stayed until 1946 when - at the urgent request of Beecham - he became a founder member of the Royal Philharmonic Orchestra. There was also a spell at the Covent Garden Opera Orchestra.

== Teaching ==
As a teacher, he was a professor of the bassoon at the Royal Manchester College of Music from 1914 to 1933. He later taught at the Royal College of Music in London. His most famous students included Roger Birnstingl, Michael Chapman, Martin Gatt and William Waterhouse. Camden was the first prominent British bassoonist to change from the French bassoon to the smoother, more dry-toned German or Heckel Bassoon. He also cultivated a more restrained vibrato. In 1962 he published his book Bassoon Technique.

He also worked extensively with amateur musicians, most famously conducting the London Stock Exchange Orchestra - but also with the Manchester Orchestral Society, the Bolton Orchestral Society, the Burnley Orchestral Society and the Beethoven Society of Manchester before his move down to London.

== Concerts and recording ==
After years of extensive touring as a recitalist, chamber music player, broadcaster and lecturer, and seasons with Yehudi Menuhin and the Bath Festival Chamber Orchestra, Camden's last post as an orchestral player was with the London Mozart Players, which he joined in 1958. He stayed until 20 March 1968, when the orchestra put on an 80th birthday concert at the Royal Festival Hall, including a performance of the Mozart Bassoon Concerto.

Eric Fogg (in 1931) and Gordon Jacob (in 1947) wrote concertos for Camden, while Arnold Bax composed the Threnody and Scherzo for him in 1936. Thomas Pitfield's Trio for oboe, bassoon and piano was written for the Camden Trio (with Evelyn Rothwell, oboe and Wilfrid Parry, piano), and first broadcast by the Trio in July 1957.

Camden was also one of the first bassoonists to experiment with recording. His recordings of the Mozart Bassoon Concerto - a piece he helped rescue from relative obscurity - still remain popular today. He recorded the piece several times - most notably in March 1926 with Hamilton Harty conducting, then in 1956 with Harry Blech and the London Mozart Players. Another signature piece was his arrangement for bassoon and orchestra of the Jean-Baptiste Senaillé Allegro spirito, which he recorded in 1927.

== Personal life ==
Camden married his first wife Annie Clarice Dunington, a violinist playing with the Hallé Orchestra, in 1914. They divorced in 1934. His second wife was Helen Joyce (Jan) Kerrison, a cellist, composer, accompanist and arranger. During the war the couple moved to follow the BBC Symphony Orchestra, first to Bristol and then, once the air raids became too severe, to Bedford. In the 1950s their address in London was Flat 30, Queensborough Court, Finchley. Together they wrote the educational handbook How to Choose an Instrument: Woodwind and Brass. By 1969 - the year he was awarded an OBE - they were living at The Priory in Totteridge, London N 20. Camden died at the age of 90 in Wheathampstead, Hertfordshire.

An autobiography, Blow by Blow (with a foreword by Yehudi Menuhin) was completed just before his death, then prepared for publication posthumously by his wife Joyce.

Their two sons both went onto to become wind players, both studying at the Royal College of Music: Kerry (bassoon, 1936-2010) and Anthony Camden (oboe, 1938-2006).
