= Ludwig Milde =

Czech musician

Ludwig Milde (30 April 1849 – 12 June 1913) is known primarily as a composer of music for the bassoon. In particular, his 25 Studies in Scales and Chords (Op. 24) and his 50 Concert Studies (Op. 26) are widely played to this day.

== Biography ==
Milde was born in Prague but his life is not well documented. His first name is sometimes spelled in Czech as "Ludvík". He died, aged about 64, at Bad Nauheim, Germany.

== Published works ==
Given the date of Milde's death, his studies should now be in the public domain, but it is difficult to find a printed copy with an early enough date to verify this status. The British Library catalog lists "[1935?]" as the date of publication for the Friedrich Hofmeister editions (Leipzig) in their holdings. The Sibley Music Library at the Eastman School of Music (University of Rochester) lists "[19--?]" as the date for the Opus 24 studies ("Hofmeister Studienwerke; 7381"), but "[1964-1966]" for the Opus 26 studies. Since they are in brackets, it is to be understood that none of these dates appear on the printed scores. If there are other early copies of the studies extant, they were not found in online sources in late 2007. In the United States, of course, these considerations are irrelevant; since they were first published in 1891, they automatically fall into public domain under current United States copyright law.

The International edition commonly used in the US is of more recent origin, and includes copyright material contributed by Simon Kovar.

Besides works for the bassoon, Milde composed a Concertstück for clarinet, recently published in a version with piano by Marcel Rousseau for the Doberman editions (DO1093).
