= Bernard Garfield =

American musician (1924–2025)

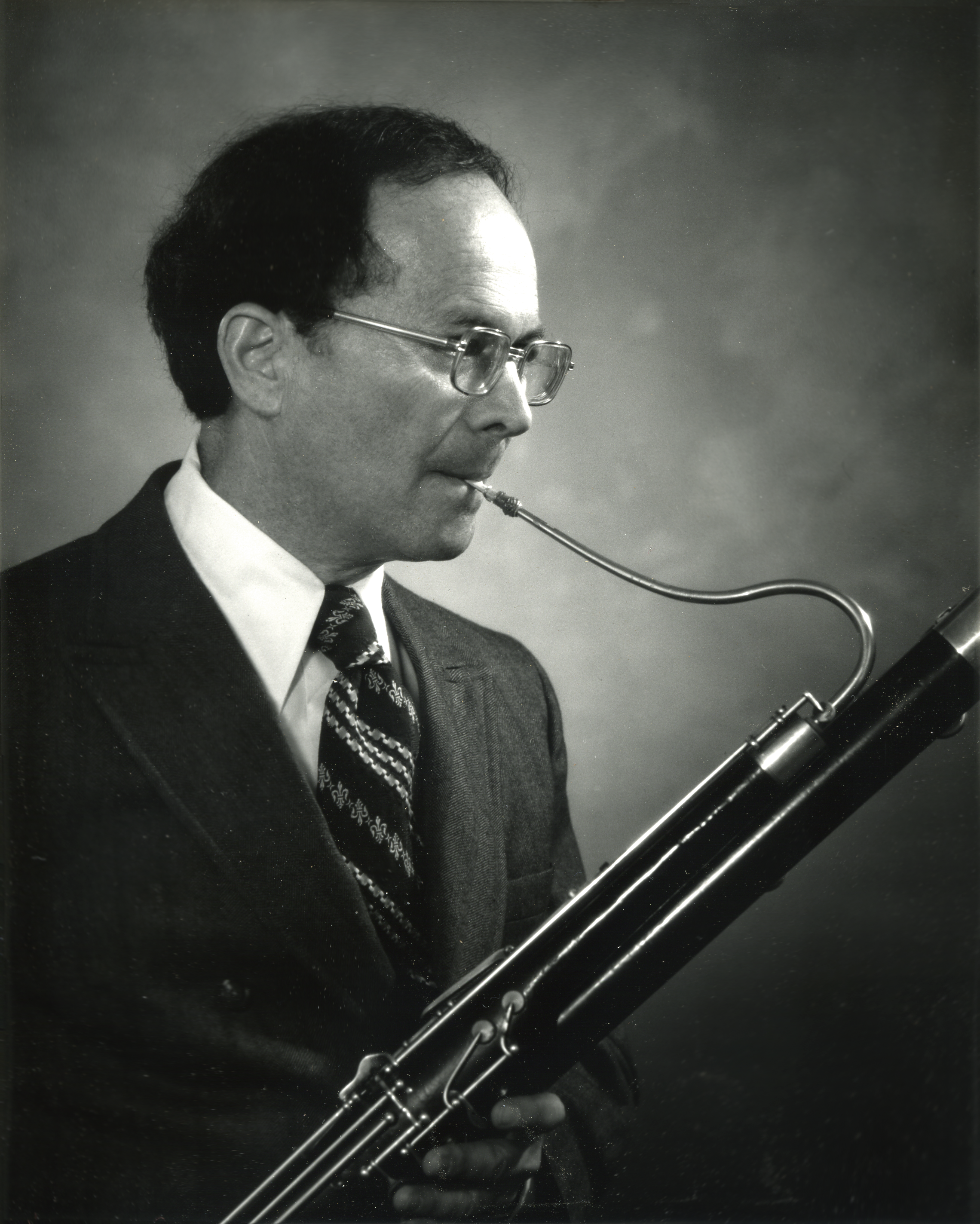
- Garfield in 1965

Background information
- Born: Bernard Howard Garfield; May 27, 1924; New York City, U.S.
- Died: April 29, 2025 (aged 100) Haddonfield, New Jersey, U.S.
- Genres: Classical, chamber
- Occupations: Classical musician; composer; professor
- Instrument: Bassoon
- Years active: 1942–2008

Bernard Howard Garfield (May 27, 1924 – April 29, 2025) was an American bassoonist, composer, teacher and recording artist. Born in Brooklyn, New York, he was best known for his long tenure as the principal bassoonist of the Philadelphia Orchestra from 1957 to 2000.

== Life and career ==
Garfield first studied the piano while growing up in Brooklyn, N.Y. Upon entering New York's High School of Music and Art, he was assigned the bassoon, and quickly took an interest in the construction of bassoon reeds. After graduation in 1942, he spent a summer at Tanglewood and studied privately in New York with Simon Kovar.

Drafted into the U.S. Army in 1943, Garfield played bassoon in the 70th Infantry Division Band during the final months of World War II, later studying at the Royal College of Music and earning degrees from NYU and Columbia. In 1946, Garfield founded the New York Woodwind Quintet, of which he was the director until 1957. From 1949 to 1957 Garfield was the principal bassoonist of The Little Orchestra Society, and principal bassoonist with the New York City Ballet Orchestra. In 1957, Garfield was selected as the new principal bassoonist of the Philadelphia Orchestra by Eugene Ormandy. Garfield's playing is featured in nearly all major recordings of the Philadelphia Orchestra under Ormandy and Riccardo Muti. In 1963, a Gramophone review of Garfield's Mozart Bassoon Concerto recording lauded his “alert sense of rhythm and a tone that manages to have a well-ground cutting edge to it without anything that could be called a buzz.” Upon his retirement, Garfield's vacant seat was won via audition by his student, Daniel Matsukawa.

Garfield was bassoon faculty of the Curtis Institute of Music from 1975 to 1980, and 1985 to 2009. He also taught at Temple University from 1957 to 2004. In addition to performing and teaching, Garfield is also known for his work as a composer. His compositions include woodwind trios, three quartets for bassoon with string trio, piano solos, songs, and duets for bassoon and piano. Upon his retirement, Garfield received an honorary doctorate from the Curtis Institute of Music. Garfield turned 100 on May 27, 2024, and died in Haddonfield, New Jersey on April 29, 2025.

== Notable students ==
- Daniel Matsukawa, principal bassoon Philadelphia Orchestra 2000-present
- John Clouser, principal bassoon Cleveland Orchestra 1997-present
- Glenn Einschlag, principal bassoon Buffalo Philharmonic 1999-present
- Martin Garcia, associate principal bassoon Cincinnati Symphony 2011-present
- Ryan Simmons, associate principal bassoon San Diego Symphony 1998-present
- Juan de Gomar, contrabassoon Atlanta Symphony Orchestra 2001-present
- Jeffrey Lyman, professor of bassoon at the University of Michigan, 2006-present
- Carl Marsh, orchestrator of Big Star's Third and former bassoon for the Memphis Symphony Orchestra

== Discography ==
Among Garfield's solo recordings with the Philadelphia Orchestra are the Mozart Sinfonia Concertante, K. 297b (1957), the Mozart Bassoon Concerto, K. 191 (1961), the Haydn Sinfonia Concertante (1958) and the Weber Andante e Rondo Ongarese, Op. 35 (1962).
