= Andrew West (pianist) =

English pianist

Andrew West (born 5 February 1979 in Tayport) is an English pianist.

Andrew West read English at Clare College, Cambridge University before going on to study piano and composition with Christopher Elton and John Streets at the Royal Academy of Music. He won second prize for piano at the Geneva International Music Competition in 1990. He now coaches on the Vocal Faculty at the Guildhall School of Music and Drama as well as teaching piano accompaniment at the Royal Academy of Music. He is also one of the artistic directors of the Nuremberg International Chamber Music Festival.

He has recorded the complete works of Les Six for flute and piano with Emily Beynon (flute), and has accompanied soprano Emma Bell in a recording of songs by Strauss, Walter and Marx. He collaborated with the Lyric Quartet to record a CD of chamber music by Herbert Howells.

For the 2004 Aldeburgh Festival, Richard Baker, in collaboration with poet Lavinia Greenlaw, composed a cycle of songs for West and baritone Christopher Purves. In 2006, he accompanied baritone Håkan Vramsmo at the Luton Music Festival, playing songs by Richard Strauss, Hugo Alfvén, Sibelius, Britten and Schumann.
