= John Orford =

British musician

John Orford is a British classical bassoonist. He studied under Charles Cracknell and William Waterhouse at the Royal Manchester College of Music. After graduation, he became a member of the Bournemouth Sinfonietta, and later the BBC Symphony Orchestra. In 1982, he was appointed Principal Bassoon of the London Sinfonietta. In 1984, he joined the faculty at the Royal Academy of Music and the Guildhall School of Music and Drama as professor of bassoon. In 1999, he commissioned Geoffrey Grey to write the piece Preamble and 5 Variations for bassoon and piano. He has appeared with all the major British orchestras, including the London Symphony Orchestra, London Philharmonic, Royal Philharmonic, and the Philharmonia.
