= Laurence Perkins =

British classical bassoonist

Laurence Perkins (born 1954) is a British classical bassoonist. He studied under Charles Cracknell at the Royal Northern College of Music in Manchester. Perkins was principal bassoonist of the Manchester Camerata from 1974 to 2017. He has performed internationally in countries including France, Norway, Hong Kong, and Australia.
