= Hugo Fox =

American musician

Hugo Fox (February 2, 1897 in South Whitley, Indiana – December 29, 1969 in South Whitley, Indiana) was an American classical bassoonist. He also designed and manufactured bassoons and oboes.

Fox studied the bassoon with Adolph Weiss, a member of the Chicago Symphony Orchestra. In 1921, he studied with Walter Guetter, the principal bassoonist of the CSO. The following year, he took over Guetter's post, at his recommendation, and remained in that capacity from 1922 to 1949. He also taught at Northwestern University from 1936 to 1950. In 1949, Fox founded the Fox Products Corporation, which currently produces bassoons and oboes in South Whitley. The company is a supplier of double reed instruments. His son, Alan Fox, was a founding member of the International Double Reed Society and took over Fox Products in 1960.

In 1979, the International Double Reed Society created the annual Fernand Gillet-Hugo Fox International Competition for oboists and bassoonists in honor of the oboist Fernand Gillet and Hugo Fox.
