= Martin Gatt =

British classical bassoonist

Martin Gatt (born 1937 in Aberdeen) is a British classical bassoonist. He studied under Archie Camden at the Royal College of Music in London. He served as principal bassoonist of the London Philharmonic Orchestra from 1958 to 1966, after which he was appointed principal bassoonist of the English Chamber Orchestra from 1966 to 1976. He also held the post of principal bassoon of the London Symphony Orchestra from 1977 to 1998, and was the bassoonist in the Barry Tuckwell Wind Quintet from 1967 to 1991. He is also active in music education. At the Hong Kong Academy for Performing Arts he founded the Department of Wind, Brass and Percussion. He taught at the Guildhall School of Music & Drama from 1967 to 1984, and is currently a professor of Bassoon at the Royal College of Music.
