= List of Juilliard School people =

This list of Juilliard School people contains links to Wikipedia articles about notable alumni and teachers of the Juilliard School in New York City.

== Notable alumni ==
=== Dance division ===
The dance division was established in 1951. It offers a four-year Bachelor of Fine Arts (BFA) degree or a diploma. In prior years it also awarded B.S. and M.S. degrees.

- Robert Battle (BFA 1994) – choreographer
- Phoebe Cates – actress, singer, entrepreneur
- Brennan Clost (2016) – dancer, actor
- Carla DeSola (1960) – pioneer of liturgical dance
- Robert Garland (BFA 1983) – choreographer
- Marcia Jean Kurtz (BS 1964) – actress, director
- Daniel Lewis (1967) dancer, choreographer, teacher
- Lar Lubovitch (1964) – choreographer
- Robert LuPone – actor
- Bradon McDonald (1997, dance) – dancer, choreographer, fashion designer
- Ohad Naharin (1977) – dancer, choreographer
- Bebe Neuwirth (1977, dance) – actress, singer, dancer
- Henning Rübsam (BFA 1991, dance) – choreographer
- Rina Schenfeld – choreographer, dancer
- Adam Shankman – dancer, director
- Elizabeth Sung (BFA, dance) – actress
- Paul Taylor (BS 1953, dance) – choreographer
- Lea Ved (BFA 2013, dance) – choreographer and contemporary dancer

Director of Dance

- Martha Hill (1952–1985)
- Muriel Topaz (1985–1991)
- Benjamin Harkarvy (1992–2002)
- Lawrence Rhodes (2002–2017)
- Alicia Graf Mack (2018–2024)

=== Drama division ===
The drama division was founded in 1968. Those who complete the four-year program receive either a Bachelor of Fine Arts (BFA) degree, a Master of Fine Arts (MFA) degree (starting from Fall 2012), or a diploma. Each year's class is identified by a group number: Group 1 started in 1968 and graduated in 1972; Group 54 includes students completing their fourth year in 2025.

All Juilliard Drama groups from 1 to 50 and alumni of the Playwrights and Directors programs were catalogued for its anniversary in 2017 here. Notable students are reflected below with their group number and graduation year (or years of attendance if they did not graduate).

- Jane Adams (Group 18, 1989)
- David Alford (Group 20, 1991)
- Frankie J. Alvarez (Group 39, 2010)
- Mitchell Anderson (Group 16, 1987)
- Robert Aramayo (Group 44, 2015)
- Michael Arden (Group 34, 2001–2003)
- Tony Azito (Group 1, 1968–1970)
- Morena Baccarin (Group 29, 2000)
- Nathan Baesel (Group 31, 2002)
- David Aaron Baker (Group 19, 1990)
- Lisa Banes (Group 8, 1979)
- Christine Baranski (Group 3, 1974)
- Charlie Barnett (Group 39, 2010)
- Michael Beach (Group 15, 1986)
- Nicole Beharie (Group 36, 2007)
- Wes Bentley (Group 29, 1996–1997)
- Casey Biggs (Group 6, 1977)
- Ryan Bittle (Group 31, 2002)
- Mark Blankfield (Group 3, 1974)
- Tom Blyth (Group 49, 2020)
- Charles Borland (Group 30, 2001)
- Steven Boyer (Group 30, 2001)
- Brittany Bradford (Group 47, 2018)
- Andre Braugher (Group 17, 1988)
- Daniel Breaker (Group 31, 2002)
- Danielle Brooks (Group 40, 2011)
- L. Peter Callender (Group 8, 1979)
- Christian Camargo (Group 25, 1996)
- Bill Camp (Group 18, 1989)
- Graham Campbell (Group 53, 2024)
- Jeffrey Carlson (Group 30, 2001)
- Jennifer Carpenter (Group 31, 2002)
- Alexander Chaplin (Group 22, 1993)
- Rondi Charleston (Group 9, left)
- Jessica Chastain (Group 32, 2003)
- Amari Cheatom (Group 37, 2008)
- Fala Chen (Group 47, 2018)
- Michael Chernus (Group 28, 1999)
- Nicholas Christopher (Group 42, 2009–2010)
- Mary Chieffo (Group 44, 2015)
- Dimitri Coats (Group 24, 1991–1993)
- Bryan Cogman (Group 30, 2001)
- Grantham Coleman (Group 41, 2012)
- Jessie Collins (Group 34, 2005)
- Lynn Collins (Group 28, 1999)
- David Conrad (Group 25, 1992–1995)
- Frances Conroy (Group 6, 1977)
- Kevin Conroy (Group 6, 1977)
- David Corenswet (Group 45, 2016)
- Donald Corren (Group 4, 1975)
- Marcia Cross (Group 13, 1984)
- Wallis Currie-Wood (Group 43, 2014)
- Sheila Dabney (Group 8, 1979)
- Kevin Daniels (Group 27, 1998)
- Keith David (Group 8, 1979)
- Viola Davis (Group 22, 1993)
- John de Lancie (Group 5, 1976)
- David Denman (Group 26, 1997)
- Reed Diamond (Group 20, 1991)
- Megan Dodds (Group 24, 1995)
- Harris Doran (Group 29, 1996–1998)
- Mike Doyle (Group 27, 1998)
- Adam Driver (Group 38, 2009)
- Christine Dunford (Group 16, 1987)
- Peter Dvorsky (Group 2, 1973)
- Gabriel Ebert (Group 38, 2009)
- James Eckhouse (Group 9, 1980)
- Edward Edwards (Group 4, 1975)
- Gretchen Egolf (Group 24, 1995)
- Nelsan Ellis (Group 33, 2004)
- Jack Fletcher (Group 5, 1976)
- Anne Kerry Ford (Group 8, 1979)
- Richard Frank (Group 7, 1978)
- Lucy Freyer (Group 49, 2020)
- Betty Gabriel (Group 43, 2014)
- Boyd Gaines (Group 8, 1979)
- Megan Gallagher (Group 11, 1982)
- Dawn-Lyen Gardner (Group 32, 2003)
- Michael Genet (Group 9, 1980)
- Thomas Gibson (Group 14, 1985)
- Michel Gill (Group 14, 1985)
- James Francis Ginty (Group 32, 1999–2001)
- Heather Goldenhersh (Group 24, 1995)
- Enid Graham (Group 21, 1992); 1998 Tony nominee
- Kelsey Grammer (Group 6, 1973–1975)
- Shalita Grant (Group 39, 2010)
- Lynnie Greene (Group 5, 1972–1975)
- John Gremillion (Group 19, 1986–1988)
- Kristin Griffith (Group 4, 1975)
- Damon Gupton (Group 28, 1999)
- Gerald Gutierrez (Group 1, 1972)
- Brandon Micheal Hall (Group 44, 2015)
- LisaGay Hamilton (Group 18, 1989)
- Evan Handler (Group 12, 1979–1981)
- Brian Hargrove (Group 10, 1981)
- James Harper (Group 3, 1974)
- Harriet Sansom Harris (Group 6, 1977)
- Jeremie Harris (Group 41, 2012)
- Frank Harts (Group 31, 2002)
- Maya Hawke (Group 49, 2016–2017)
- Corey Hawkins (Group 40, 2011)
- Michael Hayden (Group 21, 1992)
- Stephen McKinley Henderson (Group 1, 1968–1970)
- Benjamin Hendrickson (Group 1, 1972)
- Patrick Heusinger (Group 33, 2004)
- John Benjamin Hickey (Group 18, 1989)
- Nancy Hower (Group 21, 1992)
- Glenn Howerton (Group 29, 2000)
- Janet Hubert (Group 7; left)
- David Hunt (Group 15, 1986)
- William Hurt (Group 5, 1976)
- Doug Hutchison (Group 17, left)
- Jennifer Ikeda (Group 30, 2001)
- Oscar Isaac (Group 34, 2005)
- Gillian Jacobs (Group 33, 2004)
- Peter Jacobson (Group 20, 1991)
- Gregory Jbara (Group 15, 1986)
- Kate Jennings Grant (Group 25, 1996)
- Mallori Johnson (Group 50, 2021)
- Penny Johnson Jerald (Group 11, 1982)
- Matt Keeslar (Group 24, 1995)
- Daniel Kennedy (Group 36, 2007)
- Jack Kenny (Group 11, 1982)
- Val Kilmer (Group 10, 1981)
- Perry King (Group 3, 1970–1971)
- Stephen James King (Group 37, 2008)
- Kevin Kline (Group 1, 1970–1972)
- Joaquina Kalukango (Group 40, 2011)
- Linda Kozlowski (Group 10, 1981)
- Erin Krakow (Group 35, 2005)
- David Kriegel (Group 19, 1990)
- Thor Kristjánsson (Group 40, 2011)
- Stephen Kunken (Group 26, 1997)
- Eriq La Salle (Group 13, 1980–1982)
- Jayme Lawson (Group 48, 2019)
- Laura-Leigh (Group 37, 2008)
- Richard Levine (Group 6, 1977)
- Steve Levitt (Group 8, 1979)
- James Hiroyuki Liao (Group 33, 2004)
- Laura Linney (Group 19, 1990)
- Bellina Logan (Group 17, 1988)
- Michael Louden (Group 17, 1988)
- Vella Lovell (Group 44, 2015)
- Jessica Love (Group 38, 2009)
- Geoffrey Lower (Group 16, 1987)
- Justine Lupe (Group 40, 2011)
- Patti LuPone (Group 1, 1972)
- Luke Macfarlane (Group 32, 2003)
- Anthony Mackie (Group 30, 2001)
- Nate Mann (Group 48, 2019)
- Kenneth Marshall (Group 6, 1977)
- James Marsters (Group 15, 1982–1984)
- James Martinez (Group 31, 2002)
- Elizabeth Marvel (Group 21, 1992)
- Patricia Mauceri (Group 2, 1973)
- Leigh McCloskey (Group 6, 1973–1975)
- Kelly McGillis (Group 12, 1983)
- Elizabeth McGovern (Group 12, 1979–1981)
- Robert Duncan McNeill (Group 17, 1984–1986)
- John McTiernan (Group 3, left)
- Ismenia Mendes (Group 41, 2012)
- Nick Mennell (Group 34, 2005)
- Lindsay Merrithew (Group 15, 1982–1984)
- Jim Moody (Group 1, 1972)
- Gregory Mosher (Group 4, 1971–1974)
- Aaron Moten (Group 40, 2011)
- Melinda Mullins (Group 15, 1986)
- Kurt Naebig (Group 19, 1990)
- Tim Blake Nelson (Group 19, 1990)
- Seth Numrich (Group 36, 2007)
- Clancy O'Connor (Group 35, 2005)
- Michael O'Hare (Group 7, 1978)
- Caitlin O'Heaney (Group 3, 1974)
- Nancy Opel (Group 9, 1980)
- Lee Pace (Group 30, 2001)
- Teyonah Parris (Group 38, 2009)
- Lux Pascal (Group 52, 2023)
- Mandy Patinkin (Group 5, 1972–1974)
- Erica Peeples (Group 36, 2007)
- Lisa Pelikan (Group 5, 1976)
- Lee Percy (Group 4, 1975)
- Paul Perri (Group 6, 1977)
- Wendell Pierce (Group 14, 1985)
- Nicholas Podany (Group 47, 2018)
- Carrie Preston (Group 23, 1994)
- Lonny Price (Group 10, 1977–1978)
- Tricia Pursley (Group 7, 1978)
- Saundra Quarterman (Group 19, 1990)
- Sara Ramirez (Group 26, 1997)
- Wes Ramsey (Group 29, 2000)
- Gayle Rankin (Group 40, 2011)
- Ben Rappaport (Group 37, 2008)
- Monica Raymund (Group 37, 2008)
- Elizabeth Reaser (Group 28, 1999)
- Serena Reeder (Group 34, 2005)
- Christopher Reeve (Group 4, 1973–1975)
- Marianne Rendón (Group 45, 2016)
- Ving Rhames (Group 12, 1983)
- Kate Rigg (Group 26, 1997)
- Tom Robbins (Group 6, 1977)
- Dallas Roberts (Group 23, 1994)
- Hadley Robinson (Group 47, 2018)
- Matt Ross (Group 22, 1993)
- Jed Rubenfeld (Group 13, 1980–1982)
- Kario Salem (Group 7, left)
- Marla Schaffel (Group 19, 1990)
- Stephen Schnetzer (Group 3, 1974)
- David Schramm (Group 1, 1972)
- Franklyn Seales (Group 3, 1974)
- Matt Servitto (Group 18, 1989)
- Kevin Sessums (Group 8, left)
- Alex Sharp (Group 43, 2014)
- Michael James Shaw (Group 42, 2013)
- Tari Signor (Group 22, 1993)
- Leslie Silva (Group 24, 1995)
- Neva Small (Group 5, left)
- Shayna Small (Group 39, 2010)
- Brian J. Smith (Group 36, 2007)
- Carolyn Michelle Smith (Group 41, 2012)
- Norman Snow (Group 1, 1972)
- Phillipa Soo (Group 41, 2012)
- Samantha Soule (Group 31, 2002)
- Kevin Spacey (Group 12, 1979–1981)
- Ryan Spahn (Group 43, 2014)
- Bern Nadette Stanis (Group 5, 1972–1974)
- Jack Stehlin (Group 11, 1982)
- Mary Stein (Group 13, 1984)
- David Ogden Stiers (Group 1, 1972)
- Henry Stram (Group 6, 1977)
- Ethan Strimling (Group 18, 1985–1987)
- Michael Stuhlbarg (Group 21, 1992)
- Joy Suprano (Group 37, 2008)
- Jeremy Tardy (Group 42, 2013)
- Maureen Teefy (Group 8, 1979)
- Jon Tenney (Group 17, 1984–1985)
- Desean Terry (Group 33, 2004)
- Maria Thayer (Group 27, 1998)
- Tracie Thoms (Group 30, 2001)
- Frankie Thorn (Group 18, 1989)
- Auden Thornton (Group 40, 2011)
- Evan Todd (Group 40, 2011)
- Tom Todoroff (Group 11, 1982)
- Lorraine Toussaint (Group 11, 1982)
- Jeanne Tripplehorn (Group 19, 1990)
- Sam Tsoutsouvas (Group 1, 1972)
- Alan Tudyk (Group 26, 1993–1996)
- Stephen Barker Turner (Group 23, 1994)
- Michael Urie (Group 32, 2003)
- Paul Michael Valley (Group 20, 1987–1990)
- James Vasquez (Group 23, 1994)
- Diane Venora (Group 6, 1977)
- Zach Villa (Group 38, 2009)
- Steve Vinovich (Group 3, 1974)
- Sophie von Kessel (Group 23, 1994)
- Thomas G. Waites (Group 7, 1974–1977)
- Benjamin Walker (Group 33, 2004)
- Jake Weber (Group 19, 1990)
- Jess Weixler (Group 32, 2003)
- Fred Weller (Group 21, 1988–1991)
- Rutina Wesley (Group 34, 2005)
- Bradley Whitford (Group 14, 1985)
- Samira Wiley (Group 39, 2010)
- Robin Williams (Group 6, 1973–1976)
- Michael Wincott (Group 15, 1986)
- C. J. Wilson (Group 23, 1994)
- Mary Wiseman (Group 44, 2015)
- Finn Wittrock (Group 37, 2008)
- Sam Witwer (Group 29, 1996–1998)
- Luke Yankee (Group 13, 1978–1980)
- Janet Zarish (Group 5, 1976)
- Rosanny Zayas (Group 46, 2017)
- Stephanie Zimbalist (Group 7, 1974–1975)

==== Playwrights program ====
The Lila Acheson Wallace American Playwrights Program is a one-year graduate level program in Juilliard's drama division. Selected playwrights invited to complete a second year may earn an Artist Diploma in Playwriting.

The program began as a residency rather than a course of study until it took its current form in 1993. It was directed by John Guare and Terrence McNally for the first year, followed by Marsha Norman and Christopher Durang until Durang's retirement in 2016. He was succeeded by David Lindsay-Abaire, and Tanya Barfield succeeded Norman in 2020.

- David Adjmi (Playwrights 2002)
- Sofia Alvarez (Playwrights 2011)
- David Auburn (Playwrights 1995, 1996)
- Tanya Barfield (Playwrights 2001, 2002)
- Stephen Belber (Playwrights 1995, 1996)
- Hilary Bell
- Brooke Berman (Playwrights 1998, 1999)
- Hilary Bettis (Playwrights 2015)
- Eboni Booth (Playwrights 2019, 2020)
- Jonathan Caren
- Julia Cho (Playwrights 2002, 2003)
- Fernanda Coppel
- Cusi Cram (Playwrights 2000)
- Alexandra Cunningham (Playwrights 2000)
- Bathsheba Doran (Playwrights 2005)
- Ron Fitzgerald (Playwrights 1998)
- Etan Frankel (Playwrights 2002)
- Jessica Goldberg (Playwrights 1998, 1999, 2000)
- Katori Hall (Playwrights 2008, 2009)
- Josh Harmon (Playwrights 2012, 2013, 2014)
- Samuel D. Hunter (Playwrights 2009)
- Nathan Louis Jackson (Playwrights 2009)
- Branden Jacobs-Jenkins (Playwrights 2012, 2013)
- Nick Jones (Playwrights 2011)
- Julia Jordan (Playwrights 1995)
- Abe Koogler (Playwrights 2016)
- Deborah Zoe Laufer (Playwrights 2000)
- Michael Lew (Playwrights 2013)
- David Lindsay-Abaire (Playwrights 1997, 1998)
- Donja R. Love (Playwrights 2019)
- Martyna Majok (Playwrights 2015, 2016, 2017)
- Chelsea Marcantel (Playwrights 2016)
- Lynn Martin
- Carly Mensch (Playwrights 2008)
- Elizabeth Meriwether (Playwrights 2007, 2008)
- Janine Nabers (Playwrights 2012, 2013)
- Kira Obolensky
- Marco Ramirez (Playwrights 2009)
- Adam Rapp (Playwrights 1999, 2000)
- David West Read
- Dan Moses Schreier (Playwrights 2008)
- Jen Silverman (Playwrights 2015)
- Tommy Smith
- Aurin Squire (Playwrights 2015)
- Brian Tucker
- Beau Willimon (Playwrights 2008)

==== Directors program ====
The Andrew W. Mellon Artist Diploma Program for Theatre Directors was a two-year graduate fellowship that began in 1995 (expanded to three years in 1997) and was discontinued from autumn 2006.

- Sam Gold (Directors 2006)

=== Music division ===
The music division offers a four-year Bachelor of Music (BM) degree, a Master of Music (MM) degree, a Doctor of Musical Arts (DMA) degree, an Artist Diploma (AD), or a diploma. In earlier years it also awarded B.S. and M.S. degrees.

- Edie Adams – singer, actress
- Bruce Adolphe – composer, author
- Sophia Agranovich (pre-college 1973, BM 1978, MM 1979) – pianist
- Hanan Alattar – soprano
- Charlie Albright – pianist, composer
- John Aler – lyric tenor
- Susan Alexander-Max (BS 1965, MS 1966, piano) – fortepianist
- Greg Anderson (BM 2004, MM 2006, piano) – pianist, composer
- Helen Armstrong – violinist
- Şahan Arzruni (diploma 1965, BS 1967, MS 1968, piano) – pianist
- Lera Auerbach (BM 1996, piano; MM 1999, composition) – pianist, composer
- Nathaniel Ayers (1972, double bass) – bassist
- Christian Badea – conductor
- Chase Baird – saxophonist
- Jordan Bak – violist
- Jenny Oaks Baker – violinist
- Huáscar Barradas – flautist
- Jon Batiste – pianist
- Enrique Batiz – pianist
- Jon "Bowzer" Bauman – Sha Na Na bass vocalist, classical pianist
- Larry Thomas Bell – composer
- Bob Berg – saxophonist
- Harold Blair – tenor
- Serge Blanc – violinist, conductor, academic
- Mike Block (MM 2006) – cellist, singer, composer
- Theodore Bloomfield – conductor
- Aida Bonnelly de Diaz, pianist, writer and artistic director
- Bugs Bower – songwriter, record producer
- Ronald Braunstein – conductor
- Yefim Bronfman – pianist
- Anne Wiggins Brown – soprano
- Elizabeth Brown (MM 1977) – composer and performer
- The 5 Browns: Deondra, Desirae, Gregory, Melody, Ryan – pianists
- Sheila Browne – violist
- Leo Brouwer – guitarist, composer
- Bruce Brubaker – pianist, composer
- David Bryan – keyboardist of Bon Jovi
- Steven Bryant – composer
- Kenji Bunch (BM 1995, MM 1997, viola; MM 1997, composition) – violist, composer
- Sara Davis Buechner (BM 1980, MM 1981, piano) – pianist, recording artist
- Igor Buketoff – conductor
- Cosmo Buono – pianist, founder of The Alexander and Buono Competitions
- Kevin Burdette – bass
- George Byrd – conductor
- Michel Camilo – jazz pianist
- John-Michael Caprio – conductor, organist
- Barry Carl – a cappella bass singer, bassist, voice-over artist
- Jonathan Carney – violinist, violist, conductor
- Cameron Carpenter (BM 2004, MM 2006, organ) – organist, composer
- Bryan Carter – drummer, vocalist, composer
- Jesse Ceci – violinist
- John Cerminaro – hornist
- David Chan (MM 1997, violin) – violinist
- Sarah Chang – violinist
- Jiafeng Chen – violinist
- Robert Chen – violinist
- Dan Chmielinski – jazz bassist
- Jennifer Choi – composer, violinist, member of Ethel string quartet
- Timothy Chooi – violinist
- Kyung-wha Chung – violinist
- Myung-whun Chung – conductor, pianist
- Van Cliburn – pianist
- Pamela Coburn – soprano
- Dan Coleman – composer
- James Conlon – conductor
- Bill Conti – composer
- Chick Corea (1961, piano) – jazz pianist
- Robert Craft – conductor, music writer
- John Creswell – jazz musician
- Nan Ogburn Cullman – singer
- Vera Curtis – soprano
- Miles Davis – jazz trumpeter (three semester)
- Netania Davrath – soprano
- Rani Vijaya Devi – pianist
- Annamary Dickey – soprano
- Glenn Dicterow – violinist
- Alfredo Diez Nieto – Cuban composer, conductor and professor
- Orlando DiGirolamo – jazz accordionist, composer
- David Dubal – pianist, teacher, author, broadcaster, painter (1961)
- Alexandra du Bois – composer
- Lawrence Dutton (BM 1977, MM 1978, viola) – violist
- James Ehnes – violinist
- Judith Kaplan Eisenstein – author, musicologist, composer, theologian.
- Warren Ellsworth (1950–1993), operatic tenor
- Ruby Elzy – soprano
- Michael Endres – pianist
- Damien Escobar – Violinist
- Faith Esham – soprano
- Jonathan Estabrooks – baritone
- Eric Ewazen – composer
- JoAnn Falletta – conductor, guitarist
- Ying Fang – soprano
- Ralph Farris – composer, conductor, violist, violinist, co-founder of Ethel string quartet
- Alan Feinberg – pianist
- Wilhelmenia Fernandez (BM Voice) – soprano, actress
- Arthur Ferrante – pianist
- Brian T. Field – composer
- Renée Fleming – soprano
- Mario Frangoulis – tenor
- Gerald Fried – composer
- David Friedkin – writer, director, producer
- Kenneth Fuchs – composer (MM, 1983; DMA, 1988; 2018 GRAMMY Award, Best Classical Compendium)
- Kevin R. Gallagher – guitarist
- David Garrett – violinist
- Eliza Garth – pianist
- David Garvey – pianist
- Tim Genis – timpanist
- Ariana Ghez – oboist
- Lawrence Gilliard Jr. – actor
- Ola Gjeilo – composer, pianist, arranger
- Michael Giacchino – composer
- Alan Gilbert – conductor
- Herschel Burke Gilbert – composer
- Wallis Giunta – mezzo-soprano
- Philip Glass – composer
- David Golub – pianist
- Eddie Gómez – jazz bassist
- Matt Good – tubist
- Midori Goto – violinist
- Jason Grant – singer
- Alan Greenspan – clarinetist, former chair of the Federal Reserve Board
- Henry Grimes – double bassist
- Paul Groves – tenor
- Yang Guang – mezzo-soprano
- Horacio Gutiérrez – pianist
- Bruce Haack – pioneer in electronic music
- Andreas Haefliger – pianist
- Daron Hagen – composer, pianist, conductor, stage director
- B. H. Haggin – music critic
- Cecelia Hall – mezzo-soprano
- Tamar Halperin – pianist, harpsichordist, and musicologist
- Anna Handler – pianist, conductor
- Marvin Hamlisch – composer, pianist
- Amanda Harberg – composer
- Lynn Harrell – cellist
- Edward W. Hardy – violinist, violist, composer
- Margaret Rosezarian Harris – conductor, composer
- Miguel Harth-Bedoya – conductor
- Eugene Haynes – pianist, composer
- Julius Hegyi – violinist, conductor
- Luther Henderson – arranger, composer, orchestrator
- Freddie Herko – musician, dancer
- Bernard Herrmann – composer
- Natalie Hinderas – pianist, composer
- Yoshihisa Hirano – composer
- Moses Hogan – composer, conductor, arranger of choral music and spirituals
- Stephen Hough – pianist
- Ching-Yun Hu (pre-college 1999, BM 2003, MM 2005) – pianist
- Helen Huang – pianist
- Frank Huang – violinist
- Hao Huang – pianist
- Monica Huggett – baroque violinist
- Nobuko Imai – violist
- Mattias Jacobsson – guitarist
- Morgan James – singer, actress
- Joseph Kalichstein – pianist
- Sharon Kam – clarinetist
- Michael Kamen – composer, oboist
- Paul Kantor – violinist
- Jozef Kapustka – pianist
- Laura Karpman – composer
- David Katz – composer
- Louis Kaufman – violinist
- Martin Kennedy – composer, pianist
- Matthew Kennedy – pianist
- Nigel Kennedy – violinist
- Nina Kennedy – pianist
- Jeffrey Khaner – flutist
- Edith Killgore Kirkpatrick – music educator
- Benny Kim – violinist
- Bomsori Kim (MM 2016, AD 2018, violin) – violinist
- Chin Kim – violinist
- David Kim – violinist
- Coya Knutson – Minnesota U.S. representative
- Wladimir Jan Kochanski – pianist
- Catherine Ransom Karoly – flutist
- Rosemary Kuhlmann – mezzo-soprano
- Fredell Lack – violinist
- Dane Lam – conductor
- Kenneth Lampl – composer
- Kay Lande – composer and singer
- Manny Laureano – trumpet
- Paul Lavalle – conductor, arranger, radio show personality
- Dorothy Lawson – cellist, composer, co-founder of Ethel (string quartet)
- Trey Chui-yee Lee – cellist
- Adele Leigh – English operatic soprano
- Isabel Leonard – mezzo-soprano
- Pete Levin – keyboards, horn
- Gilbert Levine – conductor
- James Levine (diploma 1963, orchestral conducting) – conductor
- Cho-Liang Lin – violinist
- Lowell Liebermann – composer, conductor, pianist
- Jens Lindemann – trumpet
- Mats Lidström – solo cellist, chamber musician, composer, teacher, publisher
- Robert Lipsett – violinist
- Andrew Litton – pianist, conductor
- Ricardo Llorca – composer
- Nicola Loud – violinist
- Kevin Kwan Loucks – pianist, arts entrepreneur
- Josephine Harreld Love– piano, musicologist, educator
- David Ludwig – composer, Juilliard dean of music
- Leviticus Lyon – tenor vocalist
- Yo-Yo Ma (Professional Studies 1972, cello) – cellist
- Teo Macero – jazz composer, producer
- Tod Machover – composer
- John Mackey (MM 1997, composition) – composer
- Henry Mancini – composer, conductor
- Jon Manasse – clarinetist
- Eugenia Manolidou – composer, conductor
- Catherine Manoukian – violinist
- Barry Manilow – singer & songwriter
- Edvin Marton – violinist
- Wynton Marsalis – trumpeter
- Ana María Martínez – opera singer
- Gulnara Mashurova – harpist
- Joyce Mathis – soprano
- Audra McDonald (BM 1993, voice) – singer and actress
- Christian McBride – jazz bassist
- Susann McDonald – harpist
- Robert McDuffie – violinist
- Steven Mercurio – composer, conductor
- Anne Akiko Meyers – violinist
- Stefan Milenković – violinist
- Jeffery Miller – trombonist
- Meagan Miller – opera singer
- Stephanie Mills – singer
- Eric Milnes – harpsichordist, organist and conductor
- Leon Milo – composer, percussionist and sound artist
- Shlomo Mintz – violinist and conductor
- Alexander Mishnaevski – violinist
- Beata Moon – composer, pianist
- Charlotte Moorman – cellist
- Alan Morrison – organist
- Mark Morton – bassist
- Nico Muhly – composer, pianist
- Simon Nabatov – pianist, composer
- Hiroko Nakamura – pianist
- Moshe Nathanson – composer, cantor, and musicologist
- Christina Naughton – pianist
- Michelle Naughton – pianist
- Paul Neebe – trumpeter
- Pascal Nemirovski – pianist
- Jessica Niles – soprano
- Takako Nishizaki – violinist
- Linda November – singer
- Julia Nussenbaum – violinist, also known as Tania Lubova
- Constantine Orbelian – conductor, pianist
- Noriko Ogawa – pianist
- Santos Ojeda – pianist
- America Olivo – mezzo-soprano, actor
- Jakub Józef Orliński – countertenor
- Margaret Saunders Ott – pianist
- Peter Oundjian – violinist, conductor
- Alex Panamá – composer
- Dorothy Papadakos – MM, organ
- Anthony & Joseph Paratore – piano duo
- Margaret Pardee – violinist
- Rene Paulo – pianist
- Nick Perito – composer, arranger, music director, performer
- Itzhak Perlman – violinist
- Marina Piccinini – flutist
- Miguel Franz Pinto – vocal coach, conductor, pianist
- Hila Plitmann – opera singer, soprano
- Itzhak Perlman – violinist
- Susanna Phillips – opera singer, soprano
- Christina Petrowska-Quilico – pianist
- Ashan Pillai – violist
- Daniel Pollack – pianist
- Leontyne Price – soprano
- Tito Puente – Latin jazz and mambo musician
- Michael Rabin – violinist
- Valentin Radu – pianist/organist, conductor
- André Raphel – conductor
- Behzad Ranjbaran – composer
- Einojuhani Rautavaara – composer
- Vivian Reed (B.M. Voice, 1968) – actress, singer, and dancer
- Steve Reich – composer
- Carole Dawn Reinhart – trumpet, professor in Vienna
- Madelyn Renee – soprano
- Gerardo Ribeiro – violinist
- Fernando Rivas – composer
- Graciela Rivera – soprano
- Jennifer Rivera – mezzo-soprano
- Marco Rizo – composer, pianist
- Richard Rodgers– composer, pianist
- Julius Rodriguez – pianist, drummer
- Neil Rosenshein – tenor
- Mary Rowell – composer, violinist, co-founder of Ethel (string quartet)
- Alan Rubin – trumpeter
- John Rubinstein – composer, actor
- Jordan Rudess – pianist, Dream Theater
- Joel Ryce-Menuhin – pianist, psychologist
- Rohan Joseph de Saram – conductor
- Ezra Schabas – clarinet, saxophone, educator
- Staffan Scheja – pianist
- Peter Schickele – composer, satirist
- William Schimmel – composer, accordionist
- Charles Schlueter – trumpeter
- Stephen Schwartz (pre-college 1964, piano)
- Gerard Schwarz – conductor
- Hazel Scott – pianist, singer
- Judson Scott – actor, pianist
- Raymond Scott – composer, bandleader, inventor
- Tony Scott – Bebop clarinetist, arranger, New World music innovator
- Alex Seaver – singer-songwriter and DJ known as Mako
- Kathryn Selby – pianist
- Dov Seltzer – composer and conductor
- Gil Shaham – violinist
- Michael Jeffrey Shapiro – composer, conductor, and author.
- Theodore Shapiro (MFA 1995, music composition)
- Mordecai Shehori – pianist
- Natalie Ni Shi – operatic soprano
- Ory Shihor – pianist
- Alan Shulman – composer, cellist
- Tracy Silverman – violinist, composer
- Jacques Singer – conductor
- Lori Singer – cellist, actress
- Nina Simone – musician, civil rights activist
- Leonard Slatkin – conductor
- Brian Slawson – composer
- Vilem Sokol – violinist
- Lew Soloff – composer, trumpeter
- Wim Statius Muller – composer, pianist
- Mark Steinberg – violinist
- Albert Stern – violinist
- Paul Stetsenko – organist
- Bob Stillman (BM Piano)
- Liz Story – pianist
- William Bradley Strickland – composer, music publisher, and music educator
- Hai-Kyung Suh – pianist
- Kathleen Supové – pianist
- Akiko Suwanai – violinist
- Jeffrey Swann – pianist
- Walter Taieb – composer, conductor
- Yoav Talmi – composer and conductor
- Margaret Leng Tan – pianist
- Louis Teicher – pianist
- Alfred Teltschik – pianist
- Ralph de Toledano – journalist, music critic
- Marioara Trifan – pianist, conductor
- Ahn Trio – chamber music trio
- Francesco Tristano – pianist
- Jonathan Tunick – orchestrator
- Rosalyn Tureck – pianist, harpsichordist
- Hideko Udagawa – violinist
- Leslie Uggams – actress, singer (left 1963)
- Roland and Almita Vamos – violinist, violist
- Jaap van Zweden – violinist, conductor
- Robert Vernon – violist
- F. Dudleigh Vernor – organist, composer
- Shirley Verrett – mezzo-soprano/soprano
- Frédérique Vézina – soprano
- Lucas Vidal – composer
- Joseph Villa – piano
- Verónica Villarroel – soprano
- Ezequiel Viñao – composer
- Andrew von Oeyen – pianist
- Paul Waggoner – guitarist, Between the Buried and Me
- Xun Wang – pianist
- Robert Ward – composer
- Katharine Mulky Warne – composer, founder of Milhaud Society
- Alexis Weissenberg – pianist
- June Weybright – composer, pianist
- Eric Whitacre – composer, conductor
- John Williams – composer, conductor
- Albert Cano Smit – pianist
- Meredith Willson – composer
- Ransom Wilson – flutist, conductor
- Mark Wood – electric violinist
- Phil Woods – clarinetist, saxophonist
- Shai Wosner – classical pianist
- Joyce Yang – pianist
- Yung Wook Yoo – pianist
- Rolande Maxwell Young – composer, pianist
- Terence Yung – pianist
- Camille Zamora – soprano
- Charlotte Lois Zelka – pianist
- Bernard Zinck – violinist
- Eva Maria Zuk – pianist
- Pinchas Zukerman – violinist, violist, and conductor

== Notable teachers ==
- Carolyn Adams – modern dancer, choreographer
- Samuel Adler – composer
- Bruce Adolphe – composer
- JoAnne Akalaitis – director
- Joseph Alessi – principal trombone of the New York Philharmonic
- Nancy Allen – harpist
- Baruch Arnon – piano, graduate studies, chamber music
- René Auberjonois – actor
- Emanuel Ax – pianist
- Sergei Babayan – pianist
- Milton Babbitt – composer
- Jeanne Behrend – pianist, musicologist, educator, and composer.
- Jon Robin Baitz – playwright
- Julius Baker – flutist
- Adele Laeis Baldwin – voice teacher, contralto
- Brian Bedford – actor
- Luciano Berio – composer, founded the Juilliard Ensemble
- Ron Blake – saxophonist
- Eric Bogosian – playwright
- Stephen Book - director, actor, acting teacher
- George Frederick Boyle – pianist
- Henry Brant – composer
- William Burden – voice teacher, tenor
- Kendall Durelle Briggs – music theorist, composer
- Bruce Brubaker – pianist
- Maria Callas – opera singer
- Elliott Carter – composer
- Ron Carter – double bass
- Antonio Ciacca – business of jazz
- Timothy Cobb – double bass
- Joseph Conyers – bassist
- John Corigliano – composer
- Alfredo Corvino – ballet master
- Frank Damrosch – composer
- Bella Davidovich – pianist
- Giuseppe De Luca – opera singer
- Dorothy DeLay – violinist
- Patricia Delgado – ballet
- James DePreist – conductor
- David Diamond – composer
- Glenn Dicterow – violinist
- Ania Dorfmann – pianist
- Elaine Douvas – oboe
- David Dubal – pianist, teacher, author, broadcaster, painter
- Lucia Dunham – soprano
- Christopher Durang – playwright
- Sixten Ehrling – conductor
- John Erskine – pianist, composer
- Simon Estes – opera singer
- Eric Ewazen – composition
- Daniel Felsenfeld – composition
- Daniel Ferro – voice teacher
- Rudolf Firkušný – pianist
- Irwin Freundlich – piano
- Joseph Fuchs – violinist
- Lillian Fuchs – violist
- Ivan Galamian – violinist
- Percy Goetschius – theory and composition
- Saul Goodman – timpanist
- Sascha Gorodnitzki – pianist
- Alicia Graf Mack – dancer, director of Dance Division
- Marcel Grandjany – harpist and composer
- John Guare – playwright
- Gerre Hancock – organist
- William Hickey – actor
- Martha Hill – dancer, director of Dance Division
- Hanya Holm – choreographer
- John Houseman – actor, producer
- Huang Ruo – composer
- Monica Huggett – baroque violinist
- Doris Humphrey – choreographer
- Ernest Hutcheson – pianist, composer
- Sharon Isbin – classical guitar
- Paul Jacobs – organist
- Rodney Jones – guitar
- Michael Kahn – director, acting teacher
- Joseph Kalichstein – pianist
- Hyo Kang – violin
- Lewis Kaplan – violinist
- Melvin Kaplan – oboist and founder of the Vermont Mozart Festival
- Yoheved Kaplinsky – pianist
- Jeffrey Khaner – flutist
- Florence Kimball – voice
- Frank Kimbrough – pianist
- Amy Beth Kirsten – composer
- Simon Kovar – bassoonist
- Joel Krosnick – cellist
- Tony Kushner – playwright
- Kenneth Lampl – composer
- Michael Langham – actor, director
- Jacob Lateiner – pianist
- Judith LeClair – principal bassoonist of the New York Philharmonic
- Eugene Levinson – principal bass of the New York Philharmonic
- Frank Lévy – pianist
- Josef Lhévinne – pianist
- Rosina Lhévinne – pianist
- José Limón – choreographer
- Romulus Linney – playwright
- Gene Lockhart – actor
- Arthur Lora – flautist
- Jerome Lowenthal – pianist
- Robert Wood Lynn – poet, winner of Yale Younger Poets Prize
- Jon Manasse – clarinetist
- Robert Mann – violinist, founder and first violinist of the Juilliard String Quartet
- Adele Marcus – pianist
- Wynton Marsalis – improvisation and trumpet
- Alberta Masiello – pianist and conductor
- João Carlos Martins – pianist
- William Masselos – pianist
- Dakin Matthews – actor
- Michael Mayer – director
- Terrence McNally – playwright
- Genia Melikova – ballet
- Peter Mennin – composer
- Homer Mensch – bassist
- Jeffrey Milarsky – music director, AXIOM Ensemble
- Andrew Norman – composer
- Marsha Norman – playwright
- Orin O'Brien – double bass
- Santos Ojeda – pianist
- Margaret Pardee – violinist
- Itzhak Perlman – violinist
- Vincent Persichetti – composer
- Ashan Pillai – violist
- Matthias Pintscher – composer
- Joseph Polisi – bassoonist
- Hilary Purrington – composer
- Erik Ralske – hornist
- Behzad Ranjbaran – theory
- Nadia Reisenberg – pianist
- Ruggiero Ricci – violinist
- David Robertson – conductor
- Christopher Rouse – composer
- Henning Rübsam – choreographer
- Leon Russianoff - clarinet
- Michel Saint-Denis – actor, director
- Olga Samaroff – pianist
- György Sándor – pianist
- Carl Schachter – Schenkerian analyst
- Peter Schickele – composer, humorist, best known for his P. D. Q. Bach character
- William Schimmel – composer, accordionist
- Alan Schneider – director
- William Schuman – composer, winner of the Pulitzer Prize for Music, founder of the Juilliard String Quartet
- Roger Sessions – composer, winner of the Pulitzer Prize for Music
- Marian Seldes – actor
- Marcella Sembrich – voice teacher
- Orli Shaham – pianist
- Harvey Shapiro – cello teacher
- Oscar Shumsky – violinist
- Abbey Simon – pianist
- Liz Smith – actor
- W. Stephen Smith – voice teacher
- Bern Nadette Stanis – actor, dancer
- Anna Sokolow – choreographer
- David Soyer – cellist
- Clifton Taylor – theatrical designer
- Léon Theremin
- Andrew Thomas – composition
- Tracie Thoms – actress
- Antony Tudor – choreographer
- William Vacchiano – trumpeter
- Melinda Wagner – composer
- Wendy Wasserstein – playwright
- Grace Welsh – pianist, composer
- Earl Wild – pianist
- Teddy Wilson – pianist
- Stefan Wolpe – composer
- Oxana Yablonskaya – pianist

=== Resident ensembles ===
- American Brass Quintet
- Juilliard String Quartet

== School presidents ==
- Frank Damrosch (1904–1926)
- John Erskine (1926–1937)
- Ernest Hutcheson (1937–1945)
- William Schuman (1946–1961)
- Peter Mennin (1962–1984)
- Joseph W. Polisi (1984–2018)
- Damian Woetzel (2018–present)
