= Samuel Leibowitz =

Romanian-born American attorney (1893–1978)

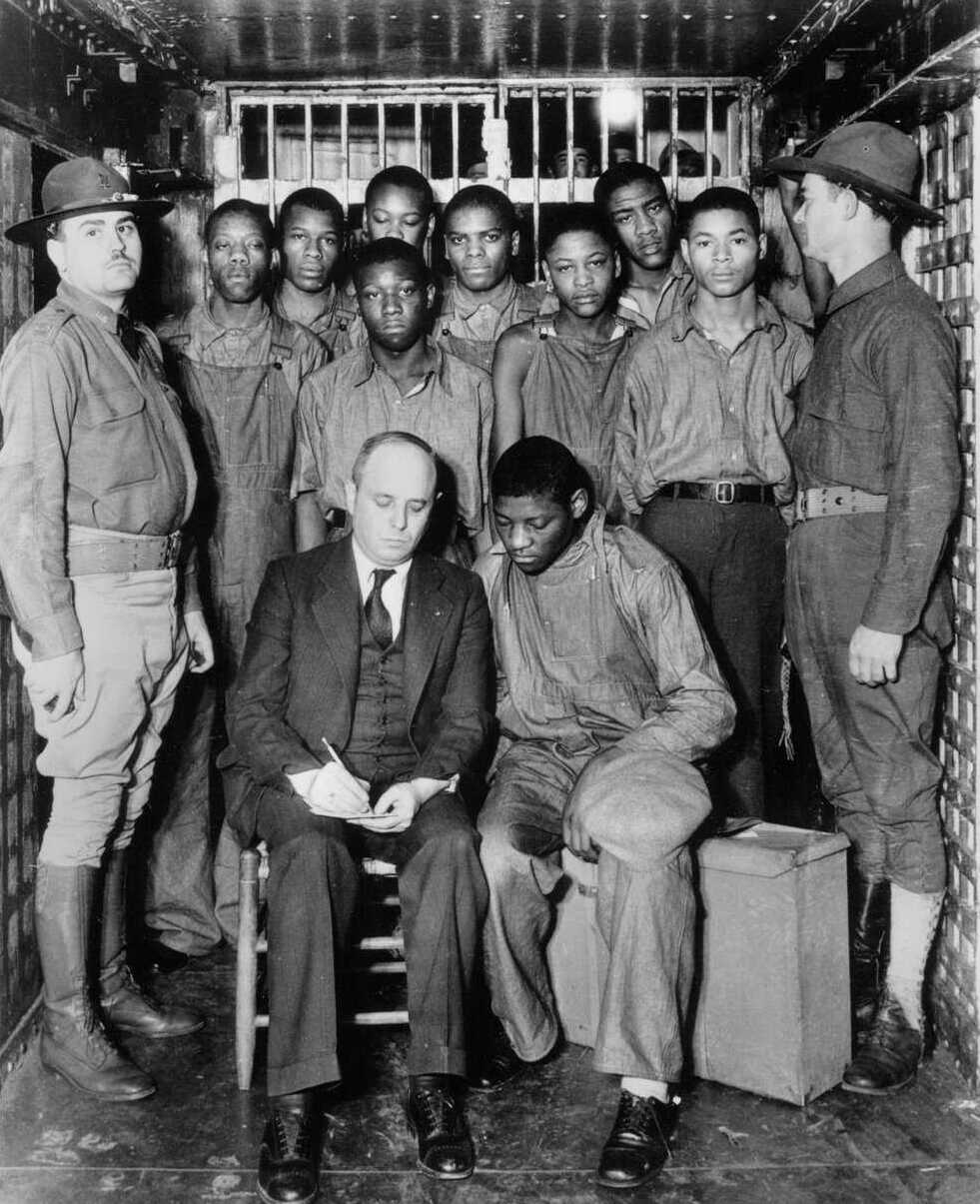
- Leibowitz photographed with the Scottsboro Boys in 1933
- Born: Samuel Simon Leibowitz; August 14, 1893; Iași, Romania
- Died: January 11, 1978 (aged 84); New York City, US
- Education: Cornell University (BA, LLB)
- Occupation: Lawyer
- Known for: Defending the Scottsboro Boys
- Spouse: Belle Munves (m. 1919)
- Children: Marjorie, Robert and Lawrence

Samuel Simon Leibowitz (August 14, 1893 – January 11, 1978) was a Romanian-born American criminal defense attorney. He was best known for representing the Scottsboro Boys, and later became a justice of the New York State Supreme Court.

== Early life ==
Samuel Simon Leibowitz was born in Iași, Kingdom of Romania, on August 14, 1893. He was the first child of Romanian Jewish immigrants, Isaac and Bina Lebeau, and arrived in New York City on March 14, 1897. A neighbor recommended that Isaac Lebeau should Americanize his last name to prosper even further as a businessman and so it was changed to Leibowitz.

The family lived in a tenement on Essex Street on the Lower East Side. His father had a small shop in East New York. He graduated from Jamaica High School and received his undergraduate degree from Cornell University. He then graduated from Cornell Law School in 1915.

He married Belle Munves on December 25, 1919 and fathered three children.

== Representation of Scottsboro Boys ==
Although he worked as counsel in dozens of notorious trials, Leibowitz is best remembered as counsel for the Scottsboro Boys, nine Southern African-American youths who were falsely accused of rape and sentenced to death in Alabama in 1931. After the US Supreme Court overturned the convictions in Powell v. Alabama (1932), Leibowitz was brought into the case by the International Labor Defense, an affiliate of the Communist Party of the United States. Many people expressed surprise that the Communists would ask Leibowitz to lead the Scottsboro defense, as he was not communist or radical but a mainstream Democrat who had never been associated with class-based causes. The choice of Leibowitz convinced many that the Communists were serious about achieving justice for the Alabama defendant and not interested only in making political hay. Leibowitz was asked to accept as co-counsel, by the ILD's chief attorney, Joseph R. Brodsky.

After reading the record of the first trials and becoming convinced of the defendants' innocence, Leibowitz accepted the ILD's offer. He did so against the urgings of his wife and many friends, who told him that he had no chance defending African-American defendants accused of raping white women in the Alabama of the 1930s. Leibowitz would work for the next four years on the cases without pay or reimbursement for most of his expenses.

Leibowitz quickly became an object of loathing around Decatur when he opened his defense of Haywood Patterson, the first defendant to be retried, by challenging Alabama's exclusion of blacks from the jury rolls. Local hatred of Leibowitz grew uglier, as death threats were made against him after his tough cross-examination of the alleged victim Victoria Price. One national reporter overheard several people saying, "It'll be a wonder if he gets out of here alive." Five uniformed members of the National Guard were assigned to protect him during the trial, with another 150 available to defend against a possible lynch mob. The famous photo above was widely distributed to show the extent to which Leibowitz and these defendants had to be protected by the National Guard to keep the mob away from them during the Decatur trials.

Leibowitz was stunned by the jury's guilty verdict in Patterson's 1933 trial. He compared the verdict to "the act of spitting on the tomb of Abraham Lincoln." Back in New York after the trial, Leibowitz vowed to defend the defendants "until hell freezes over." Speaking before enthusiastic audiences sometimes numbering in the thousands, he promised to take guilty verdicts to the US Supreme Court and back until Alabama finally gave up: "It'll be a merry-go-round, and if some Ku Kluxer doesn't put a bullet through my head, I'll go right along until they let the passengers off." Leibowitz's determined efforts won the affection of his clients. Haywood Patterson said of Leibowitz, "I love him more than life itself."

After an Alabama judge ordered a new trial for Patterson and the state transferred the cases to the courtroom of Judge William Callahan, Leibowitz's frustration grew. Virtually every motion or objection that Leibowitz made before Callahan was denied or overruled, and virtually every motion or objection made by the prosecution was granted or sustained. His anger showed, and Leibowitz found himself mocked, scolded, and reprimanded by the judge. After guilty verdicts and death sentences were handed to Patterson and Norris, a battle for control of the case ensued between Leibowitz and the ILD. Leibowitz's anger with the ILD exploded after two of its attorneys had been charged with attempting to bribe Victoria Price.

After the defendants' convictions were affirmed by the Alabama Supreme Court, Leibowitz appeared before the US Supreme Court to participate in the appeal of Patterson's and Norris's convictions on the ground that blacks were systematically excluded from Alabama's juries. When Leibowitz alleged that the names of blacks appearing on jury rolls were fraudulently added after Patterson's trial began, Chief Justice Charles Evans Hughes asked Leibowitz if he could prove that allegation. Leibowitz, having anticipated that question, had caused the jury roll books to be brought to Washington. He asked a page to hand the jury rolls and a magnifying glass up to the chief justice. The documents were passed from Justice to Justice, which was highly unusual during oral argument in the Supreme Court, and the facial reactions of the eight Justices sitting indicated their disgust. The Supreme Court again reversed the defendants' convictions in Norris v. Alabama, a decision that Leibowitz called a "triumph for American justice."

After a third set of trials, Leibowitz began to involve himself again in projects unrelated to Scottsboro. He met on death row several times with Bruno Hauptmann, the German immigrant convicted of kidnapping Charles Lindbergh's baby, in the hopes of convincing him to reveal details of the crime.

In early 1937, after a series of secret meetings with Thomas Knight, Leibowitz reluctantly agreed to a compromise, which would result in the release of four of the Scottsboro Boys and allow prosecutions to again go forward against the others. Of the compromise, Leibowitz said, "I say yes, but with a heavy heart, and I feel very badly about it." In the next set of Scottsboro trials, Leibowitz allowed a local attorney to assume the more visible role while he did the coaching. Leibowitz and others concerned with the Scottsboro Boys' welfare feared that the trials might become a referendum on Leibowitz himself, who had become more unpopular than ever in northern Alabama.

After his work on the Scottsboro Boys case was finished, Leibowitz returned to his New York practice.

== Representation of Robert Irwin ==
In June 1937, he undertook the representation of Robert George Irwin, a former mental patient who was accused of murdering pulp magazine model Veronica Gedeon, her mother, and a roomer in New York City during Easter Weekend. During a nationwide search for Irwin, New York detectives announced their belief that Irwin was insane, but after Irwin had turned himself in, they indicted him for first degree-murder and claimed that he was now sane. Early in trial, Leibowitz negotiated a plea bargain under which Irwin avoided the death penalty but would remain in custody for the rest of his life.

== Judicial career ==
In 1940, Leibowitz was elected to serve a 14-year term as a judge of the Kings County Court, which was the principal trial court for criminal matters in Brooklyn. After briefly considering a third-party nomination for Mayor of New York City, Leibowitz was re-elected to his judgeship in 1954. When the County Courts in New York City were merged into the trial-level New York State Supreme Court in 1962 as part of a court reorganization that year, Leibowitz's title changed to New York State Supreme Court Justice. Over the years, Leibowitz heard a number of cases concerning gang activity and organized crime. He also presided over the criminal trial of the Brooklyn Dodgers manager Leo Durocher for assaulting a fan at Ebbets Field in 1945.

Leibowitz developed a reputation as both a tough judge and a "hanging judge." A staunch advocate of the death penalty, he publicly advocated its retention as a deterrent.

During Leibowitz's judicial career, his national fame increased in 1950, when he was the subject of an admiring biography by the journalist Quentin Reynolds. He was also criticized, however, for lapses in judicial temperament such as losing his temper with litigants and witnesses in his court. When Leibowitz reached the age of 70, he was subject to mandatory retirement unless a board of his fellow judges certified him as fit for continued service. The Association of the Bar of the City of New York controversially opposed his redesignation to the bench. Leibowitz was eventually reappointed, however, and served until 1969, when he reached the final mandatory retirement age of 76.

== Death and legacy ==
Leibowitz died on January 11 1978, aged 84, in New York City. A collection of his personal and legal papers spanning the years from 1939 to 1976 is housed at the Cornell University Library. Lawyer Irving Younger is named for Leibowitz.

Leibowitz was portrayed by Timothy Hutton in Heavens Fall, a 2006 film based on the Scottsboro Boys incident of 1931.

Leibowitz appears as a character in the Kander and Ebb musical "The Scottsboro Boys (musical)."

== See also ==
- Julia Nussenbaum, where he was the defense attorney for Mischa Rosenbaum
- Southern Poverty Law Center

== Sources ==
- Cornell University Library, Division of Rare Books and Manuscript Collections, "Guide to the Samuel Simon Leibowitz Papers, 1939–1976.
- Cornell Law Library, Scottsboro Trials Collection.
- "Jurist Before the Bar, Time, November 15, 1963.
- Quentin Reynolds, Courtroom: The Story of Samuel S. Leibowitz (New York: Farrar, Straus & Co., 1950).
- Kill the Jew From New York. Decatur, Alabama, 1933.
- History Channel
- A film clip "Longines Chronoscope with Samuel S. Leibowiata (SIC)" is available for viewing at the Internet Archive
