= G. Duncan Bauman =

American journalist

George Duncan Bauman (April 12, 1912 – April 14, 2003) was the publisher of the St. Louis Globe-Democrat from 1967 until 1984.

He was born in Humboldt, Iowa, in 1912, the son of Peter William Bauman, Sr. (1886–1976) and Mae Marguerite (Duncan) Bauman (1890–1971), daughter of Alexander Hood Duncan (1859–1942), who owned a furniture store and mortuary in Humboldt. He had two siblings: a sister, Virginia Mae (Mrs. Louis P. Matthei, M.D.) (1915–1996) and Peter William, Jr. (Mary Jane Christine) (1919–2001). George Bauman graduated from Loyola Academy in Chicago, class of 1930, and attended and graduated from Loyola University Chicago from 1930 to 1935.

After graduation, Bauman began his work in journalism as a reporter for the Chicago Herald-Examiner. There, he was involved in the surrender of Robert George Irwin, wanted for the Easter weekend murder of girlfriend Veronica Gedeon, her mother, and a boarder. The Herald-Examiner had paid Irwin $5,000 for the exclusive rights to Irwin’s confession and surrender to authorities.

Bauman temporarily left journalism in 1939, moving to St. Louis to work as an architectural representative for the paint manufacturer Pratt & Lambert Inc. In 1943, however, he returned, joining the St. Louis Globe-Democrat as a reporter. He became the assistant city editor (while attending the School of Law at Washington University in St. Louis, where he graduated in 1948). Bauman was promoted to the newspaper’s personnel manager in 1951. In 1959, after the newspaper had been purchased by the Newhouse family in 1955 and had entered into a joint operating agreement with its principal competitor, the St. Louis Post-Dispatch, he became the Globe-Democrat's business manager. In 1967, he was named to succeed Richard Amberg as its publisher.

A major difference between the St. Louis dailies concerned their policies of civic involvement. While the Pulitzer family’s Post-Dispatch formally prohibited its staff from most involvement in local organizations to avoid conflicts of interest, the Globe-Democrat encouraged it, and Bauman was particularly active in St. Louis civic organizations. From 1957 to 1961 he served as the secretary of the St. Louis Board of Election Commissioners.

The editorial position of the Globe-Democrat was more conservative and blue-collar-oriented than position of the Post-Dispatch. In 1962 Bauman hired Patrick J. Buchanan, newly graduated from the Missouri School of Journalism, to the editorial page staff.

A special congressional committee investigating efforts by the Federal Bureau of Investigation to discredit Martin Luther King Jr. suggested that a March 30, 1968 Globe-Democrat editorial critical of Dr. King was inspired and ghostwritten by the FBI, which considered the newspaper’s publisher to be “especially cooperative to the bureau.” While recognizing that the Globe-Democrat’s editorial was protected by the First Amendment, the Committee was highly critical of “the ease with which the Bureau had been able to use the newspaper for its counterintelligence initiatives.” The Committee found that, not only did the FBI’s conduct “contribute to the hostile climate that surrounded Dr. King, it was morally reprehensible, illegal, felonious, and unconstitutional.”

In 1983, the Pulitzers and Samuel Irving Newhouse, Jr. entered into an agreement under which the Globe-Democrat would fold, and Newhouse News Service would receive a share of the resulting profits of the Post-Dispatch. Thus, in October 1983 Bauman announced the end of his newspaper, effective December 31, 1983. However, the United States Department of Justice Antitrust Division insisted that Newhouse seek out a purchaser, and in December 1983 a sale to Jeffrey M. Gluck was announced. Bauman retired, however, and by 1986 the newspaper closed for good.

Bauman was married twice: First to Nora Catherine Kelly (1913–1990), from 1938 until her death. In 1991, Bauman married Lucy Beatrice (Hencke) Hume, widow of Fred Hume, a St. Louis businessman who had worked with Bauman at the Globe-Democrat in the 1940s. Bauman had no children.

In 1999 Bauman and co-author Mary Kimbrough published a memoir, Behind the Headlines: Stories About People and Events Which Shaped St. Louis. In 2006, he was inducted into the Hall of Fame of the Missouri History Museum.
