= Romain Hervé =

French musician

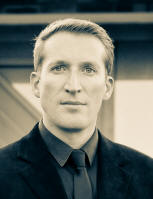

Romain Hervé (born 9 August 1977) is a French classical pianist.

== Biography ==
Born in Rennes in 1977, Hervé is considered "one of the most talented pianists of his generation". (Le nouveau musicien, May 2005).

Product of the poetic school of French piano, taught by Pierre Froment (a student of Alfred Cortot) and Bruno Rigutto (a student of Samson François) at the Conservatoire de Musique in Paris, Romain Herve took first prizes in piano and chamber music, was awarded advanced studies diplomas with highest honours in the same disciplines, and subsequently entered the postgraduate programme.

He has also received advice from Lazar Berman, Georges Cziffra, Dimitri Bashkirov, Leon Fleisher, Jan-Marisse Huizing, and Lev Naumov.

Named "Artistic discovery of March 2003" by the French magazine Classica, Hervé won the first prize at the Radio France Competition. He is also prizewinner of the Cziffra Foundation, the Banque Populaire Foundation and award-winner of the Polignac Festival and at the international competition of the "Societe des Arts" in Geneva.

Hervé's appearances in France, in recital or as a soloist with orchestra, have included performances at the Salle Pleyel, at the Salle Gaveau with the European Romantic Orchestra, at the Maison de Radio France with the Orchestre de la Garde Républicaine, at the Cité de la Musique with Paris Conservatoire Orchestra, at the Salle Cortot, the auditoriums of the Palais Royal and at the Musée Grévin.

International guest performances have taken him to Germany (NDR Concert Hall in Hanover), The Netherlands (in Nijmegen, Bergen, and at the Amsterdam Concertgebouw), Singapore (Esplanade Concert Hall with the Singapore National Youth Orchestra), South Korea (Seoul Arts Center, concert hall) Switzerland (in Interlaken, Saint-Ursanne, at the Palais de l'Athenee and the Ansermet Studio in Geneva), Great Britain (with the Nottingham Youth Orchestra), Italy (Casagrande Theatre), Belgium, and Spain.

He has participated in several television and radio broadcasts, including France 3, France Inter, France Culture, France Musique, RTL, Radio Suisse Romande, NDR Kultur.

== Recordings ==
- Chopin (CAL 9362): Polish dances (polonaises "héroïque", "militaire", Andante spianato et grande polonaise, mazurkas...) Calliope Records
- Liszt: Variations Weinen, Klagen, Sorgen, Zagen, 2 Légends, Venezia e Napoli, Harmonies du soir, Hungarian rhapsody n°6 (CAL 9349)
- Talents de pianistes (HMX 2908192) Harmonia Mundi Records, with Alexandre Tharaud, Pascal Amoyel, Racha Arodaky, Frank Braley, Romain Hervé, Cédric Tiberghien, Ferenc Vizi, Hélène Couvert, Jérôme Ducros, Paul Lewis.

His Liszt (CAL 9349) and Chopin (CAL 9362) recordings have been warmly welcomed by the critics: A great favourite-RTL by Alain Duault ("his musical intelligence joins together with his natural intelligence"), R10 from Classica/Repertoire magazine ("this magnificent recital offers us the revelation of a marvellous pianist"), Pianist's Recording of the Year ("One of the best current discs"), 5 tuning forks from Diapason magazine ("this interpretation is in line with a Rubinstein") and 4 stars from the Monde de la Musique in which Michel Le Naour wrote: "For his elegance, modesty and grace, Romain Herve shows that French piano playing has many wonderful years ahead of it".
