= Bernard Zinck =

French-born violinist and pedagogue (born 1965)

- Born: May 30, 1965 (age 61); Tours, Indre-et-Loire, France
- Genres: Classical
- Occupations: Violinist, Teacher
- Instrument: 1690 G.B. Rogeri (Fiebelmann)
- Website: https://www.bernardzinck.com/

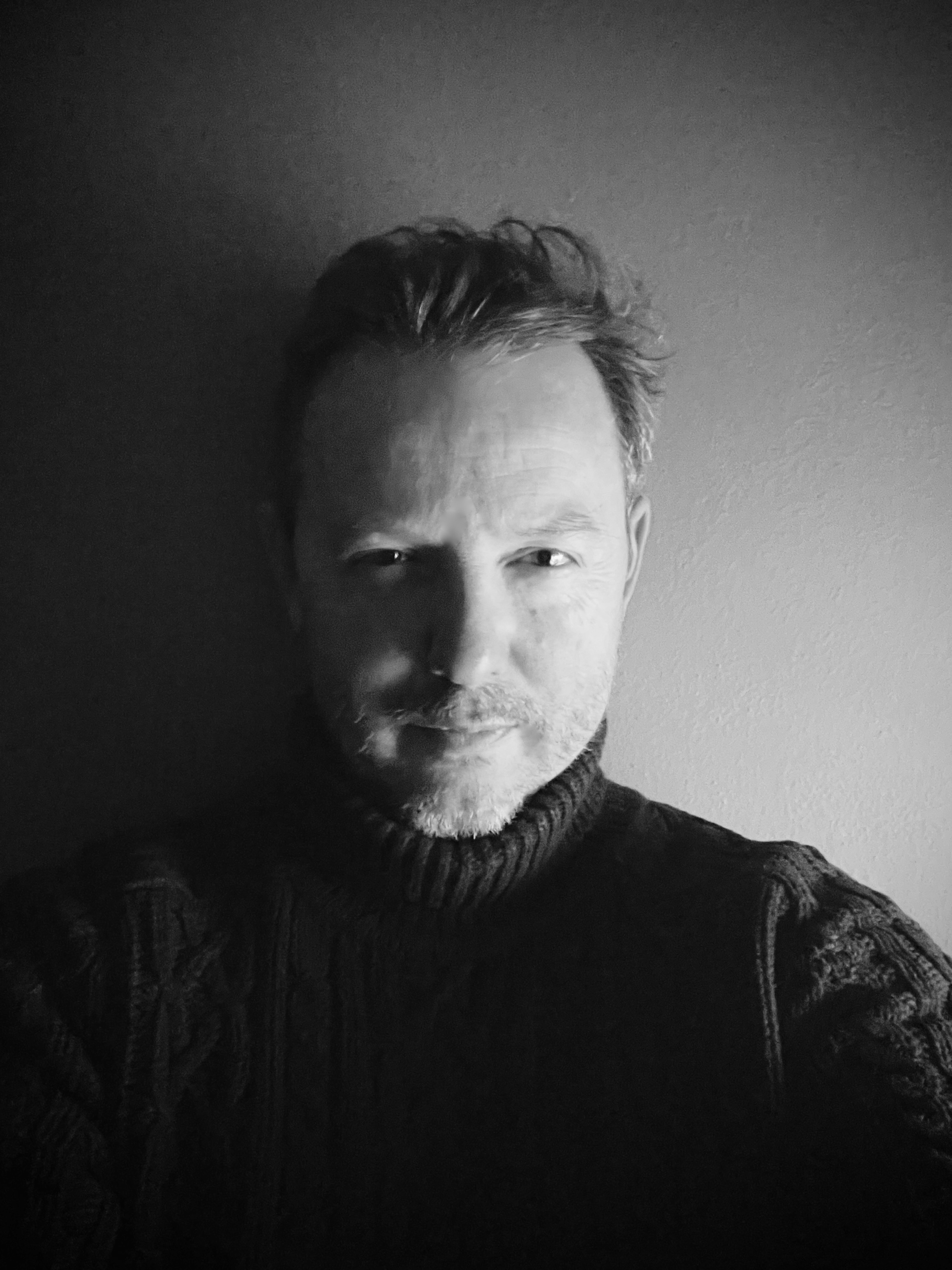

Bernard Zinck is a French-born violinist and pedagogue who spends most of his performing and teaching career in the United States and France. He plays the Fiebelmann Rogeri, considered one of the finest violins made by Italian luthier Giovanni Battista Rogeri.

== Early life and education ==
Bernard Zinck was born in Tours, France, on May 30, 1965. His parents, both English teachers, met in London at the coronation of Queen Elisabeth II in 1952 while completing their doctoral degrees.

At age six, he began studying violin at the Conservatoire Francis Poulenc (CRR) in Tours. At 16, In 1981, he entered the Conservatoire Supérieur de Musique de Paris (CNSMDP), where he studied with Gérard Poulet and Geneviève Joy-Dutilleux. At the CNSMDP, he won First Prize in both violin and Chamber Music.

After joining the Orchestre des Prix du Conservatoire for two years, he moved to the United States. In 1987, he won a Fulbright scholarship to attend the Juilliard School. There, he studied violin and chamber music with Joseph Fuchs and Felix Galimir. After obtaining both a Bachelor of Music (1991) and Master of Music (1992) from Juilliard, he returned to France. in 1992, he won the Prix de la Fondation Yehudi Menuhin in Paris. In 2006, he received a doctoral degree (DMA) from Temple University in Philadelphia; his thesis was on the eighteenth-century French creole violinist, the Chevalier de Saint-George.

In addition to his studies at the CNSMDP and Juilliard, he also studied with Tibor Varga in Sion, Maya Glezarova and Géza Kapás in Tours, Nathan Milstein in Zurich and Lewis Kaplan at Bowdoin International Music Festival.

== Musical career ==
In 1989, Zinck made his orchestral debut performing Tchaikovsky’s violin concerto with the Orchestre Symphonique Région Centre-Val de Loire/Tours (OSRC-T). Soon after, he performed Bach’s concerto for two violins with Pierre Amoyal whose agent, Thérèse Darras (Musicaglotz) started guiding his career. After winning the Yehudi Menuhin Trust Award in 1992, he was invited by Yehudi Menuhin to perform in his Reims and Saumur music festivals. Since then, his talent and interpretive insight have made him a sought-after soloist who has performed extensively in concerts and recitals in Europe, the United States, Canada, Mexico, Haiti, Brazil, South Korea and Japan. In 2022, he created the chamber music festival Musiques et Vignes en Confluence that presents concerts and wine tastings in the Loire Valley. In 2024, the festival will be in residence at the Abbaye St Pierre in Bourgueil. Since 2023, Bernard Zinck has been a member of the New York Classical Music Society.

He has performed recitals with pianists including Elena Abend, Racha Arodaki, Lucia Barrenechea, François Chaplin, Carole Chicha, David Korevaar, Irène Kudela, Denis Pascal, May Phang, David Selig and François Weigel. He also enjoys pushing musical boundaries and often collaborates with organists and dancers (Erick Hawkins Dance Company, Simone Ferro, UWM Dance Department).

Zinck has performed in Paris at the Athénée Théâtre Louis Jouvet, Théâtre du Châtelet, Théâtre du Musée Grévin, and Festival de Montmartre, Les Flâneries de Reims, La Grange de Meslay, Musicales de Montsoreau, Radio-France festival in Montpellier, Rencontres Musicales de Calenzana, Théâtre Impérial in Compiègne, and at the cathedrals of Alençon, Clamecy, Le Mans, Sées and Tours (France); Brighton Arts (U.K.); Salzburg Mozarteum (Austria); Liszt Academy in Budapest (Hungary); Euregio Maas-Rijn Organ Festival (Holland); Szymanowski Festival in Zakopane (Poland and Sicily); Basilica San Clemente in Rome and Orsanmichele Church in Florence (Italy); Oscar Peterson Hall in Montreal (Canada), Weill Hall at Carnegie Recital Hall, the National Gallery and Phillips Collection in Washington DC, Dame Myra Hess Series at the Cultural Center and Rush Hour at St James Cathedral in Chicago, Santa Fe Concert Association (U.S.A.); Sala Cecília Meireles in Rio de Janeiro and the International Chamber Music Festival of Paraíba (Brazil); Oji Hall and Shirakawa Hall (Japan).

In Paris, Zinck gave the European premiere of Chebaline’s Concertino for violin and strings op. 14/1 with the Orchestre National de la Garde Républicaine. He has appeared as guest soloist with many orchestras, including the Hungarian National Philharmonic, Bohemia Symphony, Radio-Television Orchestra of Romania, the New Mexico Symphony, San Juan Symphony, Orquesta Sinfónica de Chihuahua, and the Porto Alegre, Unisinos, Caxias and Camargo Guarnieri symphony orchestras in Brazil.

His artistry has been praised in terms such as "impeccable accuracy of pitch" and "formidable technique". The Strad Magazine noted his "round and opulent tone” and his "vibrato bringing moments of sheer ecstasy”, while Fanfare Magazine was impressed by the "singing, sensuous, sumptuous, shimmering” quality of his playing, which the French Figaro summed up in the expression "violon solaire”.

== Instrument ==
Since 2002, Bernard Zinck plays the Rogeri “Feibelmann”, a Giovanni Battista Rogeri violin, dated 1690 - a purchase made possible with the support of the Bass family. He also owns a Joseph Klotz violin, dated 1779, and a Joseph Henry bow, dated 1860.

== Teaching career ==
A committed educator, Dr. Zinck is currently Associate Professor of Violin and Chamber Music and Head of the String Area at the University of Wisconsin-Milwaukee. He is also the artistic director and co-founder of the Lakeside Chamber Music that presents workshops in the greater Chicago area. In 2018, he was awarded the “Certificate of Excellence in Studio Teaching” by Civic Music Association in Milwaukee.

He began his teaching career at the University of New Mexico. He has served on the faculty of the Köln Summer Institute in Montepulciano, the International Lyric Academy of Rome and the Tuscia Operafestival (Italy), Music in the Alps in Courchevel, Holy Trinity Summer Music camp in Haiti, and Eastern Music Festival where he served as “Distinguished Teaching Artist” in 2019. Since 2022, he has joined the faculty of the Flaine Summer Academy in the French Alps.

Since 2010, Zinck has piloted free community-based concerts and lectures, providing opportunities for senior citizen to hear music and lectures outside of the traditional concert and university campus venues.

== Recordings and publications ==
- Karol Szymanowski: L’oeuvre complète pour Violon et Piano, ASIN B000002K3O

Ligia Digital, 1997

Musical Heritage Society Inc., 1999

- Live From France: Violin/Cello Recital (Ravel, Kodály, Bach, Ysaÿe)

Musical Heritage Society Inc., 2000

- Uncommon Voices: Music of Burt Levy and Yehuda Yannay

Modern Austrian Masters, 2007

- "The Chevalier de Saint-George: His Violin Style and Eighteenth-Century Musical Aesthetics”

DMA Thesis, Temple University, Philadelphia, 2006

- First Person by “Performing Injuries in Performing Arts: Coping and Recovering” Strings Magazine, April 2016

One of his performance at the Rush Hour concerts was featured on NBC Nightly News with Brian Williams and he has been featured on many television and radio broadcasts and videos in France and the United States.

In 2006, he wrote his doctoral thesis: "The Chevalier de Saint-George: His Violin Style and Eighteenth-Century Musical Aesthetics”. His thesis presents the eighteenth-century French creole violinist, Chevalier de Saint-George, a remarkable figure of the French Enlightenment whose compositions Zinck has researched, lectured on and performed in Montreal's Black History Month, Chicago Festival de la Francophonie, and Venice EACLALS triennial conference.

In 2016, he wrote an article "Coping and recovering from Injuries"that was published by String Magazine.

In 2021, he wrote an article "Dealing with Dystonia" that was published by The Strad.

== Awards ==
- 1984 - Premier Prix in Violin, Conservatoire Supérieur de Musique de Paris
- 1985 - Premier Prix in Chamber Music, Conservatoire Supérieur de Musique de Paris
- 1986 - Bourse du Conseil Général d’Indre-et-Loire
- 1987 - Fulbright Foreign Student Program Award, The Juilliard School
- 1992 - Prix de la Fondation Yehudi Menuhin, Paris
- 1995 - Russell Conwell Fellowship, Temple University
- 2000 - Who’s Who Among Students in American Universities and Colleges
- 2006 - Who’s Who Among Students in American Universities and Colleges
- 2013 - UWM Student Success Award (demonstrating continuous dedication to the academic success of learners as recognized by UWM students)
- 2018 - Certificate of Excellence in Studio Teaching, Civic Music Association, Milwaukee

== Personal life ==
Along with his husband Bernard Garbo, Zinck divides his time between homes in Milwaukee and Candes St Martin, where he serves as consultant for the Association Joy-Dutilleux.
