= Wang Xun =

Wang Xun may refer to:

- Wang Xun (calligrapher) (349–400), Jin dynasty calligrapher
- Wang Zhongsi (704–748), Tang dynasty general, birth name Wang Xun
- Wang Xun (physicist) (1934–2025), Chinese physicist, member of the Chinese Academy of Sciences
- Wang Xun (actor) (born 1974), Chinese actor
- Wang Xun (pianist) (born 1979), Chinese pianist

== See also ==
- Hyeonjong of Goryeo (992–1031), personal name Wang Sun (王詢; Wáng Xún), the 8th ruler of the Goryeo dynasty of Korea
