= Jader Bignamini =

Italian conductor and clarinetist

Jader Bignamini (born 1976 in Crema, Lombardy, Italy) is an Italian conductor and clarinetist.

== Biography ==
As a child, Bignamini became interested in the clarinet. He formally studied music at the Conservatorio Nicolini Piacenza. He joined the Orchestra Sinfonica di Milano Giuseppe Verdi (La Verdi) as a clarinetist. He further developed his interest in conducting whilst a member of La Verdi, and became an assistant conductor of La Verdi in 2010. He later became associate conductor of La Verdi. His professional debut as a conductor was at age 28. He now has the title of resident conductor with La Verdi, where his conducting mentors have included Riccardo Chailly.

In North America, Bignamini first conducted at Santa Fe Opera in July 2015. His first conducting appearance at the Metropolitan Opera was in November 2017. In June 2018, he guest-conducted the Detroit Symphony Orchestra as an emergency substitute for Leonard Slatkin. He returned to Detroit in October 2019 for a further guest-conducting engagement with the orchestra. Then, in January 2020, the orchestra announced the appointment of Bignamini as its next music director, effective in the 2020–2021 season, with an initial contract of 6 seasons. This appointment marked the conductor's first music directorship. In December 2023, the orchestra announced the extension of Bignamini's contract as music director through to the 2030–2031 season while announcing a plan to record Wynton Marsalis' Blues Symphony. The album was released in March 2025.

Bignamini and his wife Lidia, herself a clarinetist, have two children. The family resides in Cremona.
