= Selma Epstein =

American concert pianist

- Born: Selma Schechtman; August 14, 1927; New York City, US
- Died: November 21, 2014 (aged 87); Pflugerville, Texas, US
- Education: The Juilliard School
- Occupation: Concert pianist
- Spouse: Joseph Epstein

Selma Epstein (August 14, 1927 – November 21, 2014) was an American concert pianist, teacher, and champion of contemporary music by women and African Americans.

== Biography ==
Born August 14, 1927, in Brooklyn, New York, to Tillie (Schneider) and Samuel Schechtman, Selma excelled in mathematics at school, but pursued her love of music.

=== Career ===
She performed at 15 at Carnegie Hall and went on to attend the Juilliard School in New York City. There she became the youngest student of famed Ukrainian-born pianist Rosina Lhévinne. Selma moved on to gain the D. Hendrick Ezerman Foundation Scholarship at the Philadelphia Conservatory of Music in Philadelphia and studied with Eduard Steuermann there.

Selma married Joseph Epstein in 1950.

In the 1960’s she was invited to be the first pianist to present a series of all contemporary pieces in the Far East and founded the Baltimore Washington Contemporary Music Group. In addition to her performances and teaching duties, she gave private lessons.

As a concert pianist, Selma Epstein toured Europe and North America many times in addition to "two very successful tours in Australia. During her second tour, she was invited to teach at the New South Wales Conservatorium of Music. From 1972 to 1975 Epstein was a resident recording artist for the Australian Broadcasting Company, where she recorded several unpublished works of Australian-born composer Percy Grainger."

She promoted 20th-century Black and female composers and toured the world for many decades to bring attention to their music.

=== Later years ===
A visual artist, Epstein liked to draw using charcoal, pastels and paints.

She died at 87 on November 21, 2014, at her home in Pflugerville, Texas.

== Archives ==
In 2002, Epstein gifted a large collection of memorabilia, music and recordings to the Library Congress, where it is held as the "Selma Epstein Collection, 1931–1987." The five-box collection includes scores, art music, chamber music, concerti grossi, songs, albums (books), concert programs, promotional materials, manuscripts and clippings (information artifacts). An inventory of her recorded material can be found in the Music Division's collection file.

== Selected publications ==
- Epstein, S. (1990). A Guide for Researching Music by Women Composers. Chromattica USA. (book)
- Epstein, S. (1994). Composer Interview: Ruth Schonthal, Journal of the IAWM (International Alliance for Women in Music), February 1994, pp. 5–8.
