= Robert George Irwin =

American murderer (1907–1975)

- Born: Fenelon Arroyo Seco Irwin; August 5, 1907; Arroyo Seco Park, Pasadena, California, U.S.
- Died: 1975 (aged 67–68); Fishkill, New York, U.S.
- Known for: Beekman Hill murders
- Conviction: Second-degree murder (3 counts)
- Penalty: 139-years-to-life

Robert George Irwin (August 5, 1907 – 1975) was an American artist, sculptor, and recurring mental hospital patient who pleaded guilty to killing three people on Easter weekend in 1937 in the Beekman Hill area of New York City's Turtle Bay neighborhood.

One of his victims, Veronica "Ronnie" Gedeon, was a model who often appeared in seductive pulp magazine pictures. The crime, its investigation, Irwin's arrest, and the resulting court proceedings were heavily media publicized, often with eye-catching photos of Gedeon and headlines describing Irwin as the "mad sculptor." Veronica Gedeon left behind a portfolio of sexy photos that in retrospect, had no relevance to the crime, its cause, or Irwin's responsibility for it. However, that coincidence kept the story on front pages of newspapers around the country for months, and that publicity ultimately helped to bring Irwin into custody.

Irwin's prosecution, which ended through a plea bargain that kept him incarcerated for life, renewed debate about the use and scope of New York State's version of the insanity defense. Once sentenced, Irwin was deemed "definitely insane" by state psychiatrists. He spent the rest of his life in secure mental institutions.

Harold Schechter's 2014 book The Mad Sculptor tells Irwin's life story.

== Personal background ==
The son of evangelist parents, Irwin was reportedly born in a tent on an old-fashioned camp meeting ground in Portland, Oregon. However, he was actually born in the Arroyo Seco Park near Pasadena, California on August 5, 1907. He was named for the nearby river (as was the park) and one of his father's favorite theologians, François Fénelon. Hence, he entered life as Fenelon Arroyo Seco Irwin. He later changed his name, much to the horror of his devout mother, to honor his philosophical idol the agnostic Robert G. Ingersoll. His father was Reverend Benjamin Hardin Irwin, a nationally known figure in the Holiness movement who had founded a racially-integrated radical Holiness denomination in 1898 at a national convention in legally-segregated Anderson, South Carolina. He denounced as sinful everything from Coca-Cola to wearing ties. (The body that Irwin founded is now known as the International Pentecostal Holiness Church.) In 1900, a sexual scandal ended his career with the Fire-Baptized Holiness Church and the senior Irwin went solo. In Canada, sometime during 1902, he married Robert's mother, Mary Lee Jordan of Texas, without divorcing his first wife. His father deserted the family before Robert was three years old, which left them impoverished. When a family court judge noted that Robert could learn a trade at a state reformatory, he volunteered and spent 15 months there, where he first learned to sculpt. He soon idolized Lorado Taft, one of the leading American sculptors of the late 19th and early 20th centuries, and later moved in with Taft's family. Then, working for a waxworks studio in Los Angeles, he carved commercial busts of President Franklin D. Roosevelt and other public figures.

== Descent into madness ==
Irwin was considered "brilliant if erratic and at times violent." He tried to emasculate himself, using a razor. He then consented to be committed to a state mental hospital, where he initially stayed for a year. After his discharge, he moved into a New York City rooming house owned by Mary Gedeon. There, Irwin had become infatuated with her daughter Ethel, but his love for her was not returned. He received further treatment for mental illness for two more years at Rockland State Hospital in Orangeburg, New York, and was released in the summer of 1936. By then, Ethel Gedeon had married Joseph Kudner. Irwin then made a sculpture of Ethel with a cobra coiled around her neck.

He enrolled as a student at the Theological School of St. Lawrence University at Canton, New York. However, he was expelled on March 18, 1937, ten days before Easter, for "instability." He then rented (for a single day) a $2.50 ($44.11 in 2018)-a-week room in a house on 52nd Street in New York City, several blocks from Mary Gedeon's rooming house at 316 E. 50th Street. After considering and rejecting the idea of drowning himself in the East River, he instead walked to the Gedeon rooming house.

== Easter Weekend murders ==
On March 28, 1937 (Easter Sunday), relatives arriving at the Gedeons' flat for dinner discovered the partially clothed bodies of Mary Gedeon and her younger daughter Veronica, in Veronica's bedroom. Mrs. Gedeon and Veronica had been strangled, and Mrs. Gedeon had been stabbed as well. In a nearby room was the body of Frank Byrnes, a deaf English waiter, who had been stabbed many times.

The ensuing police investigation revealed that shortly after 2 a.m., Charles Robinson, an upstairs neighbor, had noticed that the door to the Gedeons' flat had been partially open and so closed it. Around 3 a.m., Veronica returned intoxicated from a date. Detectives concluded the assailant had entered the apartment before Veronica arrived and then had waited for her. They also concluded Byrnes had likely been killed while he slept.

Police suspicion focused initially on a driver and then turned to Mary Gedeon's ex-husband, Joseph Gedeon. By April 5, however, their attention had shifted toward Irwin, in part because a sculpture carefully carved in ordinary bath soap was discovered at the crime scene. A nationwide manhunt for Irwin followed. Ethel Gedeon and Irwin's psychiatrist expressed doubt that Irwin was capable of committing the murders, but State Inspector John Lyons said, "It makes no difference whether he committed three hundred murders, so far as the State is concerned. His psychopathic background shows he is insane."

== Hunt for Irwin and surrender ==
In late June 1937, a pantry maid in Cleveland's Statler Hotel saw a picture of Irwin in a pulp magazine and noticed a resemblance to a bar boy, who been working at the hotel for less than two months, under the name of Bob Murray. He cleaned out his locker and disappeared soon after she asked him about his last name and whether he knew about Robert Irwin. Once again, the search for Irwin became the lead story on the front pages of daily newspapers nationwide.

The next day, the Chicago Tribune received a call from someone claiming to be Irwin and offering to surrender for a price, but the Tribune dismissed the call as a prank. The Chicago Herald-Examiner, however, received a similar call but took it seriously. It made an arrangement under which Irwin would be paid $5,000 for an exclusive story and then surrender. After Irwin came to the newspaper's offices, its city editor, John W. Dienhart, and the reporters G. Duncan Bauman and Austin O'Malley kept Irwin in a room in the Morrison Hotel in Chicago, worked on the terms of a confession to the Beekman Hill murders the newspaper would publish as an exclusive, and briefly shielded him from police. The Hearst companies then flew him to New York City, where he was turned over to police. At that point, the famous New York criminal defense attorney Samuel Leibowitz, who had represented the Scottsboro Boys in Alabama and was reported to have saved 123 murder defendants from the death penalty, appeared as Irwin's attorney.

In his published confession, Irwin he stated he originally intended to kill Ethel Gedeon Kudner because "she was the dearest object in the world" to him, but he "accidentally" killed the others instead. He explained he went to the Gedeons' flat, expecting to find Ethel. He first struck then strangled Mary Gedeon, after she had asked him to leave. After her daughter Veronica arrived, he terrorized her but strangled her only after she called him by name, which showed that she recognized him. Afraid to leave alive a possible witness but unaware of Byrnes's deafness, Irwin entered Byrnes' room and stabbed him to death in his bed. In his confession to New York detectives, Irwin compared himself to a radio by explaining:

Bob Irwin is nothing. I am only a receiving set. An extremely imperfect one, which can indistinctly tune in the divine mind. You have heard a radio that isn't working well. You turn the dials and get a squawking. Only once in a while can we get the pure clear music. My whole idea in life was to perfect myself so 'the receiving set' could always get the divine music at its best.

== Prosecution, plea, and sentencing ==
Hours after New York police took Irwin into custody, he was indicted for three counts of first-degree murder. Contrary to Inspector Lyon's initial view Irwin was insane, New York now found him normal at the time of the murders and claimed that he knew the nature and quality of his acts. The office of District Attorney William C. Dodge also announced it would seek the death penalty. The presiding judge postponed the trial in September 1937 to await the findings of a three-member commission of inquiry evaluating Irwin's sanity. However, the commissioners concluded Irwin was sane. New York District Attorney Thomas E. Dewey, who had defeated Dodge, resumed the prosecution. As Irwin's trial date approached in the fall of 1938, William A. Adams, the warden of The Tombs detention center), said, "Irwin certainly isn't crazy now. He's as normal as any man in prison." Liebowitz, however, replied Irwin "was, is and will be hopelessly insane. He's crazy as a bedbug."

Publicity again peaked as the trial date approached; one news account reported that "not since the Harry K. Thaw murder trial had a case excited wider interest." Soon after a jury was selected, however, Irwin pleaded guilty to three counts of second-degree murder in exchange for avoiding the death penalty, and a promise that a pair of trousers that he had abandoned in a suitcase left at Grand Central Station in 1937 would be returned to him.

Judge James Wallace sentenced him to 139-years-to-life in prison (99 years-to-life for the slaying of Byrnes, 20 years-to-life for the slaying of Mary Gedeon, and 20 years-to-life for the slaying of Veronica Gedeon). He was then sent to Sing Sing Prison for a psychological evaluation, where prison doctors ruled him "very definitely insane." On December 10, 1938, he arrived at Dannemora State Hospital.

== Death and legacy ==
Irwin died of cancer in 1975 in Matteawan State Hospital for the Criminally Insane in Fishkill, New York.

Irwin's enduring legacy involves the way that newspapers exploited his crime by sensationalist headlines and racy photos, culminating with a paid confession that nearly put him in the electric chair. In the immediate aftermath of the crime, the New York Daily News publisher, Joseph Medill Patterson, responded to criticism of the sensationalism by editorializing that "murder sells papers, books, plays because we are all fascinated by murder." He defended the News' choice to give the story greater attention than President Roosevelt's failed attempt to "pack" the U.S. Supreme Court by explaining that "perhaps people should be more interested today in the Supreme Court than in the Gedeon murder, but we don't think they are."

The case also focused attention on New York's systematic exclusion of women from juries in first-degree murder cases. On the eve of the initial trial date in September 1937, the process for selection of jurors for Irwin's trial began with the announcement by the Acting Commissioner of Jurors none of the 841 names of potential jurors in the drum was a woman, despite the enactment of a statute expressly allowing women to serve as jurors. One day later, the court began to put women on jury lists in such cases.

The American novelist Thomas Berger reportedly used the Irwin case for his 1967 novel Killing Time.
