= Detroit Symphony Orchestra =

American orchestra

Detroit Symphony Orchestra (DSO)
- Orchestra
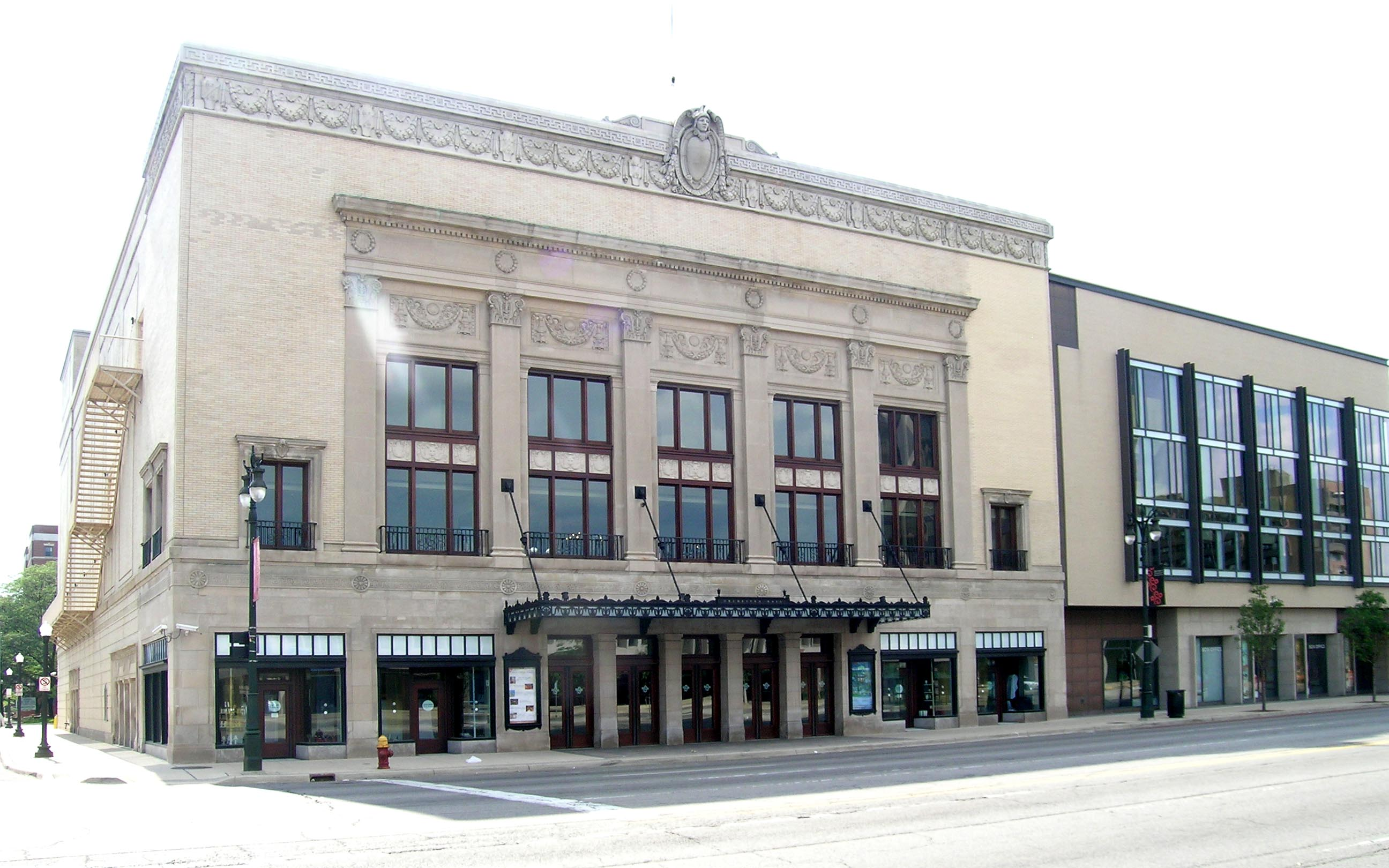
- Orchestra Hall at the Max M. Fisher Music Center
- Founded: 1887
- Concert hall: Orchestra Hall at the Max M. Fisher Music Center
- Principal conductor: Jader Bignamini
- Website: www.dso.org

The Detroit Symphony Orchestra (DSO) is an American orchestra based in Detroit, Michigan. Its primary performance venue is Orchestra Hall at the Max M. Fisher Music Center in Detroit's Midtown neighborhood. Jader Bignamini is the current music director of the Detroit Symphony Orchestra, with Enrico Lopez-Yañez as Principal Pops Conductor, Tabita Berglund as principal guest conductor and Na'Zir McFadden as assistant conductor. Leonard Slatkin, the previous music director, is the orchestra's current music director laureate. Neeme Järvi, music director from 1990 to 2005, is the orchestra's current music director emeritus.

== History ==
=== Founding and growth ===
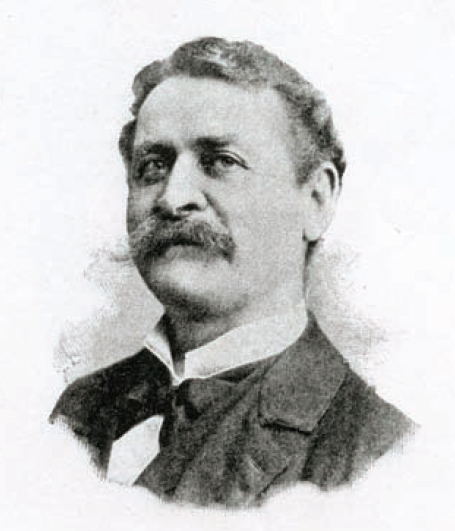
Fritz Kalsow (1847–1930), manager of DSO in 1887–1910

The DSO performed the first concert of its first subscription season at 8:00 p.m. on Monday, December 19, 1887, at the Detroit Opera House. The conductor was Rudolph Speil. He was succeeded in subsequent seasons by a variety of conductors until 1900 when Hugo Kalsow was appointed and served until the orchestra ceased operations in 1910. The Detroit Symphony resumed operations in 1914 when ten Detroit society women each contributed $100 to the organization and pledged to find 100 additional subscribers. They soon hired a music director, Weston Gales, a 27-year-old church organist from Boston, who led the first performance of the reconstituted orchestra on February 26, 1914, again at the old Detroit Opera House.

The appointment of the Russian pianist Ossip Gabrilowitsch as music director in 1918 brought instant status to the new orchestra. A friend of composers Gustav Mahler and Sergei Rachmaninoff, Gabrilowitsch demanded that a new auditorium be built as a condition of his accepting the position. Orchestra Hall was constructed in 1919 in four months and twenty-three days. In 1922, the orchestra gave the world's first radio broadcast of a symphony orchestra concert with Gabrilowitsch conducting and guest artist Artur Schnabel at the piano. Gabrilowitsch was music director until his death in 1936. From 1934 to 1942, the orchestra performed for millions across the country as the official orchestra of The Ford Sunday Evening Hour (later the Ford Symphony Hour) national radio show.

In 1939, three years after Gabrilowitsch's death, the orchestra moved from Orchestra Hall to the Masonic Temple Theatre due to major financial problems caused by the Great Depression. In the 1940s, the orchestra disbanded twice and moved to three different performing venues. In 1946, the orchestra moved to the Wilson Theater which was renamed Music Hall. In 1956, the orchestra moved to Ford Auditorium on the waterfront of the Detroit River, where it remained for the next 33 years. The orchestra once again enjoyed national prestige under music director Paul Paray, winning numerous awards for its 70 recordings on the Mercury label. Paray was followed by noted music directors Sixten Ehrling, Aldo Ceccato, Antal Doráti, and Günther Herbig.

In popular music, members of the orchestra provided the recorded string accompaniments on many of Motown Records's classic hits of the 1960s, usually under the direction of the orchestra's concertmaster of the time, Gordon Staples. Two Motown albums featured the strings with the Motown rhythm section the Funk Brothers. The combined ensemble was known as the San Remo Golden Strings and enjoyed two hit singles: "Hungry for Love" (#3 Billboard Adult Contemporary) and "I'm Satisfied" (#89 U.S. Pop). In 1966, members of the orchestra were seen recording in the Motown studio on West Grand Boulevard with The Supremes for the ABC TV documentary "Anatomy of Pop: The Music Explosion". The song they perform is the hit "My World Is Empty Without You" by Holland, Dozier, and Holland. There were two full albums released by the group: "Hungry for Love" (1967) and "Swing" (1968) both on the Gordy label (a subsidiary of Motown).

In 1970, the DSO instituted the Detroit Symphony Youth Orchestra as a training group, under Paul Freeman.

=== The Neeme Järvi era ===
In 1989, following a 20-year rescue and restoration effort, the Detroit Symphony Orchestra returned to Orchestra Hall. Further renovations to the hall were completed in 2003, including a $60 million addition and a recital hall and education wing, the Max M. Fisher Music Center designed by Diamond Schmittin association with Gunn Levine Architects . A fine arts high school, the Detroit School of Arts, was added to the DSO campus in 2004.

Neeme Järvi began his music directorship in 1990, and served through 2005, the second-longest in the orchestra's history. Järvi now has the title of music director emeritus with the orchestra. Following Järvi's departure, the DSO named Peter Oundjian as its principal guest conductor and artistic advisor for a 2-year period, from 2006 to 2008.

=== Leonard Slatkin ===
After a five-year search, the DSO announced on October 7, 2007, the appointment of Leonard Slatkin as its twelfth music director. In February 2010, the orchestra announced the extension of Slatkin's contract as DSO music director through the 2012–2013 season. Slatkin took a salary reduction to help relieve the orchestra's financial difficulties. In December 2014, the DSO announced an extension of Slatkin's contract as music director through the 2017–2018 season. With the 2018–2019 season, Slatkin took the title of music director laureate, the first former DSO music director to be granted that title.

=== 2010–2011 DSO musicians strike and aftermath ===
A labor dispute prompted DSO musicians to strike on October 4, 2010. On February 19, 2011, after the musicians rejected a final offer made on February 15, 2011, DSO management announced it would suspend the remainder of the 2010–2011 concert season. Following a six-month strike, the musicians and management reached an agreement on April 3, 2011. Concerts resumed April 9, 2011, with a weekend of free concerts. The DSO's first weekend back, tickets for all concerts were priced at $20. The DSO instituted similar "patron-minded pricing" for the 2011–12 season with most seats to all classical concerts priced at $15 or $25.

On the anniversary of the strike a member of the musicians' negotiating committee, violinist Marian Tanau, spoke to the World Socialist Web Site about the new conditions. He remarked on the loss of significant members of the orchestra and the prevalence of substitute musicians, leading to a slight decline in quality. Tanau claimed that the 30% wage cut and loss of prestige meant that the DSO could no longer attract the "best of the best".

Since the DSO returned to the stage in April 2011, the orchestra reorganised its activities under the umbrella term of 'OneDSO', with new work in such areas as community engagement and digital accessibility. The Neighborhood Series attracted new subscribers for the orchestra in venues around metro Detroit, helping to increase total subscription growth of nearly 25% from 2011 to 2014.

=== Recent history ===
In 2013, the DSO returned to Carnegie Hall for the first time in 17 years to perform in the Spring for Music Festival. In January 2014, the DSO announced that its board, musicians, and management agreed to a new three-year contract eight months before the current one expired.

In June 2018, Jader Bignamini first guest-conducted the DSO as an emergency substitute for Slatkin. Bignamini returned in October 2019 for a further guest-conducting engagement with the orchestra. Then, in January 2020, the DSO announced the appointment of Bignamini as its next music director, effective in the 2020–2021 season, with an initial contract of 6 seasons. In December 2023, the orchestra announced the extension of Bignamini's contract as music director through to the 2030–2031 season, at the same time announcing its plan to record Wynton Marsalis' Blues Symphony. The album came out in March 2025.

In October 2023, the DSO announced the appointment of Enrico Lopez-Yañez to succeed Jeff Tyzik as Principal Pops Conductor. Tyzik had served as the DSO’s Principal Pops Conductor since 2013.

In January 2023, Tabita Berglund first guest-conducted the orchestra. In February 2024, the DSO announced the appointment of Berglund as its next principal guest conductor, effective with the 2024–2025 season, with an initial contract of four seasons. Berglund is the first female conductor to be named to this post with the Detroit Symphony Orchestra.

Anne Parsons was the orchestra's president and chief executive officer from 2004 until her death in March 2022. In December 2021, the orchestra announced the appointment of Erik Rӧnmark as its next president and chief executive officer, effective March 2022.

=== Media activities ===
On April 10, 2011, the DSO launched 'Live from Orchestra Hall', the first free webcast series by an orchestra. During classical weekends, DSO concerts are streamed live to a worldwide audience. On October 9, 2010, the DSO expanded the series to mobile devices through the DSO to Go mobile app for iOS and Android devices. More than 550,000 viewers in over 100 countries have watched 'Live from Orchestra Hall' since its inception. On October 7, 2012, the DSO webcast its first Pops concert, 'Cirque de la Symphonie', which was also projected onto the building for the general public for the orchestra's first ever, larger-than-life "MaxCast".

The symphony has produced many recordings on the Victor, London, Decca, Mercury, RCA, Chandos, PENTATONE and DSO labels. The DSO recording of Igor Stravinsky's The Rite of Spring was the first CD to win the Grand Prix du Disque award. The DSO has recently recorded for the Naxos label, including music of Rachmaninoff, Aaron Copland, and John Williams. In early 2010, George Blood Audio and Video [of Philadelphia] began transferring recordings, dating back to the 1959–1960 concert season, to the digital medium.

== Music directors ==
- Weston Gales (1914–1917)
- Ossip Gabrilowitsch (1918–1936)
- Franco Ghione (1936–1940)
- Victor Kolar (1940–1942)
- Karl Krueger (1944–1949)
- Paul Paray (1951–1962)
- Sixten Ehrling (1963–1973)
- Aldo Ceccato (1973–1977)
- Antal Doráti (1977–1981)
- Günther Herbig (1984–1990)
- Neeme Järvi (1990–2005)
- Leonard Slatkin (2008–2018)
- Jader Bignamini (2020–present)

== See also ==
- Orchestra Hall, Detroit
- Alexander Mishnaevski (the orchestra's principal violist emeritus)
- Robert deMaine (the orchestra's former principal cellist)
- Robert S. Williams (the orchestra's principal bassoonist)

== Sources ==
- Gavrilovich, Peter and Bill McGraw. The Detroit Almanac, Detroit Free Press (2000, ISBN 978-0-937247-34-1).
- Heiles, Ann Mischakoff, America's Concertmasters (Detroit Monographs in Musicology). Harmonie Park (2007, ISBN 978-0-89990-139-8).
- Woodford, Arthur M., This is Detroit 1701–2001. Wayne State University Press (2001, ISBN 978-0-8143-2914-6).
