= Hiroko Nakamura =

Japanese pianist (1944–2016)

Hiroko Nakamura 中村 紘子
- Born: Hiroko Fukuda; July 25, 1944; Yamanashi, Japan
- Died: July 26, 2016 (aged 72) Tokyo, Japan
- Instrument: Piano

Hiroko Nakamura (中村 紘子, Nakamura Hiroko; July 25, 1944 – July 26, 2016) was a Japanese pianist.

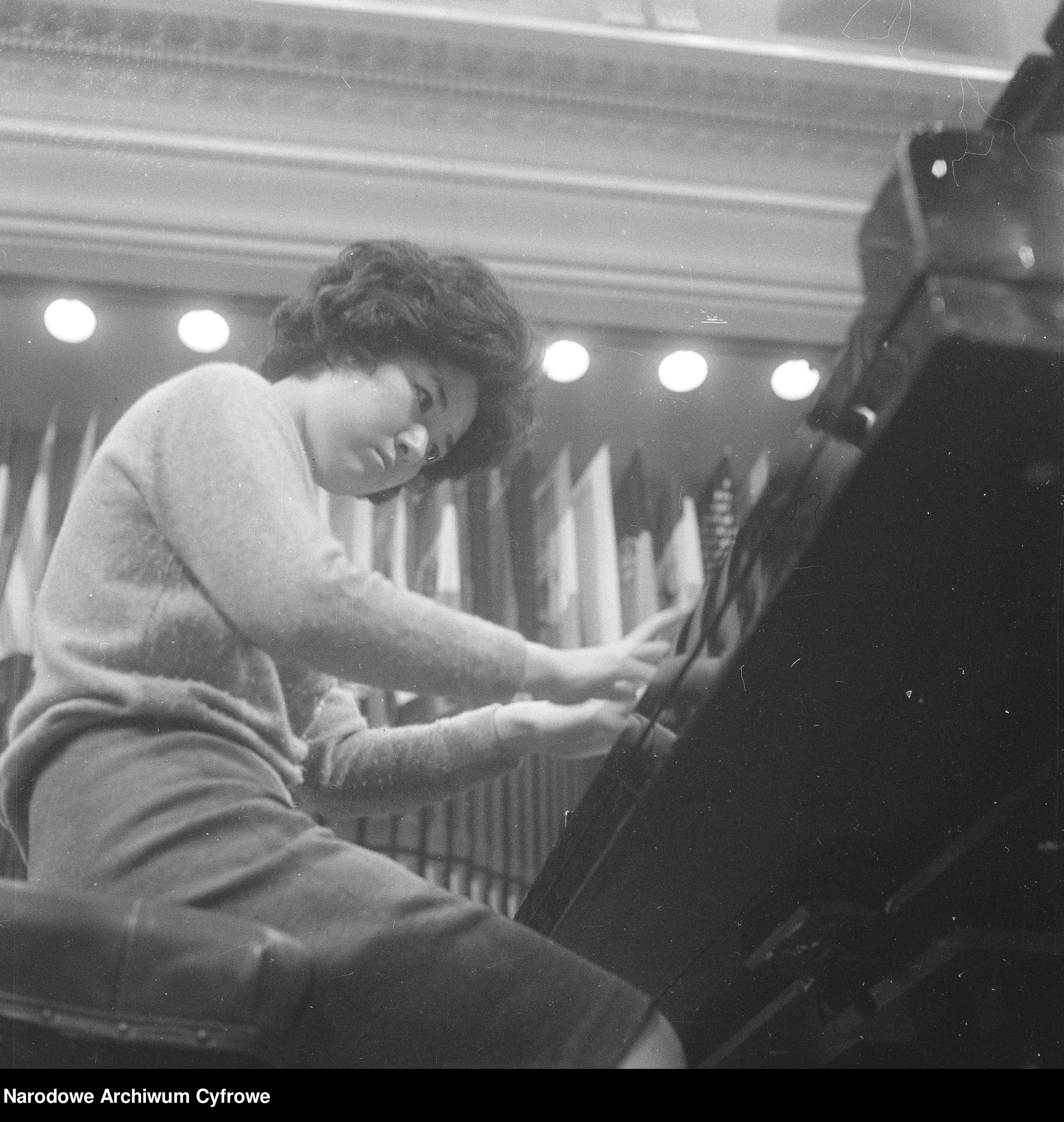
Nakamura in 1965

== Early life ==
Born Hiroko Fukuda in Yamanashi, she grew up in Tokyo. She began to study piano at the age of 3 at Toho Gakuen School of Music under Aiko Iguchi. In 1959, whilst a student at Chutobu Junior High School, she won first prize at the National Music Competition of Japan at age 15. In 1963, she began piano studies at the Juilliard School of Music, and studied under Rosina Lhévinne. In 1965, at the VII International Chopin Piano Competition, she won 4th prize, the youngest prizewinner that year, and was the second Japanese prizewinner in the history of the Chopin Competition.

== Career ==
Nakamura was a juror at many major piano competitions, including the Chopin in Poland, the Tchaikovsky in Russia, the Paloma O'Shea Santander International Piano Competition (1987), the Arthur Rubinstein in Israel, the Busoni in Italy and so on. She also served as the chairperson of the jury of the Hamamatsu International Piano Competition and as the Music Director of the Hamamatsu International Piano Academy. She received the 2005 ExxonMobil Music Award. She was also a nonfiction writer, critic and television personality. She wrote four books. Her first book, The Tchaikovsky Competition (チャイコフスキーコンクール, Chaikofusukii Konkūru), written about her experiences on the juries at the 1982 and 1986 Tchaikovsky Competitions in Moscow, won the 20th Ohya Non-Fiction Prize in 1989. Another of her books was Pianisuto to Iu Banzoku ga Iru (ピアニストという蛮族がいる; approximately translated 'The Savages Called Pianists').

== Personal life ==
Nakamura lived in Mita, Tokyo with her husband Kaoru Shōji, one of the winners of Akutagawa Prize. Shōji had mentioned Nakamura by name in his novel Akazukin-chan Ki wo Tsukete. The two subsequently met in person and married.

=== Cancer diagnosis and death ===
She was diagnosed with colorectal cancer in 2014, and suspended her performances for treatment. She briefly performed again in the spring of 2016, and her final performance was on 8 May 2016 in Sumoto, Kumamoto Prefecture. She died on July 26, 2016 in Tokyo and was survived by her husband.
