= Julia Nussenbaum =

American violinist and murder victim (1913–1937)

- Also known as: Tania Lubova; Tania Leelova
- Origin: New York City
- Died: April 18, 1937 (aged 25) Manhattan, New York, USA
- Cause of death: Murdered
- Occupation: Musician
- Instrument: Violin
- Formerly of: Tania and Maria

Julia Nussenbaum (1913 – April 18, 1937) was an American violinist who studied at the Juilliard School in New York. She initially performed professionally as a classical musician, but was persuaded to move to night club playing by Mischa Rosenbaum. She then performed under the name of Tania Lubova and/or Tania Lee Lova. She was murdered by Rosenbaum, 31, who had become her manager/ director in a West 43rd Street, Manhattan rehearsal studio, in 1937.

Rosenbaum hid her unconscious body behind a soundproof curtain, where she was found some hours later by Moya Engels, a dancer. She was taken to hospital, where she died six hours after admittance.

Nussenbaum's Aunt, Mae Stock Rich, later told the papers that Nussenbaum had been threatened by Rosenbaum on numerous occasions, and that her father had been to see him and warned him to desist. However, Rosenbaum was still annoying her, hence her reluctance to meet with him on the fatal day.

Although initially charged with first degree murder, Rosenbaum pleaded guilty to second degree murder on June 7, 1937. Judge Saul S. Streit accepted the plea on the recommendation of New York City District Attorney William C. Dodge.

Attorney Samuel Leibowitz was employed by Rosenbaum's brother, Zachary, had already stated that he planned to use the 'homewrecker' defence that had proved successful in earlier cases, although Nussenbaum's family was adamant that she had not known that Rosenbaum was married. In agreeing to the plea, Dodge believed it wise to uphold the reputation of Nussenbaum and to forgo the $800 daily expense New York would save by not having an extended trial.

Rosenbaum said that he regretted killing Nussenbaum. He intended to become supervisor of prison theatrical productions after his June 21, 1937. sentencing. He was sentenced to 35 years to life. Judge Streit stated "I can't see why he brought that hammer there, or why he struck her from eight to twelve blows with it.I think there is sufficient evidence here for a jury to have found him guilty of murder in the first degree."
