= Vermont Mozart Festival =

American annual live music events

- Founded: 1974 (first concert); Incorporated: December 3, 1976
- Founder: Melvin Kaplan
- Purpose: Live music
- Location: South Burlington, Vermont, USA
- Method: Summer Festival, Winter Series

The Vermont Mozart Festival was an annual series of indoor and outdoor concert venues throughout the state of Vermont. First held in 1974, the festival primarily focused on the works of Wolfgang Amadeus Mozart. The last event was the December 2010 winter concert.

== History ==
The Festival was founded in 1974 by Melvin Kaplan, oboist and teacher at Juilliard, in collaboration with conductor William Metcalfe and the University of Vermont. The first season featured all-Mozart performances at the UVM Show Barn, Shelburne Farms, Royall Tyler Theatre, Robert Hull Fleming Museum, St. Paul's Cathedral, and aboard the S.S. Champlain. The Shelburne Farms concert marked the first time that the site was opened for a public event. In all, ten concerts were held over two weeks. The following season, the Festival's format was expanded to include 15 concerts and three workshops. This format remained mostly unchanged for the rest of the Festival for 35 years. The Festival performed more than 3,000 pieces in over 50 locations, including at least 278 of Mozart's 626 works.

The Festival was incorporated as a non-profit organization in late 1976; the first full board of directors was assembled in early 1977. Following a successful fundraising campaign, the Festival achieved national recognition when CBS Sunday Morning filmed a week of concerts on location. A series of winter concerts began in 1978. In 1983, the complete Winter Series was recorded by National Public Radio and aired on Performance Today. In 1984, the Festival presented its first concert on the meadow of the Trapp Family Lodge in Stowe, Vermont, which quickly became, along with Shelburne Farms, one of the Festival's two largest and most popular concert sites. In the 2000s, all concerts on the Trapp meadow were followed by fireworks displays.

=== Traditions ===
- The Grand Opening Concert of the Summer Festival was preceded by a classical dressage exhibition.
- The Summer Festival concluded with Mozart's Ave verum Corpus.

=== Financial sustainability ===
In early 2005, the new executive director announced that the Festival was about $140,000 in debt—enough to put the Festival's continued existence in jeopardy. Supporters responded; and in two seasons, 65% of that debt was eliminated. The same executive director then resigned citing differences with the Festival's board of directors. Over the following four seasons, the deficit climbed to almost a third of the million dollar annual budget. The festival closed its doors following the December 2010 winter concert.

== Notable performers ==
Over the years, the Festival featured various performers including both established musicians and up-and-coming talent.

Soloists (partial list)
- Julius Baker, flute
- Charles Bressler, tenor
- Daniel Epstein (pianist), piano
- Eliot Fisk, guitar
- Claude Frank, piano
- Marc-André Hamelin, piano
- Sharon Isbin, guitar
- Louis Lortie, piano
- Robert Mann, violin
- Harvey Phillips, tuba
- Menahem Pressler, piano
- Mike Seeger, folk artist
- Walter Trampler, viola

Orchestras

- Orchestre Symphonique de Québec
- Montreal Symphony Orchestra

Conductors

- Alexander Brott

Ensembles

- Beaux Arts Trio
- Borodin Quartet
- Emerson Quartet
- Guarneri Quartet
- Salomon Quartet
- Ying Quartet

== In the media ==
- “Melvin Kaplan, the oboist who is the Festival’s artistic director, has pieced together a remarkably attractive season that in its resourcefulness, sophistication, and occasional downright giddiness puts many of our better-established festivals to shame.” – Henahan, Donal. New York Times (1978)
- “One has all the ingredients necessary for a splendid musical vacation. For those with… a love of gorgeous sites and sounds, the Vermont Mozart Festival is a definite must.” – Montreal Star (July 1979)
- “The Vermont Mozart Festival brings the music of Mozart to life.” – CBS Sunday Morning (August 1991)
- “Mozart under the lights at Lincoln Center is an enchanting musical experience. Mozart under the stars at Shelburne Farms… is something else again. This is a perennial favorite.” – New York Times (1992)
- “On the score of settings, it’s difficult to beat the Vermont Mozart Festival.” – Boston Globe (1993)

== See also ==
- Vermont Symphony Orchestra
