= Leviticus Lyon =

American musician (1894–1958)

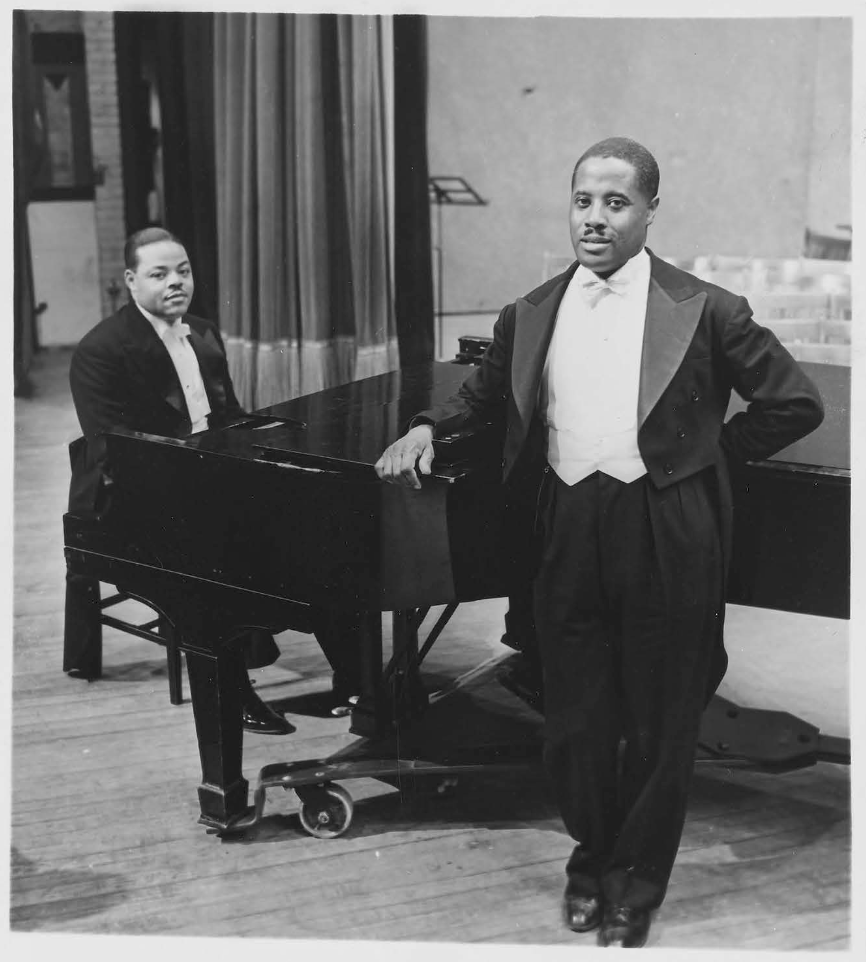
- Leviticus Lyon (c. 1925), standing next to the piano
- Born: Leviticus Nelson Everell Lyon; May 29, 1894; San Francisco, California, U.S.
- Died: 1958 (aged 63–64); New York, U.S.
- Other names: Leviticus N. E. Lyon
- Occupation(s): Tenor vocalist, stage director

Leviticus Nelson Everell Lyon (1894–1958) was an American tenor vocalist, and stage director in New York City.

== Life and career ==
Leviticus Nelson Everell Lyon was born on May 29, 1894, in San Francisco, California, and raised in Oakland. His parents were Giraldo Gomez Lyon from Guinea-Bissau, West Africa; and Elizabeth Garland Lyon from Saint Kitts and Nevis, West Indies; he was Black. As a child he performed at Old St. Peter's Episcopal Church in San Francisco. Leviticus held many jobs as a teenager, including as a janitor assistant, and as an elevator operator at the United States Customs Service in San Francisco.

In 1925–1926, Lyon was awarded a fellowship at Juilliard School in New York City. In the 1930s he performed with The Harlem Sinfonietta. He was able to sing in Italian, German, French, and English.

In his late life he worked as stage director in Westchester County, New York.

The Lyon, Leviticus, 1894–1958 papers can be found at the Archives at Yale, Yale University.
