= Melvin Kaplan =

American musician (1929–2022)

Melvin Kaplan (August 29, 1929 – September 25, 2022) was an American oboist, concert manager, and formerly a teacher at the Juilliard School for 25 years. He was for many years a featured performer and lecturer at the Metropolitan Museum of Art. Kaplan is a founding member of both the New York Chamber Soloists and the Festival Winds, though he is perhaps best known as Artistic Director of the original Vermont Mozart Festival, which he cofounded in 1974 with William Metcalfe, a conductor and professor at the University of Vermont. He received the Governor's Award for Extraordinary Contribution to Vermont in 1990 and a Lifetime Achievement Award from the Vermont Arts Council in 1998.
