= Alexander Mishnaevski =

Russian violist

Alexander Mishnaevski is a Russian violist.

== Early life ==
Born in Moscow, Mishnaevski began studying the violin at age six at the renowned Central Music School of Moscow Tchaikovski Conservatory. Mishnaevski emigrated to the United States in 1973 where he lived in New York City and graduated from Juilliard School of Music while studying with the legendary Dorothy Delay. At Juilliard, Mishnaevski changed from violin to viola at the suggestion of Isaac Stern.

== Emigration ==
Mishnaevski became an American citizen in 1983 and joined the Detroit Symphony Orchestra as principal violist in 1986. Prior to joining the DSO, Mishnaevski held the position of principal violist at the New York Chamber Orchestra, the New York Pro Arte Ensemble, Montreal's McGill Chamber Orchestra and Orquestra Sinfonica de Xalapa in Mexico.

== Playing career ==
=== Collaboration ===
Mishnaevski's international performance experience of chamber music concerts and recitals have allowed him to collaborate on projects with eminent players including Isaac Stern, Schlomo Mintz, Joseph Silverstein, Schmuel Ashkenazy, Franz Helmerson, Joseph Swenson and the Colorado Quartet. As a soloist, Mishnaevski has appeared with the DSO, New York City Symphony, the Oklahoma Symphony, Queens Symphony Orchestra (New York), the New Jersey State Symphony, Orquestra Sinfonica de Xalapa, the Taipei Symphony and the Singapore Symphony. He has also performed in Korea and Hong Kong.

=== Current works ===
Locally, he runs a private studio and also performs with symphony orchestras in Windsor, Southfield, Grosse Pointe and Dearborn. Mishnaevski has taught master classes and workshops in the U.S., Canada, Singapore, Taiwan, Korea, Hong, Kong, and Mexico.
