= Genia Melikova =

Evgenia "Genia" Melikova (January 6, 1924 – March 5, 2004) was a well-known ballet dancer in Europe in the 1950s and 60s who then established a long and prestigious teaching career in the United States.

Melikova was born in Marseilles, France, to Russian parents. She began her ballet training in Nice with Julia Sedova. At an early age, she joined the Ballet Russe de Monte Carlo under the direction of Leonide Massine. Following World War II, Melikova emigrated to the United States with her parents, where she continued her studies under the direction of Anatole Vilzak, Lubov Egorova, Igor Schwezoff and Antony Tudor. She performed briefly with American Ballet Theatre before joining the Paris-based Grand Ballet du Marquis de Cuevas company (1954–1962), the first European troupe to feature ballets by American choreographers and American dancers. Her roles included Aurora and the Lilac Fairy in The Sleeping Beauty and Odette-Odile in Swan Lake.

Ms. Melikova was the first Western ballerina to perform with Rudolf Nureyev after his defection to the West in 1961. They danced together numerous times - The Sleeping Beauty and the Black Swan Pas de deux - in France, Italy, and Israel (Ballet Today April 1964). She also danced with the Grand Ballet Classique de France and the London Festival Ballet (1963–64) before moving to New York where she performed at Radio City Music Hall and on Broadway.

In 1969, the ballet choreographer Antony Tudor suggested Ms. Melikova join the dance faculty at The Juilliard School. She was a gifted teacher and taught there for 26 years where she choreographed and directed Vivaldiana (March 1985) and restaged the Pas de trois from George Balanchine's Paquita. She also taught at the Igor Youskevitch School of Ballet and the Alvin Ailey American Dance Center, directed the Bridgeport Ballet Company in Connecticut and was a guest instructor at Randolph-Macon Woman's College.

Genia Melikova died on March 5, 2004, at the age of 80 in New York City.
