= Wanda L. Bass =

US philanthropist and banker

Wanda L. Bass (January 5, 1927 – February 12, 2008) was an American philanthropist and banker. Bass donated most of the $38.5 million for the Wanda L. Bass School of Music at Oklahoma City University. In addition, she gave a separate $2.1 million gift to purchase 105 Steinway pianos. Bass was noted for her donations of time and money to the McAlester Public Schools and numerous other causes in Oklahoma.

== Early life ==
Bass was born Wanda Louise Jones on January 5, 1927, in Ewing, Texas, a small mill town near Lufkin, to Ina Pearl Laird Jones and Talmadge Jones. She attended the University of Texas at Austin and graduated with a bachelor's degree in nutrition with a minor in management. She worked for Humble Oil Company as a dietician and later worked for Lone Star Gas Company.

She married Clark Bass, a banker, on November 25, 1951, in DeQueen, Arkansas. The newly married couple moved to Durant, Oklahoma, where he was president of a local bank. Clark organized the Inwood National Bank in Dallas, Texas, in 1961. In 1963, Clark became president of the First National Bank and Trust of McAlester in McAlester, and the family moved to McAlester in 1966.

The couple had three children: Louise, Boyd, and Carlton. After Clark Bass died in 1999, Wanda succeeded him as chairman of the board of the bank. Wanda died on February 12, 2008.

== Philanthropy ==
Bass donated millions of dollars and thousands of hours to Oklahoma economic development, arts, and education. In 1998, Bass helped establish the McAlester campus of Eastern Oklahoma State College, and the higher education center on the campus is named after her.

When Louise Bass enrolled at Oklahoma City University as a music student, Wanda became involved in raising money and donating time to the university. In 2006, the 113,000 square feet (10,500 m^{2}) Wanda L. Bass Music Center opened at a cost of $38.5 million. In addition, Bass contracted with Steinway & Sons to purchase 105 grand pianos; at the time, it was the largest order in Steinway's history.
