= Rosina Lhévinne =

Russian-American pianist and pedagogue (1880–1976)

- Розина Левина
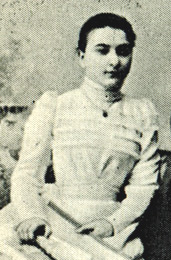
- Born: Rozina Yakovlevna Bessi; March 29, 1880; Kiev, Russian Empire
- Died: November 9, 1976 (aged 96)
- Occupation: Pianist

Rosina Yakovlevna Lhévinne or Levina (Russian: Розина Яковлевна Левина; née Bessie (Бесси); March 29, 1880 – November 9, 1976) was a Russian and American pianist and famed pedagogue.

== Early life, education and family ==
Rosina Bessie was the younger of two daughters of Maria (née Katz) and Jacques Bessie, a prosperous jeweller from a Dutch Jewish family who emigrated to the Russian Empire to ply his trade as a diamond merchant. There were violent anti-Semitic riots in Kiev during her first year, and the Bessies moved to Moscow in 1881 or 1882. The young Rosina began studying piano at the age of six with a teacher in Moscow, where the family had moved shortly after her birth. When her teacher became ill, a family friend suggested that she continue her studies with Josef Lhévinne, a talented student at the Moscow Imperial Conservatory, five years older than Rosina. She showed great talent and several years later was admitted to the Conservatory, where she also studied with Lhévinne's teacher, Vasily Safonov. At her graduation in 1898, she won the gold medal in piano as had Josef before her, and that year the two were married. They had two children, Constantine "Don" Lhevinne (1906–1998) and Marianna Lhevinne Graham (1918–2012).

== Music career ==
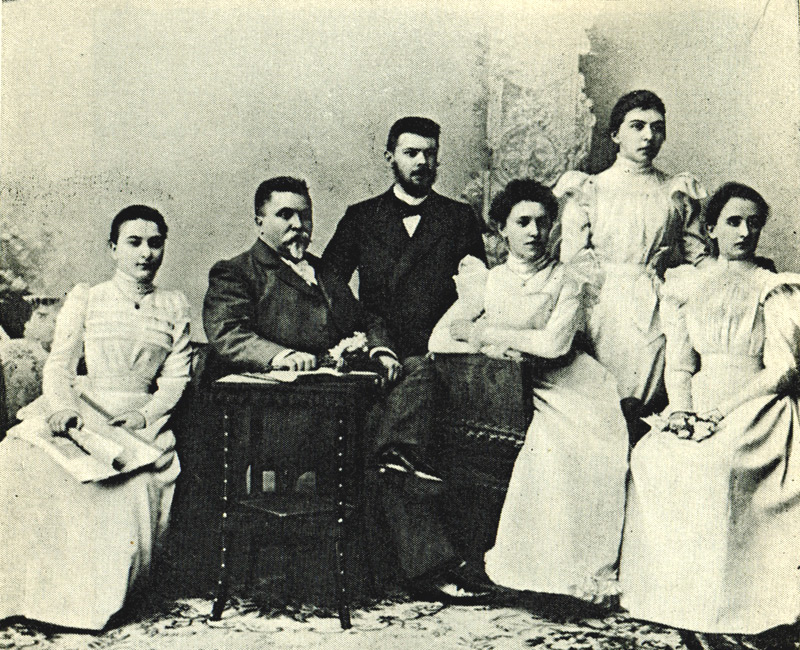
Vasily Safonov (1852—1918) with his pupils from Moscow Conservatory, on the left: Rosina Lhévinne

Rosina gave up her ambitions to be a solo performer to avoid clashing with her husband Josef's career as a concert pianist, a vow she kept until well after his death in 1944. Thus she confined her activities to teaching and performing on two pianos with her husband. Together they lived and taught in Moscow, Tbilisi, Georgia and later in Berlin before emigrating after World War I and the Russian Revolution to New York, where they joined the faculty of the Institute of Musical Art which later became The Juilliard School.

=== Teaching ===
Having acted essentially as a preparatory teacher to her more famous husband's students for 46 years, she felt reluctant after his death to assume his full duties at the school; however, Juilliard's administrators were unanimous in wanting her to continue in her husband's place.

Among her students were many of the best young pianists of the 1940s, 50s and 60s, including Van Cliburn, who arrived in her class in 1951. At the height of the Cold War in 1958, he was awarded the First Prize at the inaugural Tchaikovsky Competition in Moscow, becoming an instant worldwide celebrity and bringing international fame to his teacher. Other Lhévinne students include Martin Canin (her teaching assistant), James Levine (music director of the Metropolitan Opera), John Williams (composer and conductor of the Boston Pops Orchestra), the composer Judith Lang Zaimont, pianists John Browning, Walter Buczynski, Kun Woo Paik, Seth Carlin, Eduardo Delgado, Madeleine Forte, Edna Golandsky, Tong-Il Han, Anthony & Joseph Paratore, Daniel Pollack, Marcus Raskin, Misha Dichter, Edward Auer, Santos Ojeda, Joel Ryce-Menuhin, Garrick Ohlsson, Joseph William Fennimore, Hiroko Nakamura, Selma Epstein, Robelyn Schrade, Neal Larrabee, Jeffrey Biegel and many others including several present-day teachers at the Juilliard School.

=== Performance ===
In 1949 Mme. Lhévinne reconsidered her decision never to play in public as a soloist, and in her 70s and 80s she made a remarkable series of appearances, first in collaboration with the Juilliard String Quartet, and later in concertos at the Aspen Summer Music Festival. Her greatest moment as a soloist came in January 1963, aged 82, with her debut at the New York Philharmonic under conductor Leonard Bernstein playing Frédéric Chopin's Piano Concerto No. 1, a piece she had performed for her graduation from the Moscow Conservatory sixty-five years earlier. There are recordings of both the Chopin Concerto and Mozart's C major Concerto, K. 467.

== Death and legacy ==
Madame Lhévinne continued to teach at Juilliard and at the University of Southern California in Los Angeles, where she died in 1976 at age 96.

Just prior to her death, Robert K. Wallace published a book about the Lhévinnes entitled A Century of Music-Making: The Lives of Josef and Rosina Lhévinne, for which she was extensively interviewed.

In 2003, Madame Lhévinne's former student and assistant, Salome Ramras Arkatov, produced a documentary film, The Legacy of Rosina Lhévinne, which contains rare archival footage of Lhévinne's teaching and performing as well as interviews with a number of her former students.
