= Warren Ellsworth =

American operatic tenor (1950–1993)

- Born: 28 October 1950; Worcester, Massachusetts, U.S.
- Died: 25 February 1993 (aged 42); Houston, Texas, U.S.
- Education: Juilliard School
- Occupation: Operatic tenor
- Spouse: Caroline Ellsworth
- Children: 2 sons, 2 stepdaughters

Warren Aldrich Ellsworth III (28 October 1950 – 25 February 1993) was an American operatic tenor.

== Early life ==
Ellsworth was born in Worcester, Massachusetts, and studied at the Juilliard School in New York City. He initially studied to be a lyric baritone before retraining as a tenor.

== Career ==
He began his professional career in 1976 with the Texas Opera Theater and appeared frequently with the Houston Grand Opera. Ellsworth's first major European engagements came with the Welsh National Opera, where he sang Lieutenant Pinkerton in Madama Butterfly and later the title role in Parsifal under conductor Reginald Goodall. Ellsworth's repertoire included Siegmund in Die Walküre, Don José in Carmen, Samson in Samson et Dalila, Boris in Káťa Kabanová, and Jim Mahoney in The Rise and Fall of the City of Mahagonny. He performed with major companies including La Scala, the Royal Opera House, and the Deutsche Oper Berlin, where he was a resident for several seasons.

== Later life and death ==
Ellsworth continued to perform throughout the late 1980s and early 1990s, appearing in Geneva, Vienna, Paris, Seattle and Los Angeles. He died of lymphoma on 25 February 1993 in Houston, aged 42. He was survived by his wife, Caroline, two sons, and two stepdaughters.
