= Santos Ojeda =

Cuban-born American classical pianist and pedagogue

Santos Ojeda (January 18, 1917 – May 27, 2004) was a Cuban-born American classical pianist and pedagogue.

== Life and Studies ==
Ojeda was born in Caibarién in the province of Villa Clara, Cuba. He began studying piano at age 3 with his mother, Maria Luisa Valdes de Ojeda. His skills developed rapidly and he was discovered by conductor and composer Alejandro García Caturla, who accompanied a 15-year-old Ojeda for the premier in Cuba of Gershwin’s Rhapsody in Blue. At age 17 he moved to New York City to study with assistants to Josef Lhévinne and Rosina Lhévinne of The Juilliard School of Music, but was ultimately accepted directly, becoming the first ever foreign-born student admitted to Juilliard. Later he enlisted in the U.S. Army to serve in World War II. After the end of WW II, he stayed in Europe for a time and advanced his studies with Yves Nat of the Paris Conservatoire. With his return to New York City, he resumed his studies at Juilliard with Rosina Lhévinne, ultimately graduating with honors with a Bachelor’s degree in Piano Performance followed by a Master’s degree. Later he received the Professional Diploma from Columbia University.

== Performances ==
His New York City debut was October 20, 1952, at Town Hall, where he would perform several times. Ojeda frequently toured the major centers of Europe, North and South America, as well as presented concerts in his homeland of Cuba. During one visit to Cuba he performed the Cuban premier of the Rachmaninoff Piano Concerto No.2 in C-minor, with the Havana Philharmonic Orchestra under the direction of Amadeo Roldán. Ojeda's repertoire was wide, encompassing not only the Common practice period, but also including major works of the 20th century and of contemporary composers, including Latin American composers such as Ginastera. At his 4th Town Hall recital on December 20, 1969, he performed the New York City debut of Hugh Aitken’s Piano Fantasy (1966). He also performed at Lincoln Center (Alice Tully Hall).

== Pedagogy ==
Ojeda taught at the Juilliard School (1955–1967), Columbia University (1957–1967) and then was appointed Artist in Residence in 1967 at the College-Conservatory of Music at the University of Cincinnati, where he would achieve full Professorship and finally retire in 1987. He was known to be an imaginative and enlightening clinician and had a reputation for sometimes inscrutable similes which nonetheless accomplished their purposes. For example, he might direct a player to “scoop it like you’re scooping ice cream,” or “play it like a drop of ink in a glass of milk,” or “play this like a wounded queen.” He trained many students who are performers and professors today, as any simple web search will reveal. “Aside from his natural ability for the piano and his perfect pitch, he was someone interested in art in general, whether in literature such as poetry and storytelling, or in painting, [or] architecture. … [Mr. Ojeda] was an aristocrat of the spirit; a very private and complex man. He had a great sense of humor, yet was very refined both as a teacher and in personal relationships.”

== Final Years and Demise ==
In his final years Ojeda moved to Miami, Florida, to be close to family. He died at the age of 87 from complications of pneumonia at Hialeah Hospital.
