= Murder of Veronica Gedeon =

1937 crime in New York, United States

Veronica "Ronnie" Gedeon (/ˈɡɪdiən/; 1917 – March 28, 1937) was a 20-year-old commercial model from Long Island City who was murdered by American sculptor Robert George Irwin on Easter Sunday in 1937. Gedeon was strangled to death by Irwin, along with her mother, Mary, who was also stabbed to death; deaf English waiter Frank Byrnes was also stabbed multiple times by Irwin. This case was reported widely in newspapers in New York City. After Irwin was apprehended, there were substantial changes in the psychiatric laws in the state of New York.

The case was the subject of a 2015 episode of Investigation Discovery's series A Crime to Remember (Season 3, Episode 4, "Such A Pretty Face"). It was also featured in a 2017 episode of the Travel Channel's series Mysteries at the Museum (Season 17, Episode 2, "Antis the Radar Dog, Bringing Up the Baby and the Art of Murder").

== Lurid photographs ==
Gedeon appeared at an Illustrators Society show for models which was raided by members of the New York City Police Department on November 8, 1935. She posed for crime-oriented periodicals such as Inside Detective and Headquarters Detective. Her murder featured an ironic twist because of the sensational titles of the pictorials she appeared in. In Party Girl, Pretty But Cheap, and I Am A White Slave photographs showed her "flimsily clad", beaten, smothered, and tied up.

== Family history ==
Gedeon attended William Cullen Bryant High School. She was of Hungarian ethnicity, from a family which came to the United States in 1907. The Gedeon family resided in Astoria, Queens, until 1929. They moved to 316 East 50th Street, where Gedeon's mother, Mary, ran a rooming house until December 5, 1936, when the establishment was turned over to a superintendent. Earlier Mary Gedeon operated several speakeasies during the latter portion of the Prohibition era.

== Murderer's profile and arrest ==
The family relocated to an apartment at 316 East 50th Street (Beekman Place in the Turtle Bay neighborhood), where Gedeon's mother took in boarders. Gedeon, her mother, and a roomer in a fifth floor apartment were murdered there on the night of March 28, 1937. A sculptor, Robert George Irwin was later convicted of the triple homicide Irwin spent time in and out of Bellevue Hospital Center and Rockland County Hospital. He was briefly a boarder at the Gedeons but was put out of the household after he developed a crush on Gedeon's sister Ethel.

The manhunt which apprehended Irwin covered eight states and was the largest since the Lindbergh kidnapping. In late June 1937 a Cleveland, Ohio, hotel employee recognized Irwin, whose photograph appeared in the periodical True Detective Mysteries. Irwin was working there as a bellhop but when confronted by the employee fled quickly to Chicago, Illinois, where he was taken into custody by police waiting for him at the depot. Irwin confessed his affection for Ethel and said that the murders had been accidents. He arrived at the Gedeon apartment searching for Ethel but became enraged to find that she no longer lived there. So he killed the Gedeon women and the lodger in anger after Mary Gedeon allowed him to come inside. Having once sculpted a conventional bust of Herbert Hoover, Irwin admitted he wanted to behead Ethel and make a death mask.
