= Wang Xun (pianist) =

Chinese pianist (born 1979)

Wang Xun (Chinese: 王洵; born 1979) is a Chinese pianist born in Qingdao, Shandong province.

Wang began his piano study at the age of five and entered the Central Music Conservatory, the top music school in China just two year later as the youngest student in the history of the school and offered full scholarship.

After studying at Central Music Conservatory in Beijing and at the University of Cincinnati, he traveled to the United States and received his undergraduate and graduate study as a full scholarship student from the Juilliard School in New York City, where he studied with Jerome Lowenthal. He then received his Artist Diploma from the Yale University where he studied with Mr. Boris Berman, also with full scholarship.

He has given solo recitals in the cities of U.S., Spain, Italy, France, England, Australia, Singapore, Japan, Malaysia, and China. He has been a featured soloist with the Beijing Symphony Orchestra, China National Symphony Orchestra the Tenerife Symphony Orchestra of Spain, Senigallia Symphony Orchestra of Italy, Qingdao Symphony Orchestra, Cincinnati Symphony Orchestra, Hamamatsu Symphony of Japan, Sydney Symphony Orchestra of Australia and the Festival Orchestra from Santa Barbara, United States. He has performed at prestigious venues such as the Carnegie Hall and Lincoln Center for the Performing Arts in New York, the John F. Kennedy Center in Washington, Wigmore Hall in London, and the Sydney Opera House in Australia. He has also won first prize in Xing Hai National competition, the Stravinsky International Piano Competition, the Senigallia International Piano Competition, the Gracewelsh International Piano Competition and the Gina Bachauer International Piano Competition.

He has appeared on the McGraw-Hill Companies' Young Artists Showcase on WQXR-FM. He is one of the top musicians from China who has appeared in China Central Television's documentary series Characters produced in 2010. The DVD Piano Prince was released in 2011 features him. A book with five other renowned musicians from China is to be published in the late 2013.
