= Racha Arodaky =

Syrian/French pianist born in Damascus

Racha Arodaky Racha Arodaky
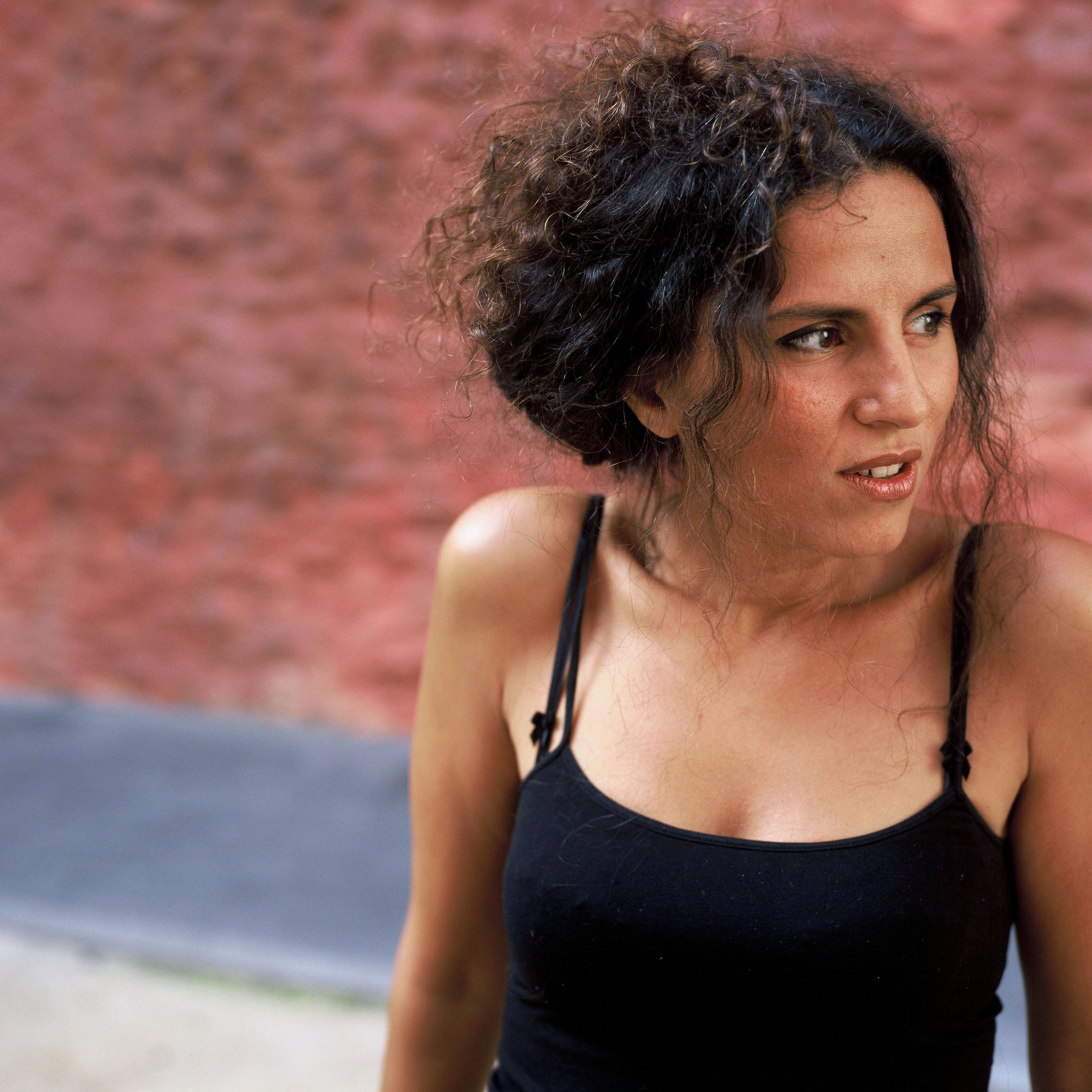
- Racha Arodaky in 2003.

Background information
- Born: Damascus
- Origin: Syria
- Genres: Classical
- Instrument: Piano

Racha Arodaky (French pronunciation: [ʁaʃa arɔdaki]) is a Syrian and French pianist born in Damascus.

== Life and career ==
Arodaky studied music and piano from age thirteen at the Conservatoire de Paris in the class of Dominique Merlet. After receiving her premier prix de conservatoire at age 16, she went to study at the Moscow Conservatory with Yevgeny Malinin. She has also studied with Murray Perahia.

She pursued a career as a recitalist in venues as diverse as the Salle Pleyel and the Salle Gaveau in Paris, Barge Music in New York, the Tchaikovsky Concert Hall in Moscow, the concert halls of Seoul and Busan, the Manege in Reims, Palais de la musique et des congrès, Strasbourg, Palais des Festivals et des Congrès in Cannes and Cairo Opera.

Arodaky has been invited to festivals in France, including the Chopin Festival in Bagatelle, Piano aux Jacobins, Flâneries Musicales de Reims, the Domaine du Rayol, Les Heures Musicales du Haut-Anjou, Pionsat Castle Festival, the Festival Le Touquet Pianissime Sannois Festival, the Chopin Festival in Nohant, the Festival Les Musiciennes on the island of Ouessant, and the Parc Floral de Vincennes. Outside France, she has been invited to the Valldemossa Chopin Festival in Mallorca, and festivals in Schleswig-Holstein in Germany and Brighton, England.

Since 2006, Arodaky has been the artistic director of the Musique à la cour piano festival at the Château de Solliès-Pont in the Var, France.
