= Douglas Weiland =

British composer

Douglas Weiland (born 1954 in Malvern, Worcestershire) is an English modern-classical composer. His works range from the three Sir Neville Marriner commissions: Divertimento for Strings (1992), Clarinet Concerto (2002), Triple Concerto (2006), and two Piano Trios commissioned for Altenberg Trio Wien, to several commissioned choral works and the series of chamber works produced for the Norfolk & Norwich Music Club as their Composer-in-Residence.

Weiland has produced numerous chamber, orchestral and choral works, commissioned for and performed by artists including: Sir Neville Marriner and the Academy of St Martin in the Fields, Altenberg Trio Wien, Australian String Quartet, Marie-Noëlle Kendall, Andrew Marriner, Kenneth Sillito, Steven Isserlis, Susan Milan, and the young Hamer Quartet.

Three early major chamber works (1985–1988) were commissioned for William Hennessy's newly formed Australian String Quartet.

Weiland was Composer-in-Residence for the Norfolk and Norwich Music Club from 2003-2007.

Recent works include three double-choir Motets, and Fourth and Fifth Quartets (Ops. 50 and 51). In August 2014 he completed the large-scale Flute Concerto, Op. 48, for Susan Milan.

== Selected commissions / performances / broadcasts ==
- Third Quartet (op. 39) 2005 Norfolk & Norwich Music Club. Hamer Quartet world premiere ANAM 2007, European premiere 2008;
- Triple Concerto (op. 38) 2006 Sir Neville Marriner and Academy of St Martin in the Fields / Altenberg Trio Wien;
- Third Solo Cello Suite "Isserlis Mikro-Suite" (op. 37) 2004 Norfolk & Norwich Music Club for Steven Isserlis;
- Clarinet Quintet (op. 33) 2003 Norfolk & Norwich Music Club for Andrew Marriner & ASMF Ensemble;
- Second Trio (op.32) "Pavey Ark" 2002 Norfolk & Norwich Music Club for Altenberg Trio Wien;
- Clarinet Concerto (op. 30) 2001 Sir Neville Marriner and Julian Burnside for Andrew Marriner;
- First Trio (op. 22) 1995 Rudolf & Gloria Bretschneider, perf. Raphael Trio and Altenberg Trio (Brahms Saal series - Musikverein);
- Motet ‘Holy Baptisme’ (op. 16) Choir of Trinity College, Cambridge / Richard Marlow (Trinity Chapel, January 1993);
- Divertimento for strings (op. 15) 1991 Sir Neville Marriner and Academy of St Martin in the Fields (Queen Elizabeth Hall);
- Piano Quintet (op. 8) 1988 Australian String Quartet for ASQ & Marie-Noëlle Kendall released ABC Classics/Polygram 1992.;
- First String Quartet (op. 5) 1986 Australia Council for ASQ (>34 perf. incl. Wigmore Hall and La Fenice);
- Voice Quintet (op. 4) 1985. Premiere: ABC live broadcast from the 1986 Adelaide Festival;
- ‘Huge Griffons’ 1992 for RVW Trust/New London Children's Choir/Ronald Corp (St James's/LSO St Luke's/BBC Radio 3)

== Recent works / commissions / projected works / forthcoming performances ==
- ‘Verses From Scripture’ (op. 40). commission for In Voco Parentis, Trinity College Chapel, Cambridge, June 2008
- Benedictus (op. 36/2) Bexhill Choral Society/Kenneth Roberts, cond., 4 October 2008 St Augustine's Bexhill-on-Sea
- Goethe ‘Blumengruß’ (op. 41) (choir/pf/orch)(25 Jahr-Jubiläum der Max Böhm Gesellschaft, Vienna, perf. 11 November 2008)
- Anthem ‘Vere Dominus Est’ (op.42) (SATB double choir a cappella)(David Lowe/Norwich Cathedral, comm. Christopher & Judith Lawrence 2008 for Norwich Cathedral's Festival Eucharist 10 May 2009)
