= William Hennessy (violinist) =

William Eldred Hennessy AM is an Australian violinist who founded the Australian String Quartet.

== Career ==
Hennessy led the Australian String Quartet from its formation in 1985 until 1996.

From 2006 until the end of 2021 he was artistic director of the Melbourne Chamber Orchestra, the orchestra which Jeffrey Crellin founded in 1991 under its original name Australia Pro Arte Chamber Orchestra.

For decades Hennessy has seen advocacy of the music of Douglas Weiland as his primary artistic responsibility. In 2018 he created The Weiland Project in order to bring the music of Weiland to world attention. He also continues to advocate for the music of the Australian composers Richard Mills AM, Calvin Bowman and Benjamin Martin.

He was closely associated with the development of next-generation Australian chamber music ensembles such the TinAlley Quartet, Flinders Quartet, Hamer Quartet, and the Seraphim Trio, and has been a mentor to many string players who are now at the forefront of Australian professional musical life. He remains deeply committed to musicians of the future.

Other positions previously held include Head of Strings at the University of Melbourne, concertmaster of the Tasmanian Symphony Orchestra, deputy leader and founder member of the Australian Chamber Orchestra, member of the London-based Academy of St Martin in the Fields, faculty member of the Australian National Academy of Music, and founder/director of the Tasmanian Symphony Chamber Players, the Melbourne University Chamber Orchestra, and the Adelaide Youth Chamber Orchestra.

He has made hundreds of concerto appearances and has been recognised as one of Australia's leading violinists and music educators.

== Honours and recognition ==
In the 2018 Queen's Birthday Honours William Eldred Hennessy was appointed a Member of the Order of Australia for "For significant service to music as a concert violinist, artistic director, mentor and educator".
