= Gustavo Núñez =

Uruguayan bassoonist (born 1965)

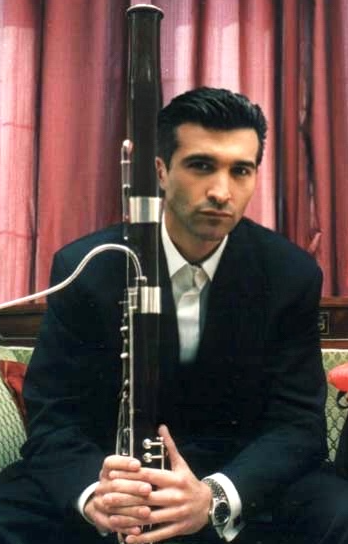
- Núñez in 2005

Background information
- Born: February 15, 1965 (age 61); Montevideo Uruguay
- Genres: Classical Music
- Occupation: Musician
- Instrument: Bassoon
- Years active: 1979-present
- Member of: Royal Concertgebouw Orchestra since 1995
- Formerly of: Orquesta Sinfónica Simón Bolívar 1979-1981; Staatstheater Darmstadt 1988-1989; Bamberger Symphoniker 1989-1995

Gustavo Núñez (born in Montevideo, 15 February 1965) is a Uruguayan bassoonist trained at Musikhochschule Hannover with Klaus Thunemann and the Royal College of Music with Kerry Camden. He has been principal bassoon of the Royal Concertgebouw Orchestra, together with Ronald Karten, since 1995. In Madrid, at the Reina Sofía School of Music, Núñez is referred to as 'el gran profesor de fagot' ('the great professor of bassoon') in recognition of his expertise and contribution to the field.

He holds a professorship at the Robert Schumann Hochschule in Düsseldorf, Germany, and he has held the Bassoon Chair at the Reina Sofía School of Music's Madrid since 2016. In addition, he serves as a permanent guest lecturer at the Conservatory of Amsterdam.

Núñez gives masterclasses and has made solo appearances in the US, Canada, various South American countries, the UK, France, Germany, Italy, Spain, Finland, Australia, South Korea and Japan and is considered to be one of the world's greatest bassoon players.

== Early life ==
Gustavo Núñez family is greatly connected to classical music. His grandfather, a clarinetist who emigrated from Spain to Argentina with his five children, passed on his musical legacy, as four of his children, including Gustavo's father, became professional musicians. His father, originally from Santiago de Compostela, Galicia, Spain, was a bassoonist with the Orquesta del Sodre in Montevideo, as were Gustavo's grandfather and three brothers. His father was not only a prominent bassoonist but also one of the few bassoon teachers in Venezuela at the time, establishing an influential bassoon program in Latin America. Gustavo started learning to play the violin at the age of five, but always wanted to play the bassoon, following in his father's footsteps. However, due to the size of the instrument, he had to wait until he was physically big enough to handle it.

In 1969, the Núñez family had to move from Uruguay because his father, who was on the blacklist of the Uruguayan intelligence service at the time, refused to perform at the American embassy with his wind quintet as a protest against the Vietnam War, leading to serious consequences for the family. They moved to Caracas, Venezuela, after Gustavo's father was offered a position with the Orquesta Sinfónica de Venezuela. In Caracas, Gustavo attended a music-focused school where his father also taught music theory. At the age of 13 he began formal lessons.

At the age of 16, Gustavo left Venezuela to continue his studies in England with Kerry Camden, son of Archie Camden, who was the teacher of Brian Pollard. Despite financial struggles, Gustavo lived with his brother, who was also studying music, and worked hard to pursue his passion. After two years, he returned to Caracas to earn money, playing second bassoon with the Orquesta Sinfónica Municipal de Caracas at the age of 18. However, his ambition led him to study under Klaus Thunemann in Hannover at the prestigious Hochschule für Musik, Theater und Medien Hannover, where he dedicated himself to intense practice, studying eight to nine hours a day. 'Thunemann played beautifully, never forced, and with a round sound—I learned the most from him,' Núñez later reflected.

== Career ==
Núñez career as a symphonic musician began in 1979, at the age of 14 in Caracas, Venezuela, where he was hired by the now famous Simón Bolívar Orchestra. His professional career in Europe took off after he won two prestigious awards during his studies: the Prix Suisse from the Geneva International Music Competition (1987) and first prize at the “Carl Maria von Weber” Competition in Munich (1987). These accolades quickly helped solidify his reputation as one of the leading bassoonists of his generation.

He was the principal bassoonist in the orchestra of the Staatstheater Darmstadt (1988–1989) and the Bamberg Symphony Orchestra (1989–1995). During his time in Germany, he applied for the position of principal bassoonist with the Royal Concertgebouw Orchestra in Amsterdam, a position he won and has held for over 25 years.

In addition to his orchestral work, Núñez has been deeply committed to teaching. He began teaching in 1999, first at the Folkwang University of the Arts in Essen, and later at the Robert Schumann Hochschule in Düsseldorf. In 2016, he was invited to succeed his former teacher Thunemann, as professor of bassoon at the Reina Sofía School of Music in Madrid. While he teaches only bassoon in Düsseldorf, his role in Madrid is broader, as he also serves as a professor of chamber music, which differs from orchestral music in that it involves smaller ensembles and closer collaboration between the musicians.

Beyond his orchestral and teaching career, Núñez has collaborated with Ben Bell and the Amsterdam Bassoon Center to create the Bell Amsterdam model bassoon, tailored to his specifications. This partnership reflects his influence and expertise in bassoon craftsmanship, and the model is available for trial at the Amsterdam Bassoon Center.

Núñez has made numerous recordings, showcasing works by composers such as Mozart, Vivaldi, Devienne, Villa-Lobos, and Gubaidulina. His recordings include collaborations with the Concertgebouw Chamber Orchestra and the Academy of St Martin in the Fields.

Though based in Europe, Núñez has maintained a strong connection to his native Uruguay. In 1996, he returned to Montevideo for the first time to perform publicly, with a series of concerts at the Palacio Taranco. Since then, he has continued to perform in Uruguay, finding personal fulfilment in these performances and maintaining ties to his homeland.

== Instruments ==
Gustavo Núñez plays on two bassoons, both crafted by the renowned German instrument maker Heckel, known for its dominance in the field of bassoon manufacturing. His primary bassoon, acquired in 1987 during his student years, is modeled after the instrument used by his teacher Thunemann, but with a different color. Núñez opted for a dark brown instrument, as opposed to Thunemann's red bassoon. Núñez once said of his instrument: "It's so dark red that you might think it's brown." He further remarked that this bassoon has been a constant companion throughout his career.

His second instrument, also a Heckel and similarly brown, was acquired in 2011 after a five-year wait, which he described as lengthy—though nowadays the wait time for a new Heckel bassoon is even longer, stretching to 15 years.

Although visually identical, Núñez notes subtle differences between the two bassoons, both in playability and tone. Depending on the repertoire, he chooses one instrument over the other. Switching between instruments, however, requires a period of adjustment. "When I switch bassoons, I need to practice on it for days to rediscover my embouchure and to figure out how to get the sound I want," he explained.

== Competition record ==
- 1987 Geneva International Music Competition, Prix Suisse.
- 1987 Carl Maria von Weber IBC, 1st prize

== Recordings ==
- Vivaldi - 6 Bassoon Concertos. Gustavo Núñez, Academy of St Martin in the Fields. PENTATONE PTC 5186539 (2016)
- The Barber of Neville. Wind concertos by Howard Blake. Sir Neville Marriner, Andrew Marriner, Jaime Martin, Gustavo Núñez, Academy of St Martin in the Fields. PENTATONE PTC 5186506 (2013)
- Capricho, Bassoon Concertos, Channel Classics Records, 2012
- Mozart - Wind Concertos. Jacob Slagter, Emily Beynon, Alexei Ogrintchouk, Henk Rubingh, Gustavo Núñez, Concertgebouw Chamber Orchestra. PENTATONE PTC 5186079 (2005)
- Festliches Barock (1991)
