= Parikian =

Parikian is a surname of Armenian origin.

== People ==
- Diana Parikian (1926–2012), British antiquarian bookseller
- Manoug Parikian (1920–1987), British concert violinist and violin professor of Armenian descent
- Meghrig Parikian (1968-2021), Bishop in the Armenian Apostolic Church
