= Bram van Sambeek =

Dutch bassoonist (born 1980)

- Born: 1980 (age 45–46); Groningen
- Genres: Classical Music
- Occupation: Bassoonist
- Instrument: Bassoon
- Label: BIS Records
- Formerly of: ORBI; Orlando Quintet; Vivaldi Rocks
- Website: http://www.bramvansambeek.com

Bram van Sambeek (born 1980) is a Dutch bassoon soloist and teacher.

He was principal bassoonist in the Rotterdam Philharmonic Orchestra (2002–2011) and played as a regular guest principal in the London Symphony Orchestra and Mahler Chamber Orchestra. He has performed as a soloist with many orchestras like the Gothenburg Symphony Orchestra, Lahti Symphony Orchestra, and the Rotterdam Philharmonic Orchestra, and has an ongoing cooperation with BIS Records.

Van Sambeek held a professorship at the Hochschule für Musik und Tanz Köln from 2017 until 2021. Since 2019 he teaches exclusively at the Royal Conservatory of The Hague.

== Early life and education ==
Bram van Sambeek started playing the bassoon when he was 10 years old. Initially he took classes with Fred Gaasterland. At the Royal Conservatory of The Hague he was taught by Joep Terwey and Johan Steinmann. After graduating the took classes with Gustavo Núñez and master classes with Klaus Thunemann and Sergio Azzolini. At the age of 15, he joined the National Youth Orchestra of the Netherlands, and from the age of 18 until 20 he played in the Gustav Mahler Jugendorchester.

The Heckel bassoon that Van Sambeek plays was made in 1970 and is the Heckel #11174. This instrument was previously used by Klaus Thunemann and Sergio Azzolini.

== Career ==
From 1997 onwards, Van Sambeek played chamber music with, among others, the Orlando Quintet. He also plays regularly at chamber music festivals such as the Delft Chamber Music Festival, the Lockenhaus Chamber Music Festival, the West Cork Chamber Music Festival, and the Storioni Festival

In the past, he was part of the Schulhoff Trio and formed a duo with Izhar Elias, with whom he played on the album Bassoon Kaleidoscope.

From 2012 to 2015, van Sambeek was admitted to and participated in, The Bowers Program of the Chamber Music Society of the Lincoln Center in New York.

In 2002, van Sambeek started out as solo and first bassoonist at the Rotterdam Philharmonic Orchestra. In 2011, he left the Rotterdam Philharmonic Orchestra because he wanted to focus on chamber music and his soloist career.

From 2007 onwards, van Sambeek is a regular guest solo bassoonist at the London Symphony Orchestra, the Mahler Chamber Orchestra, and many other orchestras.

Van Sambeek also teaches bassoon:

- 2009–2015: Bassoon teacher at Codarts Rotterdam
- 2013–2017: Bassoon teacher at Conservatorium van Amsterdam/Amsterdam University of the Arts
- 2015–2017: Bassoon teacher at the Royal Conservatory of The Hague
- 2017–2021: Professor at the Hochschule für Musik und Tanz Köln, Cologne, Germany
- 2019–present: Bassoon teacher at the Royal Conservatory of The Hague

Van Sambeek is involved with special projects:

- Vivaldi Rocks is a project where Van Sambeek and his ensemble ORBI works together with Hugo Ticciati and his O/Modernt Chamber Orchestra. They mix Vivaldi's concerti with rock songs to introduce people to old composers.
- Save the Bassoon. In June 2015, the Holland Festival started a campaign called Save the Bassoon and asked Bram van Sambeek to be their spokesperson. The campaign was designed to make people aware of the importance of this wind instrument and to encourage young musicians to take it up. The campaign highlights the scarcity in bassoonists and some other orchestral instruments that are under threat, such as the oboe, French horn, viola, trombone, and double bass.

== Awards ==
- 1999: SJMN - Musical Talent of the Year The Netherlands
- 2008: 2nd prize in the International Gillet-Fox Competition organized by the International Double Reed Society
- 2009: The Dutch Music Award; awarded by the Ministry of Education, Culture and Science (OCW) to a musician working in the field of classical music. Bram van Sambeek was the only bassoonist to date to receive this award
- 2011: Borletti-Buitoni Trust Award
- 2018: BBC Music Magazine Award for the album Fagerlund & Aho: Bassoon Concertos with label BIS Records
- 2024: Gouden Viooltje

== Discography ==
Albums:

- Bach on the Bassoon (2022). Label: BIS Records
- Mozart, Weber & DuPuy: Bassoon Concertos (2020). Label: BIS Records
- ORBI: The Oscilating Revenge of the Background Instruments (2019). Label: BIS Records
- Fagerlund & Aho: Bassoon Concertos (2016). Label: BIS Records
- Bassoon Kaleidoscope (2012). Label: Brilliant Records
- Bram van Sambeek: The Art of the Bassoon (2009). Label: Brilliant Records
