= Manoug Parikian =

British concert violinist and violin professor

Manoug Parikian (15 September 1920 – 24 December 1987) was a British concert violinist and violin professor.

== Early life ==
Parikian was born in Mersin to Armenian parents. He studied in London.

== Career ==
Parikian made his solo début in 1947 and led several orchestras: the Liverpool Philharmonic (1947–1948), London's Philharmonia Orchestra (1949–1957), the Yorkshire Sinfonia 1976–1978. He was musical director of the Manchester Camerata from 1980–1984. He also led the English Opera Group Orchestra between 1949 and 1951, and participated in various Aldeburgh Festival concerts as a chamber musician as well as in opera productions. In 1953 he was selected by Sir Adrian Boult to play in the orchestra for the Coronation of Elizabeth II.

He was an admired teacher at the Royal Academy of Music. He also championed contemporary composers, many of whom wrote works for him: examples include Thea Musgrave's Colloquy (1960), Gordon Crosse's Violin Concerto No. 2, Alexander Goehr's Violin Concerto (1961–1962) and Hugh Wood's Violin Concerto.

Benjamin Britten also composed for Parikian a cadenza to Mozart's Adagio for Violin and Orchestra K261 in 1951, and was assisted by Parikian when revising the solo part of his own violin concerto, originally composed in 1938–1939.

== Personal life ==
In 1957, he married the musician turned antiquarian bookseller Diana Carbutt, who was divorced from the conductor Neville Marriner, with whom she had one son, the clarinettist Andrew Marriner, and one daughter, the writer Susie Harries. They had two sons together, Stepan (Step) and Levon (Lev).

Parikian died in Oxford in 1987, aged 67. On the day of his death (Christmas Eve) BBC2 featured a performance of his, in the Antonio Stradivari Gala Celebration. His death was announced after the broadcast.

== Notes ==
Sources

- Mitchell, Donald (2004). Reed, Philip; Cooke, Mervyne (eds.). Letters from a Life: The Selected Letters of Benjamin Britten, Volume III, 1946–1951. London: Faber and Faber. ISBN 057122282X.
