= Jiří Tancibudek =

Australian musician

Jiří Tancibudek AM (5 March 1921 – 1 May 2004) was a Czech-born Australian oboist, conductor and teacher of great renown in his adopted country and elsewhere. His obituary in the Adelaide Review, titled "Prince of the oboe", said of his playing:

His performing was characterised by a brilliant agility, but always at the service of a singing line. He was particularly renowned for a sparkling upper register, beyond the reach of all but a few of his contemporaries. Critics worldwide consistently commented on his excellence, lauding his "superb craftsmanship", "ease and naturalness of playing", "effortless virtuosity", "expressive shading"‚ and "tonal beauty".

== Biography ==
Jiří Tancibudek was born at Mnichovo Hradiště, Czechoslovakia (now in the Czech Republic). His first teacher was Jan Mikeš. He studied at the Prague Conservatory, and in 1944 became oboist with the National Theatre Orchestra. In 1945 he was appointed Principal Oboe of both the Czech Philharmonic (under Rafael Kubelík) and the Czech Chamber Orchestra (under Václav Talich).

In 1947 he met and became lifelong friends with the Australian oboist Charles Mackerras, who was studying conducting under Václav Talich in Prague. Mackerras mentioned that he had never heard an opera by Leoš Janáček, so Tancibudek suggested he attend a performance of Káťa Kabanová that was then playing. Mackerras did, and this experience sparked his interest in the music of Janáček, to the point that he became a world-renowned expert in Janáček's music in particular and in Czech music in general. Also in 1947, Tancibudek attended master classes with Léon Goossens in England.

Due to his senior position with the Czech Philharmonic, Tancibudek was in no immediate danger of harassment from the Communist authorities in Czechoslovakia; however, his wife Vera née Hašková, a pianist, was in a much more precarious position. They decided to escape from Czechoslovakia into Bavaria, West Germany in January 1950. To fool the authorities by making it look as if they had just gone out for a walk, they could take nothing with them, but he did manage to take his oboe. They lived in a displaced persons' camp in West Germany, struggling to save enough money to emigrate to Canada. However, there was no employment for an oboist in Canada at that time, so instead they turned their sights to Australia. The British conductor John Barbirolli arranged with the then Director of the NSW Conservatorium of Music, his compatriot Eugene Goossens (Léon Goossens's brother), for Jiří Tancibudek to become a teacher there, and he arrived in Sydney in 1950. (In the meantime, he had been offered a post with the Chicago Symphony Orchestra, but the offer of a visa did not extend to his wife at that time, so he had no choice but to decline.)

In Sydney he and his wife presented the first oboe and piano recital ever given in Australia. In 1953 he became Principal Oboe with the Victorian Symphony Orchestra (as the Melbourne Symphony Orchestra (MSO) was then known), a position he held for 11 years. He played with Yehudi Menuhin at the 1962 Adelaide Festival of Arts, at the invitation of John Bishop. At Bishop's behest, he moved to Adelaide in 1964 to become Professor of Oboe at the Elder Conservatorium, University of Adelaide (until 1986). He was also a foundation member of the University of Adelaide Wind Quintet, the first Australian chamber group to tour internationally. From 1973 to 1985 he was the conductor of the University of Adelaide Chamber Orchestra. From 1978 to 1986 he was Reader in Music (Oboe) at the university.

He could not return to his native country until February 1969, when he played there with the University of Adelaide Wind Quintet. But his name was generally suppressed by the Czech authorities until 1989, when he returned to Czech Republic, on the strength of the direct invitation letter from the president Václav Havel, to give concerts and master classes, and to be a jury member of the Prague Spring International Music Festival.

In the Australia Day Honours of 1989, Tancibudek was appointed a Member of the Order of Australia (AM).

He visited Japan in 1991 and 1995 as a jury member of Tokyo International Oboe Competition (sponsored by Sony).

Jiří Tancibudek died on 1 May 2004, on board an aircraft passing over Central Australia, while en route to attend the 7 May 2004 wedding of his granddaughter Sarah in Vienna. A memorial concert to Tancibudek was held at Elder Hall at the University of Adelaide on 15 August 2004, involving musicians who had travelled from Berlin, Vienna, Hong Kong and many parts of Australia. They all gave their services free of charge, in aid of a new "Jiří Tancibudek Memorial Scholarship" established by the Elder School of Music. Other tributes included that of Daniel Barenboim, who wrote to his widow, "He was an exceptional human being and a great musician".

== Premieres and works written for him ==
Bohuslav Martinů's Concerto for Oboe and Small Orchestra (1955) was written for Jiří Tancibudek at his request. It was sponsored by the Sydney Daily Telegraph in celebration of the 1956 Olympic Games in Melbourne. It had its world premiere in August 1956 in Sydney, with the Sydney Symphony Orchestra conducted by Hans Schmidt-Isserstedt.

Tancibudek also gave the European premiere (Hamburg, March 1958), and local premieres in Vienna and Vancouver. He gave the British premiere with the conductor Maurice Miles for a BBC broadcast, and his friend Evelyn Rothwell, John Barbirolli's wife. gave the public premiere with her husband conducting at a prom the following summer.

Jindřich Feld's Oboe Concerto, arguably the best 20th century oboe concerto after Martinů, was written for Tancibudek.

Colin Brumby's first work to receive a professional performance, the Romance for Oboe and Strings, was premiered in 1954 by Jiří Tancibudek with the Melbourne Symphony Orchestra.

Margaret Sutherland wrote her Concertante for Oboe and Strings for him in 1961.

Other composers who wrote for him included Ian Keith Harris, Miriam Hyde, Dorian Le Gallienne, and Franz Holford.

== Students ==
Tancibudek's students included: Norman Weiner (who succeeded him as Principal Oboe with the MSO, and who was in turn the grand-teacher of Diana Doherty); Jeffrey Crellin (another MSO Principal Oboe); David Nuttall; Anne Gilby; Peter Veale; Vivienne Brooke;, David Sydney Morgan and Ian Keith Harris.

== Lineage ==
His daughters Sandra and Eve carry on his musical lineage: Sandra is a string player based in Berlin, and Eve is an Adelaide-based teacher. His grandson Raphael Christ is concert master of the Bochumer Symphoniker and his granddaughter Sarah is a former harpist of the Vienna Philharmonic, one of the very few female members of that orchestra. Further two granddaughters are musically active. Hannah plays the oboe and Sophia is currently studying violin.
