= Carbutt =

Carbutt is a surname. Notable people with the surname include:

- Edward Carbutt (1838–1905), English mechanical engineer and politician
- John Carbutt (1832–1905), English photographer and businessman
- Noel Carbutt (1895–1964), English cricketer
- Paul Carbutt (1950–2004), English cyclist
- Diana Parikian, born Diana Carbutt, (1926–2012), British antiquarian bookseller

== See also ==
- Carbutt Glacier, glacier of Antarctica
