= Andrew Marriner =

English clarinettist (born 1954)

- Born: Andrew Stephen Marriner; 25 February 1954 (age 72)
- Occupations: Classical musician, former principal clarinet of the London Symphony Orchestra
- Instrument: Clarinet

Andrew Marriner (born 25 February 1954) is a British solo, chamber and orchestral clarinettist. He became principal of the London Symphony Orchestra (LSO) in 1986 following the footsteps of the late Jack Brymer until he ended his tenure in 2019. During his orchestral career he maintained his place on the worldwide solo concert platform alongside an active role in the field of chamber music.

== Career ==
Andrew Marriner, son of Sir Neville Marriner and his wife Diana Parikian, was educated at King's College School, Cambridge (where he was a chorister), King's School, Canterbury, New College, Oxford, and the Hochschule für Musik, Hannover.

He first played with the LSO in 1977 under Sergiu Celibidache and as guest principal on their 1983 world tour. He later became principal clarinet of the Academy of St Martin in the Fields, a position he held alongside his commitment to the LSO until 2008. Marriner is the son of the founder of the Academy of St Martin in the Fields, Sir Neville Marriner.

As a soloist, Marriner has been a regular performer in London, both at the Barbican and the Royal Festival Hall. His extensive career abroad has taken him to La Scala Milan, La Fenice Venice, the Musikverein in Vienna and across the United States and Australia, recently to Melbourne for Concertos by Mozart and Douglas Weiland with the Melbourne Chamber Orchestra. Marriner has given the world premières of concertos written for him by Robin Holloway, Dominic Muldowney and John Tavener.

He is a member of the LSO chamber ensemble and has enjoyed playing with many other international groups over the years. These include the Lindsay, Endellion, Moscow, Warsaw, Orlando, Sine Nomine and Belcea string quartets. He has worked with some of the most distinguished individuals in the world of chamber music such as Alfred Brendel, André Previn, András Schiff, Lynn Harrell, Stephen Isserlis, Emanuel Ax, Hélène Grimaud, Sylvia McNair, Edita Gruberova and with the late Vlado Perlemuter and George Malcolm.

In addition to numerous recordings with the LSO, on disc and for film and TV, Andrew has recorded the core solo and chamber clarinet repertoire with various record companies including Philips, EMI, Chandos and Collins Classics. His concerto appearances are regularly broadcast by the BBC. Recent recording projects include Ronald Corp's Clarinet Quintet with the New London Orchestra and Howard Blake's Clarinet Concerto with Sir Neville Marriner and The Academy of St Martin in the Fields on PENTATONE.

Marinner is in demand as a teacher and woodwind consultant and gives masterclasses, coaches orchestras and adjudicates competitions all around the world. Over the years, he has taught at the Sydney Conservatory, Australian National Academy in Melbourne, Juilliard School, Hong Kong Academy, Accademia de la Musica in Rome and regularly coaches players with the New World Symphony in Miami. He is a regular panelist for the Donatella Flick Conducting Competition, is on the Advisory Committee of the Solti Foundation and a Trustee of the Hattori Foundation. Marriner is a D'Addrio Woodwinds Artist as well as a Buffet Crampon Artist. He is professor at the Guildhall School of Music and Drama and the Royal Academy of Music, and was awarded an Hon. Ram in 1996.

Before the COVID-19 pandemic, Marriner went to California three times. The first was to visit Colburn school to teach at the behest of Yehuda Gilhad. While at Colburn, he joined the students in performing chamber music. In April 2019, Marriner joined the Los Angeles Chamber Orchestra to perform Mozart's Clarinet Concerto in A Major. His third visit to California was to the Music Academy of the West in Santa Barbara to teach.

In 2019, after being with the LSO for 41 years and Principal Clarinet for 34, he left the orchestra. He has continued as a chamber music partner with Magdalena Kozena and Sir Simon Rattle to participate in a series of concerts traveling about Europe in 2022.

== Selected discography ==
- The Barber of Neville. Howard Blake – Wind concertos. Sir Neville Marriner, Andrew Marriner, Jaime Martin, Gustavo Núñez, Academy of St Martin in the Fields. PENTATONE PTC 5186506 (2013).
- Anniversary Album – Academy of St Martin in the Fields. Wolfgang Amadeus Mozart – Clarinet Concerto, Clarinet Quintet. Sir Neville Marriner, Andrew Marriner, Kenneth Sillito, Harvey de Souza, Robert Smissen, Stephen Orton, Academy of St Martin in the Fields. PENTATONE PTC 5186048 (2004).
