= Forbes Robinson =

British opera singer

Peter Forbes Robinson (21 May 1926 – 13 May 1987) was a British bass, born in Macclesfield, best known for his performances in works by Mozart, Verdi, and Britten.

== Career ==
He created the title role in Michael Tippett's King Priam. His recordings include the Philips recording with Sir Colin Davis of Britten's Peter Grimes, as Swallow; he may also be heard in a live 1972 recording of Arthur Bliss's The Olympians, in which he plays Joseph Lavatte. He sang the part of Géronte de Ravoir in Manon Lescaut on UK television in 1983. According to Grove, he studied at the training school of La Scala, Milan and joined the Covent Garden Opera company in 1954, singing Monterone in Verdi's Rigoletto, which he was still singing in the 1970s, among 60 roles he undertook with the company. He created Claggart in Britten's Billy Budd (1962). In 1966 he sang at the Teatro Colón, Buenos Aires. He sang extensively for Welsh National Opera, roles including King Philip in Verdi's Don Carlo, Mozart's Don Giovanni (a wonderfully seedy characterization), the title role in Boris Godunov and Fiesco in Verdi's Simon Boccanegra.Grove says he had "a dark, expressive voice, evenly produced and capable of subtle characterization." In 1967 he made a recording of Handel arias on Argo Eclipse with the Academy of St Martin-in-the-Fields cond. Philip Ledger. It is said that he had a considerable rivalry with Welsh bass-baritone Geraint Evans.

== Private life ==
He was born in Macclesfield and died in London. He married in 1952.

== Discography ==
- Handel, G. F. Chandos Anthem No. 9 (recorded July 1965, reissued 1988 on Decca CD 421 150). Elizabeth Vaughan, Alexander Young, Forbes Robinson, Andrew Davis, John Langdon. In Handel, Antífonas de la Coronación. Antífona de Chandos Nº 9. English Chamber Orchestra, Academy of St Martin in the Fields, Choir of King's College, Cambridge / Sir David Willcocks. CD. (Música Sacra, 13). Barcelona: Altaya, 1996.
- Verdi, Giuseppe. La Traviata: Melodrama en tres actos de Francesco Maria Piave (20-6-1958). Orchestra and Chorus of the Royal Opera House Covent Garden, London. With Maria Callas, Cesare Valletti, Mario Zanasi, Marie Collier, Lea Roberts, Dermont Troy, Forbes Robinson, Ronald Lewis, David Kelly. Dir. Nicola Rescigno. New Remastering. 2 CDs. (Maria Callas). Barcelona: DiVa/RBA, 2000.
- Britten, Benjamin. Rejoice in the Lamb: Festival cantata, op. 30. The Choir of St. John's College Cambridge. With Roger Parker, Michael Pearce, Robert Tear. Dir.: George Guest. Organ: Brian Runnett Decca Record Co Ltd, London. Recorded 1966. Digitally remastered 1990
- Handel Arias. The Academy of St Martin in the Fields, directed by Philip Ledger, Argo Eclipse 1967 reissued 1974.

== Sources ==
- CLASSICALmanac
- Forbes Robinson at IMDb
- James Anderson, The Complete Dictionary of Opera and Operetta.
