= Altenberg Trio =

The Altenberg Trio is a piano trio formed in 1994 in Vienna. It is named after a Viennese poet Peter Altenberg. Since its debut during the Salzburg Mozart Week in 1994, it is one of the few full-time piano trios in Europe. The ensemble became Trio-in-residence of Vienna's Gesellschaft der Musikfreunde (Musikverein) where it gives an annual series of concerts in the Brahms Saal. Their repertoire encompasses more than 250 piano trios, among them works that were composed for and premiered by the Altenberg Trio, such as Douglas Weiland's First Trio, opus 22 (1995).

In 1999, following the release of their recording of the complete Schumann piano trios, the Trio received the Robert Schumann Award of the City of Zwickau. Their recording of trios of Ives (Piano Trio), Copland and Bernstein (Piano Trio) won the Edison Award in Amsterdam in 2000.

In 2012 Christopher Hinterhuber replaced Claus-Christian Schuster as pianist and Christoph Stradner replaced Alexander Gebert as cellist.

In 2018 Ziyu He replaced founding member Amiram Ganz as violinist.

Ziyu He plays the „Grumiaux“ violin by Jean-Baptiste Vuillaume, made in 1855, Christoph Stradner a cello by Antonio Stradivari, 1680.

== Members ==
- Ziyu He (violin)
- Christopher Hinterhuber (piano)
- Christoph Stradner (violoncello)
