= James Johnston (tenor) =

- Born: 11 August 1903; Belfast
- Died: 17 October 1991 (aged 88) Belfast
- Occupation: Singer (tenor)

James Johnston (11 August 1903 – 17 October 1991) was a Northern Irish lyric tenor, principally in opera.

He was born in Belfast, to Thomas and Margaret Johnston; he sang in the church choir and in 1917 won his first competition as a baritone.

Johnston had no formal training and began his working life as a butcher in his father's shop. He entered numerous competitions - winning all but one he entered - and supplemented his income by singing in semi-professional performances around Ireland. After positive notices of a performance in Rigoletto in Dublin in 1940, he was offered a contract with Sadler's Wells Opera, where he stayed for almost ten years, becoming principal tenor.

During his career Johnston played a wide range of roles, despite no formal acting training, from Pinkerton in Madama Butterfly to the title role in Gounod's Faust. He appeared as Adorno in the British premiere of Simon Boccanegra in 1948, and created the role of Hector de Florac in Arthur Bliss's opera The Olympians, premiered a year later. He made his Covent Garden debut in La Traviata opposite Elisabeth Schwarzkopf in 1949. During his career he also appeared with Maria Callas, Joan Sutherland and Victoria de los Ángeles amongst others.

He retired in 1958 at the peak of his powers, and resumed work in the family butchers business. Despite making several recordings, very few survived into the CD era, and it was not until 1994 that Testament Records released a CD devoted to his recorded performances, made between 1947 and 1951.

A mural of Johnston was created in Belfast in 2012.

== Family ==
He was married to Margaret, and they had three children.
