= Piano Trio (Bernstein) =

1937 composition by Leonard Bernstein

- by Leonard Bernstein
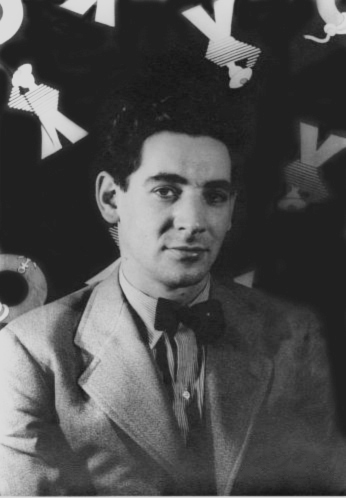
- The composer in 1944
- Performed: 1937
- Movements: three
- Scoring: Piano, violin, cello

Leonard Bernstein's Piano Trio for piano, violin, and cello was written in 1937 while he was attending Harvard University as a student of Walter Piston. He was influenced by the conductor Dimitri Mitropoulos. Several melodic ideas were recycled for use in later pieces; for example, the opening of the second movement was used later by Bernstein in his first musical, On the Town.

== Premiere ==
The piano trio was premiered in 1937 at Harvard University by the Madison Trio: Mildred Spiegel, Dorothy Rosenberg, Sarah Kruskall. It was published by Boosey & Hawkes. The work takes about 16 minutes to perform.

== Movements ==
The Trio is written in three movements:

1. Adagio non troppo – Più mosso – Allegro vivace
2. Tempo di marcia
3. Largo – Allegro vivo et molto ritmico

== Awards ==
In 2000, the Altenberg Trio's recording of this piano trio won the Edison Award in Amsterdam.
