= Neville Marriner =

English conductor and violinist (1924–2016)

Sir Neville Marriner CH CBE
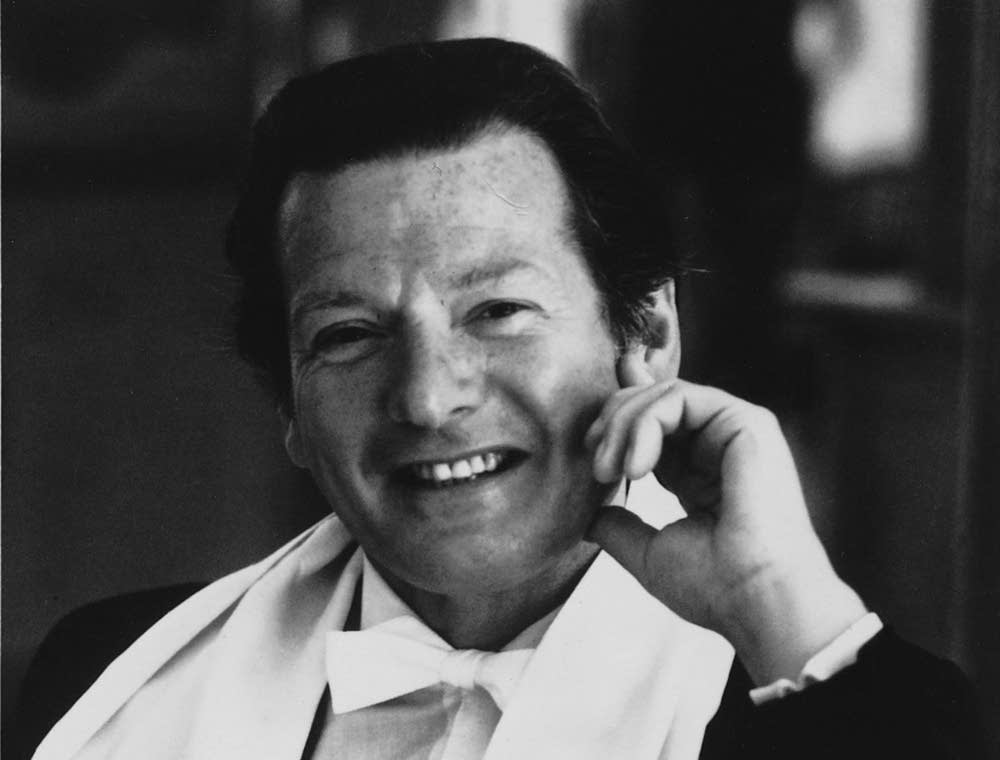
- Marriner in 1982
- Born: Neville Marriner; 15 April 1924; Lincoln, England
- Died: 2 October 2016 (aged 92); London, England
- Occupations: Conductor; violinist
- Years active: 1948–2016
- Organization: Academy of St. Martin in the Fields
- Spouses: Diana Carbutt (m. 1949; div. 1956); Molly Sims (m. 1957)
- Children: 2, including Andrew

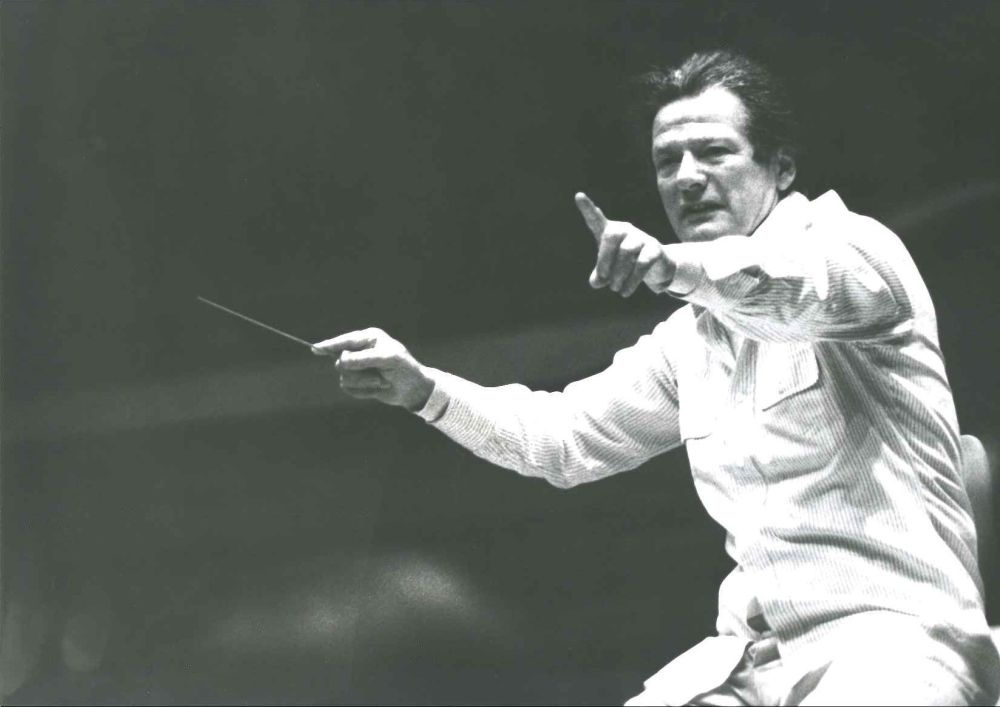
Marriner conducting in the 1980s

Sir Neville Marriner, CH, CBE (15 April 1924 – 2 October 2016) was an English conductor and violinist. Described as "one of the world's greatest conductors", Gramophone lists Marriner as one of the 50 greatest conductors and another compilation ranks Marriner number 14 of the 18 "Greatest and Most Famous Conductors of All Time". He founded the Academy of St Martin in the Fields, and his partnership with them is the most recorded of any orchestra and conductor.

== Early life ==
Marriner was born in Lincoln, England, the son of Herbert Marriner, a carpenter, and his wife Ethel (née Roberts). He was educated at Lincoln School (then a grammar school), where he played in a jazz band with the composer Steve Race. He initially learned the violin as well as the piano from his father, and later studied the violin with Frederick Mountney.

In 1939 he went to the Royal College of Music in London, where he studied with the violinist William Henry Reed and was able to play among the second violins of the London Symphony Orchestra, conducted by Henry Wood, because many of its members had joined up after the outbreak of the Second World War. He joined up himself in 1941, serving in a reconnaissance role in the British Army, but was invalided out in 1943 with kidney problems. He returned to the Royal College, although Reed had died in the meantime. He then attended the Paris Conservatoire, where he studied with the violinist René Benedetti.

== Career ==
Marriner was briefly a music teacher at Eton College. In 1948, he became a professor of the Royal College of Music. In 1948 or 1949, he took up the position of second violinist of the Martin String Quartet, continuing to play with the quartet for 13 years. He had met the harpsichordist Thurston Dart while recuperating from kidney damage during the war, and they formed a duo together, which expanded to the Virtuoso String Trio with Peter Gibbs. These were the precursors to Dart's Jacobean Ensemble, in which Marriner played from 1951. He played the violin in two London orchestras: the Philharmonia Orchestra in the early 1950s, and the London Symphony Orchestra (LSO), i.a. under Josef Krips, as principal second violin (1954–69). He also played with the chamber orchestras of Reginald Jacques and Boyd Neel, as well as the London Mozart Players.

In 1958 he founded the Academy of St Martin in the Fields; initially a twelve-member chamber ensemble, it soon expanded to a chamber orchestra, and attracted musicians of a high calibre including Dart, Iona Brown, Christopher Hogwood and Alan Loveday. Marriner recorded prolifically with the academy. The first recordings in the early 1960s, with Marriner both conducting and playing lead violin, were successful, leading Pierre Monteux, then the LSO's conductor, to encourage Marriner to shift his focus to conducting. Marriner had studied the subject with Monteux at his school in Hancock, Maine, in the United States, from around 1950.

Marriner was the founder and first music director of the Los Angeles Chamber Orchestra, from 1969 to 1978. From 1979 to 1986, he was music director of the Minnesota Orchestra. He was principal conductor of the Stuttgart Radio Symphony Orchestra from 1983 to 1989. Except for 1974 to 1980 during which Iona Brown was the director, he remained the musical director of the Academy of St Martin in the Fields until 2011, when he was succeeded by Joshua Bell, continuing to hold the title of Life President until his death. He also conducted many other orchestras, including the New York Chamber Orchestra, Gulbenkian Orchestra, Israel Chamber Orchestra, Australian Chamber Orchestra and Vienna Philharmonic. He continued to conduct into his nineties, becoming the oldest conductor of a Proms concert in 2014, aged 90.

His obituary in The Telegraph praises the Academy of St Martin in the Fields' interpretations of baroque and classical music as "fresh, technically brilliant", and describes them as a "revelation". Marriner preferred modern instruments and effects, and his work came under criticism by Hogwood, among others, for not striving for an "authentic" sound. He later expanded the academy's repertoire to include Romantic and early-modern music.

Marriner made over 600 recordings covering 2,000 different works – more than any conductor except Herbert von Karajan. He recorded for various labels, including Argo, L'Oiseau Lyre, Philips and EMI Classics. His recorded repertoire ranges from the baroque era to 20th-century British music, as well as opera. He supervised the Mozart selections for the soundtrack of the Oscar-winning 1984 film Amadeus; it became one of the most popular classical music recordings of all time, selling over 6.5 million copies.

Marriner's final recording was completed just a few days before his death, the Mozart Piano Concerto No. 21 with Yeol Eum Son as soloist. His partnership with the Academy of St Martin in the Fields is the most recorded of any orchestra and conductor.

== Personal life and death ==
Marriner was married twice. His first wife was cellist (and later, antiquarian bookseller) Diana Carbutt, whom he married in 1949. They had two children - Susie, a writer; and Andrew, a clarinettist who often worked with his father and who was the principal clarinet of the London Symphony Orchestra for many years. The first marriage was dissolved in 1956. His second wife was Elizabeth Mary "Molly" Sims, whom he married in 1957.

He lived in London and in later life had a second home near Chardstock in Devon. Asked for an epitaph for his gravestone, he replied simply: "Follow the beat." Marriner died from heart failure on 2 October 2016, at the age of 92, at his home in London.

== Centenary ==
In April 2024 the academy marked the centenary of its founder's birth with concerts in St Martin-in-the-Fields church, the Wigmore Hall, the Royal Festival Hall and Lincoln Cathedral (the city of his birth). The Marriner 100 programme commenced on 15 April, the actual centenary day, with a concert at the orchestra's spiritual home, St Martin-in-the-Fields, directed/conducted by leader Tomo Keller, music director Joshua Bell and former academy flautist Jaime Martin, in which former members of the Academy Chorus, who had sung under Marriner, performed a suite from Die Schöpfung. BBC Radio 3 broadcast the concert as the climax of its Neville Marriner Day, with all its programmes devoted to his life, work and legacy. A month long centenary exhibition was held in the church.

On 14 April BBC Four broadcast Sir Neville Marriner at the Proms: Mendelssohn's Italian Symphony, from 1983, and Sir Neville Marriner: Schubert's Symphony No 10, from 1988, both with the Academy of St Martin-in-the-Fields. On 15 April BBC Radio 3 broadcast "Neville Marriner Day".

== Honours and awards ==
Described as "one of the world's greatest conductors", Gramophone lists Marriner as one of the 50 greatest conductors and another compilation ranks Marriner number 14 of the 18 "Greatest and Most Famous Conductors of All Time". He founded the Academy of St Martin in the Fields, and his partnership with them is the most recorded of any orchestra and conductor.

Marriner was appointed a Commander of the Order of the British Empire (CBE) in 1979. He was created a Knight Bachelor in 1985. In 1990 the Hamburg-based Alfred Toepfer Foundation awarded Marriner its annual Shakespeare Prize in recognition of his life's work. In the 2015 Queen's Birthday Honours, he was appointed a Member of the Order of the Companions of Honour (CH). He was appointed an officer of the French Ordre des Arts et des Lettres. His recordings of Mozart were honoured with two Gemeinde Awards from the Austrian Music Academy.

Marriner won three Grammy Awards for his recordings of Haydn's The Creation (1982), the soundtrack for Amadeus (1985) and violin concertos by Brahms and Stravinsky (2003). He also received a total of 9 nominations.

== Discography ==
Composer	Title	Other Artists (Marriner as conductor)	Year	Label
Handel	Concerti grossi, Op. 3	Academy of St. Martin in the Fields	1964	Argo
Various	Recital for Strings	Academy of St. Martin in the Fields	1965	Argo
Various	Italian Concertos	Roger Lord (clarinet), Barry Tuckwell (horn), Kenneth Heath (cello), Academy of St. Martin in the Fields	1965	Argo
Various	18th Century Flute Concertos	Claude Monteux (flute), Academy of St. Martin in the Fields	1965	L'Oiseau-Lyre
Handel	Concertos for Oboe	Roger Lord (clarinet), Academy of St. Martin in the Fields	1965	L'Oiseau-Lyre
Vivaldi / Pergolesi	Gloria & Magnificat	Elizabeth Vaughan (soprano), Janet Baker (contralto), Ian Partridge (tenor), Christopher Keyte (bass), Choir of King's College, Cambridge, Academy of St. Martin in the Fields	1966	Argo
Various	Concertos for Recorders and Strings	Bernard Krainis (recorder), Academy of St. Martin in the Fields	1966	Mercury Living Presence
Bach	Cantatas BWV 159 & 170	Janet Baker (contralto), Robert Tear (tenor), John Shirley-Quirk (bass), Academy of St. Martin in the Fields	1966	L'Oiseau-Lyre
Bach	Cantatas BWV 56 & 82	John Shirley-Quirk (bass), St. Anthony Singers, Academy of St. Martin in the Fields	1966	L'Oiseau-Lyre
Mendelssohn	String Symphonies Nos. 9, 10 & 12	Academy of St. Martin in the Fields	1966	Argo
Haydn	Concertos for Horn	Barry Tuckwell (horn), Academy of St. Martin in the Fields	1966	Argo
Rossini	String Sonatas	Academy of St. Martin in the Fields	1967	Argo
J. Haydn / M. Haydn	Trumpet Concerto / Horn Concerto	Alan Stringer (trumpet), Barry Tuckwell (horn), Academy of St. Martin in the Fields	1967	Argo
Handel	Arias	Forbes Robinson (bass), Academy of St. Martin in the Fields	1967	Argo
Stravinsky	Pulcinella / Apollon Musagète	Academy of St. Martin in the Fields	1968	Argo
Mozart / Haydn	Piano Concerto No. 9 / Piano Concerto in D	Igor Kipnis (harpsichord), Academy of St. Martin in the Fields	1968	Columbia Masterworks
Handel	Concerti grossi, Op. 6	Academy of St. Martin in the Fields	1968	Decca
Gluck	Don Juan	Academy of St. Martin in the Fields	1968	Decca
Arne / C.P.E. Bach	Concerto in C minor / Concerto in G minor	George Malcolm (harpsichord), Academy of St. Martin in the Fields	1968	Argo
Mozart	Three Divertimenti for Strings / Serenata Notturna	Academy of St. Martin in the Fields	1968	Argo
Elgar	Introduction and Allegro / Sospiri / Elegy / Dances from The Spanish Lady	Academy of St. Martin in the Fields	1968	Argo
Various	Baroque Trumpet Concertos	John Wilbraham (trumpet), Academy of St. Martin in the Fields	1969	Argo
Strauss / Wagner	Metamorphosen / Siegfried Idyll	Academy of St. Martin in the Fields	1969	Argo
Rossini / Donizetti	String Sonatas Nos. 2 & 4 / String Quartet in D	Academy of St. Martin in the Fields	1969	Argo
Tchaikovsky	Serenade for Strings / Souvenir de Florence	Academy of St. Martin in the Fields	1969	Argo
Various	Baroque Trumpet Anthology	Don Smithers (trumpet), Michael Laird (trumpet), Academy of St. Martin in the Fields	1970	Philips
Haydn	Symphonies Nos. 52 & 53 "L'Impériale"	Academy of St. Martin in the Fields	1970	Philips
M. Haydn / J. Haydn	Duo Concertante for Viola and Organ / Organ Concerto in C major	Simon Preston (organ), Stephen Shingles (viola), Academy of St. Martin in the Fields	1970	Argo
Bartók	Music for Strings, Percussion and Celesta / Divertimento	Leslie Pearson (celesta), Academy of St. Martin in the Fields	1970	Argo
Britten	Saint Nicolas	Robert Tear (tenor), King's College Choir, Cambridge, Academy of St. Martin in the Fields	1970	EMI
Elgar	The Lighter Elgar	Northern Sinfonia	1970	EMI
J.C. Bach	Six Symphonies, Op. 3	Academy of St. Martin in the Fields	1970	Philips
Various	Strings & Brass	John Wilbraham (trumpet), Philip Jones Brass Ensemble, Academy of St. Martin in the Fields	1970	Argo
Dvořák / Grieg	Serenade for Strings / Holberg Suite	Academy of St. Martin in the Fields	1970	Argo
Mendelssohn	Piano Concertos	Brenda Lucas (piano), Academy of St. Martin in the Fields	1970	Argo
Vivaldi	The Four Seasons	Alan Loveday (violin), Academy of St. Martin in the Fields	1970	Argo
Britten	Serenade for Tenor, Horn and Strings • Les Illuminations	Heather Harper (soprano), Robert Tear (tenor), Alan Civil (horn), Northern Sinfonia	1971	Angel Records
Mozart	Symphonies Nos. 35 "Haffner" & 40 / March, K. 408, No. 2	Academy of St. Martin in the Fields	1971	Philips
Bach	Brandenburg Concertos	Thurston Dart (harpsichord and arranger), Academy of St. Martin in the Fields	1971	Philips
Various	Living Baroque	Don Smithers (trumpet), John Wilbraham (trumpet), Carmel Kaine (violin), Academy of St. Martin in the Fields	1971	Philips
Mozart	Eine kleine Nachtmusik / Sinfonia Concertante	Alan Loveday (violin), Stephen Shingles (viola), Academy of St. Martin in the Fields	1971	Argo
Bach	Suites for Orchestra	William Bennett (flute), Thurston Dart (harpsichord), Academy of St. Martin in the Fields	1971	Argo
Various	Trumpet Concerti	John Wilbraham (trumpet), Academy of St. Martin in the Fields	1971	Argo
Various	Academy '72	Barry Tuckwell (horn), Josef Suk (violin), Academy of St. Martin in the Fields	1972	EMI
Mozart	Exsultate Jubilate	Erna Spoorenberg (soprano), Academy of St. Martin in the Fields	1972	Argo
Shostakovich / Stravinsky	Concerto for Piano, Trumpet and Strings / Capriccio	John Ogdon (piano), John Wilbraham (trumpet), Academy of St. Martin in the Fields	1972	Argo
Mozart	Clarinet Concerto / Bassoon Concerto / Andante for Flute	Jack Brymer (clarinet), Michael Chapman (bassoon), Claude Monteux (flute), Academy of St. Martin in the Fields	1972	Philips
Handel	Ballet Music	Academy of St. Martin in the Fields	1972	Argo
Mozart	Concerto for Flute and Harp / Sinfonia Concertante, K. 297b	Claude Monteux (flute), Osian Ellis (harp), Academy of St. Martin in the Fields	1972	Philips
Bach	The Complete Harpsichord Concertos	Igor Kipnis (harpsichord), Academy of St. Martin in the Fields	1972	CBS
Various	English String Music	Academy of St. Martin in the Fields	1972	EMI
Mozart	Piano Concertos Nos. 19 & 23	Alfred Brendel (piano), Academy of St. Martin in the Fields	1972	Philips
Mozart	Overtures and Ballet Music	Academy of St. Martin in the Fields	1972	EMI
Mozart	Coronation Mass / Litaniae Lauretanae BMV, K. 195	Ileana Cotrubaș (soprano), Helen Watts (contralto), Robert Tear (tenor), John Shirley-Quirk (bass), Schola Cantorum of Oxford, Academy of St. Martin in the Fields	1972	Argo
Mozart	Piano Concertos Nos. 12 & 17	Alfred Brendel (piano), Academy of St. Martin in the Fields	1972	Philips
Mozart	Symphonies Nos. 29 & 25	Academy of St. Martin in the Fields	1972	Argo
Vaughan Williams	Fantasia on a Theme by Thomas Tallis / The Lark Ascending / Five Variants of Dives and Lazarus / Fantasia on Greensleeves	Academy of St. Martin in the Fields	1972	Argo
Mozart	Divertimento in D, K. 334 / Notturno for Four Orchestras	Academy of St. Martin in the Fields	1972	Argo
Mozart	The Horn Concertos	Barry Tuckwell (horn), Academy of St. Martin in the Fields	1972	EMI
Mozart	The 4 Horn Concertos	Alan Civil (horn), Academy of St. Martin in the Fields	1972	Philips
Tippett	Little Music for String Orchestra / Concerto for Double String Orchestra / Fantasia Concertante on a Theme of Corelli	Academy of St. Martin in the Fields	1972	Argo
Handel	Music for the Royal Fireworks / Water Music	Academy of St. Martin in the Fields	1972	Argo
Mozart	The Symphonies, Vol. 1	Academy of St. Martin in the Fields	1972	Decca
Handel / Mozart / Rossini	Meister der Musik	Academy of St. Martin in the Fields	1972	Decca
Mahler / Britten	Lieder Eines Fahrenden Gesellen / Nocturne	Robert Tear (tenor), Academy of St. Martin in the Fields	1973	Argo
Mozart	Violin Concerto in G, K. 216 / Concertone for 2 Violins, K. 190	Alan Loveday (violin), Carmel Kaine (violin), Iona Brown (violin), Kenneth Heath (cello), Tess Miller (oboe), Academy of St. Martin in the Fields	1973	Decca
Bizet / Prokofiev	Symphony in C / Classical Symphony	Academy of St. Martin in the Fields	1973	Argo
Bach	Cantatas BWV 202 & 209	Elly Ameling (soprano), Academy of St. Martin in the Fields	1973	EMI
Walton / Prokofiev	Sonata for Strings / Visions Fugitives	Academy of St. Martin in the Fields	1973	Argo
Mozart	Flute Concerto, K. 313 / Oboe Concerto, K. 314	Claude Monteux (flute), Neil Black (oboe), Academy of St. Martin in the Fields	1973	Philips
Mozart	The Early Symphonies	Academy of St. Martin in the Fields	1973	Philips
Vivaldi	L'estro armonico	Alan Loveday (violin), Carmel Kaine (violin), Iona Brown (violin), Academy of St. Martin in the Fields	1973	Argo
Tchaikovsky / Dvořák	Serenades for Strings	Academy of St. Martin in the Fields	1973	Argo
Rossini	Famous Overtures	Academy of St. Martin in the Fields	1974	Philips
Various	Munrow & Marriner	David Munrow (treble recorder), Academy of St. Martin in the Fields	1974	EMI
Schoenberg / Webern / Hindemith	Verklärte Nacht, Op. 4 / Fünf Sätze, Op. 4 / Fünf Stücke, Op. 44, No. 4	Los Angeles Chamber Orchestra	1974	Argo
Mozart	Piano Concertos Nos. 20 & 23	Alfred Brendel (piano), Academy of St. Martin in the Fields	1974	Philips
Corelli	Concerti grossi, Op. 6	Academy of St. Martin in the Fields	1974	Argo
Various	The Academy in Concert	Academy of St. Martin in the Fields	1974	EMI
Various	Six Concertos for Trumpet	Maurice André (trumpet), Academy of St. Martin in the Fields	1974	Erato
Corelli	Christmas Concerto	Academy of St. Martin in the Fields	1974	Argo
Suk / Strauss / Janáček	Serenade for Strings / Sextet from "Capriccio" / Suite for String Orchestra	Academy of St. Martin in the Fields	1975	Argo
J.C. Bach / Haydn	Harpsichord Concerto in A / Harpsichord Concerto in D / Overture in D	George Malcolm (harpsichord), Academy of St. Martin in the Fields	1975 (recorded in 1969	Decca
Rodrigo	Concierto Madrigal / Fantasía Para un Gentilhombre	Pepe Romero (guitar), Ángel Romero (guitar), Academy of St. Martin in the Fields	1975	Philips
Mozart	Piano Concertos Nos. 27 & 18	Alfred Brendel (piano), Academy of St. Martin in the Fields	1975	Philips
Bach	Concerto for Three Violins / Concerto for Violin and Oboe / Concerto for Flute	William Bennett (flute), Tess Miller (oboe), Carmel Kaine (violin), Richard Studt (violin), Ronald Thomas (violin), Academy of St. Martin in the Fields	1975	Argo
Stravinsky	Concerto in D / Danses Concertantes / Dumbarton Oaks	Los Angeles Chamber Orchestra	1975	EMI
Vivaldi	La Stravaganza, Op. 4	Carmel Kaine (violin), Alan Loveday (violin), Academy of St. Martin in the Fields	1975	Argo
Bach	The Art of Fugue	Academy of St. Martin in the Fields	1975	Philips
Mendelssohn	Piano Concertos Nos. 1 & 2	Murray Perahia (piano), Academy of St. Martin in the Fields	1975	Columbia Masterworks
Beethoven	Symphony No. 4 / Grosse Fuge	Academy of St. Martin in the Fields	1975	Philips
Haydn	12 Name Symphonies	Academy of St. Martin in the Fields	1976	Philips
Various	A Festival of English Music	Academy of St. Martin in the Fields	1976	Argo
Haydn	Symphonies Nos. 48 "Maria Theresa" & 85 "La Reine"	Academy of St. Martin in the Fields	1976	Philips
Various	Music for Double Bass	Rodney Slatford (double bass), Academy of St. Martin in the Fields	1976	EMI
Handel	Complete Organ Concertos	George Malcolm (organ), Academy of St. Martin in the Fields	1976	Argo
Haydn	Symphonies Nos. 43 "Mercury" & 59 "Fire"	Academy of St. Martin in the Fields	1976	Philips
Handel	Messiah	Elly Ameling (soprano), Anna Reynolds (contralto), Philip Langridge (tenor), Gwynne Howell (bass), Academy and Chorus of St. Martin in the Fields	1976	Argo
Telemann	Don Quichotte / Viola Concerto / Overture in D	Stephen Shingles (viola), Academy of St. Martin in the Fields	1976	Argo
Barber / Ives / Copland	Adagio for Strings / Symphony No. 3 / Quite City	Academy of St. Martin in the Fields	1976	Argo
Haydn	Symphonies Nos. 44 "Mourning" & 49 "La Passione"	Academy of St. Martin in the Fields	1976	Philips
Handel	Two Double Concertos ("A Due Cori")	Academy of St. Martin in the Fields	1976	EMI
Respighi	Ancient Airs and Dances	Los Angeles Chamber Orchestra	1976	Angel Records
Bach	Arias from Cantatas and Oratorios	Janet Baker (contralto), Academy of St. Martin in the Fields	1976	EMI
Mozart	Piano Concerto No. 22 / Concert Rondos K. 382 & 386	Alfred Brendel (piano), Academy of St. Martin in the Fields	1976	Philips
Bach	Violin Concertos	Henryk Szeryng (violin), Academy of St. Martin in the Fields	1976	Philips
Butterworth / Britten	A Shropshire Lad / Two English Idylls / The Banks of Green Willow / Variations on a Theme of Frank Bridge	Academy of St. Martin in the Fields	1976	Argo
Haydn	Symphonies Nos. 100 "Military" & 103 "Drum Roll"	Academy of St. Martin in the Fields	1976	Philips
Vivaldi	Concerti for Wind and Strings, Vol. 1	Academy of St. Martin in the Fields	1977	Argo
Vivaldi	Concerti for Wind and Strings, Vol. 2	Academy of St. Martin in the Fields	1977	Argo
Mozart	Piano Concerto No.21 K467 / Sonata No.10 K330	Yeol Eum Son (piano), Academy of St. Martin in the Fields	2018 (final recording)	Onyx Classics

Look at CD: PHILIPS 456 662-2 SOLO Franz von Suppe "The famous overtures" London Philharmonic Orchestra Alexander Cameron, cello solo in "Poet and Peasant"
