= Robin Ticciati =

British conductor of Italian ancestry (born 1983)

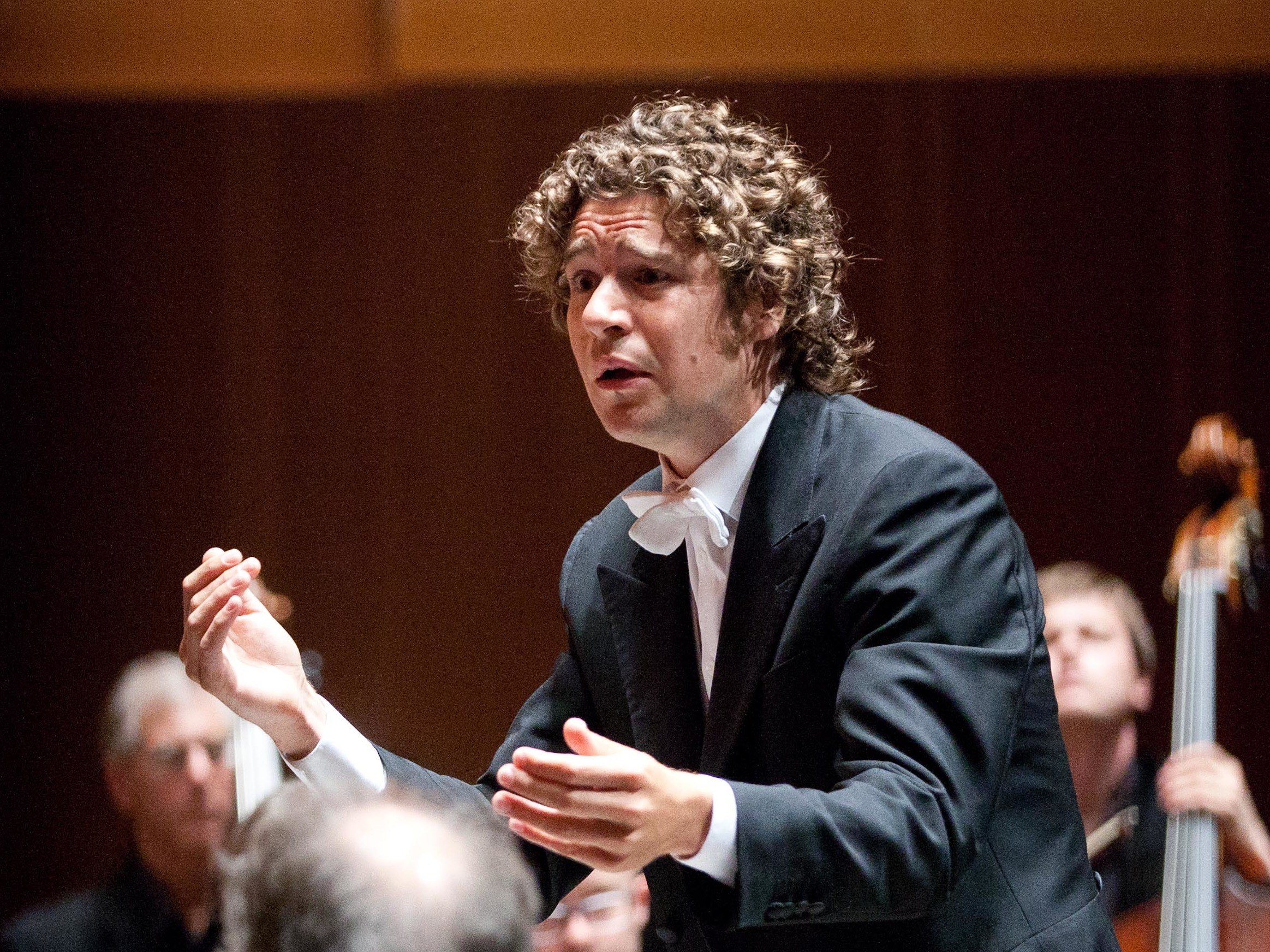
Robin Ticciati, 2013

Robin Ticciati OBE (born 16 April 1983, in London) is a British conductor of Italian ancestry.

== Biography ==
Ticciati's paternal great-grandfather, Francesco Ticciati, was an Italian-born composer and pianist who became a British citizen in 1936. He played at the Proms eight times in the 1920s. Ticciati's paternal grandfather, Niso Ticciati, was a composer, arranger, cellist, and keyboardist. His father is a barrister, and his mother is a therapist. His older brother Hugo Ticciati is a violinist, and his sister is a theology professor.

As a youth, Ticciati studied violin, piano and percussion, and was a member of the National Youth Orchestra of Great Britain. He began conducting at age 15 whilst attending St Paul's School. Ticciati read music at Clare College, University of Cambridge. Although Ticciati has not had any formal conducting training, he counts Sir Simon Rattle and Sir Colin Davis among his conducting mentors.

Ticciati founded the chamber ensemble Aurora, which gave its first concert in April 2005, the year in which he was also awarded a Borletti Buitoni Trust Fellowship. In June 2005 he was called to substitute for Riccardo Muti for a night at the Teatro alla Scala, thus becoming its youngest conductor ever. In January 2006, Ticciati became artistic advisor and chief conductor of the Gävle Symphony Orchestra, and concluded his Gävle tenure in May 2009. In 2007, Ticciati became music director of Glyndebourne on Tour, and held the post until December 2009.

Ticciati conducted the Scottish Chamber Orchestra (SCO) for the first time at Strathpeffer Pavilion, at the start of a summer 2008 Highlands concert tour. In October 2008, the SCO announced the appointment of Ticciati as the orchestra's next principal conductor, effective as of the 2009–2010 season. In October 2010, the SCO announced the extension of Ticciati's contract as principal conductor for an additional 3 years, through the 2014–2015 season. In March 2013, the SCO further extended Ticciati's contract as principal conductor to 2018. He concluded his SCO tenure at the close of the 2017–2018 season. In July 2011, Ticciati was announced as the seventh music director of Glyndebourne Festival Opera, effective January 2014, the first former music director of Glyndebourne on Tour to be named music director of the full Glyndebourne Opera company.

Outside of the UK, Ticciati served as principal guest conductor of the Bamberg Symphony from 2010 to 2013. He first guest-conducted the Deutsches Symphonie-Orchester Berlin (DSO Berlin) in October 2014. In October 2015, the DSO Berlin named Ticciati its next principal conductor, effective with the 2017–2018 season, with an initial contract of 5 years. In September 2020, the DSO Berlin announced the extension of Ticciati's contract through 2027. A March 2023 news report indicated that Ticciati is to stand down from the DSO Berlin in 2025, two years ahead of his previously announced contract extension.

Ticciati and the SCO have recorded commercially for Linn Records, as Les Nuits d'été, La mort de Cléopâtre, Symphonie Fantastique and L'Enfance du Christ, Roméo et Juliette, (with the Swedish Radio Symphony Orchestra & Swedish Radio Chor), by Berlioz. Ticciati received an Honorary Doctorate from Heriot-Watt University in 2012.

Ticciati was appointed Officer of the Order of the British Empire (OBE) in the 2019 Birthday Honours for services to music.

Cultural offices
| Preceded by Petri Sakari | Chief Conductor, Gävle Symphony Orchestra; 2006-2009 | Succeeded by Jaime Martín |
| Preceded by Edward Gardner | Music Director, Glyndebourne on Tour; 2007-2009 | Succeeded by Jakub Hrůša |
| Preceded by Joseph Swensen | Principal Conductor, Scottish Chamber Orchestra; 2009-2018 | Succeeded by Maxim Emelyanychev |
| Preceded by Vladimir Jurowski | Music Director, Glyndebourne Festival Opera; 2014-present | Succeeded by incumbent |
| Preceded by Tugan Sokhiev | Principal Conductor, Deutsches Symphonie-Orchester Berlin; 2017-2024 | Succeeded by Kazuki Yamada |
