= Jeffrey Crellin =

Australian oboist

Jeffrey Crellin is an Australian oboist, who was principal of the Melbourne Symphony Orchestra (MSO) from 1977 to 2021. He was also the founder and Artistic Director of Australia Pro Arte from 1990 to 2006, a Melbourne-based chamber orchestra that later changed its name to the Melbourne Chamber Orchestra. Crellin is also a faculty member at the Australian National Academy of Music (ANAM).

Jeffrey Crellin was born in Brisbane, Queensland, and first studied the oboe with Frank Lockwood at the Queensland Conservatorium of Music (also piano with Max Olding), and then with Jiří Tancibudek at the University of Adelaide. In 1973 he was the overall winner of the ABC Instrumental and Vocal Competitions, after which he travelled to Europe to study, most significantly with Heinz Holliger in Germany for two years on a Churchill Fellowship. There he won first prize in the Freiburg Musikhochschule Oboe Competition.

There was a time when Crellin's career might have taken a very different turn: "I had plans to move careers to opera singing at one point in my late twenties. I had sung professionally as a boy soprano with the Australian Opera and with JC Williamsons in Her Majesty's Theatre Brisbane in 1967, singing the shepherd boy in Tosca and being one of the urchins in Oliver. I continued that interest studying singing in Adelaide and Germany, and commenced studies again with Dame Joan Hammond at the VCA in 1978. I was already principal oboe with the MSO at that time, so it would have been quite a shift had I ultimately pursued that course."

Crellin's recordings include Distance and Entretemps by Japanese composer Toru Takemitsu with the Arditti Quartet, Ric Formosa’s Dedica (written especially for Crellin) with Patrick Thomas and the Melbourne Symphony Orchestra, Vers L’arc-en-ciel Palma by Toru Takemitsu with guitarist Norio Sato, conductor Hiroyuki Iwaki and the Melbourne Symphony Orchestra for ABC Classics, Images with flautist Prudence Davis and guitarist Peter Lynch, and Pictures at an Exhibition as soloist and conductor with the Australia Pro Arte Chamber Orchestra for Move records.

Jeffrey is also an accomplished conductor, and in this role has appeared with the MSO, the Adelaide Chamber Orchestra, the Queensland Philharmonic Orchestra, the Christchurch Symphony Orchestra, the Geminiani Chamber Orchestra, the Royal Philharmonic Choir, and Australia Pro Arte. In 2014 Crellin was a presenter and performer at the Australian Double Reed Society (ADRS) National Conference held in Melbourne.

Crellin is married to Prudence Davis, principal flautist of the MSO, and they have two sons. Jeffrey's brother Keith Crellin is an accomplished violist who was a founding member of the Australian String Quartet.
