= Gävle Symphony Orchestra =

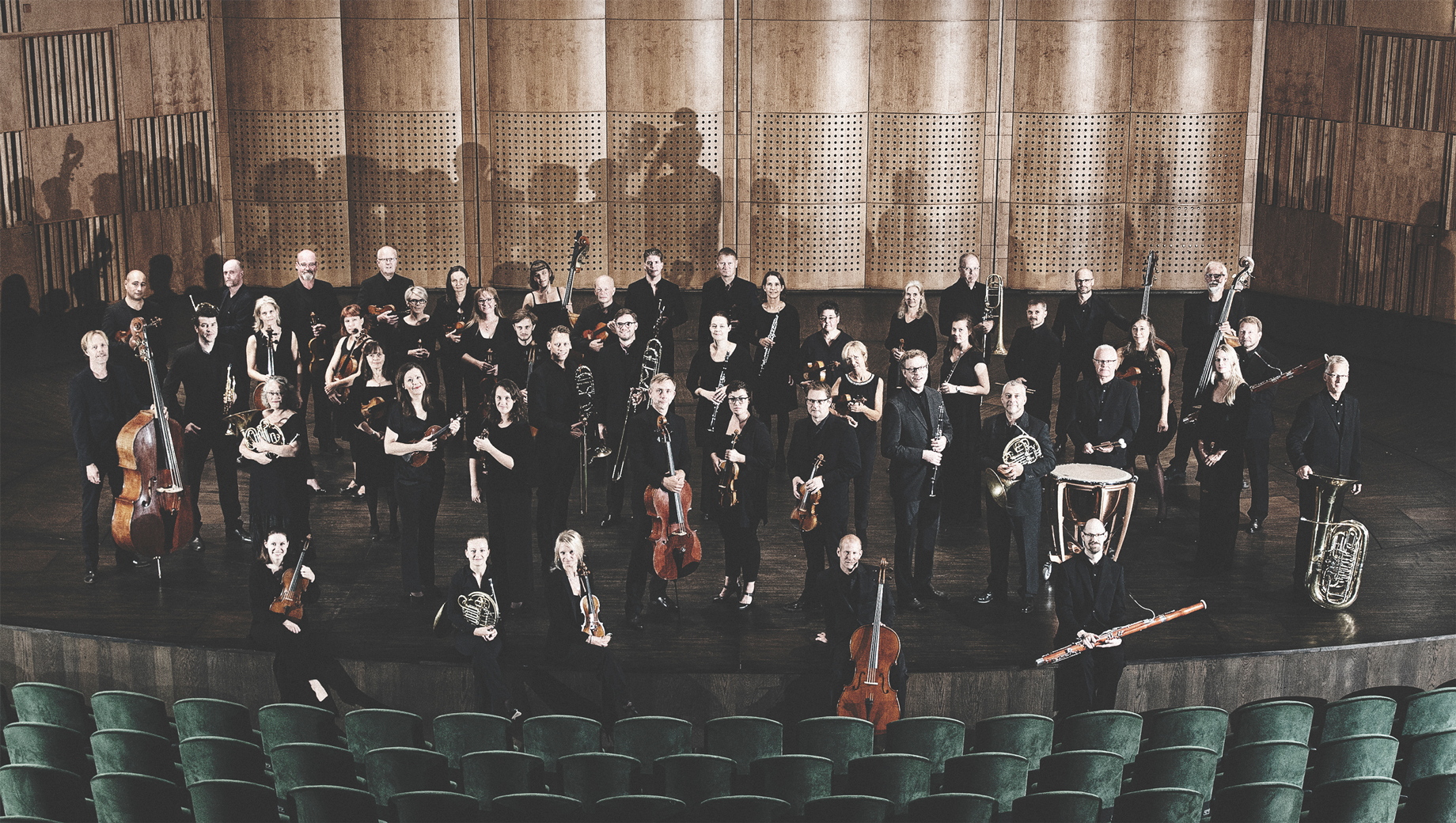
- At Gävle Concert Hall in 2018

Background information
- Years active: 1912–present

The Gävle Symphony Orchestra (Swedish: Gävle symfoniorkester) is a symphony orchestra based in Gävle, Sweden. The orchestra is resident at the Gävle Konserthus (Gävle Concert Hall).

== History ==
Founded in 1912, giving its first concert on 16 January that year, the orchestra initially gave its concerts in the Gävle theatre and Mariners' Church. In 1998, a purpose-built concert hall was constructed overlooking the Gavleån.

Beginning on 1 July 2012, Jaime Martín became the orchestra's artistic adviser, and on 1 July 2013, he took the post of principal conductor. His initial contract was for 4 years. In September 2015, the orchestra extended his contract through 2020. Martín had been scheduled to conclude his tenure as principal conductor of the orchestra at the close of the 2020-2021 season. However, in the wake of the COVID-19 pandemic, the orchestra and Martín extended the scheduled date of the conclusion of his tenure by one year, into 2022. Martín stood down as principal conductor at the close of the 2021-2022 season.

In December 2021, Christian Reif first guest-conducted the orchestra. In April 2023, the orchestra announced the appointment of Reif as its chief conductor, effective with the 2023-2024 season, with an initial contract of three seasons.

Among its discography are recordings of Tre Dalmålningar by Oskar Lindberg, Xaver Scharwenka's Symphony in C minor, symphonic poems by Franz Berwald; orchestral works by Gustaf Bengtsson, Oscar Byström's Symphony in D minor, Jacob Adolf Hägg's Nordic Symphony; orchestral music by Armas Järnefelt, Otto Olsson's Symphony in G minor, Kurt Atterberg's violin and piano concertos; a concert live from the Amsterdam Concertgebouw with works by Grieg, Svendsen and Shostakovich with Carlos Spierer, Rosa Arnold, Enrica Ciccarelli, and the piano concerto of Sven-David Sandström.

== Principal conductors ==
- Ruben Liljefors (1912–1931)
- Ludvig Mowinckel (1931–1934)
- Sten Frykberg (1934–1939)
- Sixten Eckerberg (1936)
- Eric Bengtson (1939–1948)
- Stig Westerberg (1949–1953)
- Siegfried Naumann (1953–1954)
- Gunnar Staern (1954–1963)
- Carl Rune Larsson (1963–1967)
- Rainer Miedel (1968–1975)
- Göran W Nilson (1981–1984)
- Doron Salomon (1984–1990)
- Hannu Koivula (1991–1996)
- Carlos Spierer (1997–2000)
- Petri Sakari (2000–2006)
- Robin Ticciati (2006–2009)
- Jaime Martín (2013–2022)
- Christian Reif (2023–present)
