= Ian Keith Harris =

Australian composer

Ian Keith Harris

Ian Keith Harris (24 June 1936 – 3 April 2024) was an Australian composer of classical music, arranger, oboist, critic and music educator.

== Life and career ==
Ian Keith Harris was born in Melbourne, living there for the first 26 years of his life. He started the piano at the age of five, playing cornet in his school band, then violin for a couple of years at high school, and later was a school pianist. In 1952, he began his Bachelor of Music degree at Melbourne University Conservatorium of Music, taking piano as chief study and oboe as second. Later, he changed to oboe as his chief study and studied composition with Jiři Tancibudek and Arthur Nickson.

He was soon in demand as a freelance orchestral musician, arranger and copyist, working in an eclectic mix of musical spheres from arrangement for television and various theatrical shows to playing in opera, ballet, chamber music and symphony orchestras. He was a founding member of the Glendenian Trio (flute, oboe, bassoon), which gave regular broadcasts over several years. The trio was another area in which his arrangement skills were frequently employed.

He served some years as an oboist for J. C. Williamson theatres, playing musicals, opera, and several Gilbert and Sullivan Opera seasons, several ballet seasons (Borovansky Ballet), Australian tours of the Royal Covent Garden Ballet, and the American Ballet Company, and as a copyist / arranger with GTV channel 9. In 1961 Ian Harris moved to Hobart, Tasmania (Tasmanian Symphony Orchestra), was seconded to the Sydney Symphony Orchestra (cor anglais) for several months, returned to Tasmania only to be seconded again 1964, this time to the Victorian Symphony Orchestra (oboe). Back again in Tasmania, his next move was to Wellington, New Zealand (1965–1974) to join NZBCSO (the New Zealand Broadcasting Corporation Symphony Orchestra) as Principal Cor anglais.

Harris tutored at the universities of Tasmania, Melbourne, and the Victoria University of Wellington. He was deeply committed to music education and also conducted the Tasmanian Junior Youth Orchestra for several years. He completed his degree in composition at the Victoria University of Wellington (with David Farquhar) in 1969.

Harris was a dedicated member of ALP policy committees, especially in Education and the Arts and served as music critic for The Mercury, Hobart's daily newspaper, for several years.

Ian Harris moved back to Sydney in 2000, where he devoted himself to composition. He died at Gosford Hospital in New South Wales on 3 April 2024, at the age of 88.

== Works ==
His oeuvre consists mainly of chamber music, much of which has been performed and broadcast: Microsymphony for Cor anglais Quartet (cor anglais, string trio), Oboe Quartet (oboe, string trio), Essay for Bassoon and Strings, Sonata for Viola and Piano, amongst many other pieces and numerous arrangements for broadcasts and concerts.

Ian Harris wrote many works for the oboe d’amore, an instrument he loved and the specialty of Jennifer Paull, whose life mission has been to create a modern repertoire for this baroque instrument. He composed fifteen original works for her as well as transcribing and realizing others from the Baroque period. His contribution to the double reed repertoire and to the oboe d'amore, particularly, is very important. It sets him apart as the composer who wrote most for this instrument in contemporary times.

His sense of fun has shown in many of his compositions, including, A Piece with Strawberry Jam, The Little Dog's Day (Rupert Brooke), Paw de trois, a Pas de trois for an Imaginary Canine Ballet (for Wind Quintet, with movements dedicated to his dogs by name), The Whitebait Fishers "A sort of Donizetti-like spoof for harpsichord, string quartet and small choir, for which the producer of the hour-long national radio show penned the libretto for this, a special anniversary broadcast of the programme."

Harris orchestrated songs for symphony concerts, including a version of The Last Rose of Summer for Rita Streich (1920–1987), and did an arrangement for Eartha Kitt. He also wrote, directed and even performed in advertising jingles, playing celesta, oboe, cor anglais.
