= The Olympians =

1945 opera in three acts by Arthur Bliss

The Olympians is an opera in three acts by Arthur Bliss to a libretto by J. B. Priestley, first performed at the Royal Opera House, Covent Garden on 29 September 1949, conducted by Karl Rankl in a production by Peter Brook.

After the initial run the next performance was in concert on 21 February 1972 at the Royal Festival Hall, London, conducted by Bryan Fairfax, which was also broadcast by BBC radio.

== Background ==
Bliss and Priestley had first met at a music party in the late 1920s. As they lived close to each other in Hampstead, for a few years subsequently they met, played tennis and dined together. Towards the end of the Second World War, Priestley again met Bliss, who said he was ready to write an opera, and asked the author for suggestions. Priestley found in his notebooks an idea for a story about the legend of gods becoming strolling players. He enjoyed a good collaboration with the composer, only meeting three or four times and otherwise corresponding about the opera. Bliss insisted on irregular lines to set.

In 1972 Priestley reflected that to describe the first night as under-rehearsed was one of the "understatements of the last half-century". He claimed that Rankl had not taken the score away for the summer to study and that Rankl and Brook were not on speaking terms and communicated by passing notes between them. There was also insufficient rehearsal time: the first act was well rehearsed, Act 2 was barely adequate, and the third was like "charades". The ballet – intended for the Royal Ballet dancers – had to use junior dancers as the main company was away on tour.

In a letter to Bliss (quoted in As I Remember), E.J. Dent, while noting "Lavatte's familiarity with The Bartered Bride", praised the music of Acts I and III, while feeling that the entrances of the gods in Act II "weak". Dent nonetheless lauded the "masterly" orchestration and the opportunities for singers to show their voices off.

== Roles ==
Role	Voice type	Premiere Cast, 29 September 1949 (Conductor: Karl Rankl)
The curé	tenor	Murray Dickie
Madame Bardeau	mezzo-soprano	Edith Coates
Jean	baritone	Ronald Lewis
Joseph Lavatte	bass	Howell Glynne
Hector de Florac	tenor	James Johnston
Madeline	soprano	Shirley Russell
Alfred	tenor	Rhydderch Davies
Mercury	dancer	Robert Helpmann
Venus	mime	Moyra Fraser
Bacchus	tenor	Thorstenn Hannesson
Mars	bass	David Franklin
Diana	soprano	Margherita Grandi
Jupiter	baritone	Kenneth Schon
Chorus: Villagers, guests, servants

== Synopsis ==
Legend has it that when men ceased to believe in the Gods of Olympus, some of the gods became a group of strolling players, walking through Europe over the centuries. Once every 100 years however, at midsummer, these players find themselves again with their divine powers.

Time: 1836, at midsummer

Setting: Berasson, a small town in the south of France

=== Act 1 ===
A large room at the Golden Duck tavern
After bustle of travellers departing, Madame Bardeau is seen entertaining the curé. She owes money to Lavatte, the richest (and meanest) man in the town. While explaining all this, she sees a porter loading luggage belonging to a group of strolling players who owe her money. The curé agrees to intercede with Lavatte if she will be generous with the players. Lavatte enters and announces that he is giving a party that night to mark the engagement of his daughter Madeleine to a local nobleman (who it turns out is too old to become her husband). The curé suggests that Lavatte gets the players to entertain his guests that night – they will come cheap if he agrees to allow Madame Bardeau to have more time to pay her debt. The curé is joined by Hector, a young poet on his way to Paris, and when the curé has left and Madeleine enters in search of her father, it becomes clear that the two young people are falling in love. When Lavatte returns he angrily takes Madeleine away, closely followed by Hector. The players enter: Mercury (their dancer), Venus, Diana, Mars, Bacchus and Jupiter, the manager of the troupe. Diana is fed up with the roving life and wants a change, but Jupiter reminds them that down the centuries they have known many hardships and must stick together. Hector enters and stands them all wine, and when Lavatte comes in they offer to perform their ‘Comedy of Olympus’. Lavatte drives a hard bargain with them before leaving, but refuses to allow Hector to come to the party. The players become animated and jubilant, while Hector declares his love for Madeleine, and Madame Bardeau complains about all the noise.

=== Act 2 ===
A large courtyard outside Lavatte’s house, the moon rising.
Madeleine comes out, unhappy because Hector has not been invited, but he, in disguise reveals himself and they ecstatically proclaim their love. There are cries from the house as Mercury comes out, and casts a spell on the lovers, who fall asleep. Guests emerge from the house and hear Diana sing of the joy of the hunt, then leading some off with her voice dying away in the distance. It is midnight and a group of male guests and Mars come onto the terrace and sing of war before they too go off; Lavatte is angry with the antics of the gods. Venus and Bacchus then appear, along with the rest of Lavatte's guests. Hector is taken with Venus's beauty.
Jupiter lectures all on the power of the old gods, telling them not to desert the ancient ways of mankind. Diana and Mars reappear, so all the gods apart from Mercury are together. Lavatte comes back into the courtyard with some police, and despite Jupiter's warning, calls on the police to arrest the gods; Jupiter sets the thunder rumbling and a thunderbolt knocks Lavatte to the ground.

=== Act 3 ===
Outside Lavatte’s house, where the players were to have staged their performance.
Morning is approaching; the gods’ powers are waning. Diana sings a lament. Madeleine is unhappy as Hector is still fascinated by Venus; Jupiter comforts her and she forgives Hector and agrees to marry him. As the day breaks, Lavatte comes in, desperate to rid himself of the night's magic, followed by the curé who claims to have found a way to exorcise the magic: Lavatte must provide gold to make a magic circle and to allow his daughter to follow her heart's will. A mock exorcising ceremony is started, and the players – as shabby as they were in Act 1 – enter and ask for their pay and a testimonial. Lavatte agrees, and as the sun rises, guests and servants come on the scene and sing a bridal chorus for Madeleine - as the players start again on their travels.
