= Ronald Lewis (baritone) =

Welsh opera singer

- Born: 16 January 1916; Pengam, Wales
- Died: 30 December 1967 (aged 51); London, England
- Occupation: Opera singer

Ronald Lewis (16 January 1916 – 30 December 1967) was a Welsh opera singer who sang leading baritone roles at the Royal Opera House, where he was a principal baritone in the company from 1951 to 1967, and the Welsh National Opera. He created the roles of Jean in Arthur Bliss's The Olympians, Bosun in Benjamin Britten's Billy Budd, and Henry Cuffe in Britten's Gloriana.

== Early life ==
Lewis was born in Pengam, a coal village in the Rhymney Valley in Wales and studied singing, piano and violin with his father Wyndham Lewis who was a choirmaster and organist at The Bont Chapel.

== Career ==
Lewis began singing with the Royal Opera in 1947, initially in minor roles. His house debut was on 30 January 1947 as one of the gamblers in Massenet's Manon. In 1950 he took over the role of Herr von Faninal in Der Rosenkavalier at 48 hours' notice and to great success. It was a role which he was to eventually make his own there. He appeared in over 300 performances with the company in the course of his career. Amongst his later roles there were Antenor in Troilus and Cressida (1963) and Alfio in Cavalleria Rusticana (1965). At the Welsh National Opera his roles included the title role in William Tell, Escamilo in Carmen, the title role in Macbeth, and Scarpia in Tosca. Lewis also appeared with the English Opera Group both on tour to Europe and at the Aldeburgh Festival singing the roles of Junius in Britten's The Rape of Lucretia (1954, 1959) and Pontius Pilate in Heinrich Schütz's St John Passion (1954). He appeared on television as Iago in Otello, the Angel Raphael in Bliss's Tobias and the Angel, and Michele in Il tabarro.

== Death ==
Lewis died of cancer in St Bartholomew's Hospital, London at the age of 51. One of his last stage appearances was in July 1967 when he once again sang the role of Herr von Faninal at the Royal Opera House in a special gala performance of Act 2 of Der Rosenkavalier conducted by Georg Solti.
