= Elizabeth Vaughan =

Welsh opera singer

Elizabeth Vaughan (born 12 March 1937) is a Welsh soprano, later a mezzo-soprano.

Vaughan was born in Llanfyllin, Montgomeryshire, and studied at the Royal Academy of Music with Olive Groves. She made her debut in Cardiff with the Welsh National Opera as Abigaille in Nabucco in 1960, a role which she also sang at Sadler's Wells. She first appeared at the Royal Opera House as Isotta in Die schweigsame Frau in 1961, and at the Metropolitan Opera in 1972 as Donna Elvira in Don Giovanni. Her account of Lady Penelope Rich in a 1984 performance of Gloriana at English National Opera was televised, and she appeared on screen numerous other times as well, including as an opera singer in the 1982 film Victor/Victoria.
