= Klaus Thunemann =

German bassoonist (1937–2025)

- Born: 19 April 1937; Magdeburg, Gau Magdeburg-Anhalt, German Reich
- Died: 29 August 2025 (aged 88)
- Occupations: Bassoonist; Academic teacher
- Years active: 1962–2006
- Organizations: Hochschule für Musik, Theater und Medien Hannover · Hochschule für Musik Hanns Eisler Berlin · Reina Sofía School of Music
- Awards: Order of Merit of the Federal Republic of Germany

Klaus Thunemann (19 April 1937 – 29 August 2025) was a German bassoonist and academic teacher. He played as principal bassoonist of the North German Radio Symphony Orchestra, as a soloist and with a focus on chamber music. He taught at the Hochschule für Musik, Theater und Medien Hannover, the Hochschule für Musik Hanns Eisler Berlin, and in Madrid at the International Institute of Chamber Music and the Reina Sofía School of Music.

== Life and career ==
Klaus Thunemann was born in Magdeburg on 19 April 1937. He originally studied piano at the Georg Philipp Telemann College of Music in his hometown. From the age of 18 focused on the bassoon. He left the German Democratic Republic in 1957 to study at the Hochschule für Musik in West Berlin with Willy Fugmann. Upon graduation in 1960, Thunemann was engaged by the North German Radio Symphony Orchestra of Hamburg, then as the orchestra's youngest player. He served as principal bassoonist from 1962 to 1978. He achieved a prize at the 1965 ARD International Music Competition. During his time with the orchestra he also appeared frequently as a soloist and in chamber music, playing with oboist Heinz Holliger, flutist Jean-Pierre Rampal and pianist András Schiff, among others. In the 1970s he also collaborated with jazz players and free improvisers such as Eberhard Weber.

Thunemann recorded extensively, including the complete bassoon solo repertoire. He recorded works by Vivaldi, Mozart, and others for labels such as Philips Records and Deutsche Grammophon. He recorded with pianist Alfred Brendel, oboist Heinz Holliger, and the chamber group I Musici among others.

From 1978 he focused on a teaching career in addition to his solo work. He first taught at the Hamburger Konservatorium, then from 1978 at the Hochschule für Musik, Theater und Medien Hannover, and from 1996 to 2005 at the Hochschule für Musik Hanns Eisler Berlin. He also taught internationally, at the Royal Academy of Music in London, in Austria, Denmark, Italy, Spain, Sweden, Argentina, Japan and the United States. He lectured in Berlin even after retirement. From 2008 he taught at Madrid's International Institute of Chamber Music, and the Reina Sofía School of Music, and the Barenboim–Said Akademie in Berlin. Many of his students play in leading orchestras of Europe.

Upon his retirement from teaching in 2006, the German government honored Thunemann with the Order of Merit of the Federal Republic of Germany. He continued to perform occasionally as a bassoon soloist. In October 2008, he appeared at the Jerusalem International Chamber Music Festival playing the Bassoon Sonata by Saint-Saëns. According to reviewer Robert Cummings, Thunemann was considered to be "one of the finest bassoonists of his generation".

Thunemann died on 29 August 2025, at the age of 88.
