= Diana Parikian =

British antiquarian bookseller

Diana Margaret Parikian (née Carbutt, formerly Marriner; 20 October 1926 – 3 April 2012) was a British antiquarian bookseller.

== Early life ==
Parikian was born in London, the eldest daughter of George Carbutt, a chartered accountant. She grew up in Chelsea and was educated at Francis Holland School for Girls and North Foreland Lodge. After World War II, she studied cello and piano at the Royal College of Music.

== Career ==
Parikian started as a bookseller when she found a dusty composite volume of eight Erasmus first editions for about £9 in the back room of a bookshop. She sold it to Jacques Vellekoop and asked for £100, who put it in his catalogue for £1,000. Parikian opened her own antiquarian bookshop in Oxford, and published some 80 catalogues over 45 years. Her specialist area was European books published before 1650.

== Personal life ==
Her first husband was conductor Neville Marriner, whom she met while studying at the Royal College of Music. The couple had one son, clarinettist Andrew Marriner, and one daughter, writer Susie Harries.

In 1957, she married the violinist and academic Manoug Parikian (1920–1987), with whom she had two sons, Stepan (Step) and Levon (Lev). They lived at the Old Rectory in Waterstock, Oxfordshire. Step Parikian was concerts and orchestra manager for the London Chamber Orchestra until 2021. Lev Parikian is a conductor and writer.
