= Australian String Quartet =

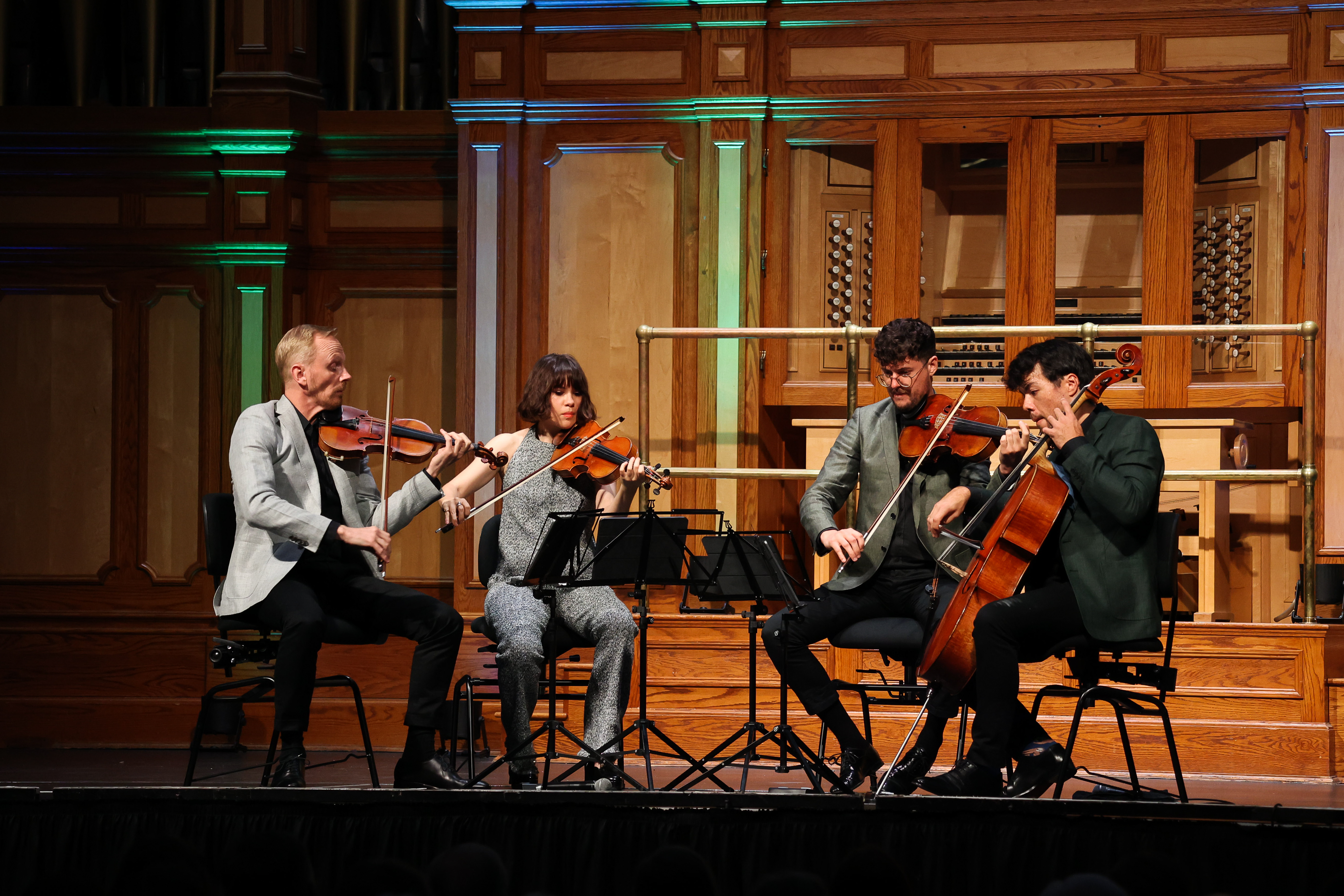
The Australian String Quartet. L to R: Dale Barltrop, Francesca Hiew, Christopher Cartlidge & Michael Dahlenburg

The Australian String Quartet (ASQ) is a chamber music group founded in 1985 and based at the University of Adelaide, South Australia. It delivers an artistic program of performances, workshops, commissions, digital content and education projects across Australia and abroad.

The quartet performs on a matched set of string instruments hand crafted by Giovanni Battista Guadagnini between c.1743-1784 in Italy. The earliest of these is a cello (c. 1743), and a violin (1748-49), both made in Piacenza. The viola (1783) and another violin (1784) were made in Turin.

The ASQ regularly tours Australia and the world. The current members are Dale Barltrop (violin), Francesca Hiew (violin), Christopher Cartlidge (viola) and Michael Dahlenburg (cello).

Guest artists have included pianists Angela Hewitt, Andrea Lam and Piers Lane, mezzo-soprano Anne Sofie von Otter, clarinettists Michael Collins and Ashley Smith, violist Brett Dean and cellist Pieter Wispelwey.

== In the media ==
In 2014-15, a documentary Highly Strung was made about the ASQ that documented the break-up of the quartet as it was then, plus the making of a copy of the cello by Italian luthier Roberto Cavagnoli. The documentary was made by acclaimed film-maker Scott Hicks. It introduces us to Ulrike Klein, a board member of the ASQ, and the members of the quartet.

== Awards and nominations ==
=== AIR Awards ===
The Australian Independent Record Awards (commonly known informally as AIR Awards) is an annual awards night to recognise, promote and celebrate the success of Australia's Independent Music sector.

Year	Nominee / work	Award	Result	Ref.
2026	Vanessa Perica, String Quartet No. 1 No Feeling is Final	Best Independent Classical Album or EP	Nominated	

=== APRA Music Awards ===
The APRA Awards are presented annually from 1982 by the Australasian Performing Right Association (APRA). They include the Art Music Awards (until 2009 Classical Music Awards) which are distributed by APRA and the Australian Music Centre (AMC).

Year	Nominee / work	Award	Result	Ref.
2005	Tales of the Supernatural (Andrew Ford) for Australian String Quartet, Jane Edwards	Vocal or Choral Work of the Year	Won	
2014	String Quartet No 5 (Andrew Ford) for Australian String Quartet	Work of the Year – Instrumental	Nominated	
2021	A Room of Her Own (Anne Cawrse) for Australian String Quartet	Work of the Year: Chamber Music	Won	

=== ARIA Music Awards ===
The ARIA Music Awards is an annual awards ceremony that recognises excellence, innovation, and achievement across all genres of Australian music. They commenced in 1987.

Year	Nominee / work	Award	Result	Ref.
2017	Migration (with Slava Grigoryan)	Best World Music Album	Nominated	

=== National Live Music Awards ===
The National Live Music Awards (NLMAs) commenced in 2016 to recognise contributions to the live music industry in Australia.

Year	Nominee / work	Award	Result	Ref.
2023	Australian String Quartet	Best Classical Act	Nominated	
