= Jaime Martín =

Spanish musician

Jaime Martín (born 1 September 1965) is a Spanish conductor and flautist.

== Early life ==
Born in Santander, Spain, Martín began his music studies on the flute at age 8, and became a member of the National Youth Orchestra of Spain at age 13. He was a pupil of Antonio Arias in Madrid and later with Paul Verhey in The Hague. He began his career as a flautist.

== Career ==
Martín attained posts as principal flute with the Academy of St Martin in the Fields, the Royal Philharmonic Orchestra and the London Philharmonic Orchestra, the last post with the LPO for 3 years. He also worked regularly as a member of the Chamber Orchestra of Europe. In 1991, he made his debut as soloist at Carnegie Hall with the Flute Concerto by Nielsen. He has recorded chamber music with the Gaudier Ensemble, the Brindisi String Quartet, Pinchas Zukerman and others. He is a founder member of the Cadaqués Orchestra. In 1998, he became a flute teacher at the Royal College of Music, London.

Martín became chief conductor (director titular) of the Orquesta de Cadaqués in 2011. In July 2012, Martín became artistic adviser of the Gävle Symphony Orchestra. On 1 July 2013, he became the orchestra's principal conductor, with an initial contract of 4 years. In September 2015, the orchestra extended his contract through 2020. Martín had been scheduled to conclude his tenure as chief conductor of the Gävle Symphony Orchestra at the close of the 2020–2021 season. However, in the wake of the COVID-19 pandemic, the orchestra and Martín extended the scheduled date of the conclusion of his tenure by one year, into 2022. He has recorded commercially with the Gävle Symphony Orchestra for such labels as Ondine.

Martín first guest-conducted the National Symphony Orchestra (Ireland) in September 2016. Following three subsequent return guest-conducting appearances, in January 2018, the National Symphony Orchestra announced the appointment of Martín as its next chief conductor, effective with the 2019–2020 season, with an initial contract of three years. In August 2022, the National Symphony Orchestra announced a two-season extension of Martín's contract as its chief conductor. He concluded his NSO tenure at the close of the 2023–2024 season.

In September 2017, Martín first guest-conducted the Los Angeles Chamber Orchestra (LACO). On the basis of this appearance, in February 2018, the LACO named Martín its next music director, effective with the 2019–2020 season, with an initial contract of three years. In June 2021, the LACO announced an extension of Martín's contract through 2027. In February 2026, the LACO announced that Martín is to conclude his tenure as its music director at the close of the 2026–2027 season, and subsequently to take the title of music director laureate.

Martín first guest-conducted the Melbourne Symphony Orchestra (MSO) in June 2019, and returned for an additional guest-conducting appearance in February 2021. In June 2021, the MSO announced the appointment of Martín as its next chief conductor, effective in 2022. In March 2024, the MSO announced the extension of Martín's contract as chief conductor to 2028, with the addition of the title of artistic adviser. In November 2026, the MSO announced that Martín is to conclude his tenure chief conductor to the close of 2029, and subsequently to take the title of conductor emeritus in 2030.

Martín has commissioned premieres of works by Ellen Reid, Andrew Norman, Missy Mazzoli, Derrick Skye, Albert Schnelzer and Juan Pablo Contreras. He is a Fellow of the Royal College of Music, London. Martín became principal guest conductor of the BBC National Orchestra of Wales effective with the 2024–2025 season.

== Personal life ==
Martín is married to Rachel Gough, principal bassoonist of the London Symphony Orchestra. The couple have two sons and live in London.

Cultural offices
Preceded by Robin Ticciati	Principal Conductor, Gävle Symphony Orchestra; 2013–2022	Succeeded by Christian Reif
Preceded by Alan Buribayev	Chief Conductor, National Symphony Orchestra (Ireland); 2019–2024	Succeeded by Alexander Shelley
Preceded by Jeffrey Kahane	Music Director, Los Angeles Chamber Orchestra; 2019–present	Succeeded by incumbent
