= Academy of St Martin in the Fields =

English chamber orchestra

Coordinates: 51.5237°N 0.09609°W

- Chamber orchestra
- Former name: The Academy of St. Martin-in-the-Fields
- Founded: 1959
- Location: London, England
- Music director: Joshua Bell
- Website: asmf.org

The Academy of St Martin in the Fields (ASMF) is an English orchestra, based since 2026 at The Warehouse in London.

John Churchill, then Master of Music at the London church of St Martin-in-the-Fields, and Neville Marriner founded the orchestra as "The Academy of St. Martin-in-the-Fields", a small, conductorless string group. The ASMF gave its first concert on 13 November 1959, in the church after which it was named. In 1988, the orchestra dropped the hyphens from its full name.

== History ==
The initial performances as a string orchestra at St Martin-in-the-Fields played a key role in the revival of Baroque performances in England. The orchestra has since expanded to include winds. It remains flexible in size, changing its make-up to suit its repertoire, which ranges from the Baroque to contemporary works.

Neville Marriner continued to perform obbligatos and concertino solos with the orchestra until 1969, and led the orchestra on recordings until the autumn of 1970, when he switched to conducting from the podium from directing the orchestra from the leader's desk. Marriner held the title of Life President until his death in 2016. On recordings, besides Marriner, Iona Brown and Kenneth Sillito have led the orchestra, among others.

In 1993 the Academy of St Martin in the Fields became the first – and to date, only – orchestra to be awarded The Queen's Award for Export Achievement.

Since 2000 Murray Perahia has held the title of principal guest conductor of the orchestra, and has made commercial recordings with the orchestra as pianist and conductor.

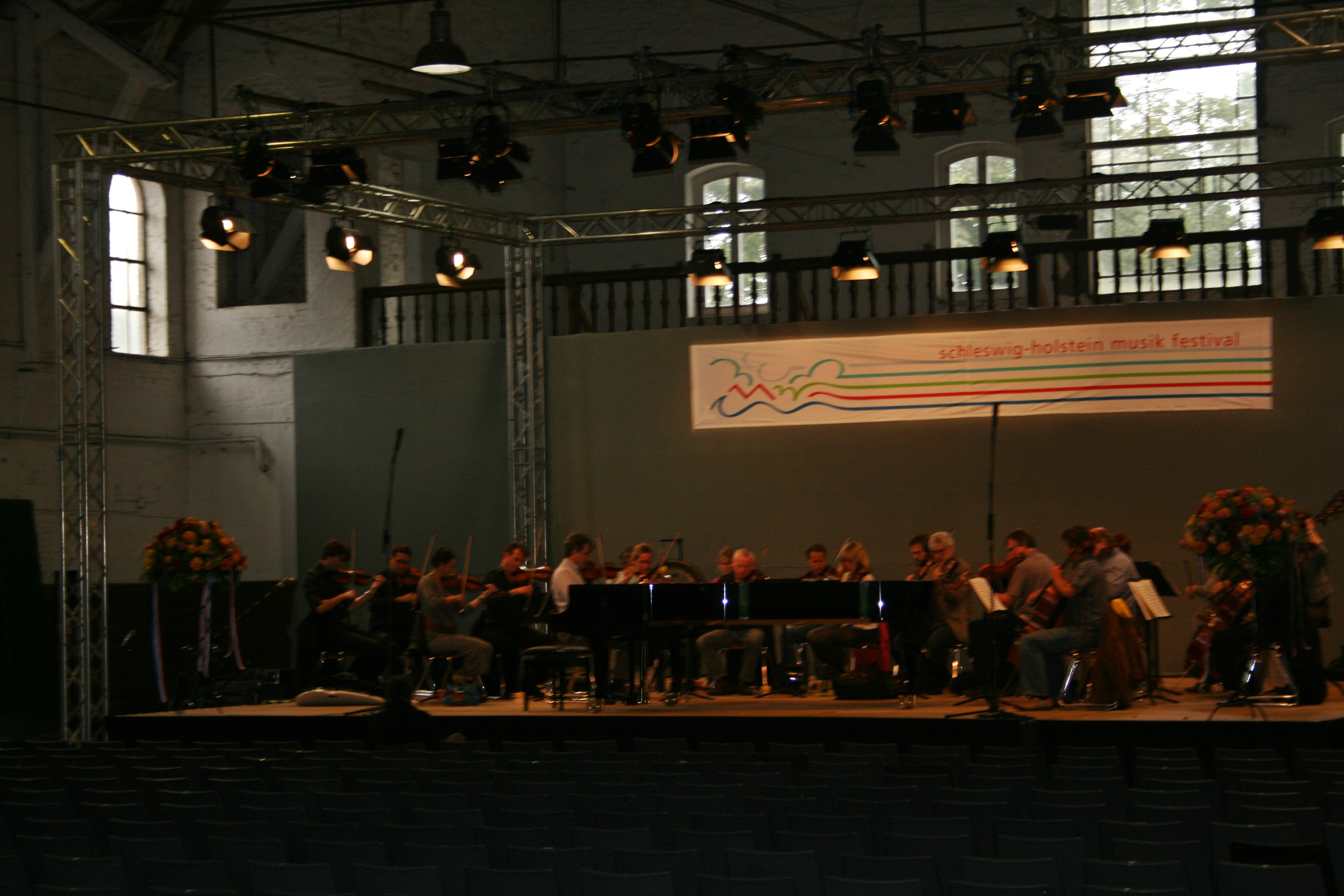
The Academy of St. Martin in the Fields during the Schleswig-Holstein Musik Festival, 2011

In May 2011, the orchestra appointed Joshua Bell as its new music director, the second person to hold the title in the orchestra's history, effective September 2011, with an initial contract of three years. In July 2017, the ASMF extended Bell's contract through 2020, an additional three years from his previous contract extension. In April 2024, the ASMF announced an additional extension of Bell's contract as its music director through August 2028.

Sally Beamish was composer-in-residence with the ASMF, the first composer so affiliated with the ASMF, scheduled through the 2019–2020 season.

In October 2026 it was announced that ASMF has acquired ownership of The Warehouse in London SE1 as its permanent base, and that of its Ensemble Unheard orchestra of people experiencing homelessness, with the aim of creating a leading cultural hub for the area.

== Chorus ==
In 1974 Neville Marriner encouraged László Heltay to form the Chorus of the Academy of St Martin in the Fields, composed of straight, accurate voices and designed to match the instrumental sound of the by then world-famous orchestra. The choir made its debut in 1975 in Düsseldorf and was soon an established feature of the orchestra's programming. Its first recording was Bach's Mass in B minor in 1977. Heltay's choral and Marriner's instrumental styles matched perfectly, and the partnership of 25 years took Heltay and the chorus through numerous concerts, tours and 28 recordings from the major choral repertoire with soloists such as Dietrich Fischer-Dieskau, Janet Baker, Kiri Te Kanawa, Robert Tear and Anthony Rolfe Johnson. Performances with Heltay as chorus master included the 250th-anniversary of Handel's Messiah in Dublin in 1992 and the closing concerts of the handover of Hong Kong in 1997, and their recordings also include the soundtrack for Amadeus in 1984, and the UEFA Champions League Anthem. In more recent years, after its dedicated chorus was discontinued the orchestra has worked with a number of independent choral groups, such as the Ambrosian Singers and as of 2024 it is regularly joined by the professional St Martin’s Voices.

== Recordings ==
The orchestra's first recording was for the L'Oiseau-Lyre label at Conway Hall on 25 March 1961. It has since accumulated an extensive discography, and is one of the most recorded chamber orchestras in the world, with over 500 sessions. Other labels the orchestra has recorded for include Argo, Capriccio, Chandos, Decca, EMI, Hänssler, Hyperion, and Philips. Earlier recordings by the ASMF from the old Philips label have been reissued on Pentatone. The orchestra has also recorded under the names "Argo Chamber Orchestra", "London String Players", and "London Strings".

The soundtrack to the Oscar-winning film Amadeus, a fictional account of the life of the composer Wolfgang Amadeus Mozart and his bitter feud with rival Antonio Salieri features many of Mozart's most popular compositions. Recorded by the Academy and Sir Neville Marriner in 1984, the soundtrack to Amadeus reached #1 in the Billboard Classical Albums Chart, #56 in the Billboard Popular Albums Chart, has sold over 6.5 million copies to date and received 13 Gold Discs, making it one of the most popular classical music recordings of all time. The partnership between the academy and its founder Sir Neville Marriner is the most recorded of any orchestra and conductor.

== Chamber Ensemble ==
The Academy of St Martin in the Fields Chamber Ensemble was created in 1967 to perform the larger chamber works with players who customarily worked together, instead of the usual string quartet with additional guests. Drawn from the principal players of the academy and led by violinist Tomo Keller, the Chamber Ensemble performs in all shapes and sizes, from string quintets to octets, and in various other configurations featuring winds. Its touring commitments are extensive and include regular tours of Europe and North America, whilst recording contracts with Philips Classics, Hyperion, and Chandos have led to the release of over thirty CDs.

== Marriner 100 ==
In April 2024 the Academy marked the centenary of its founder’s birth with concerts in St Martin-in-the-Fields church, the Wigmore Hall, the Royal Festival Hall and Lincoln Cathedral (the city of his birth). The Marriner 100 programme commenced on 15 April, the actual centenary day, with a concert at the orchestra’s spiritual home, St Martin-in-the-Fields, directed/conducted by leader Tomo Keller, music director Joshua Bell and former Academy flautist Jaime Martin, in which former members of the Academy Chorus, who had sung under Marriner, performed a suite from Die Schöpfung. BBC Radio 3 broadcast the concert as the climax of its Neville Marriner Day, with all its programmes devoted to his life, work and legacy. A month-long centenary exhibition was held in the church.

== Sources ==
- Stuart, Philip. Marriner and the Academy – A Record Partnership. London: Academy of St. Martin in the Fields, 1999.
- Harries, Meirion and Susie. The Academy of St Martin in the Fields, London, 1981.
