= List of string quartet ensembles =

This is a list of recognized string quartets (i.e. groups of musical performers), current or past, in alphabetical order. It does not include the names of musical quartet compositions.

== A ==
- Abramyan String Quartet
- Aeolian
- Aizuri Quartet
- Alban Berg
- Alberni
- ALEA
- Alexander
- Allegri
- Amadeus
- Amar
- Amati
- American String Quartet
- Amsterdam String Quartet
- Ancora String Quartet
- Annex String Quartet
- Apple Hill String Quartet
- Arcanto Quartet
- Arditti Quartet
- Ariel String Quartet
- Aron Quartet
- Arpeggione
- Artaria String Quartet
- Artemis Quartet
- Atom String Quartet
- Atrium String Quartet
- Audubon Quartet
- Australian String Quartet
- Aviv String Quartet

== B ==
- Badke Quartet
- Balanescu Quartet
- Barcelona
- Bartók Quartet
- Barylli Quartet
- Bastiaan Quartet
- Beethoven Quartet
- Béla Quartet
- Belcea Quartet
- Berkshire String Quartet
- Bessler Quartet
- Blair Quartet
- Bohemian Quartet
- Bond
- Borodin Quartet
- Borromeo String Quartet
- Boston String Quartet
- Brentano Quartet
- Brodsky Quartet
- Brooklyn Rider
- Budapest Quartet original
- Budapest String Quartet
- Busch Quartet

== C ==
- Calder Quartet
- Calidore String Quartet
- Capet Quartet
- Carducci Quartet
- Carmel
- Carmine Quartet
- Carpe Diem String Quartet
- La Catrina Quartet
- Casals
- Cassatt Quartet
- Cavani Quartet
- Chiara String Quartet
- Chilingirian Quartet
- Ciompi Quartet
- Circadian String Quartet
- Cleveland Quartet
- The Composers Quartet
- Concord String Quartet
- Conservatory String Quartet
- ConTempo Quartet
- Corigliano Quartet
- Corvinus Quartet
- Coull Quartet
- Cuarteto Casals
- Cuarteto Latinoamericano
- Curtis String Quartet
- Cypress Quartet
- Czech Quartet

== D ==
- Dallas String Quartet
- Danish String Quartet
- Danubius Quartet
- Dartington String Quartet
- Delme Quartet
- Del Sol Quartet
- Doric Quartet
- Dover Quartet
- Dubois String Quartet
- Duke Quartet

== E ==
- Ébène Quartet
- Element Quartet
- Emerson String Quartet
- Endellion Quartet
- Enesco Quartet
- English String Quartet
- Enso String Quartet
- Escala
- Escher String Quartet
- Esmé Quartet
- Esterhazy Quartet
- Ethel
- Euclid Quartet
- Entheos String Quartet

== F ==
- Fanny Mendelssohn Quartet
- Festetics String Quartet
- Fibonacci Quartet
- Fine Arts Quartet
- Fitzwilliam Quartet
- Fleshquartet
- Flonzaley Quartet
- Flux Quartet
- Formosa Quartet
- FourPlay String Quartet
- Fred Sherry String Quartet
- Fry Street Quartet

== G ==
- Gabrieli Quartet
- Galatea Quartet
- Galimir Quartet
- Gaya Quartet
- Gewandhaus
- Goldner String Quartet
- Griller Quartet
- Guarneri Quartet

== H ==
- Hagen Quartet
- Hampton String Quartet
- Harlem Quartet
- Hawthorne String Quartet
- Hellmesberger Quartet
- Henschel Quartet
- Henry Holst String Quartet
- Hollywood String Quartet
- Hugo Wolf Quartet
- Hungarian Quartet

== J ==
- JACK Quartet
- Jade String Quartet
- Janáček Quartet
- Jasper String Quartet
- Jerusalem Quartet
- Juilliard String Quartet
- Jupiter String Quartet

== K ==
- Kneisel Quartet
- Kocian Quartet
- Kodály Quartet
- Kolisch Quartet
- Komitas Quartet
- Kopelman Quartet
- Krettly Quartet
- Kreutzer Quartet
- Kronos Quartet
- Kuss Quartet
- Kutcher String Quartet

== L ==
- Laclede Quartet
- Lark Quartet
- LaSalle Quartet
- Léner Quartet
- Leningrad Taneiev Quartet
- Lindsay String Quartet
- Loewenguth Quartet
- London Haydn Quartet
- London Quartet
- Ludwig Schuster

== M ==
- MacNaghten String Quartet
- Maggini Quartet
- Marie Hall
- Marie Soldat-Roeger Quartet
- Marmen Quartet
- Martinů Quartet
- Mecklenburg Quartet (Saint Petersburg)
- Medici Quartet
- Melos Quartet
- Methera
- Midnight String Quartet
- Miró Quartet
- Modigliani Quartet
- Moscow String Quartet
- Moyzes Quartet
- Müller Brothers
- Musica Viva Australia

== N ==
- Nevine String Quartet
- Nevsky String Quartet
- New Hungarian Quartet
- New Italian Quartet
- New Orford String Quartet
- New Vlach
- New World String Quartet
- New Zealand String Quartet

== O ==
- Oberlin String Quartet
- Olive Mead Quartet
- Orford String Quartet
- Orion String Quartet
- Orlando Quartet
- Oslo String Quartet

== P ==
- Pacifica Quartet
- Paganini Quartet
- Panocha Quartet
- Parisii Quartet
- Parker Quartet
- Parrenin Quartet
- Pascal Quartet
- Pavel Haas Quartet
- Penderecki String Quartet
- Perolé Quartet
- Petersen Quartet
- Philadelphia String Quartet
- Philharmonia Quartet
- Philharmonia Quartet Berlin
- Philharmonic Quartet
- Prague Quartet
- Pražák Quartet
- Prima Vista Quartet
- Pro Arte Quartet

== Q ==
- Quatuor Bozzini
- Quartet de Barcelona
- Quarteto Bessler-Reis
- Quartetto di Cremona
- Quartetto Energie Nove
- Quartetto Italiano
- Quatuor Arpeggione
- Quatuor Mosaïques

== R ==
- radio.string.quartet.vienna
- RaVen Quartet
- Regent String Quartet
- Rosamunde Quartett
- Rosé Quartet
- RTÉ Vanbrugh Quartet
- Rubio Quartet

== S ==
- Sacconi Quartet
- St. Lawrence Quartet
- St. Petersburg String Quartet
- Salomon Quartet
- San Francisco
- Schumann Quartet
- Schuppanzigh Quartet
- Section Quartet
- Ševčík-Lhotský Quartet
- Shanghai String Quartet
- Shostakovich
- Signum String Quartet
- Silesian String Quartet
- SKAZ String Quartet
- Smetana Quartet
- Smith Quartet
- Soldier String Quartet
- Somogyi String Quartet
- Sonus Quartet
- Soweto String Quartet
- Spektral Quartet
- Spencer Dyke Quartet
- Stamic Quartet
- Stanford String Quartet
- Strub Quartet
- Stratton Quartet (original)

== T ==
- T'ang Quartet
- Takács Quartet
- Talich Quartet
- Taneyev
- Tátrai Quartet
- Tokyo String Quartet
- Toronto String Quartette
- Turtle Island String Quartet

== U ==
- Utrecht String Quartet

== V ==
- Vaghy String Quartet
- Végh Quartet
- Vermeer Quartet
- Vertavo String Quartet
- Viano String Quartet
- Villiers Quartet
- Virtuoso Quartet
- Vitamin String Quartet
- Vlach Quartet
- Voces Quartet
- Vogler Quartet

== W ==
- Walden String Quartet
- Wihan Quartet

== Y ==
- Yale Quartet
- Ysaÿe Quartet (1886)
- Ysaÿe Quartet (1984)
- Ying Quartet

== Z ==
- Zagreb Quartet (1919–present)
- Zephyr Quartet
- Zoellner Quartet
- Zorian Quartet
