= Corvin =

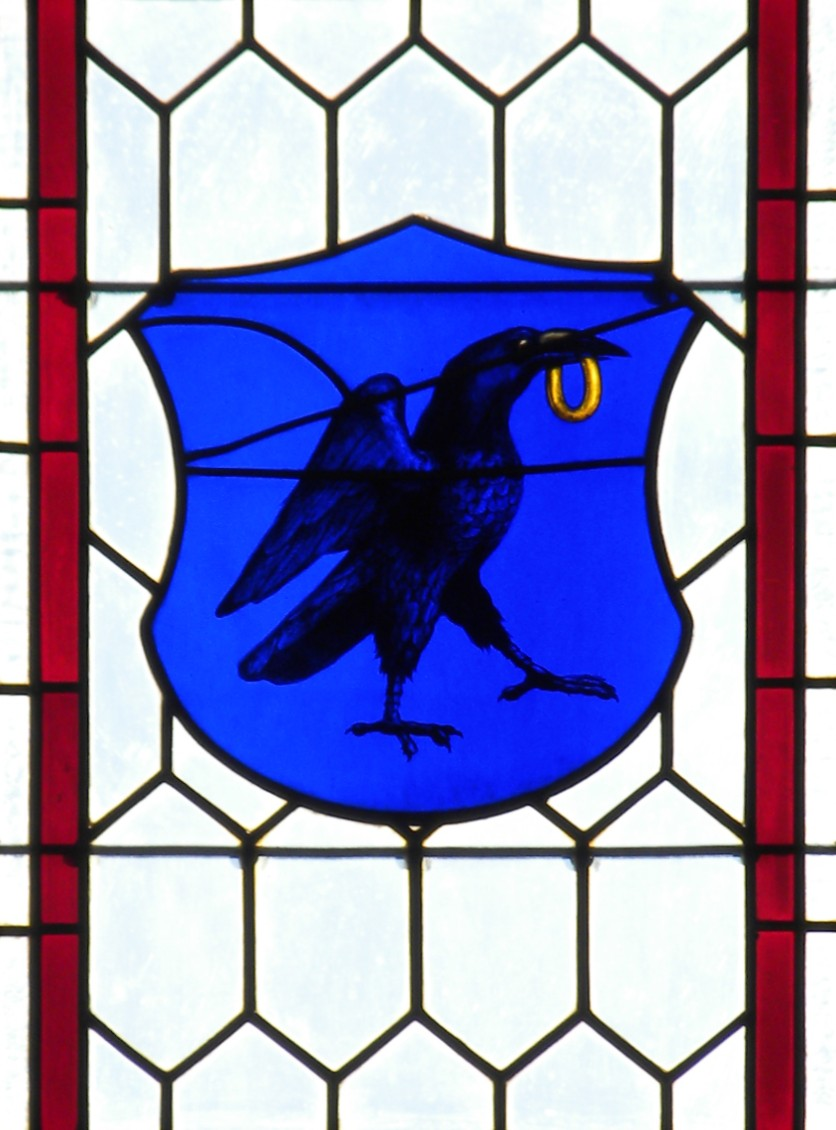
Stained glass window with the coat of arms of the House of Hunyadi in the southern nave of the Cathedral of St. Elisabeth, Košice/Kassa, Slovakia.

The name Corvin comes from the Latin name Corvinus, which derives from the Latin word corvus meaning raven. The word today refers to the birds' genus including ravens and crows, among others.

Corvin is most commonly a surname, but it and its variations are being used as a given name as well. As a given name, its most common variations are Corvan, Korvin, Korwin, and their English equivalent Raven.

In Ireland, the surname Corvin, also transcribed as Corvan, Corravan, and others, is a corruption of the Irish (Gaelic) name O Corra Ban, part of the O Corra (in English Corr) sept or sub-clan. "Corr" means odd or singular, while the addition of "Ban" means white. The Corr sept fell under the authority of the O Neill clan. The O Corra Bans were concentrated in County Armagh where versions of the name are still most commonly found. Following political and religious unrest in Armagh in the 1790s, there was a migration of numbers of Catholic families from the county, including a number of Corvins or Corvans.

== Surname ==
=== Historical ===
As a surname, it can refer to:

- Marcus Valerius Corvus (c. 370 – c. 270 BC), an important military commander and politician. Considered a hero in the Roman Republic, of the Patrician gens Valeria, and unconfirmed founder of gens Corvin/Corvinus;
- Marcus Valerius Messalla Corvinus (64 BC – 8 AD), a Roman general, author, patron of literature and art. Descendant of Marcus Valerius Corvus and the legendary ancestor of Hungarian Royalty;
- Hunyadi family, a Hungarian noble family that is also referred to as the Corvin or Corvinus family. Mentions of the Corvin or Corvinus coat of arms in historical documents refer to the one of House Hunyadi;
- Matthias Corvinus of Hungary, one of the most famous Hungarian rulers, also known as Mátyás Hunyadi or Matei Corvin, known as King Matthias the Just, and represents in tales and folklore the ideal ruler;
- Ion Corvin (Romanian variant of John Hunyadi), (c. 1406–1456), Voivode of Transylvania, captain-general and regent of the Kingdom of Hungary
- János Corvinus (John Corvinus; 1473–1504), a Hungarian politician, illegitimate son of Matthias Corvinus;
- Diego Suárez Corvín, also known as Diego Suárez Montañés or el Montañés (1552–1623), Spanish soldier and writer

=== 19th century onward ===
- Hugh Corvin (1900–1975), Irish republican leader
- Otto von Corvin (1812–1886), German author
- Nicole Dyane Corvinus (1994–), German singer

== Places ==
- Corvin Castle, also known as Hunyadi Castle or Hunedoara Castle, a Gothic-Renaissance castle in Hunedoara, Romania
- Corvin River or Valea Mare a right tributary of the Danube in Romania
- Ion Corvin, Constanța, a commune in Constanţa County, Romania
- Corvinus University of Budapest, a Hungarian university
- Hundreds of streets, schools, museums, hotels, etc. are named after King Matthias Corvinus in the current territory of Hungary and also in the former territory of the Kingdom of Hungary, which bear the name Corvin or Corvinus.
- Corvin-negyed metro station, a station on the M3 line of the Budapest Metro, Hungary
- Korwin-Litwicki Urban Manor, built by the project of Architect Carlo Rossi in Tver, Russia

== Arts and entertainment ==
- Michael Corvin, a fictional character from the Underworld film series, portrayed by Scott Speedman. The character is hinted at being related to King Matthias the Just of Hungary, which would make him a fictional claimant to the crown of the Kingdom of Hungary
- Corvinus Quartet, renowned Budapest-based Hungarian string quartet.

== See also ==
- Korwin coat of arms
