= Euclid Quartet =

American string quartet

- Origin: Cleveland, Ohio, United States
- Genre: Classical
- Occupation: String quartet
- Instruments: 2 violins, 1 viola, 1 cello
- Years active: 1998–present
- Members: Jameson Cooper, Luis Enrique Vargas, Aviva Hakanoglu, Justin Goldsmith
- Website: https://www.euclidquartet.com

The Euclid Quartet is an American string quartet based in South Bend, Indiana. Formed in Cleveland, Ohio, in 1998, the quartet has been the faculty string quartet-in-residence at Indiana University South Bend since 2007. Its current members are violinists Jameson Cooper and Aviva Hakanoglu, violist Luis Enrique Vargas, and cellist Justin Goldsmith. The quartet performs throughout the United States and Canada and has appeared at venues and festivals including Carnegie Hall, the Aspen Music Festival, Music Mountain, the Great Lakes Chamber Music Festival, the Mostly Modern Festival, and the Orford Arts Festival.

== Musicians ==
As of 2026, the Euclid Quartet consists of:

Jameson Cooper — violin

Aviva Hakanoglu — violin

Luis Enrique Vargas — viola

Justin Goldsmith — cello

Cooper is a founding member of the quartet and is originally from Sheffield, England. He studied at Royal Northern College of Music in Manchester, England, and then at Kent State University. He is the concertmaster of the South Bend Symphony Orchestra and is a faculty member at Indiana University South Bend.

Hakanoglu joined the quartet in 2021. She studied at Harvard University, Indiana University Jacobs School of Music, and Stony Brook University. She holds the principal second violin position of the South Bend Symphony Orchestra and is a co-director of the Louise E. Addicott Summer Chamber Music Festival at Indiana University South Bend.

Vargas, a native of Venezuela, joined the quartet in 2001. He studied at the Simón Bolívar Conservatory of Music in Venezuela, and then at Miami University in Oxford, Ohio, and Northern Illinois University. He is a faculty member at Indiana University South Bend since 2007, co-director of the Louise E. Addicott Summer Chamber Music Festival, and an adjudicator and coach for the Fischoff National Chamber Music Association.

Goldsmith joined the quartet in 2022. He studied cello at Vanderbilt University Blair School of Music and Indiana University Jacobs School of Music. He was previously a member of the Vera Quartet, the string quartet in residence at the Curtis Institute of Music from 2018 to 2020. He is on the faculty of Indiana University South Bend and the University of Notre Dame.

=== Former members ===
The quartet has undergone several personnel changes since its formation. Founding violinist Jameson Cooper is the only original member remaining in the current ensemble. Violinists Jacob Murphy and Brendan Shea, and cellists Amy Joseph, David Beem, Si-Yan Darren Li, and Chris Wild are among the musicians who have performed with the quartet at different periods.

== History ==
=== Formation and early years ===
The Euclid Quartet was formed in Cleveland, Ohio, in 1998 by students at Kent State University. The ensemble took its name from Euclid Avenue in Cleveland, which is associated with several of the city's major cultural institutions. The quartet quickly established itself through performances and competitions. In 2001, it became the resident string quartet of the Sioux City Symphony Orchestra and faculty quartet at Morningside University in Sioux City, Iowa. During its early years, the ensemble also performed at the Kent/Blossom and Orford festivals and participated in the Aspen Music Festival's Center for Advanced Quartet Studies.

In 2002 and 2003, the quartet was selected as a fellowship quartet at the Aspen Music Festival. It subsequently participated in the Carnegie Hall Professional Training Workshop, where it studied with the Emerson String Quartet.

=== Competitions and international recognition ===
The quartet has received prizes in several chamber music competitions, including the second place at the 2003 Chamber Music Yellow Springs Competition and the Grand Prize at the inaugural Hugo Kauder International Competition for String Quartets in 2004. In 2005, the Euclid Quartet competed in the fifth Osaka International Chamber Music Competition in Japan and received the Bronze Medal. The award brought the ensemble international recognition and was subsequently cited as a significant achievement for an American string quartet.

=== Indiana University South Bend ===
In 2007, the Euclid Quartet became the faculty string quartet-in-residence at Indiana University South Bend (IU South Bend). The residency continues a tradition of faculty string quartets at the university dating back more than five decades. The quartet’s members teach individual string lessons, coach chamber ensembles, perform on campus, and participate in community and educational programs. The residency has also provided the quartet with a permanent base for performances, recording projects, and educational activities.

== Activities ==
The Euclid Quartet maintains an active concert schedule in the United States and Canada. It played at the Library of Congress and has appeared at the Aspen Music Festival, Music Mountain, Great Lakes Chamber Music Festival, Kent/Blossom Music Festival, Orford Arts Festival, and Mostly Modern Festival. The ensemble has also appeared in concert series and educational programs at universities, libraries, schools, and arts organizations.

The quartet's collaborators have included violist James Dunham, violinist Gregory Fulkerson, pianist Warren Jones, cellist Paul Katz, violinist Joseph Silverstein, and pianist Alexander Toradze.

=== Anna Clyne’s Quarter Days ===
In October 2023, the Euclid Quartet appeared as soloists with the South Bend Symphony Orchestra in the world premiere of Quarter Days, a concerto for string quartet and orchestra by British composer Anna Clyne. The work was commissioned by the Fischoff National Chamber Music Association and the South Bend Symphony Orchestra to mark Fischoff's 50th anniversary and the symphony's 90th anniversary. The premiere took place at the DeBartolo Performing Arts Center at the University of Notre Dame and was conducted by Alastair Willis. The four-movement composition takes its title from the traditional quarter days marking the equinoxes and solstices and was inspired in part by T. S. Eliot's poem Burnt Norton. Clyne initially composed the string-quartet part before adding the orchestra, treating the quartet as the central musical voice.

== Educational activities ==
Education and community engagement have been central to the quartet's work. At IU South Bend, the musicians teach individual students and coach chamber music ensembles. Students also have opportunities to perform with members of the quartet in university and community programs.

In 2009, the quartet received an American Masterpieces grant from the National Endowment for the Arts for an educational program exploring music associated with different cultural backgrounds and ethnicities in the United States. The program involved performances for schoolchildren and interactive activities in which students acted as “quartet scene investigators” to explore the cultural contexts of the music.

The quartet has also presented master classes and educational programs at colleges, schools, and chamber music organizations. Its members have participated in programs of the Fischoff National Chamber Music Association and other youth music initiatives.

=== Addicott Summer Chamber Music Festival ===
The members of the Euclid Quartet are the founders and artistic directors of Louise E. Addicott Summer Chamber Music Festival held on the IU South Bend campus. The festival was established in 2025 as an intensive chamber music program for high school and college-age musicians and provides participants with chamber music coaching, master classes, rehearsals, and performance opportunities. The 2026 festival featured members of the Euclid, Verona, and Viano quartets as faculty and guest artists.

== Repertoire ==
The Euclid Quartet's repertoire encompasses works from the Baroque, Classical, Romantic, modern, and contemporary periods. Programs have included standard works by composers such as Joseph Haydn, Wolfgang Amadeus Mozart, Ludwig van Beethoven, Antonín Dvořák, Claude Debussy, and Béla Bartók, alongside less frequently performed works and contemporary compositions. The quartet has shown particular interest in American music and works that incorporate elements of American popular and folk traditions.

The quartet has also commissioned and premiered works by contemporary composers, including Anna Clyne, Robert Paterson, Armando Bayolo, Jorge Muñiz, and Dan Welcher.

As of 2026, the Euclid Quartet has released six albums. Its debut recording, released by Centaur Records, contains the first four string quartets of Czech-born Moravian composer Hugo Kauder. The recording followed the quartet's victory in the 2004 Hugo Kauder competition.

Its recordings include:

Hugo Kauder: String Quartets 1–4 — Centaur Records, 2007

Bartók: String Quartets Nos. 2, 4 & 6 — Artek Recordings, 2010

Bartók: String Quartets Nos. 1, 3 & 5 — Artek Recordings, 2013

American Quartets: Antonín Dvořák & Wynton Marsalis — Afinat Records, 2017

Breve — Afinat Records, 2024

Grieg & Debussy — Afinat Records, 2024

The two Bartók recordings together constitute the complete cycle of the composer's six string quartets. The recordings were made with engineer and producer Da-Hong Seetoo.

=== American Quartets ===
Released in 2017, American Quartets pairs Dvořák’s American Quartet with Wynton Marsalis’s At the Octoroon Balls. The pairing was noted for connecting Dvořák’s engagement with American musical materials to Marsalis’s use of jazz and other American traditions. The album was released by Afinat Records, with a portion of proceeds designated for the String Scholarship Fund at the Ernestine M. Raclin School of the Arts at IU South Bend, and received positive reviews by music critics.

=== Breve ===
Released in 2024, Breve consists of eleven short works for string quartet representing a variety of periods and styles. The program includes works by Mozart, Schubert, Antonín Dvořák, William Bolcom, Astor Piazzolla, and others. The recording received positive reviews from classical music publications and public radio outlets.

=== Grieg & Debussy ===
Also released in 2024 by Afinat Records, Grieg & Debussy pairs Edvard Grieg’s String Quartet No. 1 in G minor, Op. 27, with Claude Debussy’s String Quartet in G minor, Op. 10. The album marked the quartet’s return to repertoire by two European composers whose works date from the late nineteenth and early twentieth centuries.

== Awards and honors ==
First Prize, Hugo Kauder International Competition for String Quartets, 2004

Second Place, Chamber Music Yellow Springs Competition, 2003

Bronze Medal, Osaka International Chamber Music Competition, 2005

String Quartet Fellowship, Aspen Music Festival, 2002 and 2003

"Access to Artistic Excellence" grant from the National Endowment for the Arts, 2009

"American Masterpieces" grant from the National Endowment for the Arts, 2009

== See also ==
Indiana University South Bend

Addicott Summer Chamber Music Festival

Fischoff National Chamber Music Association

List of string quartet ensembles

String quartet

Chamber music
