= Wigmore Hall International String Quartet Competition =

The triennial Wigmore Hall International String Quartet Competition (formerly The London International String Quartet Competition) has been held under the auspices of Wigmore Hall since July 2010. Embracing the entire string quartet tradition, it requires contestants to perform Classical, Romantic and contemporary repertoire.

== History ==
The competition originated as the Portsmouth International String Quartet Competition in 1979, and was the first recurrent international string quartet competition in the world, following similar lines to competitions such as the Leeds International Piano Competition and Tchaikovsky International Competition for individual instrumentalists. Since then, it has normally been held every 3 years. The fourth competition in 1988 was held in London and became the London International String Quartet Competition until 2010, when the Wigmore Hall took over the organisation.

The first winners were the Takacs Quartet, followed by the Hagen Quartet in 1982 and the Alexander String Quartet in 1985. These, and most other winners, have gone on to successful international performing careers. Other similar competitions have since begun, such as the Banff International String Quartet Competition and others in Osaka and Melbourne.

The full list of winners is:

- 2025 – Opus13,
- 2022 – Leonkoro Quartet – competition postponed by one year due to Covid-19
- 2018 – Esmé Quartet
- 2015 - Quatour Van Kuijk
- 2012 – Arcadia Quartet
- 2009 – Danish String Quartet
- 2006 – Formosa Quartet
- 2003 – Atrium String Quartet
- 2000 – Casals Quartet
- 1997 – Auer Quartet
- 1994 – Vellinger Quartet
- 1991 – Wihan Quartet
- 1988 – Vanbrugh Quartet
- 1985 – Alexander Quartet
- 1982 – Hagen Quartet
- 1979 – Takacs Quartet

== Competition details ==
Currently, of the string quartets from around the world who submit entries, up to twelve are selected to take part in the competition. All members of the quartets must be under the age of 35. After playing Haydn, Mozart, a 20th-century work and a fixed competition piece before audiences over a period of several days, six semi-finalists are selected, and each play a quartet from a selected list from the Romantic era (19th century). Three finalists are then selected and play a Beethoven quartet. The competition rules have varied over the years; for instance, in some years up to 2018, the Beethoven quartet was played in the semi-final and the Romantic era quartet in the final.

Each year the winning ensemble receives a cash prize and a three-year career development programme, including a recording session and a UK performance tour. There are also cash prizes for second and third place and smaller specific prizes.
