= Robert Greenberg =

American composer (born 1954)

- Born: April 18, 1954 (age 72); Brooklyn, New York, U.S.
- Occupation: Composer
- Website: robertgreenbergmusic.com

Robert M. Greenberg (born April 18, 1954) is an American composer, pianist, and musicologist who was born in Brooklyn, New York. He has composed more than 50 works for a variety of instruments and voices, and has recorded a number of lecture series on music history and music appreciation for The Great Courses.

== Biography ==
Greenberg earned a B.A. in music (magna cum laude) from Princeton University and received a Ph.D. in music composition from the University of California, Berkeley, where he studied with Olly Wilson. He has served on the faculties of UC Berkeley, California State University, East Bay, and the San Francisco Conservatory of Music, where he was chairman of the Department of Music History and Literature and Director of the Adult Extension Division. Greenberg is the music historian in residence with San Francisco Performances, and he hosts their Saturday morning series of lecture–performances with the Alexander String Quartet.

Greenberg has received numerous awards, including three Nicola De Lorenzo Prizes in composition, and three Meet the Composer grants. Additionally, he has received commissions from the Koussevitzky Foundation of the Library of Congress, the Alexander String Quartet, XTET, and the San Francisco Contemporary Music Players.

A number of his works have been performed in New York City, San Francisco, Los Angeles, Chicago, Great Britain, Ireland, Italy, Greece, and the Netherlands. His music was published by the now defunct Fallen Leaf Press and CPP/Belwin (now part of Alfred Publishing Company) and is recorded on the Innova Recordings label.

Greenberg has lectured for some of the most prestigious musical and arts organizations in the United States. He is the resident composer and music historian for National Public Radio's Weekend All Things Considered.

Greenberg has recorded a number of lecture series for The Great Courses on music history and the appreciation of music. He often relates musical topics to other subjects, such as history and politics, as well as to music from other periods. Referring to Greenberg's lively style and sense of humor, the Bangor Daily News has described him as "the Elvis of music history and appreciation."

He is an artistic adviser at Composers, Inc.

== Selected compositions ==
A complete list of compositions is given on the composer's official web site. Selected compositions and notes are given below:

- Breaths, Voices and Cadenze (1981) String quartet No. 1
- By various means (1983) for clarinet quartet
  - Passacaglia
  - Theme and variations
  - Chaconne
- Quasi un madrigale (1985) four Italian songs for soprano and piano
  - Il palatino / Aldo Palazzeschi
  - Poesia d'amore / Salvatore Quasímodo
  - La trombettina / Corrado Govoni
  - Quasi un madrigale / Salvatore Quasímodo
- Child's Play (1988) String quartet No. 2 "...which captures the imaginative and playful energy of his daughter Rachel (then two years old)."
  1. Games (fast) 8:06
  2. Intermezzo: Dreams of Gold (Sogni d'oro) (slow) 5:35
  3. Dances (very fast) 6:51
- The Passing Years (1989) five songs for baritone and piano
  - God gave me
  - East Broadway
  - The passing years
  - Rabbi Elimelech
  - At my wedding
- It Don't Mean a Thing (1990) for percussion sextet "...combines the sounds and style of Japanese Taiko drumming with the rhythmic swing of Duke Ellington."
- In Shape (1990) concerto in three movements for two pianos and marimba
  - Wedge
  - Labyrinth
  - Spike
- Dude ‘Tudes (1991) for solo piano "...attempts to transfer into sound some of the many moods and activities of his 22-month-old son Samuel."
  1. Orneriness/Contrary motion
  2. Building blocks/Chords 'n' stuff
  3. Dreams of play/Trills and tremolos
  4. Dancin' fool/Quarter-minute waltz
  5. Angel's hair/Legato
  6. Cruisin' with the dude/Octaves-R-Us.
- Iron balconies and lilies (1992) for flute, oboe, clarinet, violin, viola, violoncello, soprano, and piano
  - Prelude: A city by the sea / Anna Margolin
  - Youth: Hay mowing / Moyshe Kulbak; When Grandma, may she rest in peace, died / Moyshe Kulbak
  - Love songs: Longing / Rachel Korn; Ancient murdress night / Anna Margolin
  - Children: If I had the Emperor's might, Lullaby / Traditional Folk song; Toys / Abraham Sutskever
  - Age: Old age / Jacob Gladstein; Rest / Jacob Isaac segal
- On Trial (1994) concerto for solo vibraphone, flute, clarinet, bassoon, piano, violin, viola, and violoncello
- Among Friends (1995) String quartet No. 3. Commissioned by the Koussevitzky Foundation
- Funny Like a Monkey (2001) for piano quartet (string trio PLUS piano) "...coined by my 15-year-old daughter in order to address ... attempts at humor by both her younger brother and her hopelessly antiquated father."
  1. Knock Yourself Out
  2. Flutterby
  3. Morph (with apologies to J. B.)

== Lecture series ==
- How to listen to and understand great music: 48 lectures (The Teaching Company, 3rd edition, 2006: 12 DVDs)
