= On an Overgrown Path =

Set of piano pieces by Leoš Janáček

- Piano pieces by Leoš Janáček
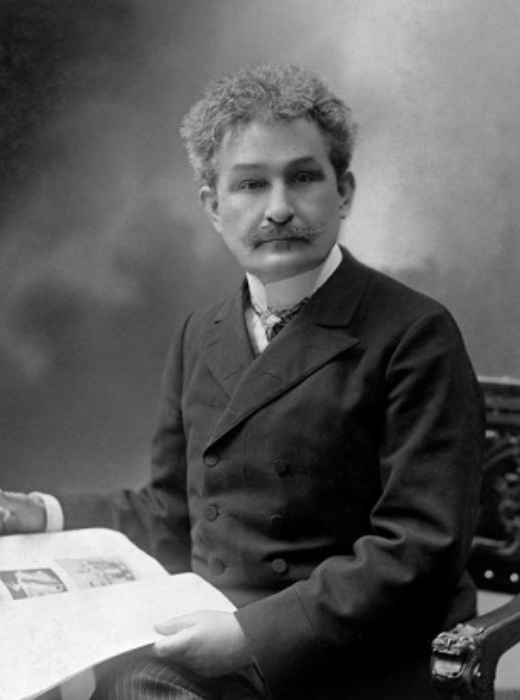
- Janáček in 1904
- Native name: Czech: Po zarostlém chodníčku
- Composed: 1900–1911
- Performed: 6 January 1905: Brno
- Published: 1911 / 1942
- Movements: 15 in two volumes

On an Overgrown Path (Czech: Po zarostlém chodníčku) is a cycle of fifteen piano pieces written by Leoš Janáček and organized into two volumes.

== Background ==
Janáček composed all his most important works for solo piano between 1900 and 1912. He probably began preparing his first series of Moravian folk melodies in 1900. At this time, the cycle had only six pieces, intended for harmonium: Our evenings, A blown-away leaf, The Frýdek Madonna, Good night!, The barn owl has not flown away! and a Piu mosso published after Janáček’s death. These melodies provided the basis for the first volume of On an Overgrown Path. Three of these compositions were first published in 1901 with the fifth volume of harmonium pieces, Slavic melodies, under the title On an overgrown path – three short compositions. By 1908 the cycle had grown to nine pieces, and was by then intended for piano instead of harmonium. The definitive version of the first book was published in 1911. On 30 September 1911, Janáček published the first piece of the second series in the Lidové noviny newspapers. The new series was created, in its entirety, around 1911. The complete second book was printed by the Hudební matice in 1942. The première of the work took place on 6 January 1905 at the "Besední dům" Hall in Brno.

== Structure ==
Series I

1. Naše večery (Our Evenings) (1900)
2. Lístek odvanutý (A Blown-Away Leaf) (1900)
3. Pojďte s námi! (Come With Us!) (1908)
4. Frýdecká panna Maria (The Madonna of Frydek) (1900)
5. Štěbetaly jak laštovičky (They Chattered Like Swallows) (1911)
6. Nelze domluvit! (Words Fail!) (1908)
7. Dobrou noc! (Good Night!) (1900)
8. Tak neskonale úzko (Unutterable Anguish) (1911)
9. V pláči (In Tears) (1908)
10. Sýček neodletěl! (The Barn Owl Has Not Flown Away!) (1900)

Series II

1. Andante (1911)
2. Allegretto (1911)

Series II supplement (paralipomena) — not authorized by the composer for publication

1. Più mosso (1900)
2. Vivo (1900)
3. Allegro (1911)

== Earliest version / manuscript ==
After intensive studies of various sources, the German pianist Lars David Kellner published the first version of the 'overgrown path' on his 2013 Janacek album ('The complete original works for piano'), using the earliest sources for Book I and Janacek's original manuscript for Book II. Kellner also includes this version of the piano cycle in his recitals.

== Arrangements ==
- For violin and piano, by Jan Štědroň, performed by Yuriko Kuronuma, Alfred Holeček
- For cello and piano, by Miloš Sádlo, performed by Miloš Sádlo, Alfred Holeček
- For cello and piano, by František Smetana, performed by František Smetana, Jiří Hubička
- For cymbalom, by Petr Oliva, performed by Petr Oliva
- For cymbalom, by Helena Červenková, performed by Helena Červenková
- For cymbalom, by Daniel Skála, performed by Daniel Skála
- For accordion, by Daniela Wagner, performed by Daniela Wagner
- For accordion, by Ivan Koval, performed by Ivan Koval
- For accordion, by Teodoro Anzellott, performed by Teodoro Anzellott
- For accordion and piano, by Stefan Heucke, performed by Marko Kassl, Tobias Bredohl
- For harp, by Chantal Mathieu, performed by Chantal Mathieu
- For guitar, by Martin Bresnick, performed by Benjamin Verdery
- For flute and guitar, by Jiří Jirmal and Miloslav Klaus, performed by Jan Riedlbauch, Miloslav Klaus
- For guitar quartet, by David Scarth, performed by York Guitar Quartet, David Ashworth, Andrew Forrest, John Mackenzie, David Scarth
- For guitar quartet, by Marek Velemínský, performed by Prague Guitar Quartet
- For guitar, keyboard and orchestra, by Jan Hála, performed by Lubomír Brabec, Jan Hála, Karel Vágner Orchestra, conducted by Karel Vágner
- For oboe quartet, by Zurich Oboe Quartet, performed by Zurich Oboe Quartet
- For wind ensemble, by Ronald Karten, performed by Netherlands Wind Ensemble
- For string quartet, by Jarmil Burghauser performed by Quartetto Energie Nove
- For string orchestra, by Jarmil Burghauser, performed by London Jupiter Orchestra, conducted by Gregory Rose
- For chamber orchestra, by Martin Bresnick, performed by the Saint Paul Chamber Orchestra, conducted by Christopher Hogwood
- For string orchestra, by Daniel Rumier, with texts by Maia Brami, performed by Camerata Zurich, Igor Karsko, director.

== In popular culture ==
Some movements were used in the soundtrack for the 1988 American film The Unbearable Lightness of Being.
