= Ion Corvin =

Ion Corvin may refer to:

- John Hunyadi, Voivode of Transylvania, captain-general and regent of the Kingdom of Hungary (Ion Corvin is a Romanian variant of his name)
- Ion Corvin, Constanța, a commune in Constanţa County, Romania
