= Dana Wilson (composer) =

American composer, jazz pianist and teacher (b.1946)

Dana Richard Wilson (born 1946) is an American composer, jazz pianist, and teacher.

He grew up in Wilton, CT, and holds a B.A. from Bowdoin College, an M.A. from the University of Connecticut, and a doctorate from the Eastman School of Music. He is Charles A. Dana Professor Emeritus at the Ithaca College School of Music. and resides in Ithaca, New York with his wife Louise Mygatt, also a musician. Their children reside with their families in Boston, Los Angeles, Eugene (OR), and Seattle.

The works of Dana Wilson have been commissioned and performed by such diverse ensembles as the Chicago Chamber Musicians, Formosa Quartet, Canadian Brass, Detroit Chamber Winds and Strings, Buffalo Philharmonic, Xiamen Symphony, Netherlands Wind Ensemble, Syracuse Symphony, and Tokyo Kosei Wind Orchestra. Solo works have been written for many soloists, including hornists Gail Williams and Adam Unsworth; clarinetists Larry Combs and Richard MacDowell; trumpeters James Thompson, Rex Richardson, and Frank Campos; flutists Wendy Mehne and Kate Steinbeck; oboists David Weiss and Michael Henoch; bassoonists Michael Kroth and Christin Schillinger; saxophonists Steven Mauk and Jamal Rossi; bassist Nicholas Walker, trombonist Tom Ashworth; and pianist Nick Weiser.

He has received grants from, among others, the National Endowment for the Arts, New York Foundation for the Arts, New England Foundation for the Arts, New York State Council for the Arts, Arts Midwest, and Meet the Composer. His compositions have been performed throughout the United States, Europe, and East Asia. They have received several prizes, including the Sudler International Composition Prize and the Ostwald Composition Prize, as well as awards from the International Trumpet Guild and the International Horn Society. His music can be heard on over twenty recording labels; recordings include a CD devoted his music for flute by Wendy Mehne, and one devoted to his music for saxophone by Steven Mauk. His flute concerto "The Conjurer" was recently awarded the "Best New Work for Flute" by the Flute New Music Consortium.

Dana Wilson is co-author of Contemporary Choral Arranging, published by Prentice Hall/Simon and Schuster, and has written articles on diverse musical subjects. He has been a Yaddo Fellow (at Yaddo, the artists’ retreat in Saratoga Springs, New York), a Wye Fellow at the Aspen Institute, a Charles A. Dana Fellow, and a Fellow at the Society for Humanities, Cornell University.
