= Leonora Milà Romeu =

Catalan pianist and composer

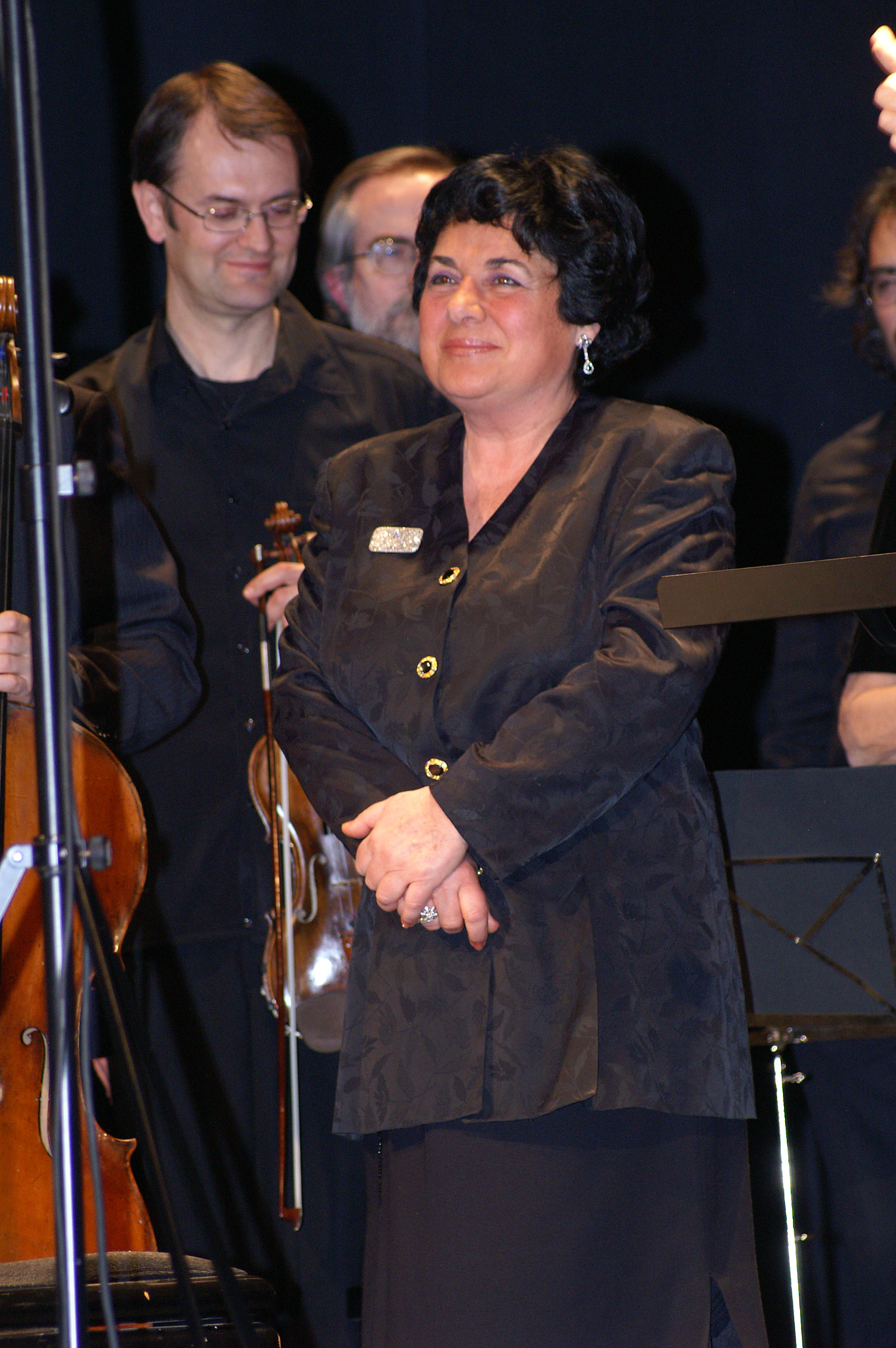

Leonora Milà Romeu (Vilanova i la Geltrú, 1942) is a Catalan pianist and composer.

== Biography ==
The pianist and composer Leonora Milà was born in Vilanova i la Geltrú (Barcelona) in 1942, into a family with close ties to the world of music. Her father, Josep Milà, was a cellist in the Orquestra Pau Casals and the Orquestra del Gran Teatre del Liceu de Barcelona. A disciple of pedagogue Maria Canals, Leonora Milà was dubbed a "child prodigy" in the wake of two concerts she performed in the Palau de la Música Catalana in 1949. Whilst just six years old, she interpreted a piece that she herself had composed, along with Wolfgang Amadeus Mozart's concerto KV488 for piano and orchestra, accompanied by the Orquestra Ciutat de Barcelona.

She started her international career at the age of 12, when she performed piano works by Enric Granados and Manuel de Falla on a BBC London television programme. She returned a year later, in 1955, to interpret composer Manuel de Falla's Nights in the Gardens of Spain in the Royal Albert Hall, performing alongside a London Philharmonic Orchestra conducted by Rudolph Dunbar.

Winner of the 1966 Maria Canals International Music Competition (Barcelona) and finalist of the Concorso Internazionale Viotti (Vercelli, Italy), Leonora Milà has managed to combine, throughout her professional career, her abilities as both a performer and composer. Lengthy tours across Europe, the United States and Asia led her to become the first Spanish artist to perform in the People's Republic of China (1979), to record an album with the China National Symphony Orchestra (1988) and to become the first female composer to premiere a ballet in St. Petersburg. The ballet in question was Tirant lo Blanc, a chivalric novel written by Joanot Martorell in the 15th century, subsequently scored by Leonora Milà and transformed into a two-hour ballet by Russian dancer and choreographer Yuri Petukhov. For her efforts, Milà was awarded the International Catalan Culture Prize in Valencia (1995). Later on, in 1996, Tirant lo Blanc was premiered in the Gran Teatre del Liceu by the St. Petersburg State Ballet company. Motion picture director Antoni Ribas was in charge of filming the ballet, later aired on Televisión Española and released to the public on DVD.

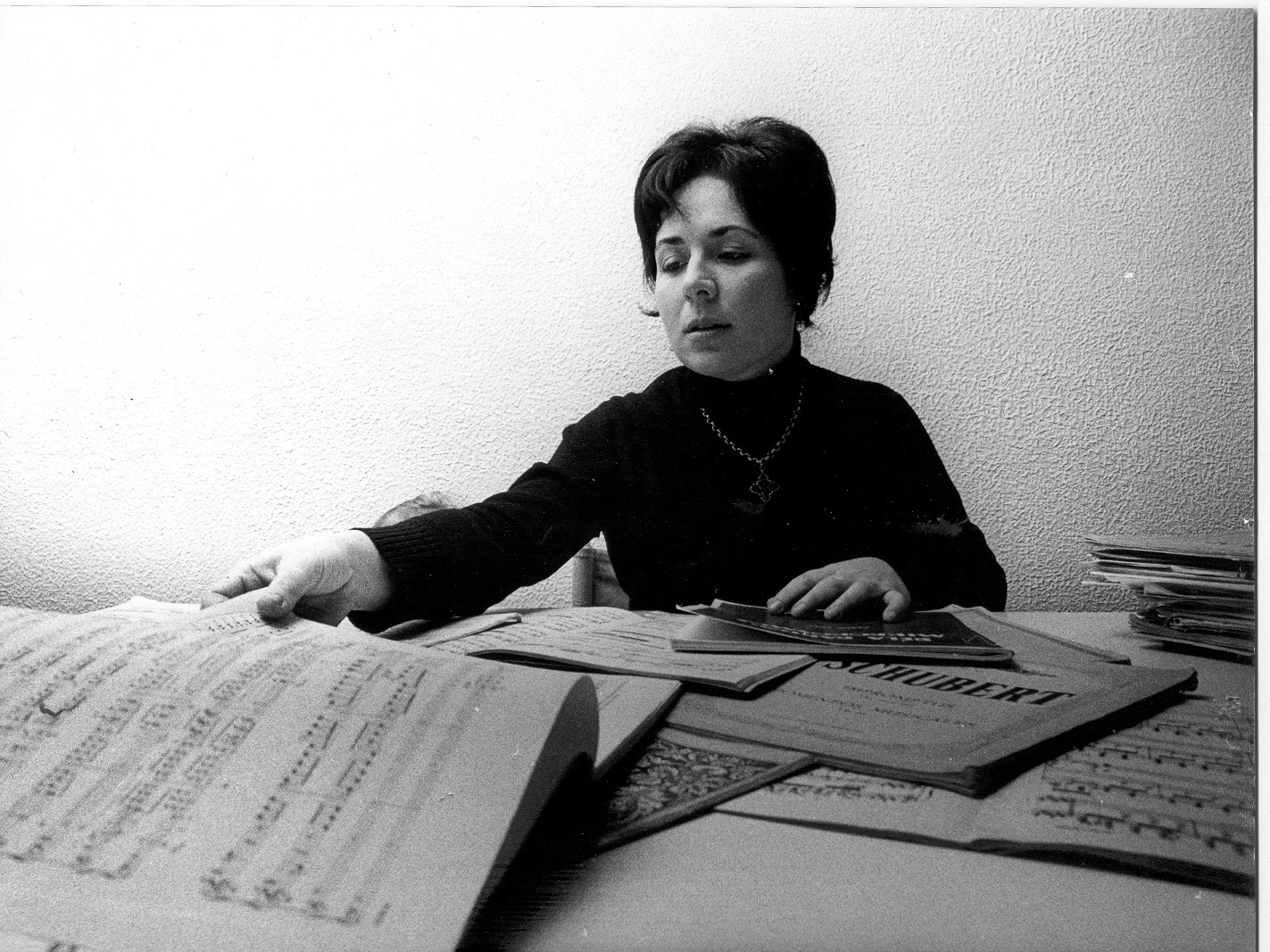
The pianist and composer Leonora Milà looks for a score

While Leonora Milà boasts a considerable written catalogue comprising over 100 scores, her four concertos for piano and orchestra shine forth; as do the popular Habaneras piano recordings, the songs for voice and piano based on texts by poets the likes of Johann Wolfgang von Goethe, Salvador Espriu and Joan Maragall and two short ballets entitled The Flight of Painter Lee and Drame à trois, both recorded for the St Petersburg State Symphony Orchestra of the Mussorgsky Theatre.

Leonora Milà has released over thirty albums as both a soloist and accompanied by internationally renowned orchestras. Her repertoire includes compositions by master European composers such as Maurice Ravel, Claude Debussy, Ludwig van Beethoven, Robert Schumann and Felix Mendelssohn. She has received particular acclaim for her rendition of Das Wohltemperierte Klavier by J. S. Bach, deemed referential by the specialised press, as well as piano interpretations of the classic Spanish composers Manuel de Falla, Enric Granados, Isaac Albéniz and Joaquín Turina, earning her unanimous public recognition.

Leonora Milà's works are published and distributed by International Music Company (New York) and DINSC Publicacions Musicals (Barcelona).

== Selected discography ==
- Piano concertos (Maurice Ravel. 1973)
- Manuel de Falla tribute (1976)
- Carnaval (Robert Schumann. 1978)
- Piano Works (C. Debussy, L. Milà. 1981)
- Das Wohltemperierte Klavier (J. S. Bach. 1983)
- Spanish music for piano and orchestra (Falla, Milà, Turina i Guridi. 1986)
- Spanish Music (Falla, Turina, Guridi, Milà. 1986)
- Triple Concerto (L. van Beethoven. 1990)
- Tirant lo Blanc Ballet (L. Milà. 1992)
- Habaneras for piano (L. Milà. 1992)
- Piano works (Manuel de Falla i Enric Granados. 1994)
- Inventionen und Sinfonien (J. S. Bach. 1996)
- Music for two choreographies (L. Milà. 2000)
- Milà plays Falla (Manuel de Falla. 2009)
- Piano Works (Schumann & Mendelssohn. 2013)

== Orchestras and groups ==
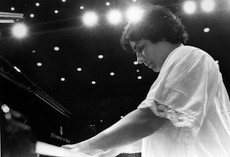
Leonora Milà in a concert in Hong Kong

- London Philharmonic Orchestra
- Liverpool Philharmonic Orchestra
- Orchestre de la Suisse Romande
- Hong Kong Philharmonic Orchestra
- Orchestre National de l'Opéra de Monte-Carlo
- Orquesta Sinfónica de Radiotelevisión Española
- Orquestra Simfònica de Barcelona i Nacional de Catalunya
- Manila Symphony Orchestra
- Saint Petersburg State Symphony Orchestra of Mussorgsky Theatre
- Central Philharmonic of China (China National Symphony Orchestra)
- China National Chamber Orchestra
- Paderewski Philharmonic Orchestra
- Staatsorchester Braunschweig
- Perth Symphony Orchestra
- Dundee Philharmonic Orchestra
- North Staffordshire Symphony Orchestra
- Gävleborgs Symfoniorkester
- Orkiestra Symfoniczna Filharmonii Lódzkiej
- Orkiestra Symfoniczna Filharmonii Rybnicka
- Orkiestra Symfoniczna Filharmonii Poznańskiej
- Camerata Eduard Toldrà
- The Arctic Chamber Orchestra of Alaska
- Orquesta Sinfónica de Navarra Pablo Sarasate
- The Slovak State Philharmonic Kosice
- Orchestre Du Domaine Musical
- Berliner Streichquintett
- Quartet de Barcelona

== Conductors ==
- Eduard Toldrà
- Jacques Bodmer
- Jonas Alber
- Rudolph Dunbar
- Li Delun
- Moshe Atzmon
- Pierre Colombo
- Bela de Csillery
- Renard Czajkowski
- Miguel Ángel Gómez Martínez
- Han Zhongjie
- Joan Pich Santasusana
- John Pritchard
- Alun Francis
- En Shao
- Gordon Wright
- Brian Wright
- Radomil Eliska
- Urs Voegelin
- Salvador Brotons

== Bibliography ==
- Albert Mallofré: "Retrat de Leonora Milà" (2002). Published for the Ajuntament de Vilanova i la Geltrú

== Links ==
- Official website of Leonora Milà
- Official website of Catalan Composers Association
- Website of CatClàssica
- Website of El far blau produccions SL. Independent Catalan production company responsible of "Leonora Milà. The Intuitively Talented" (documentary).
