= Jupiter String Quartet =

American string quartet

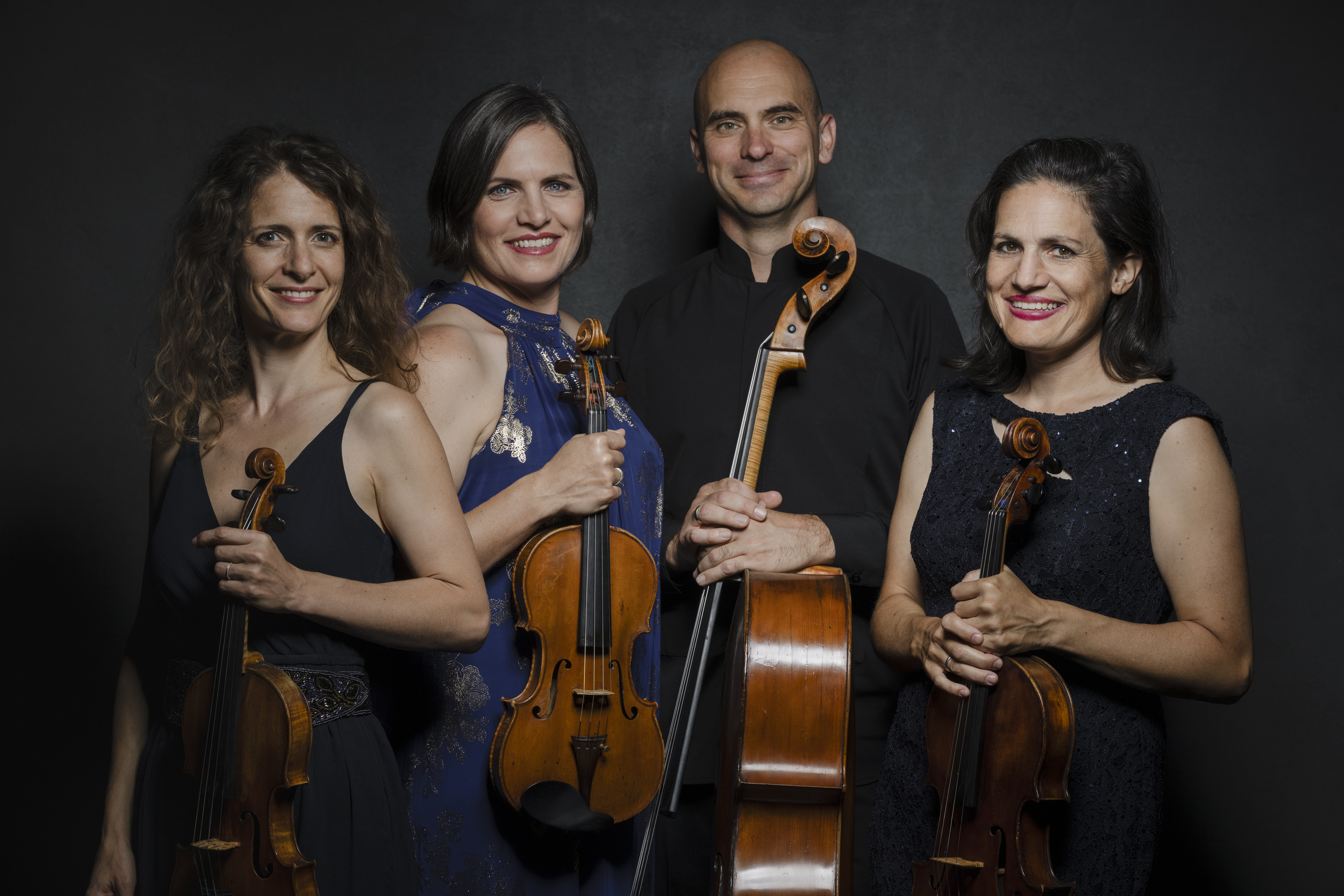

Background information
- Origin: United States
- Genres: Classical
- Years active: 2001–present
- Members: Mélanie Clapiès (violin); Meg Freivogel (violin); Liz Freivogel (viola); Daniel McDonough (cello)
- Past members: Nelson Lee (violin)
- Website: www.jupiterquartet.com

The Jupiter String Quartet (sometimes referred to as the Jupiter Quartet) is an American classical music ensemble founded in 2001. It is a string quartet consisting of Mélanie Clapiès (violin); sisters Meg Freivogel (violin) and Liz Freivogel (viola); and Daniel McDonough (cello), who is Meg Freivogel's husband.

They perform worldwide and direct the chamber music program at the University of Illinois Urbana-Champaign, where they have been quartet-in-residence since 2012. They have premiered many works by contemporary composers, and released more than a dozen albums, including live recordings and recordings with collaborators such as Jeremy Denk.

== Founding and early recognition ==
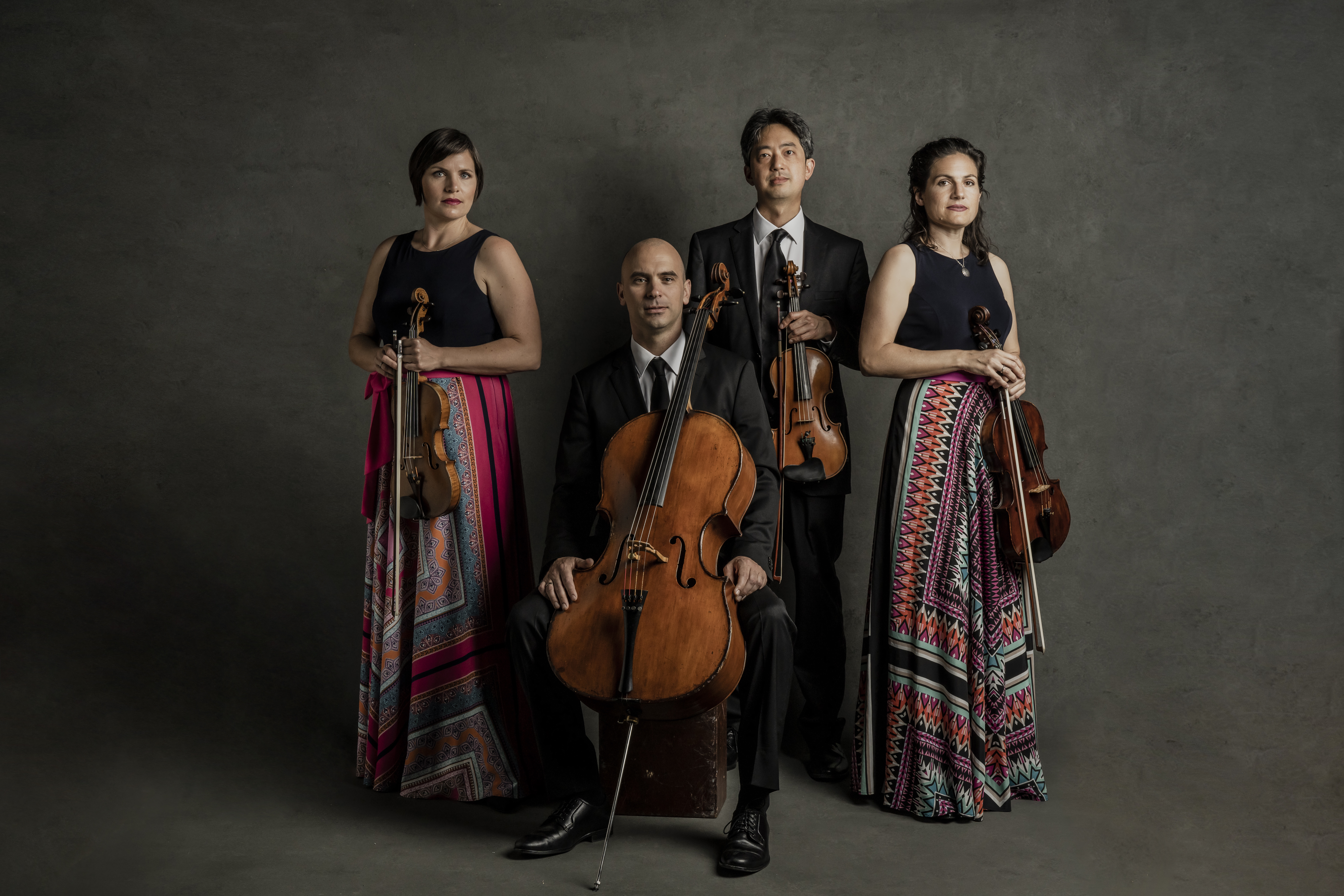
Quartet members (2001 to 2025). From left: Meg Freivogel, Daniel McDonough, Nelson Lee and Liz Freivogel

The members of the quartet studied with members of the Cleveland Quartet and at the Aspen Music Festival and School. They formed the Jupiter String Quartet in 2001, in Cleveland. adopting their name because the planet Jupiter was the most prominent planet in the night sky at the time of their formation, and because Jupiter's astrological symbol is similar to the number four.

Having spent formative summers of 2003 and 2004 on fellowships at the Aspen Music Festival's Center for Advanced Quartet Studies, in years since they have returned to Aspen to teach newer classes of fellows. During the 2000s they were based at the New England Conservatory in Boston.

In 2004 they won the grand prize at the Banff International String Quartet Competition and the grand prize at the Fischoff National Chamber Music Competition, and in 2005 won the Young Concert Artists International auditions. In 2007 they won Chamber Music America's Cleveland Quartet Award, and in 2008 received an Avery Fisher Career Grant.

In 2010 The New Yorker wrote that they were "a new group that plays with both technical finesse and rare expressive maturity."

== Residencies, touring, recording ==
From 2007 to 2010 the Jupiter String Quartet held a residency at the Chamber Music Two series of the Chamber Music Society of Lincoln Center. Since 2012 they have held a residency at the University of Illinois Urbana-Champaign.

The quartet has performed in North and South America, Europe, and Asia at venues including Lincoln Center, Carnegie Hall, the Kennedy Center, the Library of Congress, Wigmore Hall, Boston's Jordan Hall, the Palacio de Bellas Artes in Mexico City, Esterhazy Palace, the Kimmel Center in Philadelphia presented by the Philadelphia Chamber Music Society, Maverick Concerts in Woodstock multiple times, and the Seoul Arts Center. They have appeared at music festivals including the Banff Centre, the Seoul Spring Festival, the Aspen Music Festival and School, the Rockport Music Festival multiple times beginning in 2009, multiple times at the Cape Cod Chamber Music Festival beginning in 2005, Bowdoin International Music Festival, Music@Menlo, Caramoor International Music Festival, West Cork Chamber Music Festival, Yellow Barn Festival, Encore Chamber Music Festival, and Chamber Music Athens.

Their recordings, many of them on Marquis Records, include music by classical, modern, and contemporary composers, including Beethoven, Mendelssohn, Fauré, Shostakovich, Ravel, Chausson, Gunther Schuller, Benjamin Britten, Osvaldo Golijov, Dan Visconti, Su Lian Tan, and Stephen Andrew Taylor. Their three live "Music@Menlo" recordings in the "Maps and Legends" series include music by Poulenc, Turina, Debussy, Dvořák, Gershwin, Milhaud, Aaron Copland, Samuel Barber, Harry Burleigh, William Bolcom, and others.

== 2009–2018: Premieres ==
In 2009 the Jupiter String Quartet premiered Ramshackle Songs, a piece by composer Dan Visconti commissioned by the Fromm Foundation.

In 2013 they premiered Total Internal Reflection by Hannah Lash at the Great Lakes Chamber Music Festival and gave, with Thomas Hampson, the Boston premiere of Aristotle by Mark Adamo, which had been commissioned for the Jupiter and Hampson.

In 2015 they premiered the String Quartet No. 7 of Canadian-American composer Sydney Hodkinson.

In 2018 they gave the world premiere of "Imprimatur" by Kati Agócs at the Aspen Music Festival and School. Their 2019 album Alchemy featured world premiere recordings of three pieces: Pierre Jalbert’s Piano Quintet; Steven Stuckey’s Piano Quartet; and the Fantasia for Piano Quintet by Carl Vine.

== 2019–present: More premieres, touring ==
In 2019 the Jupiter collaborated with pianist Bernadette Harvey on the album Alchemy, which included four commissions of Arizona Friends of Chamber Music, three of which were world premiere recordings. In 2020 the quartet marked Beethoven's 250th-anniversary year with a series of Beethoven concerts and released an album, Metamorphosis, that paired Beethoven's Op. 131 with the String Quartet No. 1 of Ligeti.

In July 2020 at the height of the COVID-19 pandemic they livestreamed the world premiere of To Unpathed Waters, Undreamed Shores by Michi Wiancko, a piece that had been commissioned for them, and the following year they premiered Chaconne/Labyrinth by Stephen Andrew Taylor, a piece meant to convey the experience of the pandemic.

Their 2021 collaborative album with the Jasper String Quartet included the world premiere recording of Eternal Breath by Dan Visconti, a piece eliciting breath "that is passed from one generation to another" –– and written for the 40th wedding anniversary of Meg, Liz and J Freivogel's parents. The Arts Fuse called the album "striking for its backstory but really memorable for its smart program and fine execution."

On October 3, 2023 the Jupiter premiered Medusa, which Nathan Shields had written for them during a Guggenheim Fellowship. The same month, with marimba player William Moersch, they premiered Rock Galaxy by Zack Browning.

In 2025, they announced that Nelson Lee was leaving the Jupiter to take a position in Montreal. Violinist Mélanie Clapiès took his place in the quartet. Their first concert with the new lineup took place on March 12, 2026 at the Krannert Center for the Performing Arts.

In addition to their extensive touring schedule, the Jupiter continues to perform at the Krannert Center for the Performing Arts at the University of Illinois where they are quartet-in-residence, and at the Cleveland Chamber Music Society in the city of their founding.

== Awards and honors ==
- 2004: Grand prize, Banff International String Quartet Competition
- 2004: Grand prize, Fischoff National Chamber Music Competition
- 2005: Winner, Young Concert Artists International auditions
- 2007: Cleveland Quartet Award from Chamber Music America
- 2008: Avery Fisher Career Grant
- 2009: Fromm Foundation grant to commission a quartet from composer Dan Visconti

== Discography ==
Album	Release Date	Label	Collaborator(s)
Felix Mendelssohn: Octet in E-flat major, Op. 20; Dan Visconti: Eternal Breath; Osvaldo Golijov: Last Round	5 February 2021	Marquis Records	Jasper String Quartet
Metamorphosis	12 June 2020	Marquis Records	
Alchemy	10 May 2019	Marquis Records	Bernadette Harvey
Revelations	16 June 2017	Arsis Audio	Bruce Brubaker
Windows in Time (Chamber Music for Horn and Strings)	1 May 2017	Opening Day Entertainment	Bernhard Scully, Rebecca Gitter
Rootsongs	30 September 2016	Azica	Ollie Watts Davis
Ravel: Intimate Masterpieces	29 October 2013	Oberlin Music	Ellie Dehn, Richard Hawkins, Yolanda Kondonassis, Spencer Myer, Alexa Still
Music@Menlo Live: – Maps & Legends Discs V, VI, VII	14 December 2010	Music@Menlo	Various
Mendelssohn: Quartet, Op. Post. 80; Beethoven: String Quartet, Op. 135	15 September 2009	Marquis Music	
Chausson: Concert in D major; Fauré: Violin Sonata No. 1 (EP)	8 July 2008		Soovin Kim, Jeremy Denk
Shostakovich: Quartet No. 3; Britten: Quartet No. 2	8 November 2007	Marquis Music	
