= Ladislav Kupkovič =

Slovak composer and conductor

Ladislav Kupkovič (17 March 1936 – 15 June 2016) was a Slovak composer and conductor.

== Life ==
Kupkovič was born in Bratislava, and studied violin and conducting there, first at the conservatory, then at the Academy of Performing Arts. He played violin in the Slovak Philharmonic Orchestra from 1960 to 1965, and then began to write music for television and film to make a living. At the same time, he was writing more experimental music for concerts. In 1969 he won a music scholarship to West Berlin, and emigrated there the following year. In 1971, he conducted the premiere of Karlheinz Stockhausen's Mixtur in Cologne, a piece dedicated to Kupkovič himself. In the same year, he began to teach music theory at the Hochschule für Musik und Theater Hannover, and lived in Haste near Hannover until his death. During the 1970s he was associated with the Cologne School (Kapko-Foretić 1980, 50).

== Wandelkonzerte ==
Kupkovič has probably become best known for his experiments with the concert form in the 1970s. In Musik für das Ruhrfestspielhaus (1970), he arranged forty performers to play a number of pieces in a concert hall in Recklinghausen over the course of three hours. The pieces were played in various parts of the building, some of them at the same time. Kupkovič called this kind of concert a Wandelkonzert (meaning "walking concert"), and Wandelkonzerte have often invited comparisons to John Cage's Musicircus events. The idea was expanded for Klanginvasion auf Bonn (1971), for which 150 musicians played at various venues in Bonn over the course of twelve hours. There is some similarity here to Trevor Wishart's community pieces like Forest Singularity.

Some of the music played in the Wandelkonzerte was written by Kupkovič himself, some of it by other people. Much of it, however, was music by older classical composers which had been altered and adapted by Kupkovič. This process is typical of Kupkovič's instrumental works, and can be seen in such pieces as the series of four Präparierte Texte from 1968. These pieces take quite insignificant parts from well-known pieces of the past, such as the viola or bass drum parts, and isolate them, thus making central music which in its original context was incidental and often barely audible. Präparierter Text 1 is adapted from the second movement of Brahms' Symphony No. 1, and is for violin and magnetic tape; Präparierter Text 2 is adapted from the first movement of Mozart's Jupiter Symphony (No. 41), and is for flute, trumpet, timpani, violin, cello and double bass; Präparierter Text 3 is adapted from the fourth movement of Beethoven's Symphony No. 9, and is for cymbal, bass drum and magnetic tape; and Präparierter Text 4 is adapted from the Ricercar a 6 from Johann Sebastian Bach's Musical Offering and is for chamber orchestra (a version for full orchestra followed in 1970).

== Musical style ==
Kupkovič also adapted old pieces by taking small elements from them and repeating them with only slight variation. This technique was used in Morceau de Genre based on a small piece for violin and piano by Edward Elgar. It exists in versions for violin, trumpet, timpani and strings; solo piano; violin and piano; solo accordion; and violin and accordion. The constant repetition of two-bar figures from the original piece with very little variation is either extremely witty or extremely irritating, depending on the point of view.

Kupkovič is one of the few composers to have written a significant amount of music for the accordion. As well as the versions of Morceau de Genre, he has written 312-SL / 723 (1978) for two accordions, and in 1980 wrote a concerto for the instrument. This concerto was in the later diatonic style which Kupkovič turned to. The harmonies in these later pieces are very simple, and the works have sometimes been compared to Wolfgang Amadeus Mozart. Kupkovič has been extremely prolific in this style.

Although a return to a simpler form of harmony and to older musical forms may be seen as a kind of neo-classicism, it is a very different sort to that used by Igor Stravinsky. Unlike his music, Kupkovič's has no sense of irony and in many cases could be confused for a piece from the classical music era. The composer Gavin Bryars has said of these works that "there is a sense of peering into the past through a distorting lens that manages to reveal a clear picture, but a picture that never existed until the lens was put in place".

== Recordings of his works ==
Many of Kupkovič's pieces have been recorded. His short piece for violin and piano from 1968, Souvenir, has been recorded several times, most recently by Gidon Kremer. Some recent works are published by Tre Media Musikverlage in Karlsruhe. The Slovak label Diskant has recorded several works by Kupkovič for string quartet: Initials for String Quartet, String Quartet in B major No. 7, and Quintet for Accordion and String Quartet (Moyzes Quartet, Boris Lenko accordion: DK 0112-2131), for violin and piano: Sonatina in D major No. 3, Theme and 13 Variations, Sonata in F minor No. 5, Armenian Songs from Garin, March in F major, Double March in G major, Compliment, Talisman, Souvenir (Czechoslovak Chamber Duo - Pavel Burdych, violin and Zuzana Berešová, piano: DK0167-2131), as well as a number of pieces for cello.
