= Viano =

Viano may refer to:

- Mercedes-Benz Viano, a large people carrier manufactured by Mercedes-Benz
- Viano, Graubünden, a settlement in the municipality of Brusio and canton of Graubünden, Switzerland
- Viano, Reggio Emilia, a town and commune in the province of Reggio Emilia and region of Emilia-Romagna, Italy
- Viano Quartet, Canadian-American string quartet
- Richardson Viano (born 2002), French-Haitian alpine skier
