= Diego Suarez =

Diego Suarez or Diego-Suarez may refer to:

- Antsiranana, a city in Madagascar formerly known as Diego-Suarez
- Diogo Soares (explorer), also spelled Diego Suarez, 16th-century Portuguese navigator and explorer
- Diego Suárez (soldier) (1552–1623), Spanish soldier and chronicler of the wars with the Moors
- Diego Suarez (garden designer) (1888–1974), Colombian-born American garden designer of the gardens at Villa Vizcaya
- Diego Orlando Suárez (born 1992), Bolivian footballer
