= Alexander String Quartet =

The Alexander String Quartet is a string quartet based in San Francisco. Formed in New York in 1981, the Alexander String Quartet has since 1989 been Ensemble in Residence of San Francisco Performances.

In 1982, the Alexander String Quartet was the first string quartet to win the Concert Artists Guild competition. In 1985, the Alexander String Quartet was the first American string quartet to win the Portsmouth International String Quartet Competition (now the Wigmore Hall International String Quartet Competition), winning both the audience prize and the jury's highest prize.

On 7 April 2023, The Alexander String Quartet released an album entitled "British Invasion" with classical guitarist William Kanengiser.

== Members ==
- Zakarias Grafilo, first violin
- Yuna Lee, second violin
- David Samuel, viola
- Sandy Wilson, cello

—

- Paul Yarbrough, viola (emeritus, co-founder)

== See also ==
- List of string quartet ensembles
