= Valea Mare (Danube) =

Tributary of the Danube River in Romania

- Location within Romania

Location
- Country: Romania
- Counties: Constanța County
- Villages: Cetatea, Văleni, Rariștea, Viile

Physical characteristics
- Mouth: Danube
  - location: Dunăreni
  - coordinates: 44.2161°N 27.7691°E
- Length: 29 km (18 mi)
- Basin size: 344 km^{2} (133 sq mi)

Basin features
- Progression: Danube→ Black Sea
- Tributaries
  - left: Dobromir, Negureni
  - right: Corvin, Valea Floriilor
- River code: XIV.1.39a

The Valea Mare (also: Valea Negrenilor) is a right tributary of the Danube in Romania. It passes through Lake Dunăreni and flows into the Danube near Dunăreni. Its length is 29 km (18 mi) and its basin size is 344 km^{2} (133 sq mi).
