= Isabelle Flory =

French musician

Isabelle Flory (born 1951) is a French violinist.

She was a student of Yehudi Menuhin, Joseph Gingold, and Henryk Szeryng. She has won numerous prizes, including the Jacques Thibaud International competition in 1971 and the Carl Flesch International competition in 1977.

She studied three years in Moscow and two years at the Guildhall School of Music in London.

Back in Paris, she founded the Ensemble Arpeggione and, six years later, the Arpeggione Quartet.
