= Addicott Summer Chamber Music Festival =

Chamber music festival in Indiana, US

- Established: 2025
- Founders: Euclid Quartet: Jameson Cooper, Aviva Hakanoglu, Luis Enrique Vargas, Justin Goldsmith
- Type: Chamber music
- Location: South Bend, Indiana, U.S.
- Affiliations: Indiana University South Bend
- Website: www.addicottchambermusicfestival.com

The Addicott Summer Chamber Music Festival is an American chamber music festival based in South Bend, Indiana, that presents public performances by professional string quartets and provides chamber music education and performance opportunities for students ages 15 to 24. The festival was founded and is directed by the Euclid Quartet, the resident string quartet of Indiana University South Bend. It is held annually on the campus of Indiana University South Bend.

== History ==
The Addicott Summer Chamber Music Festival was established in 2025 at Indiana University South Bend in memory of Georgina Joshi and Louise E. Addicott through a founding gift from Joan and Yatish Joshi. The festival is also supported through other grants and donations.

== Educational program ==
The festival's educational program is a 10-day chamber music intensive held each July at Indiana University South Bend. It brings together approximately two dozen advanced violin, viola, and cello students, ages 15–24, along with preformed string quartets.

Participants receive daily coaching from members of the Euclid Quartet and guest professional string quartets. The program also includes masterclasses and public performances at Indiana University South Bend, the St. Joseph County Public Library, the Civil Rights Heritage Center, and the Howard Park Event Center.

All admitted students receive full scholarships covering tuition, room, and board in university residence halls. The scholarships are funded through a gift from Joan and Yatish Joshi.

== Festival performances ==
The festival presents a concert series featuring performances by the Euclid Quartet and guest faculty string quartets throughout the 10-day program. It concludes with the Final Showcase, featuring performances by participating student quartets. Concerts and masterclasses are held in the Louise E. Addicott and Yatish J. Joshi Performance Hall at Indiana University South Bend, as well as at other public venues in the South Bend region.

== Repertoire ==
Festival programs encompass a broad range of string chamber music repertoire, including works from the Baroque, Classical, Romantic, and contemporary periods. Programming combines standard chamber music repertoire by composers such as Alessandro Scarlatti, Joseph Haydn, Ludwig van Beethoven, Robert Schumann, Felix Mendelssohn, Johannes Brahms, Pyotr Ilyich Tchaikovsky, Bedřich Smetana, Leoš Janáček, Claude Debussy, Maurice Ravel, Sergei Prokofiev, Dimitri Shostakovich, and Erich Wolfgang Korngold with works by contemporary composers, including Joan Tower, Kaija Saariaho, Raven Chacon, Robert Paterson, Reena Esmail, Augusta Read Thomas, Caroline Shaw, and Julia Wolf.

== 2025 artists ==
- Euclid Quartet
- Calidore String Quartet
- Dover Quartet
- Erinys Quartet

== 2026 artists ==
- Euclid Quartet
- Viano Quartet
- Verona Quartet

== See also ==
Chamber music

List of classical music festivals

List of Chamber music festivals

List of music festivals in the United States
