= String Quartet No. 15 (Shostakovich) =

1974 string quartet by Dmitri Shostakovich

- by Dmitri Shostakovich
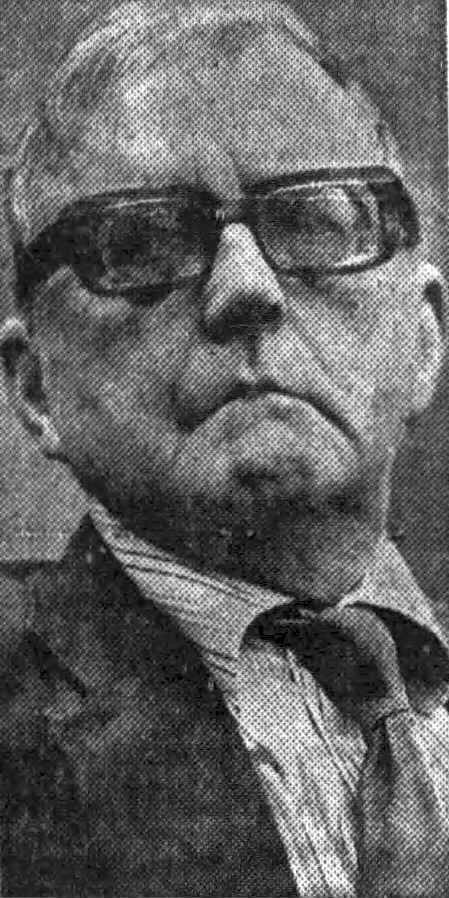
- Dmitri Shostakovich in Chicago, June 1973
- Key: E♭ minor
- Opus: 144
- Genre: string quartet
- Composed: early 1974–May 17, 1974
- Published: 1975
- Publisher: Muzika, Hans Sikorski Musikverlage
- Movements: 6

Premiere
- Date: November 15, 1974
- Location: Glinka Maly Theatre, Leningrad, Russian SFSR
- Performers: Taneyev Quartet

The String Quartet No. 15 in E♭ minor, Op. 144 by Dmitri Shostakovich is the composer's last. It was his first quartet since the Sixth (and only one of three) which did not bear a dedication.

== History ==
According to Sofia Khentova, the Fifteenth Quartet was intended as a "milestone" heralding the next nine string quartets that Shostakovich intended to compose for the Beethoven Quartet. He had previously promised them a cycle of 24 quartets in all major and minor keys. Shostakovich told the quartet's leader, Dmitri Tsyganov, that the next quartet would be dedicated to the Beethoven Quartet as a testament to his loyalty to the ensemble. Shostakovich's Fifteenth Quartet was modeled on the Third Quartet by his former pupil, Boris Tchaikovsky, which is composed entirely of slow movements.

On May 2, 1974, Shostakovich telephoned Isaak Glikman and told him he had begun work on a new string quartet. Despite difficulties with his right hand, he continued to compose while convalescing in a Moscow hospital. After being discharged, he and his wife traveled to their dacha in Repino for the summer. He completed the quartet on May 17, 1974. On June 3, Glikman visited Shostakovich, who told him he had completed the quartet: "I don't know how good it is, but I had some joy in writing it." The Fifteenth was his first quartet since the Sixth and one of only three that did not bear a dedication. It was also only one of two that were not premiered by the Beethoven Quartet.

In September, Shostakovich returned to Moscow and presented his new quartet to the members of the Beethoven Quartet. By that time his poor health had left Shostakovich unable to give a preliminary performance on the piano, as had been his practice with his previous quartets. He handed the score to Tsyganov and told him, "I cannot play it. Just see it for yourself." The quartet's cellist, Sergei Shirinsky, one of the group's two remaining founding members, had suffered a heart attack earlier that year and was also having health problems at the time. As a result, the Beethoven Quartet delayed rehearsals for the Fifteenth's premiere, which worried Shostakovich. During the rehearsals, he asked the members to play the opening movement "so that flies drop dead in mid-air and the audience start leaving the hall from sheer boredom." After rehearsals on the morning of October 18, Shirinsky died. Shostakovich asked the Taneyev Quartet, whom he had already familiarized with the score, to take over the responsibility of the world premiere, an offer which they accepted.

Prior to the Moscow premiere, Dmitri Tsyganov, the Beethoven Quartet's last surviving founding member, visited Shostakovich in the hospital for interpretive advice. The composer said to him that he had begun to think over his next quartet, then added: "You know, Mitya, I will not be able to finish the cycle of 24 quartets I had promised you."

== Music ==
The String Quartet No. 15 consists of six movements played without pause. All but one of its movements are marked "Adagio", with the outlier being the "Funeral March" marked "Adagio molto":

1. Elegy: Adagio
2. Serenade: Adagio
3. Intermezzo: Adagio
4. Nocturne: Adagio
5. Funeral march: Adagio molto
6. Epilogue: Adagio

A fugue based on a folk-like theme makes up the opening "Elegy," the longest of the six movements. It is followed by a "Serenade" in which a series of sforzandi frame a fragmented waltz melody, both of which are constructed from a twelve-note series. This gives way to the "Intermezzo," which conceals a self-quotation from The Nose, a score which had been revived in the Soviet Union for the first time in 45 years while the quartet's premiere was being prepared. A lyrical "Nocturne" follows, after which a characteristic dotted-motif played unison announces the "Funeral March." The quartet closes with an "Epilogue" which briefly recalls the preceding movements, before fading away diminuendo.

In an article published by the Information Bulletin of the Copyright Agency of the Soviet Union, Shostakovich wrote, "I tried to make [the Fifteenth Quartet] a dramatic work; it is hard to say whether I succeeded."

A typical performance lasts approximately 37 minutes. It is the longest of Shostakovich's quartets.

== Premieres ==
The world premiere took place in Leningrad on November 15, 1974, at the Glinka Maly Theatre with the composer in attendance. On January 11, 1975, the Beethoven Quartet premiered the work in Moscow, with cellist Yevgeny Altman replacing Shirinsky.

The first performance outside the Soviet Union took place in Coventry, England on March 11, 1975, at the University of Warwick's Arts Centre; the work was performed by the Fitzwilliam Quartet. The American premiere followed on January 23, 1976, at Diablo Valley College in Concord, California. (Note: A performance of the Fifteenth Quartet by the New Art Quartet of Arizona State University that took place on October 30, 1976, was incorrectly billed as the American premiere.) It was performed by a quartet of local amateur musicians in a program dedicated to Shostakovich's memory; the performers were violinists Charles Strong and Charles Blossom, violist David Green, and cellist Anna Jovanovich. The latter had received a copy of the score from Irina Shostakovich, the composer's widow, during a visit to the Soviet Union.

== Reception ==
After listening to a private performance by the Taneyev Quartet at his apartment, Shostakovich thanked them for "having penetrated so deeply the essence of this philosophical work, which I hold most dear." In an article published in Vecherniy Leningrad on November 15, 1974, Shostakovich called the Taneyev Quartet "first-class musicians who play the [Fifteenth Quartet] superbly."

Shostakovich invited his colleague Dmitry Kabalevsky to the rehearsals for the new quartet's premiere. Kabalevsky was initially moved emotionally by the quartet, but later expressed reservations. His suggestion that each movement should bear a programmatic title borrowed from Romain Rolland was not received positively by Shostakovich. According to Krzysztof Meyer, the Fifteenth Quartet was greeted with a standing ovation at its premiere, which Shostakovich acknowledged with difficulty because of his deteriorating physical abilities.

The critical reception following the Fifteenth Quartet's British and American premieres was mostly positive. Gerald Larner in The Guardian called it "a beautiful work, a credible and more than worthy companion to the recent symphonies" and that it was "yet another demonstration how fruitful, in creative terms, is Shostakovich's present preoccupation with death." In a review for the Birmingham Post, John Falding wrote that Shostakovich's ability to sustain the quartet's "haunting sadness and [its] atmosphere of total desolation" was a "mark of [his] brilliance". Charles Shere in the Oakland Tribune felt the music was an homage to Ludwig van Beethoven's late music, while a review in The Daily Telegraph called the quartet "a daring and often touching conception, even if its feelings and mannerisms have already appeared often in Shostakovich's work." Stephen Walsh in The Observer appraised the work negatively and compared it unfavorably to the Eighth Quartet. He also described the composer's late style as having "more than a trace of surrender" and prone to repeating itself:

But whereas in the [Eighth Quartet] this style was still new and obviously expressed something deeply personal for the composer, in the [Fifteenth] it takes on an altogether more negative aspect—becomes, in fact, the mere absence of resource. It's as if the composer established long ago what his elegiac style ought to be, and was now simply using it again, but without the feeling of newness.

Kurt Sanderling, a friend of the composer, speculated that he meant the work as an epitaph for himself: "Perhaps because it was so unfathomably terrifying that he could not dedicate it to anyone." In her overview of Shostakovich's quartets, Wendy Lesser wrote that what the composer "feelingly realizes in this quartet is that there can be no settling into comfortable resignation, no weak or even fearless embrace of death, because something in us always wants to live."

== Sources ==
- Fay, Laurel (2000). Shostakovich: A Life. Oxford. ISBN 0195134389.
- Glikman, Isaak (2001). Story of a Friendship: The Letters of Dmitri Shostakovich to Isaak Glikman, 1941–1975. Ithaca, New York. ISBN 0801439795.
- Khentova, Sofia (1985). Шостакович. Жизнь и творчество, Т. 2 [Shostakovich. Life and Work, vol. 2] (in Russian). Moscow: Советский композитор.
- Prieto, Carlos (2013). Dmitri Shostakóvich: Genio y drama. Ciudad de México, DF. ISBN 978-0195134384.
- Shostakovich, Dmitri (1981). Grigoryev, L.; Platek, Ya. (eds.). Dmitry Shostakovich: About Himself and his Times. Moscow: Progress Publishers.
- Wilson, Elizabeth (1994). Shostakovich: A Life Remembered. Princeton. ISBN 0691029717.
