= Baudime Jam =

French violist, composer and musicologist

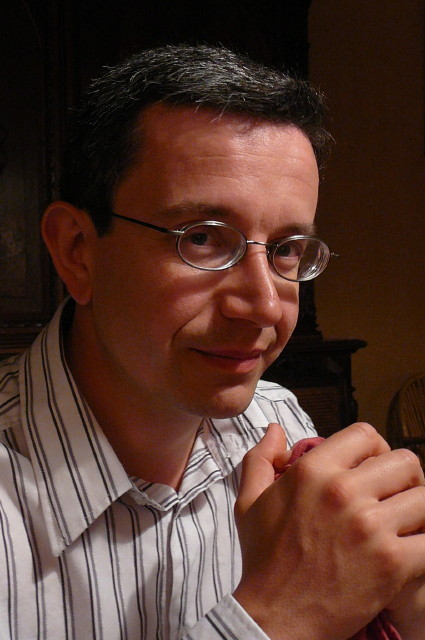
Baudime Jam

Baudime Jam (born 1972 in Clermont-Ferrand) is a French violist, composer and musicologist.

== Biography ==
He has made himself known by composing original scores for accompanying silent films, performing numerous transcriptions for string quartet, as well as his research on the composer George Onslow, to whom he has devoted two works and several articles.

He is the founder and violist of the Prima Vista Quartet in which he has performed in France and abroad since 1997.

== Composer ==
=== Soundtracks ===
==== Feature films ====
- The General (Buster Keaton)
- Nosferatu (Friedrich Murnau)
- The Black Pirate (Douglas Fairbanks)
- Orphans of the Storm (David Griffith)
- The Goddess (Wu Yonggang)
- Études sur Paris (André Sauvage)
- Deux Étoiles dans la voie lactée (Shi Dongshan)
- Wings (William Wellman)
- La Grande Guerre :
1. La Femme française pendant la guerre (Alexandre Devarennes)
2. Les Enfants de France pendant la guerre (Henri Desfontaines)
3. No Man's land (archives ECPAD)
- Dr Jekyll & Mr Hyde (John Robertson)

==== Short films ====
- The Haunted House (Buster Keaton)
- One Week (Buster Keaton)
- The Immigrant (Charlie Chaplin)
- A Film Johnnie (George Nichols)
- L'Arrivée d'un train en gare de La Ciotat (Louis Lumière)
- Le Barbier fin de siècle (Pathé)
- Premier prix de violoncelle (Pathé)
- La Course des sergents de ville (André Heuzé)
- Voyage autour d'une étoile (Gaston Velle)
- Au royaume de l'air (Walter Lantz)
- Le Dîner de Félix le Chat (Otto Messmer)
- Le Rhône, de Genève à la mer (Louis-Ernest Favre)
- Les Hallucinations d'un pompier (anonymous) : 5 variations on the song "J'ai deux amours" by Vincent Scotto.

=== Arranger ===
- La Nouvelle Babylone (G. Kosinzew & L. Trauberg): Transcription for string quartet and clarinet of Shostakovich's score.
- Le Club des menteurs (C. Bowers.): Montage and sequence of themes from the classical repertory

=== Cycles of melodies ===
- Les Horizons perdus
- Les Chants de l’Innocence

=== Tales in music ===
- La Petite musique du diable
- La Tortue rouge
- Hulul
- Mais je suis un ours !

== Publications ==
- George Onslow, Les Éditions du Mélophile, Clermont-Ferrand, September 2003, 560 pages. ISBN 2-9520076-0-8
- Henri Thévenin, le compositeur oublié de Vichy, Études bourbonnaises, n° 302, June 2005, p. 361-377
- Les Origines anglaises des Onslow, in Edouard Onslow : Un peintre en Auvergne, Un Deux Quatre éditions, 2005, ISBN 978-2913323858
- Silent music : mythes et réalités
- George Onslow & l'Auvergne, Les Éditions du Mélophile, July 2011. 400 pages + 72 page color iconographic booklet. ISBN 978-2-95200-762-7
