= La Catrina Quartet =

The La Catrina Quartet is a group of four U.S.-based classical musicians who specialize in traditional and classical music from the Americas as well as traditional European pieces. The group was formed in 2001 by four graduate students at the Western Michigan University. The group tours regularly through the United States and Mexico, with about 50 performances per year at venues such as New Museum of Musical Instruments in Phoenix, the Symphony Space in New York and the Festival Internacional Cervantino. The quartet has collaborated with orchestras, composers and others to create new compositions, and record pieces by Latin American artists. In 2012, the group won a Latin Grammy for Best Classical Recording with Brasilero. It has also won the Research and Creative Scholarship Prize from the Western Michigan University and the Creative Scholarship and Arts Council Award of North Carolina.

== Repertoire and work ==
Named after the famous skeletal figure created by Mexican cartoonist José Guadalupe Posada, La Catrina's work is characterized by the blend of Latin American traditional and classical pieces along with traditional European ones, averaging about fifty concerts per year, mostly in the United States and Mexico in venues such as the University of Washington in Seattle, at the New Museum of Musical Instruments in Phoenix, the Symphony Space in New York, Utah State University, the Mexican Embassy in Washington DC Festival de Música de Cámera in Morelia and the Festival Internacional Cervantino. Their repertoire includes new works by living composers in the United States and the rest of the Americas, those by Latin American composers rarely heard in the United States and new interpretations of classical pieces written up to the 20th century. They have been called Latin American musical ambassadors by Yo-Yo Ma. According to member Jorge Martínez del Río, one reason to maintain more traditional pieces is due to the more conservative nature of U.S. audiences, where the quartet is based.

== Members ==
The current members of the quartet include Daniel Vega Albela, and Jorge Martínez Ríos are from Mexico with Blake Espy from the United States and Jorge Espinoza from Chile. All of the members are musicians in their own right, having played solo and with other organizations in the United States, Mexico, Japan and the United Kingdom.

Daniel Vega Albela, a founding member of the quartet, was born in Mexico City, where he began studying violin with Yuriko Kuronuma. His first recognition was a silver medal at the first National Violin Contest at the National Autonomous University of Mexico. At age sixteen, he went to New York City to study the instrument at Mannes College of Music under Sally Thomas. Later he earned his master's degree in violin at the Western Michigan University, studying under Renata Artman Knific, and a second masters at Kent State. Vega has performed with St Cecilia Chamber Orchestra, the Amherst Collegium Musicum, the Opus 1 Chord Ensemble and the Western New York Chamber Players and as a soloist, has traveled to Japan and Mexico. From 1994 to 1997 he taught at the Yuriko Kuromuna Academy in Mexico City, and in 1997 he appeared at the Festival Internacional Cervantino with the Ensamble de las Rosas, (of the Conservatorio de las Rosas). From 2001 to 2003 he performed with the Interlochen Center for the Arts in Michigan. Several of his students have won recognitions locally in the Midwest US and appears in the 2004-2005 Who's Who Among America's Teachers.

Jorge A. Martinez is a founding member from Torreón, Coahuila, Mexico where he studied viola at the Conservatorio de las Rosas with Gela Dubrova. He was invited to play in Texas in 1998 and received a scholarship to attend graduate school at the Western Michigan University from the Mexican government in 2001 and later received a second masters at Kent State. Martinez has performed with the Philharmonic of Mexico, the Western Piedmont Symphony, the Las Cruces Symphony, along with the Tokyo String Quartet and the Miami String Quartet in venues such as Carnegie Hall, Merkin Hall and Symphony Space in New York, as well as the Chicago Center for the Arts and the Palacio de Bellas Artes in Mexico City. He has taught at the Conservatorio de las Rosas Festival, the Crescendo Academy in Kalamazoo, Michigan as well as in London.

Jorge Espinoza is a cellist is from Chile. He received the Gregor Piatigorsky scholarship to study and teach at the Peabody Institute of Johns Hopkins University. There he studied cello to the post graduate level, becoming a teaching assistant to Stephen Kates. He studied chamber music here has well under David Hardy and Andrés Díaz. He also holds a master's degree in musical interpretation from Carnegie Mellon, studying under David Premo and Anne Martindale Williams, along with Jorge Román, Lazslo Varga, Dennis Parker and Marcio Carneiro. He has taught cello and chamber music at the Tercer Seminario Internacional in Venezuela and has performed at the Kennedy Center, Carnegie Hall, Lincoln Center and Symphony Hall along with venues in Chile, other parts of South America and Mexico.

Blake Espy is a U.S. violinist with a bachelor's degree in music performance from Western Michigan University, a master's degree in music from Louisiana State University and an artist's diploma from SUNY Purchase. He regularly performs with the Philadelphia Orchestra, the New Jersey Symphony Orchestra, the Pennsylvania Ballet, the Opera Philadelphia, the Grand Rapids Symphony and the Princeton Symphony, as well as concertmaster with the Las Cruces Symphony Orchestra and the Western Piedmont Symphony. In 2007, Espy became a member of the New World Symphony in Miami Beach where he performs as concertmaster and chamber musician as well as teaches young musicians. That same year, he co-founded Project 440, a non-profit dedicated to training young classical musicians through community programs.

Former members include violinist George A Figueroa, cellist player Alan Daowz and violinist Roberta Arruda.

== History ==
The quartet was founded at the Western Michigan University in 2001, by four graduate students at the institution. The group were friends who initially played casually, but over time decided to become professional. Shortly after the group received a commission from Symphony Space to sponsor the second string quartet of Roberto Sierra, which premiered in 2001 by the four musicians.

In 2003, composer Zae Munn composed Our Hands Were Tightly Clenched for the quartet, who premiered it for the School of Fine Arts in Chicago the same year. In 2005, they were invited to compete in the Joseph Joachim International Chamber Music Competition in Weimar, Germany, the only group from the Americas to participate, making the finals. The quartet became resident at the New Mexico State University in 2006 and have remained resident there and at the LA Western Piedmont, Symphony of North Carolina since.

Since 2009, the group has performed about 500 times, mostly in the United States and Mexico, but also in Germany and England. In 2010, Cuarteto No. 2 was written by Puerto Rican composer Roberto Sierra specifically for the group, sponsored by Symphony Space in New York City. The piece was premiered in 2011 at the Wall to Wall Sonidos Festival. This same year, they collaborated with Cuarteto Latinoamericano to record Seresta No.2 for Double String Quartet by Brazilian composer Francisco Mignone.

In 2012, the group won a Latin Grammy for Best Classical Recording with Brasilero, and in 2013, they were invited by CONACULTA to record chamber music written by José Pablo Moncayo.

In 2014 the quartet premiered a piece by Mexican composer Carlos Sanchez-Gutierrez, sponsored by the Festival International Cervantino, and released their first commercial CD América Latina: A Musical Canvas which was nominated for a Latin Grammy award.

Other recognitions for the group's work include the Research and Creative Scholarship Prize from the Western Michigan University and the Creative Scholarship and Arts Council Award of North Carolina (2009-2010).
