= Fischoff National Chamber Music Association =

The Fischoff National Chamber Music Association is a United States 501(c)3 nonprofit organization headquartered in South Bend, Indiana. It is led by a team of staff, supported by members of a National Advisory Council, and governed by a board of directors.

== Competition ==
Joseph E. Fischoff and the South Bend Chamber Music Society founded the Fischoff National Chamber Music Competition in 1973 as a way of encouraging young people to pursue chamber music study and performance. The Fischoff Competition has grown from 6 ensembles in 1973 to 59 ensembles in both wind and string categories as of 2024. In the competition, an average of 22 different nationalities are represented each year by foreign nationals from South America, Asia, and Europe. The winners of the Senior Division Gold Medals also participate in the Double Gold Tour.

== Educational outreach programs ==
Fischoff's outreach and residency programs have won many awards and are highly regarded. Committed to music education, Fischoff partners with its Competition alumni to deliver free, innovative music programs to children and youth in the Northeast Indiana and Southern Michigan region. Programs are presented in schools, community centers, and after school programs. Through these programs, Fischoff has served over 101,177 youth in the tri-state region since 1995. On an annual basis, Fischoff reaches more than 4,000 students, many of whom are at under-resourced and Title 1 schools within the Michiana community. Fischoff's programs give local students first-hand, close-up, personal experiences with some of the finest chamber musicians in the world.

Their programs also include an annual Chamber Music Summer Intensive, Chamber Music Academy, and Arts-in-Education residency.
