= Marmen Quartet =

British string quartet

The Marmen Quartet is a string quartet based in the UK, with violinists Johannes Marmen and Laia Valentin Braun, violist Bryony Gibson-Cornish and cellist Sinéad O'Halloran.

The quartet was founded in 2013 by Johannes Marmen and Ricky Gore, violinists at the Royal College of Music in London. In 2019 they won the Grand Prize at the Bordeaux International String Quartet Competition, organized by the cellist Alain Meunier. In the same year they won joint First Prize at the Banff International String Quartet Competition, where they were also awarded the Haydn and Canadian Commission prizes.

They have given performances across the United Kingdom and Europe. Having taken medical precautions concerning COVID-19, the quartet have given live performances during September 2020 in Heidelberg, Wolfenbüttel, Leipzig in Germany and at the Schloss Esterházy, Eisenstadt, in Austria. Concerts resumed from July 2021; performances in August included their debut in the BBC Promenade Concerts at Cadogan Hall and in the Festival International de Quatuors à Cordes du Luberon at the church of St Sebastian in Goult, Provence.
