= Methera =

English string quartet

Methera is an English string quartet which plays traditional music and compositions by the members of the group. They have collaborated with other folk musicians including Karen Tweed, Nancy Kerr and James Fagan.

In 2006, they recorded for the BBC Radio 3 feature England in Ribbons, and they played on the soundtrack of the 2009 film Morris: A Life with Bells On. The quartet's eponymous debut album was released in 2008, and they released a live album entitled Methera in Concert in 2010. Vortex followed in 2016.

== Group members ==
- Emma Reid plays fiddle. She has worked with a range of musicians including Sofia Karlsson, May Monday (Karen Tweed and Timo Alakotila), Ditt Ditt Darium, and the Under One Sky project with John McCusker.
- Sam Sweeney joined in 2019 playing fiddle.
- Miranda Rutter plays viola. She has previously played with Jabadaw and Fika.
- Lucy Deakin plays cello. She has also appeared on recordings by alternative post-rock band iLiKETRAiNS.

=== Former members ===
- John Dipper played fiddle until 2019. He plays with other bands, most notably English Acoustic Collective with Chris Wood and Robert Harbron.

== Recordings ==
- 2008 – Methera YAN001
- 2010 – Methera in Concert, featuring the trio Kerr Fagan Harbron TAN002
- 2016 – Vortex MET003
