= Vaghy String Quartet =

The Vághy String Quartet is a Canadian string quartet known for its luscious and emotional sound, as talked about by the New York Times, as well as for its numerous performances throughout North America and Europe. Formed in 1965, the quartet has played and premiered many composers. It has also recorded many classical pieces, having a total repertoire of over 160 pieces. The quartet taught throughout Canada and won the 1977 Canadian Music Council award for best recording of the year.

== Members ==
Name	Instrument	Membership Dates	Nationality
Dezsö Vághy	Violin 1	1965-End	Hungarian
Tibor Vághy	Viola	1965-End	Hungarian
Stephen Kecskeméthy	Violin 2	1965-1969	Hungarian
Edward Culbreath	Cello	1965-1969	American
David George	Violin 2	1969-1981	American
Robert Dodson	Cello	1969-1981	American
Alana Deptuch Vághy	Violin 2	1981-End	Canadian
Julian Tryczynski	Cello	1981-End	Polish

Formed in 1965 by Dezsö Vághy (Violin), Tibor Vághy (Viola), Stephen Kecskeméthy (Second violin), and Edward Culbreath (Cello) at the Juilliard School, the Vághy String Quartet was unchanged until 1969. That year David George and Robert Dodson, both Americans, took over as second violin and cello, respectively. In 1981, David George was replaced by Alanna Deptuch Vághy, a pupil of, and later married to, Dezsö Vághy, and Robert Dodson was replaced by Julian Tryczynski.

Brothers Dezsö Vághy and Tibor Vághy received their early musical training in Hungary with Ilona Halasz in Budapest, Austria, and Germany. Both graduated from the Hamburg State Academy of Music with master's degrees and subsequently studied at the Juilliard School of Music with Dorothy DeLay. David George studied violin in the mid-west at the Friends University in Wichita, the University of Kansas, and the University of Oklahoma. Robert Dodson started out his musical training in New York City, attended Columbia University and the New England Conservatory of Music, and is a graduate of Indiana University. He now resides as the Director of the Division of Music at Southern Methodist University. Alanna Deptuch Vághy studied with Elman Lowe, and later with Howard-Leyton-Brown at the Regina Conservatory of Music, then continued her studies at Queens University and the Meadowmount School of Music. Stephen Kecskeméthy graduated from the Eastman school of Music.

== History ==
The album that won the CBC best recording of the year award; recorded in 1976.

The Vághy String Quartet (sometimes shortened to VSQ) was formed in 1965 at the Juilliard School of Music. It was formed by Dezsö and Tibor Vághy, two Hungarian brothers, who were joined by Stephen Kecskeméthy and Edward Culbreath. Originally a violinist, Tibor became the viola of the quartet. Stephen Kecskeméthy was the second violin and Edward Culbreath was the cello. The group was coached by the Juilliard, Amadeus, and Hungarian quartets. It was appointed quartet-in-residence at the Westchester Music and Art Camp in the summer of 1966, then appointed the quartet-in-residence at the University of Maine later in 1966, a position that it held until 1968. Its first appearance in Canada was at Expo 67 of 1967. It came to Queen's University in 1968, sponsored by the Ontario council for the arts, the university, and the Kingston symphony, and stayed there until 1991, holding the position of quartet-in-residence. The quartet performed all around the campus and throughout Kingston, playing both normal concerts and so-called "anticoncerts," which were informal concerts with explanations and discussions of the music mixed in.

The quartet performed throughout Canada and the rest of North America, performing at Carnegie Hall and Avery Fisher Hall as well as many others halls, and on radio (such as CBC Radio) and television. The quartet also performed live and on recording throughout Europe, as well as at the 1976 Summer Olympics, premiering several works. Their repertoire included Bartók, Shostakovich, Szymanowski, Ravel, and Janáček, among other 20th-century composers. The quartet premiered several works as well: John Fodi's Quartet for Strings 'Ch'ien' and Paul Crawford's String Quartet: 'La nuit étoilée' in 1974; James Montgomery's Reconnaissance in 1975; Graham George's Fuguing Music for String Quartet, James Kent's Cadenza String Quartet, and Norman Sherman's Quadron in 1976; William Wallace's Quartet for Strings in 1983; and Healey Willan's Introduction and Allegro (completed by F.R.C. Clarke) in 1984. The Vághy Quartet performed the works of Canadian composers as well, such as Barnes, Glick, Hétu, Joachim, Koprowski and Somers. The quartet has attended musical festivals in many places, including Aspen, Colorado, Maine, Lancut, and Poland.

Vaghy String Quartet – Ravel String Quartet 1st Mov.
This passage excellently demonstrates the "European Flair" that the Quartet plays with.

The quartet taught at the Kelso Music Centre during the summers of 1975–1977, as well as at the Chamber Music Institute in 1978-1980 (which the quartet founded). It was praised very highly throughout its career for its sound. As one essay says, "Its sound has never been understated; it is vigorous and powerful, the players often seeming to push their instruments to the limit." This can be heard best on the quartet's recording of Bartók's String Quartet No. 4 (recorded on CBC SM 325 in 1976) with its full chords, heavily accented dissonances and pounding ostinati. After the quartet's New York debut on March 2, 1975, Peter G. Davis in the New York Times (9 Mar 1975) praised a 'large, lush, glamorous ensemble tone... used... to excellent effect.' Other critics have found them to be "Superb" in Chicago, "marvelously sensitive" in Washington, an "outstanding ensemble" in Montreal, "hard to excel" in Phoenix, and "fine virtuoso musicians" in Little Rock. There was also a film made about the quartet, entitled Vaghy, which was created in 1971 by Quarry Film Production. The quartet won the 1977 Canadian Music Council award for the best chamber music record for its recording of Shostakovich's and Szymanowski's quartets, and was nominated for the prestigious Grand Prix award.
