= Taneyev Quartet =

USSR string quartet

The Taneyev Quartet was a string quartet based in Leningrad. It made its first appearance in the Small Hall of the Leningrad Conservatory in the winter of 1946. Its members were students. The quartet played in particular the quartets of Beethoven, Tchaikovsky, and Taneiev but also included first performances of works by the Leningrad composers Vadim Salmanov, Orest Yevlakhov, Veniamin Basner, A. Chernov, Vladislav Agafonnikov and others. In 1974 Dmitri Shostakovich, who was a friend of the first violinist Vladimir Ovcharek, had the quartet perform the world premiere of his 15th string quartet in Leningrad.

The quartet made its American debut in New York City in 1987.

The name of Taneyev was adopted by the Quartet in 1963. Its members are: Vladimir Ovcharek, Grigori Lutski, Vissarion Soloview and Josif Levinson.

== Sources ==
Liner note with S. Taneyev, String Quartets No. 8 in C Major; String Quartet No. 9 in A major, Melodiya MA 12411
