= Esmé Quartet =

South Korean string quartet

The Esmé Quartet is a string quartet, formed in 2016 at the Hochschule für Musik und Tanz in Cologne, Germany by four Korean musicians. The ensemble takes its name from an Old French word meaning 'loved' or 'esteemed'.

== Background ==
The founding members knew each other as friends before and shared common interests and passions in music, the arts, and life. The quartet has rapidly gained a reputation as a chamber ensemble.

Esmé studied with Heime Müller (Artemis Quartet) at the Musikhochschule Lübeck, Germany and is currently studying with Oliver Wille (Kuss Quartet) at the Hochschule für Musik, Theater und Medien Hannover, Germany.

== Prizes ==
In spring 2018, the quartet won first prize and four special prizes (Alan Bradley Mozart-Prize, Bram Eldering Beethoven-Prize, the ProQuartet Prize and Prize of the Esterházy Foundation) at the prestigious Wigmore Hall International String Quartet Competition in London, and in autumn 2018, it became HSBC Laureate of the Académie du Festival d’Aix. This recognition followed prizes at the Trondheim International Chamber Music Competition, Irene-Steels Wilsing String Quartet Competition and the 55th Possehl Musik Preis Lübeck Germany.

== Concerts ==
The Esmé Quartet has appeared at St Martin-in-the-Fields, the Flagey Musiq3 Festival in Brussels, and as a resident quartet at the 2018 Aix-en-Provence festival, the 2018 McGill International String Quartet Academy in Montreal and Classic Esterházy in Eisenstadt. The quartet has participated in the ProQuartet Academy in Roussillon (France) in 2017 and in the 2017 Jeunesses Musicales International Chamber Music Campus in Weikersheim, where it was awarded a special prize in the form of a residency at the 2019 Heidelberger Streichquartettfest.

== Members ==
The members are:

- Wonhee Bae, first violin
- Yuna Ha, second violin
- Dimitri Murrath, viola (2023. 3.~present)
- Ye-eun Heo, violoncello.

Former member

- Jiwon Kim, viola (2016~2023. 3.)
