= Aviv String Quartet =

The Aviv String Quartet is a musical quartet that was founded in Israel in 1997. Among the quartet's various awards are the DaimlerChrysler Grand Prize at the 3rd Melbourne International Chamber Music Competition and top prizes at the Bordeaux and Schubert Competitions. The Aviv Quartet has recorded 3 discs of Shostakovich on Dalia Classics and 2 Naxos discs of Hoffmeister and Schulhoff. It completed the Shostakovich cycle at the 2007 Verbier Festival, debuts at the Zurich Tonhalle and Brussels Palais des Beaux–Arts and returns visits to Wigmore Hall. The quartet is renowned for its nuanced interpretations.

Brandon Garbot, from Portland, OR who studied in the Curtis Institute of Music together with Ida Kavafian and Arnold Steinhardt was recently appointed as second violinist.

== Members ==
=== Current members ===
- Violin I: Anna Göckel
- Violin II: Brandon Garbot
- Viola: Noémie Bialobroda
- Cello: Daniel Mitnitsky

=== Former members ===
- Violin I: Sergey Ostrovsky (1997–2023)
- Violin II: Evgenia Epshtein (1997–2015)
- Violin II: Philippe Villafranca (2015-2024)
- Viola: Timur Yakubov (2011–2015)
- Viola: Shuli Waterman (1997–2009)
- Viola: Nathan Braude (2009–2011)
- Cello: Iris Jortner (1997–2002)
- Cello: Rachel Mercer (2002–2010)
