= Banff International String Quartet Competition =

Orchestral competition in Banff, Canada

The Banff International String Quartet Competition is held once in three years at the Banff Centre for Arts and Creativity in Banff, Alberta, Canada.

== History ==
The competition was organized in 1983 by Kenneth Murphy to celebrate the 50th anniversary of the Banff Centre for the Arts, at which he was the assistant artistic director for musical programs. It is now recognised as one of the world's major string quartet competitions.

== Competition details ==
Ten quartets from around the world are selected to take part in the semi-final competition. All members of the quartets must be under the age of 35. After playing various styles of both traditional and modern chamber music before audiences over a period of several days, three finalist groups are chosen. After further performances these are judged and a winner chosen.

Each year the winning ensemble receives a cash prize and a three-year career development programme, including a recording session at Banff Centre and a performance tour of European and North American cities. There is also a cash prize for second place and smaller specific prizes.

== Winners ==
Winners
Year	Ensemble	Country	Source
2025	Poiesis Quartet	American	
2022	Isidore String Quartet	American	
2019	tie: Marmen Quartet & Viano Quartet	UK & Canada/USA	
2016	Rolston String Quartet	Canadian	
2013	Dover Quartet	American	
2010	Cecilia String Quartet	Canadian	
2007	Tinalley String Quartet	Australian	
2004	Jupiter Quartet	American	
2001	Daedalus Quartet	American	
1998	Miró Quartet	American	
1995	Amernet String Quartet	American	
1992	St. Lawrence String Quartet	Canadian	
1989	Quatour Manfred	French	
1986	Franciscan Quartet	American	
1983	Colorado Quartet	American	
