= Circadian String Quartet =

Bay Area-based Circadian String Quartet was founded in 2013. The ensemble performs a wide range of classical and contemporary repertoire with folkloric or cultural significance, as well as original pieces composed or arranged by members of the group, including a transcription of Igor Stravinsky's Rite of Spring for string quartet and percussion.

Circadian String Quartet has worked closely with several living composers on new pieces of chamber music, including Sahba Aminikia, Ben Carson, Toronto-based Noam Lemish, and British composer Ian Venables, and has given several world and U.S. premieres of their work, including Venables' Canzonetta in 2014 and a new piece by Aminikia in October 2017.

Members of Circadian String Quartet perform throughout the Bay Area and also serve as resident teaching artists for the Zephyr Point Chamber Music Workshop. Members of the quartet are active music teachers and work with musicians of all ages in developing their musical abilities in chamber music.

== Members ==
The members of the Circadian String Quartet are:

- Monika Gruber – Violin
- David Ryther – Violin
- Omid Assadi – Viola
- David Wishnia – Cello
