= Laclede Quartet =

String quartet from St. Louis, Missouri

Formed in 1978, the Laclede String Quartet (better known as the Laclede Quartet) is an all-female string quartet that plays popular as well as classical music. The Laclede Quartet was founded by violinist Sallie Coffman (now also concertmaster for the St. Louis Muny orchestra), and is from the Metropolitan St. Louis, Missouri, and Illinois area. Especially their popular music performances and CDs have resonated with audiences: their second album featured music by Andrew Lloyd Webber and was their biggest success to that date, 1992. Through the help of Hillary Clinton their fame has spread to the Middle East. In a 2000 interview, Sallie Coffman recollected, "We met her [Clinton] when she was in St. Louis and she took our recordings back to the White House . . . Somehow they made it to an embassy in Abudabi. We got such a kick out of getting fan mail from Abudabi through the diplomatic pouch."

The quartet has recorded five CDs, which are sold locally in St. Louis and through their website.
