= Somogyi String Quartet =

The Somogyi String Quartet (known in Hungarian as Somogyi-vonósnégyes) was formed in summer of 1997 from ex-students of the Franz Liszt Academy Budapest. Its debut was at the Bartók Memorial House with a program by Beethoven and Bartók. The quartet was invited to the following festivals: Ravinia festival Chicago Quartet festival Radom Poland Festival de Mayo Guadalajara Mexico Viva Vivaldi Mexico DF Hugo Wolf- Days St. Paul Austria Mini Fesztivál Budapest. Concert-series in Hungary and in Europe. Hungaroton has released several CD-s featuring the quartet. These recordings and other recordings of the quartet are regularly broadcast by the Hungarian Radio.

The Somogyi String Quartet is particularly known for their performances of music composed by contemporary Hungarian composers like Attila Bozay, Barnabás Dukay, and Sándor Szokolay. In 2021 the group was honored with the Artisjus Award, a highly regarded cultural prize in Hungary.

== Members ==
- Péter Somogyi -1. violin
- György Lendvai- 2. violin
- Balázs Tóth -viola
- Lászlo Pólus - cello

== Discography ==
- https://hungarotonmusic.com/somogyi-vonosnegyes-a4244.html
- http://www.bmcrecords.hu/pages/tartalom/index.php?kod=116
