= Hugo Wolf Quartet =

Austrian string quartet

The Hugo Wolf Quartet is an Austrian string quartet ensemble.

== History ==
The quartet was founded in 1993 and took its name from the "Internationalen Hugo Wolf Gesellschaft Wien". Meanwhile, it plays in all important concert halls and festivals. Zbigniew Bargielski, Friedrich Cerha, Dirk D'Ase, Johannes Maria Staud and Erich Urbanner for example, composed works especially for this ensemble. Among the numerous recordings, one in particular received a favourable review, that of the complete String Quartets by Ludwig van Beethoven.

== Awards ==
- First prize at the 5th International String Quartet Competition in Cremona
- Best string quartet at the 45th International G. B. Viotti Competition for Chamber Music
- Fifth prize at the London International String Quartet Competition.
- European Chamber Music Prize

== Members ==
- Sebastian Gürtler, violin I
- Régis Bringolf, violin II
- Subin Lee, alto
- Florian Berner, cello

== Former members ==
- Jehi Bahk (violin I and II, 1992–1993, formerly called "Akademie Quartet")
- Jun Keller (violin I and II, 1992–1993, formerly called "Akademie Quartet")
- Jehi Bahk (violin I, 1993–2004)
- Petra Ackermann (alto, 1992–1993)
- Martin Edelmann (alto, 1993–1998)
- Wladimir Kossjanenko (alto, 1998–2007)
- Gertrud Weinmeister (alto, 2007–2013)
- Thomas Selditz (alto, 2013–2016)
