= Fischoff National Chamber Music Competition =

The Fischoff National Chamber Music Competition is the largest and oldest continuous chamber music competition in the United States. In 1973, Joseph E. Fischoff and fellow members of the South Bend Chamber Music Society established a competition to encourage young people to pursue chamber music study and performance.

The first competition drew six ensembles. Today it averages around 125 ensembles, representing 22 nationalities. There are two categories, string and wind.

Fischoff is the only national chamber music competition with senior (ages 18–35) and junior (age 18 and younger) divisions. More than 7,600 musicians have participated, many of whom have gone on to distinguished careers in music performance and education. The Fischoff attracts young musicians from around the globe, and winning a prize at the Fischoff is a coveted honor.

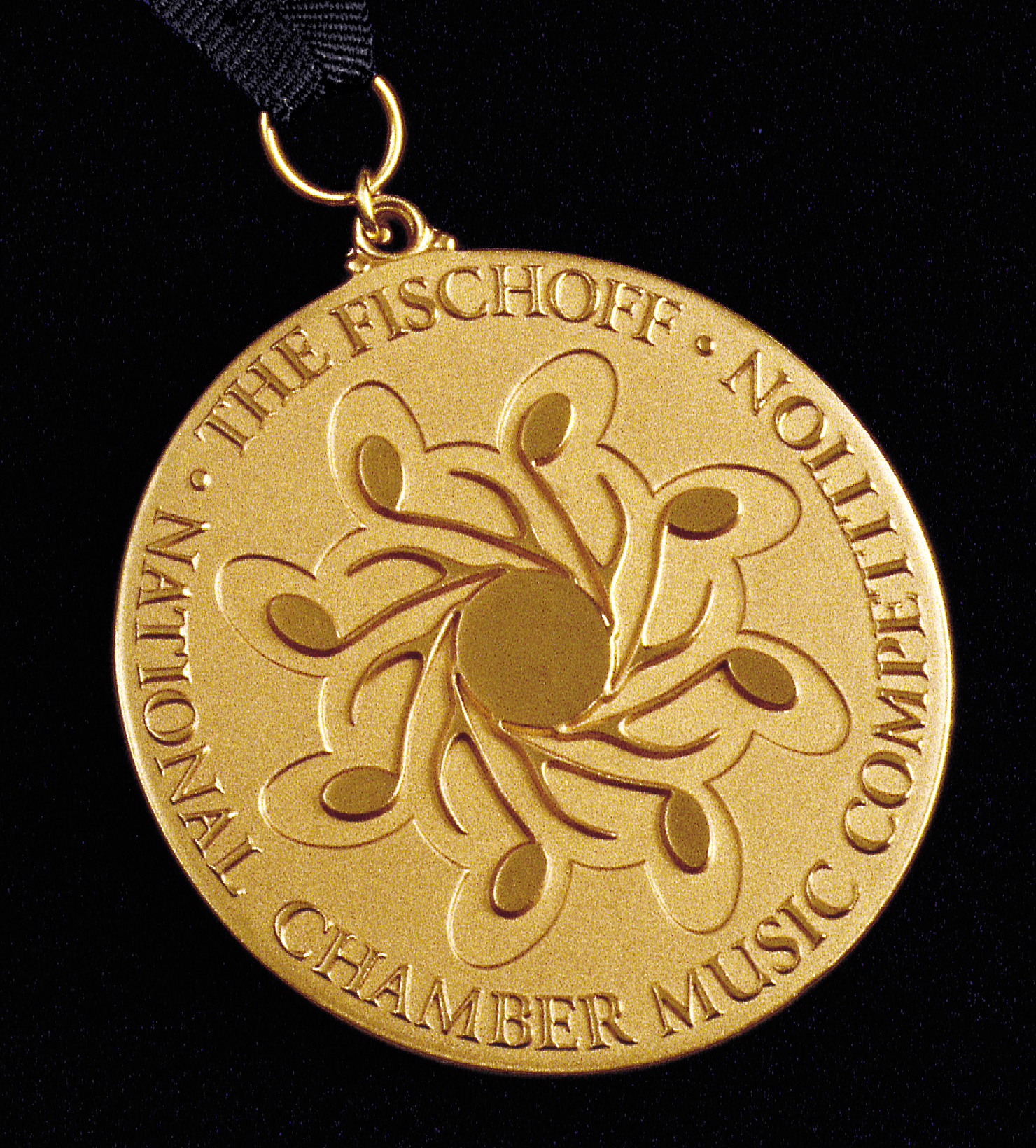
Fischoff Gold Medal

== The competition ==
The annual competition takes place at the University of Notre Dame's DeBartolo Performing Arts Center. The 49th Annual Fischoff Competition will take place May 20–22, 2022. The Fischoff competition emphasizes music education, with jurors delivering written comments and personal critiques to competitors. Master classes are also offered to junior division (age 18 and younger) quarter-finalist ensembles. A total of $44,300 in prize money is awarded and the winners of the Senior Division Gold Medals also participate in the Double Gold Tour.

== Beyond the competition ==
The Fischoff National Chamber Music Association works with competition alumni to bring free music programs to children through the Fischoff Arts-in-Education Residency. Playing in schools, libraries and community centres, high-quality artists perform for and interact with children who otherwise often have limited experience and/or access to live classical music performance. Fischoff also offers programs to support and encourage area high school-aged musicians. According to the Fischoff website, these programs have served more than 91,500 community children since 1995 and reach more than 6,000 underserved and at-risk young people every year.
