= Nevine String Quartet =

String quartet from Wellington, New Zealand

String Quartet in Wellington formed in 1995 from the ranks of the New Zealand Symphony Orchestra. The players were: Liz Patchett & Janet Armstrong – violins, Peter Barber – viola, & Robert Ibell – cello. The group performed a varied repertoire and included in their programmes works by New Zealand composers Anthony Ritchie, John Psathas and Nigel Keay.

Nevine Quartet's last major project was "The Kreutzer" based on work by L. Tolstoy, L. Janáček and L van Beethoven, directed by Sara Brodie, and starring Tom McCrory.
