= Su Lian Tan =

Malaysian-born American composer

Su Lian Tan (born 1964) is a Malaysian-born American composer and flautist. Her works have been commissioned by the Takács Quartet, Meridian Arts Ensemble and the Boston Modern Orchestra Project. She is currently a visiting professor of music at the State University of New York University at Buffalo as the Slee artist in residence.

Born in Malaysia, Tan began a professional career in music at the age of 14. She went on to study at Juilliard School, Bennington College and Princeton University with teachers including Milton Babbitt, Bernard Rands and Henry Brant. She toured the world as a guest soloist, displaying her virtuosity on the flute, and making forays into opera (she is a lyric soprano) and pop music. She was hired by Middlebury College in 1994, and since then, she has focused on teaching and composition.

== Compositions ==
Recent premieres include a symphony, premiered by the Vermont Youth Orchestra, River of the Trunk, a song-cycle, set with the poems of fellow Middlebury professor John Elder, and Orfeo in Asia for piano, performed at the 2008 International Albert-Roussel Festival (France). A series of songs composed in conjunction with author Jamaica Kincaid, entitled "Jamaica Songs" have been recorded for Arsis by the mezzo-soprano Brenda Patterson.
