= Arpeggione Quartet =

French string quartet

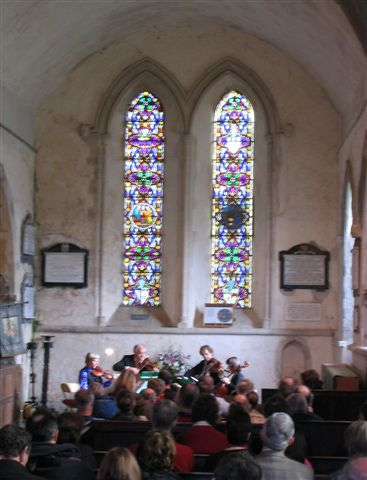
The Arpeggione in Kent 2005

The Arpeggione Quartet is a French string quartet, led by Isabelle Flory (violin), with Nicholas Risler (violin), Patrick Dussart (viola), and Marie-Thérèse Grisenti (cello).

The quartet has played all over the world including performances at London's Wigmore Hall, the Musée d'Orsay, Opéra Bastille and Carrousel du Louvre in Paris, and recently at the Musique-Cordiale festivals in the Var, France and Britain. It has starred at major international festivals including the Salzburg, the Lockenhaus, the Schloss-Elmau (Germany), the Wiener Klassisch and the Ottawa "Strings of the Future" Festival, as well as at the Simon Wiesenthal Center in Los Angeles. In 2005, Margaret Fingerhut played César Franck's passionate Piano Quintet with the quatuor at the Conway Hall in London. In March 1996, the Arpeggione were invited to perform at the Elysée Palace by Yehudi Menuhin to celebrate his eightieth birthday.

The repertoire of the Arpeggione is considerable in wealth, breadth and ambition, ranging from Haydn, Mozart, Beethoven – along with Schubert, Schumann and Brahms – to Stravinsky, Bartók, Schönberg, Berg and Weber, with special mention to the "big three" French composers – Debussy, Fauré, Ravel. It recently revived Florent Schmitt's outstanding string quartet, which had not been played, at least in France, for forty years.
