= Atrium String Quartet =

Atrium String Quartet (also known as Atrium Quartet) is a string quartet founded in 2000 in Saint Petersburg, and based in Berlin since 2006. It is considered one of the leading chamber ensembles of its generation. The quartet has won several prestigious international competitions, including First Prize at the 9th London International String Quartet Competition in 2003 (renamed the Wigmore Hall International String Quartet Competition in 2022), and First Prize at the 7th Bordeaux International String Quartet Competition in 2007.

Over the past 25 years, the Atrium Quartet has performed on five continents, giving more than 1,000 concerts in some of the world’s most renowned concert halls. Its repertoire includes complete string quartet cycles by Beethoven, Brahms, Mendelssohn, Shostakovich, Tchaikovsky, and others. The ensemble is also known for its commitment to contemporary music: string quartets by Jordi Cervelló, Andrei Petrov and Kuzma Bodrov were dedicated to the group.

The quartet’s discography includes works by Shostakovich, Beethoven, Tchaikovsky, Mozart, and others, released on internationally recognized labels such as EMI Classics, Zig-Zag Territoires, and Hänssler Classic. A distinctive achievement in the quartet’s history is its unique project of performing the complete Shostakovich string quartets in a single day, which has been presented in Germany, France, Japan, Russia, and Iceland.

== Members ==
- Violin I: Nikita Boriso-Glebsky (from 2017)

Sergey Malov (2015-2017); Alexey Naumenko (2000-2015)

- Violin II: Anton Ilyunin, (since 2000)
- Viola: Dmitry Pitulko (since 2004); Dmitry Usov (2000-2004)
- Violoncello: Anna Gorelova (since 2000)

=== External links ===
- Official web-page
- Official Facebook page
- Twitter
