= Regent String Quartet =

British string quartet

The Regent String Quartet
- Origin: England
- Genres: Classical; Chamber; Pop; Bollywood
- Years active: 1996 to present
- Label: Unsigned
- Members: See: Current Line-up

The Regent String Quartet are a British string quartet,

The Regent String Quartet was formed in the mid-1990s. Their original lineup was Helen Godbolt, Sarah Turner, Caryn Cohen and Emma Martin (see the Members section for more details).

They were formed at the Royal Academy of Music where they were all trained as classical players.

== Members ==
=== Current lineup ===
- Caryn Cohen (First Violin)
- Emma Martin (Second Violin)
- Sarah Turner (Viola)
- Helen Godbolt (Cello)

== Appearances ==
=== Artists whom they have supported ===
KanYe West, McFly, Vanessa Mae, Gabrielle, Mostly Autumn, Nigel Kennedy, Julian Lloyd Webber, Luciano Pavarotti, Russell Watson, The Opera Babes.

=== TV ===
Too Good To Be True (ITV, 2003), Comic Relief 2005, supporting McFly, Brit Awards (several years) - accompanying strings, Top Of The Pops (several appearances) - accompanying strings.

=== Film ===
The Lord of the Rings soundtrack

=== DVD ===
- The V Shows (DVD 2004, CD 2005)
