= Prima Vista Quartet =

The Prima Vista Quartet is a French string quartet that was founded in 1997 in Clermont-Ferrand. It is now based in Paris. Since its foundation, it gave performances in France, Spain, Italy, Germany, England, Poland, Russia, the United States, China and Africa.

Its repertoire ranges from the classics to the contemporary, with a predilection for unknown composers, especially George Onslow.

The Prima Vista Quartet also enjoys performing jazz, tango, klezmer, musical tales for children, and original scores for silent movies (cine-concerts).

== Cine-concerts ==
The Prima Vista Quartet is currently the only string quartet to perform original scores to accompany silent films. The cine-concerts are the most original aspect of this ensemble's repertoire which features the following titles :

Feature films :

- The General (Buster Keaton)
- Nosferatu (Friedrich Murnau)
- The Black Pirate (Douglas Fairbanks)
- Orphans of the Storm (David Griffith)
- The Goddess (Wu Yonggang)
- Studies on Paris (André Sauvage)
- Two Stars in the Milky Way (Shi Dongshan)
- Wings (William Wellman)
- The Great War :
1. Women during the War (Alexandre Devarennes)
2. Children during the War (Henri Desfontaines)
3. No Man's land (ECPAD archives)
- The New Babylon (G. Kosinzew & L. Trauberg)

Short films :

- The Haunted House (Buster Keaton)
- One Week (Buster Keaton)
- The Immigrant (Charlie Chaplin)
- A Film Johnnie (George Nichols)
- Entrance of a Train in the Ciotat Station (Louis Lumière)
- The Turn-of-the-Century Barber (Pathé)
- Cello First Prize (Pathé)
- The Policemen's Little Run (André Heuzé)
- Trip around a Star (Gaston Velle)
- Peter Pan Handled (Walter Lantz)
- Felix the Cat Dines and Pines (Otto Messmer)
- The River Rhône (Louis-Ernest Favre)
- Now you tell one (Charlie Bowers)
- Hallucinations of a Fireman (anon.)

Baudime Jam composed or arranged the scores for all these cine-concerts.

== Members ==
- Elzbieta Gladys, violin 1
- Amélie paradis, violin 2
- Baudime Jam, viola
- Frederic Deville, cello
