= Corvinus =

Corvinus is a Latin-language surname. Notable people with the surname include:

== Surname ==
- John Hunyadi (Latin: Ioannes Corvinus), regent (1446–1453) of the Kingdom of Hungary
- King Matthias Corvinus of Hungary (1443–1490)
- The Hunyadi family
- János Corvinus, son of King Matthias Corvinus of Hungary
- László Hunyadi, elder son of John Hunyadi
- Marcus Valerius Messalla Corvinus, considered by legend to be the ancestor of the above
- Marcus Valerius Corvus, possible founder or ancestor of Gens Corvinus
- Peter the Lame's epitaph identifies his ancestral origin in the Royal house of Corvinus.
- Johannes Arnoldi Corvinus (Dutch: Joannes Arnoldsz Ravens), cleric and writer (c.1582–1650)

== Fictional characters ==
- Characters in the Underworld series of films, including
  - Markus Corvinus
  - William Corvinus
  - Alexander Corvinus Known as The Father of All. He was the Immortal father of William and Markus Corvinus.

== See also ==
- Corvinus, a typeface designed by Imre Reiner.
