= Quartet de Barcelona =

Quartet de Barcelona (Catalan pronunciation: [kwəɾˈtɛd də βəɾsəˈlonə], Barcelona String Quartet): Marc Armengol, Edurne Vila, Violin; Ulrike Janssen, Viola; Sergi Boadella, Cello.

The Quartet de Barcelona was created and made its debut in 1997. Since then it has performed in Germany, France and at the most prestigious festivals in Spain, having obtained critics' acclaim throughout. Their repertory includes the most significant works ranging from classicism to contemporary music.

== Invited artists ==
Several artists have collaborated with them such as cellist Marçal Cervera, violinist Garfield Jackson, pianists Jordi Masó, Albert Giménez, Gennady Dzubenko and Leonora Milà, clarinetist Oriol Romaní, flute player Jordi Palau and guitarist Arnaldur Arnalson.

== Repertoire and discography ==
Quartet de Barcelona have premiered works by composers Jordi Paris, David Esterri, Jep Nuix (1955–1998) and Miquel Roger Casamada (b. 1954), some of which have been dedicated to them.

Recorded work includes four recordings of music by Ludwig van Beethoven, Juan Crisóstomo Arriaga, Antonín Dvořák, Dmitri Shostakovich, Eduard Toldrà, Joaquín Turina, Vladimir Blok, Joaquim Homs and Miquel Roger.

- Eduard Toldrà: Vistes al mar (2000)
- Joaquim Homs: Viacrucis (2000) (première world recording)
- Joaquin Turina: La oración del torero (2004)
- Vladimir Blok: Quartet (2004) (première world recording)
