= Corvinus Quartet =

Hungarian string quartet

The Corvinus String Quartet is a Budapest-based string quartet. It was founded in 2003 when its members were students of the Liszt Ference Music Academy and members of the Danubia national youth symphony orchestra.

== Members ==
- Emese Gulyas, violin
- Lugosi Veronika, violin
- Katona Dora, cello
