= San Francisco Performances =

Music showcase organization (founded 1979)

- Formation: 1979
- Founder: Ruth Felt
- Type: Performing arts presenter
- Location: San Francisco Bay Area, U.S.
- Website: www.performances.org

San Francisco Performances is an organization which showcases chamber music, vocal and instrumental recitals, jazz and contemporary dance in the San Francisco Bay area. It was founded by Ruth Felt in 1979. The organization presents "internationally acclaimed and emerging performing artists, introduces innovative programs, and builds new and diversified audiences for the arts through education and outreach activities that also strengthen the local performing arts community."

The organization's goal is to influence the development of the arts. This is accomplished by commissioning new works, offering programs featuring compositions and premieres of the 20th and 21st centuries, and featuring American and international contemporary dance companies. Its current season offers over 200 performances and programs.

Every year, the San Francisco Performances Gala is held in order to raise money for its educational programs - the artist residency programs in Bay Area schools and community outreach to youth and adults.
