= Diego Suárez Corvín =

Diego Suárez Corvín, also known as Diego Suárez Montañés or el Montañés (Urbiés, Asturias, 1552 - Valencia, 1623) was a Spanish soldier and writer. His chronicles of the battles fought by the governor of Oran, Galcerán Borja, against the Muslims in defense of Oran have interest in that the facts are contemporary with the imprisonment of Miguel de Cervantes in Algiers.

A modern edition of his manuscript account Historia del maestre último que fué de Montesa y de su hermano Don Felipe de Borja, la manera como gobernaron las memerables plaças de Orán was edited and published in Madrid 1889.
