= Quartetto Energie Nove =

Quartetto Energie Nove is a string quartet founded in 2008 in Lugano, Switzerland. The group is composed of principal players of the Orchestra della Svizzera Italiana. They have performed at a number of international festivals. They record for Dynamic. The group has made a number of live radio and television recordings for RSI including Beethoven's Quartets Op. 74 and Op. 95.

== Members ==
The quartet's members are:

- Hans Liviabella 1st violin
- Barbara Ciannamea 2nd violin
- Ivan Vukčević viola
- Felix Vogelsang violoncello

== Critical reception ==
The quartet's recording of Prokofiev's String quartets for Dynamic received very favourable reviews. Writing for The Strad, Julian Haylock stated: "Throughout even the thorniest passages they retain absolute technical composure, knife-edge ensemble and remarkable intonational accuracy". The same recording was praised for its "mischievous alacrity" by Jerry Dubbins in Fanfare Magazine. Robert Cummings of ClassicalNet stated that the recordings of the Prokofiev were "at least as good as the best of them".
