= Moyzes Quartet =

Slovak string quartet

The Moyzes Quartet is a Slovak string quartet. It was founded in 1975, with Stanislav Mucha (first violin), František Török (second violin), Alexander Lakatoš (viola) and Ján Slávik (cello). The present first violin (since 2016) is Jozef Horváth.

The members of the quartet studied first at the Academy of Performing Arts in Bratislava, then at the Hochschule fur Musik und darstellende Kunst in Vienna. The quartet has made over 40 recordings, including works by Shostakovich, Dvořák, Smetana, and Slovak composers such as Ján Levoslav Bella, Alexander Moyzes and Eugen Suchoň.

In 2016, the quartet was awarded the Slovak Republic Ministry of Culture Prize. The quartet is a resident ensemble in the Slovak towns of Modra and Skalica.
