= Ion Corvin, Constanța =

Ion Corvin
- Commune
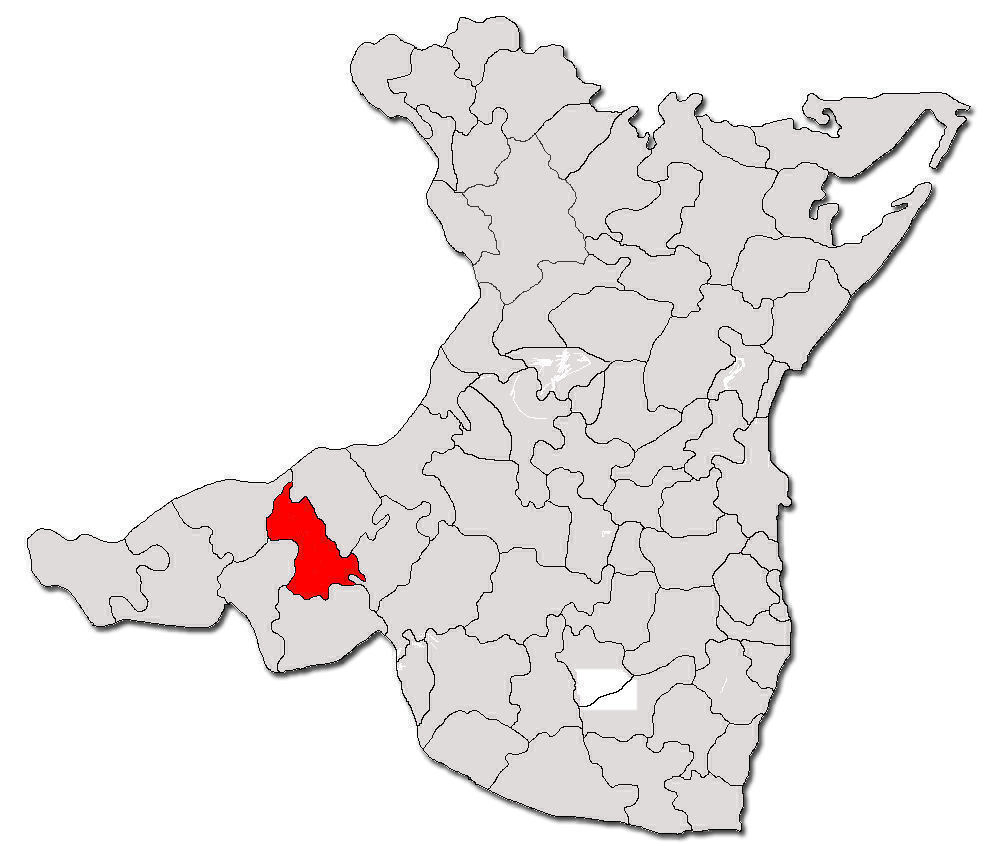
- Location in Constanța County

- Location in Romania
- Coordinates: 44°7′N 27°48′E
- Country: Romania
- County: Constanța
- Subdivisions: Ion Corvin, Brebeni, Crângu, Rariștea, Viile

Government
  - Mayor (2020–2024): Tudorița Floros (PNL)
- Area: 111.30 km^{2} (42.97 sq mi)
- Population (2021-12-01): 1,715
  - Density: 15.41/km^{2} (39.91/sq mi)
- Time zone: UTC+02:00 (EET)
  - Summer (DST): UTC+03:00 (EEST)
- Vehicle reg.: CT
- Website: www.primariaioncorvin.ro

Ion Corvin (Romanian pronunciation: [jon korˈvin]) is a commune in Constanța County, Northern Dobruja, Romania. It includes five villages: Ion Corvin - (named after John Hunyadi; until 1912 Cuzgun, Turkish: Kuzgun); Brebeni Ciucurchioi, Turkish: Çukurköy); Crângu (until 1968 Caramat until 1968, Turkish: Karamat), Rariștea (Gura Orman or Bazarghian), and Viile (until 1964 Beilic until 1964, Turkish: Beylik). Ion Corvin's modern territory also includes incorporates a defunct village, Mircești (formerly Demircea), located at 44°8′N 27°48′E; it was disestablished by Presidential Decree in 1977.

== Demographics ==
At the 2011 census, Ion Corvin had 1,844 Romanians (95.59%), 26 Roma (1.35%), 57 Turks (2.95%), 2 others (0.10%).

== Natives ==
- Dimitrie Batova (1909–1942), Romanian writer, politician, and soldier
