= Formosa Quartet =

The Formosa Quartet is an American string quartet. The quartet won the First Prize and the Amadeus Prize at the Wigmore Hall International String Quartet Competition in 2006, and is committed to championing the indigenous music of under-represented cultures, and to stretching the boundaries of string quartet expression.

The Quartet premiered Taiwanese-American composer Shih-Hui Chen's Returning Souls: Four Pieces on Three Formosan Amis Legends in 2014, and the Quartet's recording of its first commission from Ms. Chen, Fantasia on the Theme of Plum Blossom, was released on the New World Records label in 2013.

From 2014 to 2016 season, Formosa Quartet enjoyed a two-year residency with Art of Élan, a San Diego arts-presenting organization. As ensemble-in-residence, Formosa worked with UCSD professor of composition Lei Liang to create a new piece based on the indigenous music of Taiwan. The culmination of the two-year project was the premiere performance of the commission, Song Recollections, and Formosa's 2019 critically acclaimed record album, From Hungary To Taiwan.

== Discography ==
- Formosa Quartet. Wolfgang Amadeus Mozart, Franz Schubert, Claude Debussy, Hugo Wolf (EMI Classics)
