= Viano Quartet =

American string quartet

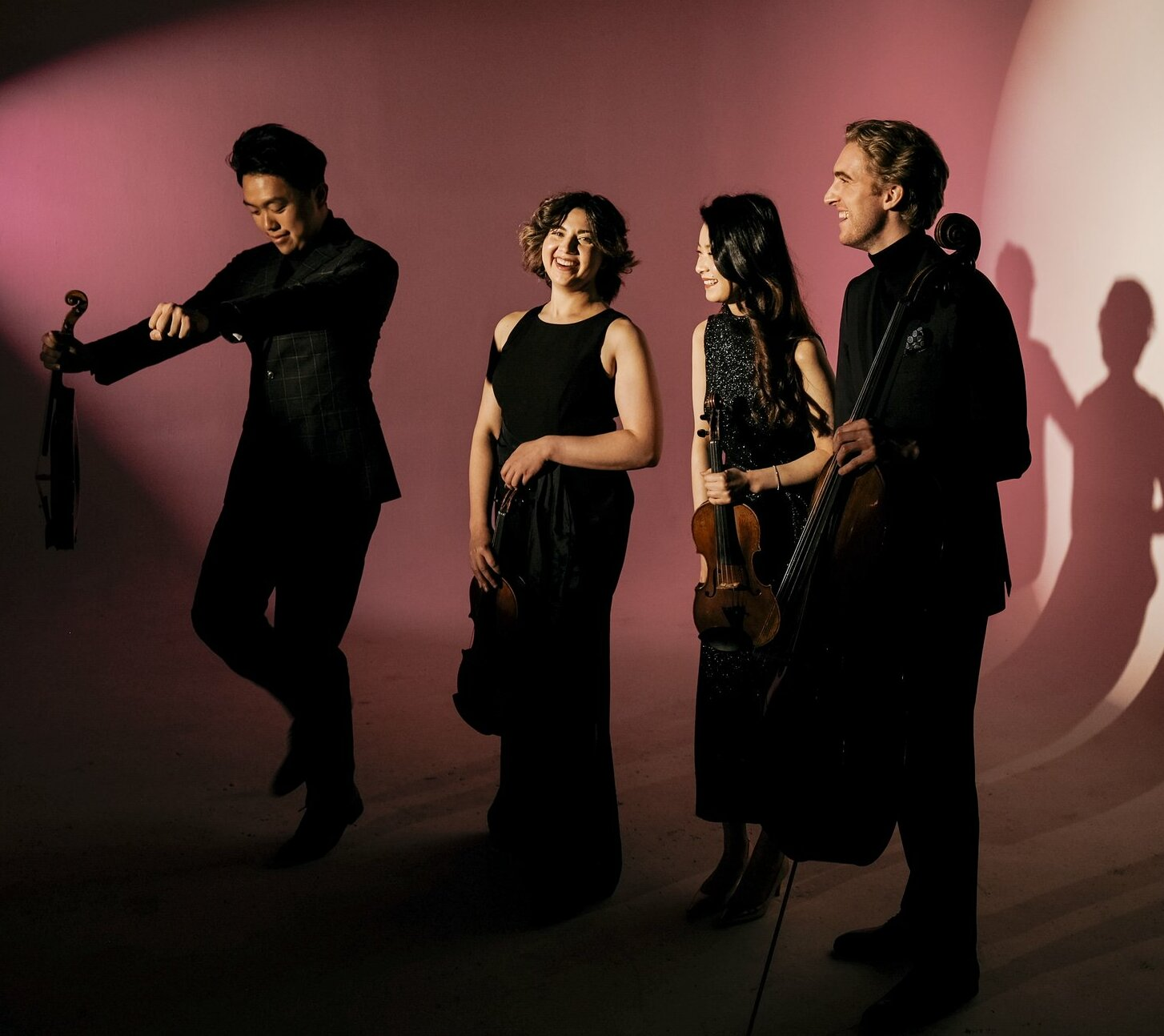
- Viano Quartet in 2023

Background information
- Origin: Los Angeles, California, United States
- Genre: Classical
- Years active: 2015-present
- Label: Opus 3 Artists
- Members: Hao Zhou; Lucy Wang; Aiden Kane; Tate Zawadiuk
- Website: vianoquartet.com

The Viano Quartet is a Canadian-American string quartet comprising violinists Hao Zhou and Lucy Wang, violist Aiden Kane, and cellist Tate Zawadiuk.

Founded in 2015 at the Colburn School in Los Angeles, the quartet has toured extensively and performed in key venues around the world, including Wigmore Hall in London, Konzerthaus Berlin, and Segerstrom Center for the Arts, since winning First Prize at the 2019 Banff International String Quartet Competition.

In their formative years, the quartet achieved notable success on the international stage, winning top prizes at various chamber music competitions including the Osaka, Fischoff, Wigmore Hall, and ENKOR.

The quartet has previously held residencies at the Curtis Institute of Music, the Colburn School, Northern Michigan University, and Meadows School of the Arts at Southern Methodist University. In recent years, the quartet has made appearances with numerous well-renowned musicians including Emanuel Ax, Marc-André Hamelin, Inon Barnatan, Elisso Virsaladze, Paul Coletti, Paul Neubauer, Noah Bendix-Balgley, Hila Plitmann, David Shifrin, and Roberto Díaz.

The quartet is currently based in New York City, in-residence at the Chamber Music Society of Lincoln Center Bowers Program from 2024 to 2027.

In 2025, the quartet was awarded the Avery Fisher Career Grant.

== Origin of Name ==
"Viano" is a portmanteau. According to the group, the name "Viano" symbolizes how the four individual instruments of a string quartet (with each instrument beginning with the letter "v") work harmoniously as one, like a piano, creating a "unified instrument" called the "Viano".
