= Academy of Performing Arts in Prague =

University in the Czech Republic

Coordinates: 50°05′15″N 14°24′07″E

- Akademie múzických umění v Praze
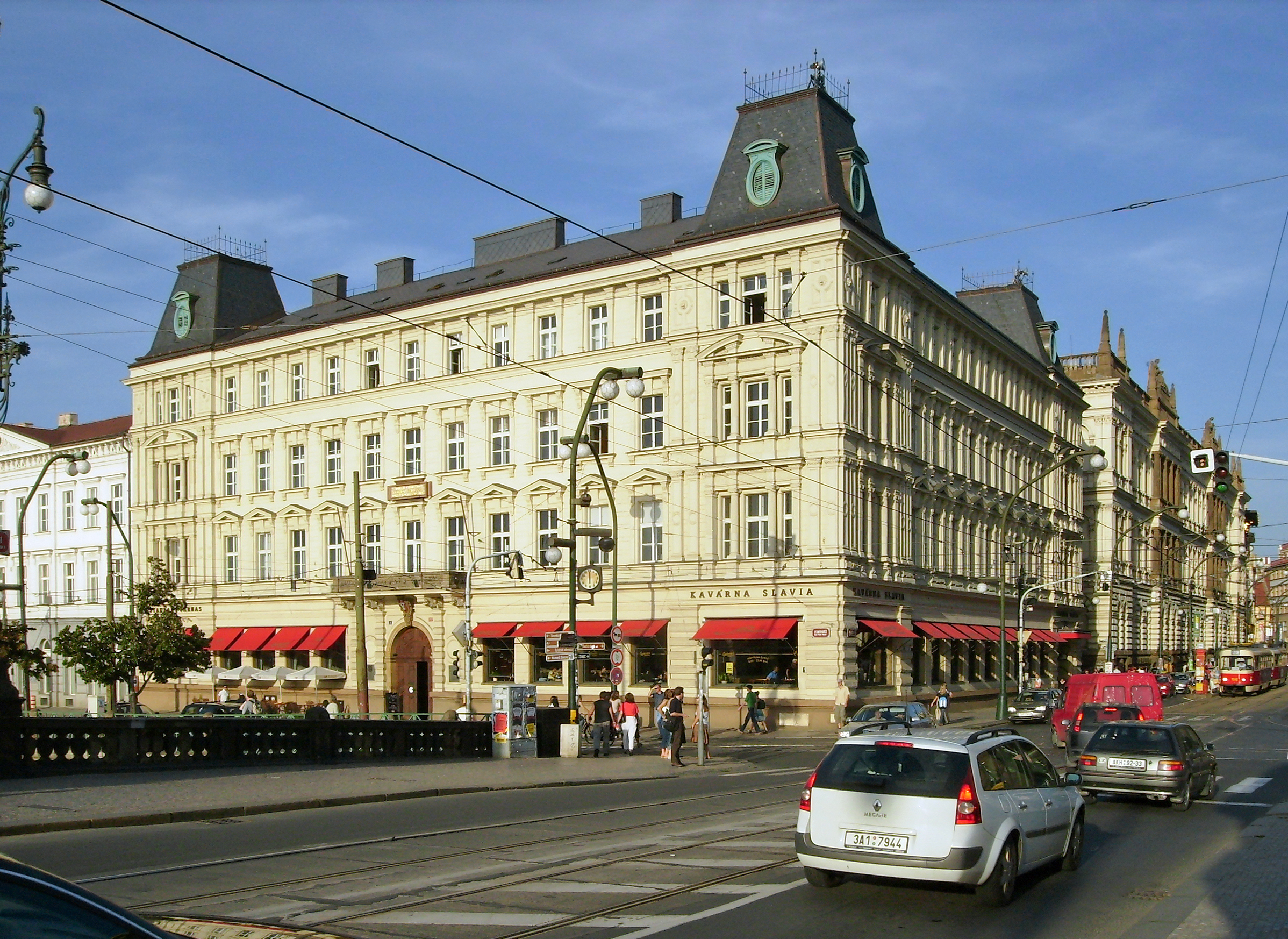
- The Hartig and Lichtenštejn Palaces house the rectorate and Music and Theatre Faculties of the Academy of Performing Arts in Prague.
- Type: Public
- Established: 1945
- Rector: Jan Hancil
- Students: 1,541
- Doctoral students: 147
- Location: Prague, Czech Republic
- Website: www.amu.cz

The Academy of Performing Arts in Prague (Czech: Akademie múzických umění v Praze, AMU) is a university in the centre of Prague, Czech Republic, specialising in the study of music, dance, drama, film, television and multi-media. It is the largest art school in the Czech Republic, with more than 350 educators and researchers, and 1500 students.

The academy consists of three faculties: a Film and TV School (FAMU); Music and Dance Faculty (HAMU); and Theatre Faculty (DAMU), offering Bachelor, Masters, and Doctoral level courses, as well as conducting artistic research, and in some departments also research in art history and theory. AMU has two cross-faculty pedagogical facilities: a Languages Centre and a Sports, Rehabilitation and Movement Centre. The university also has two facilities outside Prague designed for residential multi-day creative projects.

== History ==
The Academy of Performing Arts was founded by a Presidential Decree of 27 October 1945, and opened to students the next year, in the winter semester of 1946. The establishment of the school was initiated by a group of artists and writers, including Jindřich Honzl, Jiří Frejka, and František Troster, during World War II. Professors of the older Prague Conservatory also supported the idea of transforming the former maestro school into a university. Writers, artists and other film-makers with practical experience in the film industry, including Jaroslav Bouček, Karel Plicka, Otakar Vávra, Ivan Olbracht, Vítězslav Nezval, and Antonín Brousil, contributed to the school's future curriculum, designing it to reflect new trends in post-war film development. Later the Film Studio and the DISK theatre, belonging to the Theatre Faculty, were added. The Opera Studio of the Music Faculty also uses the DISK theatre. When the medium of television emerged, the Film and TV School began offering programmes for TV specialists. It also has a department with a still photography curriculum.

== Faculties ==
The Academy of Performing Arts consists of a Film and TV School (FAMU), Music and Dance Faculty, Theatre Faculty, and a rector's office. Besides the DISK theatre and Film Studio, the Academy's teaching facilities include sound and photography studios, laboratories, workshops, dancing and training halls. The Lichtenštejn Palace, renovated in 1991, contains a grand concert hall dedicated to the Czech composer Bohuslav Martinů and the Inspirace theatre.

The Academy owns out-of-town practice and teaching centres in Poněšice and Beroun. The Study and Training Centre in Poněšice, South Bohemia, is situated on the River Vltava River, and is used for special training programmes, sports and language courses for students and other users. The Study, Training and Accommodation Centre in Beroun, 30 kilometres west of Prague, is used for training and study activities and workshops for DAMU, HAMU, FAMU and Studio FAMU.

=== Theatre Faculty (DAMU) ===
The Theatre Faculty of the Academy of Performing Arts in Prague (DAMU) was established in 1945 as part of the newly created arts university. Teachers at the faculty have included prominent personalities of modern Czech theatre including Otomar Krejča, František Tröster, Ivan Vyskočil. DAMU is a member of the European League of Institutes of the Arts (ELIA) and the European network on cultural management and policy (ENCATC).

=== Film and TV School (FAMU) ===
The Film and TV School of the Academy of Performing Arts in Prague (FAMU) was established in 1946, as the world's fifth university-level arts school with a programme in film education. At the end of the 1960s, a number of the school's graduates emerged as part of the Czechoslovak New Wave movement, including Věra Chytilová, Miloš Forman, and Jiří Menzel. Later graduates of the school to receive international acclaim included Agnieszka Holland, Emir Kusturica, and Jan Svěrák. FAMU is a founding member of the International Association of Film and Television Schools (CILECT), and a member of ELIA and the European Grouping of Film and Television Schools (GEECT).

=== Music and Dance Faculty (HAMU) ===
The Music and Dance Faculty of the Academy of Performing Arts (Czech: Hudební fakulta Akademie múzických umění v Praze; HAMU) was established in 1945 as one of the academy's three components, as a successor to the master school of the Prague Conservatory. The school provides education in the fields of music and dance in Czech and English at Bachelor, Masters and doctoral levels. The faculty has 12 departments (the Departments of String, Keyboard, Wind and Percussion Instruments, Jazz Interpretation, Voice and Opera Directing, Musical Sound, Theory and History of Music, Conducting, Composition and Pantomime). The faculty also includes three research facilities: the Institute of Music Theory, the Institute for Dance Theory, and the Musical Acoustics Research Centre (MARC). HAMU is the organiser of the orchestral cycle "The Best" and the Skrznaskrz festival, which features collaborations between all three AMU faculties as well as other fine arts schools.

== Academics ==
The academy offers bachelor's, master's, and doctoral programmes in art of music, art of dance, art of drama, art of film, TV and photography, and new media. Bachelor's programmes usually last three years and students receive a bachelor of arts degree (BA). Master's programmes usually take two further years. After passing the state examination, students receive a master of arts degree (MA). Doctoral programmes are established at all the faculties. On passing a doctoral examination and presenting a doctoral theses, students are awarded doctorates (PhD). The academy offers other special courses outside the regular academic programme, some of which can be used as credit.

Students at the academy are only accepted after completing secondary school education and successfully passing entrance exams. Each faculty has its own requirements for the entrance exams.

The official language of instruction of the course units is Czech, but each faculty offers some degree programs in English. A limited number of short-term courses are taught in English or in German, and for others a preparatory course in Czech is necessary.

== Facilities and student services ==
AMU has a library with more than 180,000 volumes of academic literature, sound recordings and audio-visual works, and students are also entitled to use other libraries free of charge, such as the University library and the library of the Czech Academy of Sciences. Students of the academy have free or discounted entry to some cultural events, such as theatre performances, concerts, exhibitions, lectures and films. The academy has co-operative links with other schools in the Czech Republic and internationally, which include artistic competitions, festivals, and reciprocal exchange performances.

AMU's facilities include theatres, film and television studios, and concert halls. A university publishing service, AMU Press (NAMU), publishes literature about AMU artistic activities. The final projects of students studying disciplines with a significant graphic component are exhibited in the AMU Gallery (GAMU), which also hosts one-off thematic exhibitions. AMU has two halls of residence: one on Hradební Street in the centre of Prague, reconstructed in the academic year 2006/07, and another on the southern outskirts of Prague. The academy's Language Centre provides classes in English, German, French, Spanish, Italian, Russian and Czech for students and employees. The AMU Sports, Rehabilitation and Movement Centre organises various sports activities for students.

== Notable alumni ==
=== FAMU ===
Several of the directors considered part of the Czechoslovak New Wave attended FAMU, including Miloš Forman (b. 1932), Jiří Menzel (b. 1938), Jan Němec, Juraj Jakubisko, Věra Chytilová, Ivan Passer, and Vojtěch Jasný.

Also among FAMU's alumni are a group of Yugoslav film directors known as the Praška filmska škola (Prague Film School) who rose to prominence in the 1970s after graduating from FAMU. Five prominent Yugoslav directors born from 1944 to 1947 attended classes at FAMU: Lordan Zafranović (b. 1944), Srđan Karanović (b. 1945), Goran Marković (b. 1946), Goran Paskaljević (b. 1947), and Rajko Grlić (b. 1947). Emir Kusturica (b. 1954) also attended FAMU, graduating in 1978, and is also sometimes considered a member of the Praška škola. Cinematographers Živko Zalar (who has worked with Grlić, Karanović and Marković), Predrag Pega Popović (who has worked with Zafranović and Marković), Vilko Filač (who has worked with Kusturica), Valentin Perko, and Pavel Grzinčič, also studied at FAMU.

=== HAMU ===
- Sylvie Bodorová (born 1954), Czech composer
- Karel Fiala (born 1925), Czech operatic tenor, studied at HAMU 1952–1955
- Michaela Fukačová (born 1959), Czech cellist
- Simon Gjoni (1925–1991), Albanian composer and conductor, studied at HAMU 1952–1958
- Pavel Hůla (1952–2021), Czech violinist and music teacher, was both a student and professor at HAMU
- Hana Jonášová, Czech operatic soprano
- Jana Jonášová (born 1943), Czech operatic soprano, studied at HAMU and is also a current faculty member
- Naděžda Kniplová (1932–2020), Czech operatic soprano, studied at HAMU 1954–1958 faculty member since 1991
- Josef Páleníček (1914–1991), Czech pianist, was a professor at HAMU from 1963
- Ivan Romanoff (1914–1997), Canadian conductor and violinist, studied at HAMU 1947–1949
- Edvard Schiffauer (born 1942), Czech composer
- Norodom Sihamoni (born 1953), King of Cambodia, studied classical dance and music at HAMU, graduating in 1975
- Olivier Thouin, Canadian violinist
- Saša Večtomov (1930–1989), Czech cellist and music teacher, was both a student and professor at HAMU
- Ludmila Vernerová (born 1962), Czech operatic soprano
- Tomáš Víšek (born 1957), Czech pianist, studied at HAMU from 1976 to 1984
