= Zoran Đorđević =

Zoran Đorđević may refer to:

- Zoran Đorđević (football manager) (born 1952), Serbian international football manager
- Zoran Đorđević (director) (born 1962), Serbian award-winning film, television and theater director, screenwriter, art photographer and producer living in Brazil
- Zoran Đorđević (politician) (born 1970), Serbian Minister of Defense (2016–2017)
