= Mozartinterpretationspreis =

Austrian music award

The Mozartinterpretationspreis (Mozart Interpretation Prize) was a music award named after Wolfgang Amadeus Mozart, administered by the Mozartgemeinde Wien (Vienna Mozart Society) and sponsored by the Austrian Ministry of Education and Culture. It was awarded from 1963 to 1998.

== Recipients ==
The 35 recipients have been:

- Wiener Trio, 1963
- Wiener Sängerknaben, 1964
- Weller Quartett, 1965
- Werner Krenn with Ralph Weikert, 1966
- Die Wiener Solisten, 1967
- Capella Academia der Wiener Akademie für Musik, 1968
- Heinz Medjimorec with Günter Pichler, 1969
- Rudolf Buchbinder, 1970
- Gerhard Zeller, 1971
- Agnes Grossman, 1972
- Rainer Küchl, 1973
- Chor und Orchester des BRG IX, 1974
- Franz Schubert-Quartett, 1975
- Peter Weber, 1976
- Regine Winkelmayer, 1977
- Michael Werba, 1978
- Christian Simonis, 1979
- Christian Altenburger, 1980
- Gabriele Fontana, 1981
- Karin Adam, 1982
- Igo Koch, 1983
- Hagen Quartet, 1984
- Elisabeth Schadler, 1985
- Arnold Schönberg Choir, 1989
- Ensemble Oktogon, 1990
- Kurt Azesberger, 1991
- Wiener Streichsextett, 1992
- Angelika Kirchschlager, 1993
- Stefan Vladar, 1994
- Anton Scharinger, 1995
- Seifert-Quartett, 1996
- Barbara Moser, 1997
- Till Fellner, 1998

== Sources ==
- "Mozartgemeinde Wien – Preise & Auszeichnungen" (in German).
- "Mozartgemeinde Wien – Preisträger" (in German).
