= Wiener Flötenuhr =

Austrian music award

The Wiener Flötenuhr or Viennese Musical Clock is a prize given by the Mozart Society of Vienna (German: Mozartgemeinde Wien) for notable recordings of works by Mozart.

== History ==
The Musical Clock was designed by the sculptor Fritz Tiefenthaler for the first award ceremony in 1969. It is a relief gilt iron plate with a historical music box. The left side reads "Schallplattenpreis Flötenuhr", or "Record prize Musical clock", and the right reads "Mozartgemeinde Wien", or "Mozart Society of Vienna". It was originally presented annually, but for several years has only been presented every second year. The suggestion for the design was made by the then honorary chairman of the Mozart Society, inspired by Mozart's late compositions for music boxes and mechanical organs (for example, K. 594 and 608). Until 1982, the record company was awarded a replica of the Viennese Musical Clock, while the artist was given a certificate on which was shown the Leipzig musical clock, which was the model for the Viennese version. Since the late 1980s, the tradition of awarding a replica of the clock has been dispensed with for financial reasons. From the 1990s, the artists have been rewarded directly. As part of a long-standing tradition, each prize is presented in a 'winner's concert'. Today, the original Viennese musical clock, along with the archives of the Mozart Society, reside in the Vienna City and State archives.

== Recipients of the Wiener Flötenuhr ==
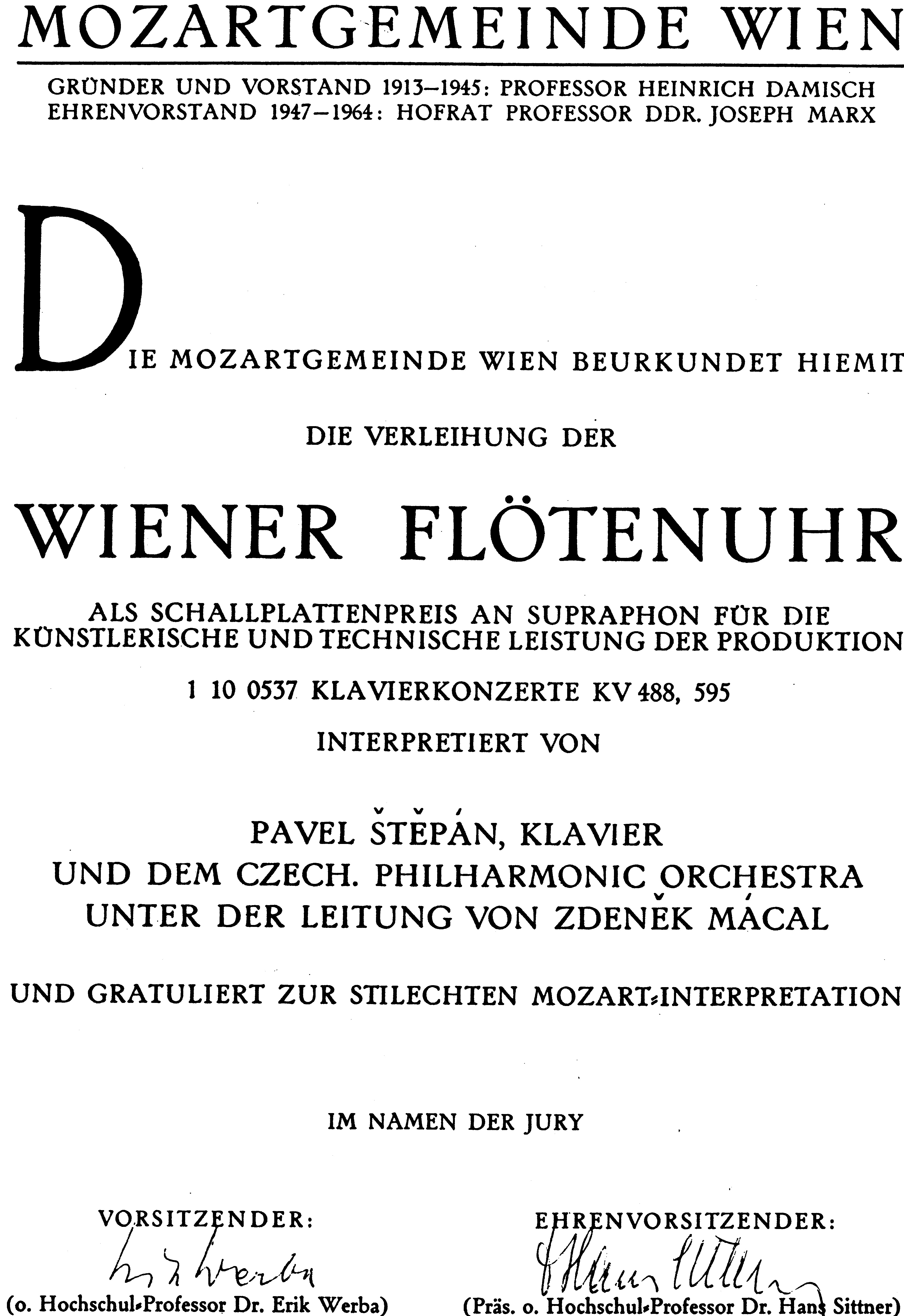
Wiener Flötenuhr 1971

=== 1970s and 1980s ===
- Vienna Philharmonic
- Camerata Salzburg
- Dresdner Staatskapelle
- Academy of St Martin in the Fields
- London Philharmonic Orchestra
- Nikolaus Harnoncourt
- Czech Philharmonic
- Pavel Štěpán
- Karl Böhm
- Jana Jonášová
- Neville Marriner
- Bernhard Klee
- Edda Moser
- Peter Schreier
- Maurizio Pollini
- Jörg Demus
- Amadeus Quartet
- Polish Chamber Orchestra
- Alban Berg Quartett
- Küchl Quartett

=== 1989–present, new format ===
- András Schiff, 1989
- Roland Batik and the Artis-Quartett, 1991
- Thomas Zehetmair, 1992
- Ensemble Wien, 1993
- Wolfgang Schulz and Hansjörg Schellenberger, 1995
- Alban Berg Quartet, 1996
- Ruth Ziesak, 1997
- Bo Skovhus, 1998
- Margarethe Babinsky, 1999
- Anton Scharinger, 2001
- Edith Lienbacher, 2003
- Barbara Moser / Joanna Madroszkiewicz, 2005
- Haydn Trio Eisenstadt, 2007
- Bertrand de Billy, 2009
- Michael Schade, 2011
- Wiener Sängerknaben, 2013
- Luca Pisaroni, 2015
- Kristian Bezuidenhout, 2019
