= Jana Jonášová =

Czech opera singer (born 1943)

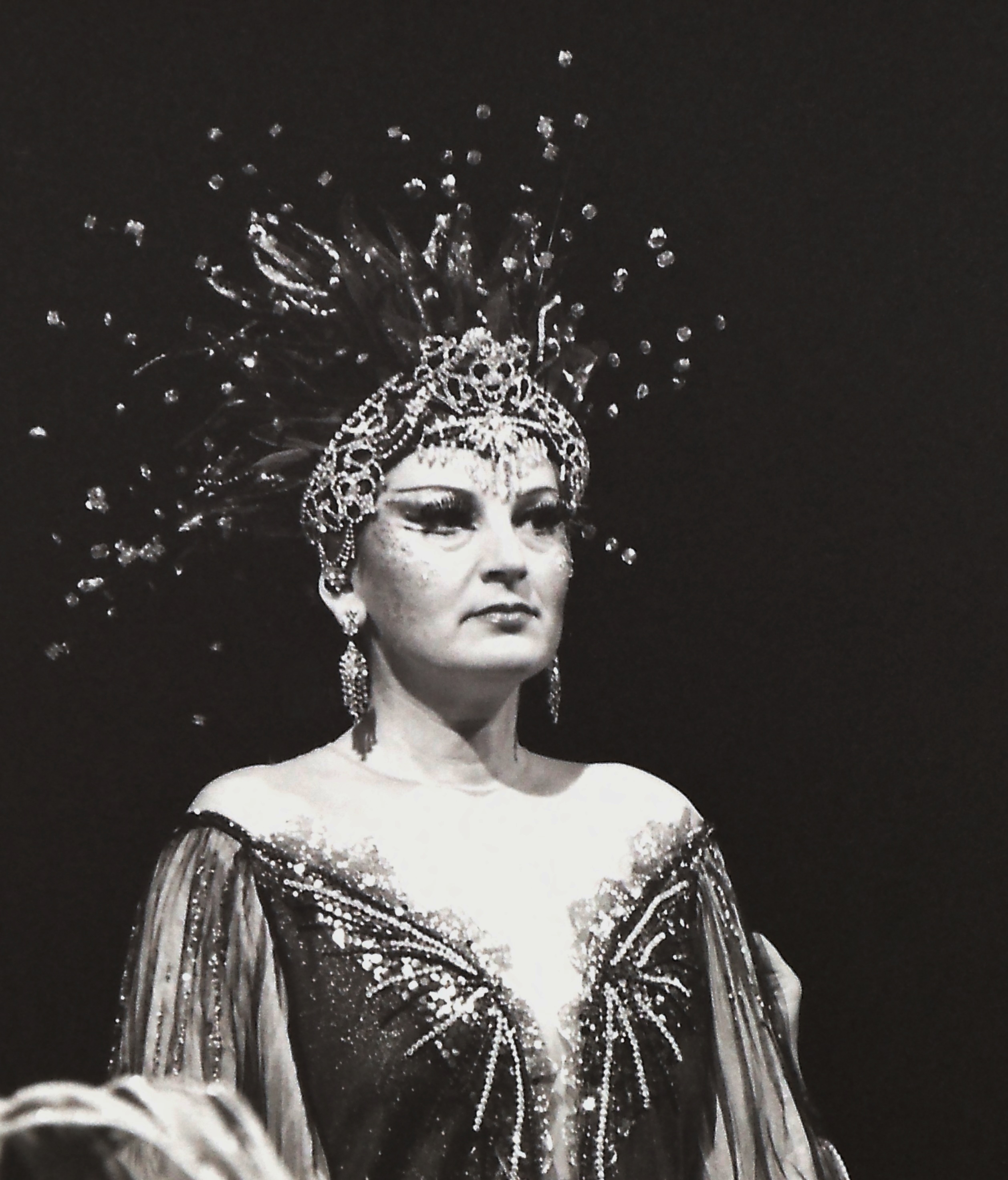

Background information
- Born: 28 April 1943 (age 82); Plzeň, Protectorate of Bohemia and Moravia
- Genres: Opera
- Occupation: Singer
- Instrument: Vocals

Jana Jonášová (born 28 April 1943) is a Czech opera singer. One of the most important Czech coloratura sopranos of her generation, she has had an active international career at the world's major opera houses and concert stages for roughly four decades. As an opera singer she performed a varied repertoire from a variety of musical periods and in many languages. She drew particular acclaim for her portrayal of Mozart heroines and roles from the standard Czech repertory. In 1970 she joined the National Theatre in Prague where she was a member for more than three decades.

As a concert singer, Jonášová assailed an equally diverse repertoire but is chiefly remembered for performances of works by baroque composers like Johann Sebastian Bach, Carl Philipp Emanuel Bach, Georg Friedrich Handel, Georg Philipp Telemann, and Antonio Vivaldi. Her voice is preserved on a number of concert, opera, and solo recordings made with the Supraphon and ORFEO labels among others. Although she still occasionally performs in concert, she retired from the opera stage in the early 2000s. She is currently on the voice faculty at the Academy of Performing Arts in Prague.

== Biography ==
Born in Plzeň, Jonášová studied singing at the Prague Conservatory with Bendlová and then at the Academy of Performing Arts in Prague with Teodor Šrubař. She made her professional opera debut in 1965 at the Liberec Theatre as Konstanze in Wolfgang Amadeus Mozart's The Abduction from the Seraglio. That same year she became involved with the Chamber Opera Prague. She remained committed to the Liberec Theatre through 1970 and then joined the National Theatre in Prague where she initially sang minor roles and worked in the opera chorus.

In 1973 Jonášová was promoted to principal sopranos at the National Theatre and she quickly became one of the house's most important artists. Among the large number of roles she has performed with the house include Susanne in Le Nozze di Figaro, Fiordiligi in Cosi fan tutte, the Queen of the Night in The Magic Flute, Rosina in The Barber of Seville, Norina in Don Pasquale, Gilda in Rigoletto, Violetta in La Traviata, and Zerbinetta in Ariadne auf Naxos.

On the international stage she has performed as a guest artist at numerous opera houses since the early 1970s. Her performance credits include appearances at the Berlin State Opera, the National Theatre in Belgrade, the Bolshoi Theatre, the Croatian National Theatre in Zagreb, the Edinburgh Festival, the Grand Théâtre de Genève, the Hungarian State Opera House, La Monnaie, De Nederlandse Opera, the Opéra National de Bordeaux, the Opéra Royal de Wallonie, the Semperoper, the Teatro Massimo, and the Teatro Real among others. In 1977 she made her first appearance at the Salzburg Festival performing a solo concert of Mozart arias which was recorded on the Supraphon label.

Jonášová has made several recordings of complete operas and the concert repertoire with a variety of music labels. Of particular note is her 1981 recording of the role of Katerina in Bohuslav Martinů's The Greek Passion under the baton of Charles Mackerras. The recording one numerous awards, including the Grand Prix audiovisuel de L'Europe, the Grand Prix de l'Académie du disque Français, and the Orphee d'or de L'Academie Nationale du disque lyrique. She has also recorded a number of solo albums, recording arias by Mozart, Verdi, Strauss, among others in addition to concert repertoire. She has notably recorded several song cycles by such 20th century Czech composers as Pavel Bořkovec, Jaroslav Ježek, Iša Krejčí, and Jan Seidel.

Jonášová is a past recipient of the Wiener Flötenuhr and in 1985 she was honored with the title of People's Artist of the USSR. Her daughter Hana Jonášová is also a successful operatic soprano.
