= Rudolf Adler =

Czech film director and academic (1941–2025)

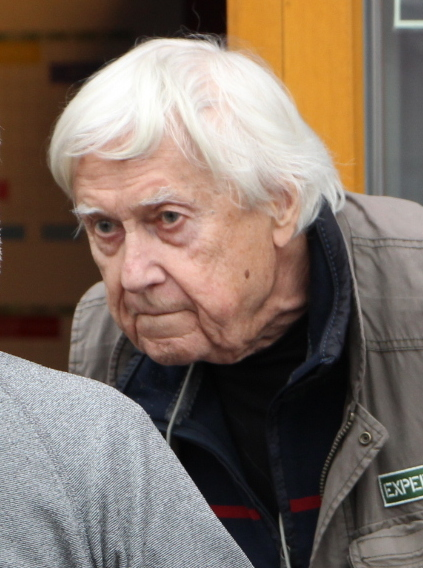
- Adler in 2024
- Born: 25 May 1941; Brno, Protectorate of Bohemia and Moravia (now Czech Republic)
- Died: 10 November 2025 (aged 84); Hradec Králové, Czech Republic
- Occupations: Film director, academic
- Years active: 1978–2024
- Spouse: Jarmila Adler Šlaisová

Rudolf Adler (25 May 1941 – 10 November 2025) was a Czech film director, screenwriter and film educator.

== Life and career ==
Rudolf Adler studied film directing at the Film and TV School of the Academy of Performing Arts in Prague, graduating in 1966. Concomitantly Adler wrote the libretto for composer Zdeněk Pololáník's ballet Mechanismus; their collaborative work premiered at the FX Šalda Theater, Liberec, in 1964.

When Czechoslovakia hosted joint Warsaw Pact military maneuvers in September 1966, Rudolf Adler, then an Army filmmaker, was sent to south South Bohemia to document war games.

At a time when Czechoslovakia's communist regime sought control of the arts, making it difficult if not impossible for the public to gain access to unofficial ideas and expressions, Adler, alongside colleagues Ivan Balaďa and Vladimír Drha, created subversive films. Some of their films qualify as avant-garde and/or auteur films, even though they were produced by Czechoslovak Army Film Studio.

He directed more than 100 films. Among them are Strepy pro Evu (1978), Chlapská dovolenka (1988), and the documentary Masks, Jesters, Demons (2002), in which he and cowriter Ludvík Baran examine historic, ritualistic uses of face masks in the Czech lands and throughout the world.

From the late 1980s, Adler taught documentary filmmaking at the Film and TV School of the Academy of Performing Arts in Prague (FAMU), serving at different times in capacities of professor and department head (1990–1994).

In 2020, the Association for Film and Audiovisual Education awarded him the Boris Jachnin Award for lifelong contributions to the field. Adler died in Hradec Králové, Czech Republic on 10 November 2025, at the age of 84.
