= Rainer Küchl =

Austrian violinist

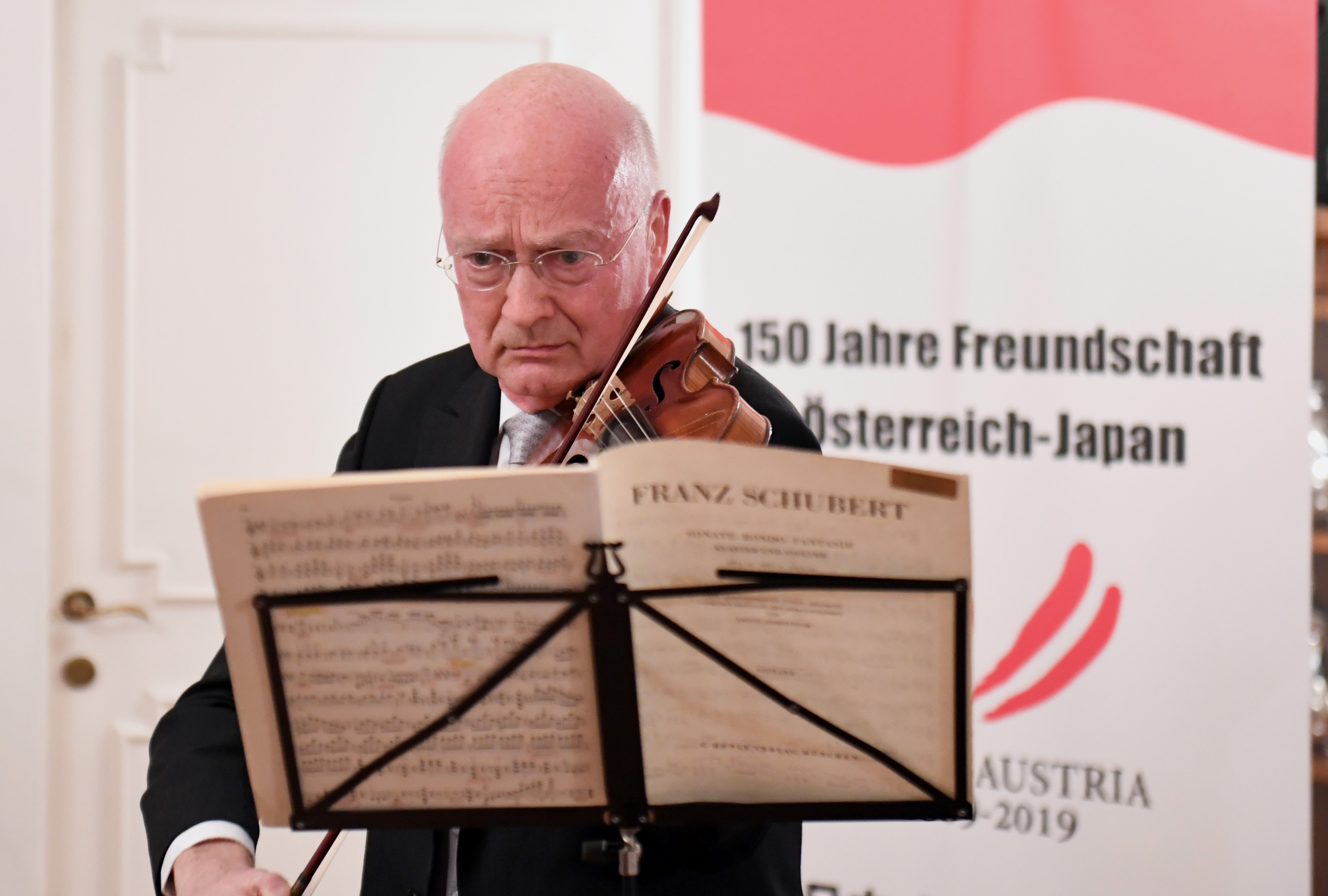
Rainer Küchl in 2019

Rainer Küchl is an Austrian violinist who was born in Waidhofen an der Ybbs, Austria, 25 August 1950.

== Background ==
He started to play the violin at the age of 11, and was admitted to the University of Music and Performing Arts, Vienna, at the age of 14, where he studied with Franz Samohyl. From 1971 to 2016 he was concertmaster of the Vienna Philharmonic Orchestra and also of the orchestra of the Vienna State Opera.

As a soloist he has worked with some of the world's most famous orchestras and conductors, such as Karl Böhm, Leonard Bernstein, Claudio Abbado, Riccardo Muti, Carlos Kleiber, Valery Gergiev, and Simon Rattle.

In 1973 he founded the string quartet Küchl Quartett which is now known as the Wiener Musikverein Quartett. Since 1976, the quartet has its own concert series at the Brahmssaal of the Musikverein Vienna.

Rainer Küchl is a professor at the University of Music and Performing Arts Vienna since 1982. Among his pupils were Wolfgang David and Joji Hattori.

Rainer Küchl plays 'The Chaconne' by Antonio Stradivari, Cremona 1725, provided as a loan by Oesterreichische Nationalbank.

== Decorations and awards ==
- 1973: Mozart Interpretation Prize for solo performances
- 1978: Mozart Medal of the Mozart Society of Vienna (award of Küchl Quartet)
- 1985: Gold Medal of the province of Salzburg
- 1988: Austrian Cross of Honour for Science and Art
- 1994: Grand Decoration of Honour for Services to the Republic of Austria
- 2001: Honorary Member of the Vienna State Opera
- 2010: Order of the Rising Sun, Gold Rays with Neck Ribbon – Contributed to the promotion of the cultural relations and mutual understanding between Japan and the Republic of Austria
