= Sacha Pecaric =

Croatian born rabbi (born 1965)

Rabbi Sacha Pecaric
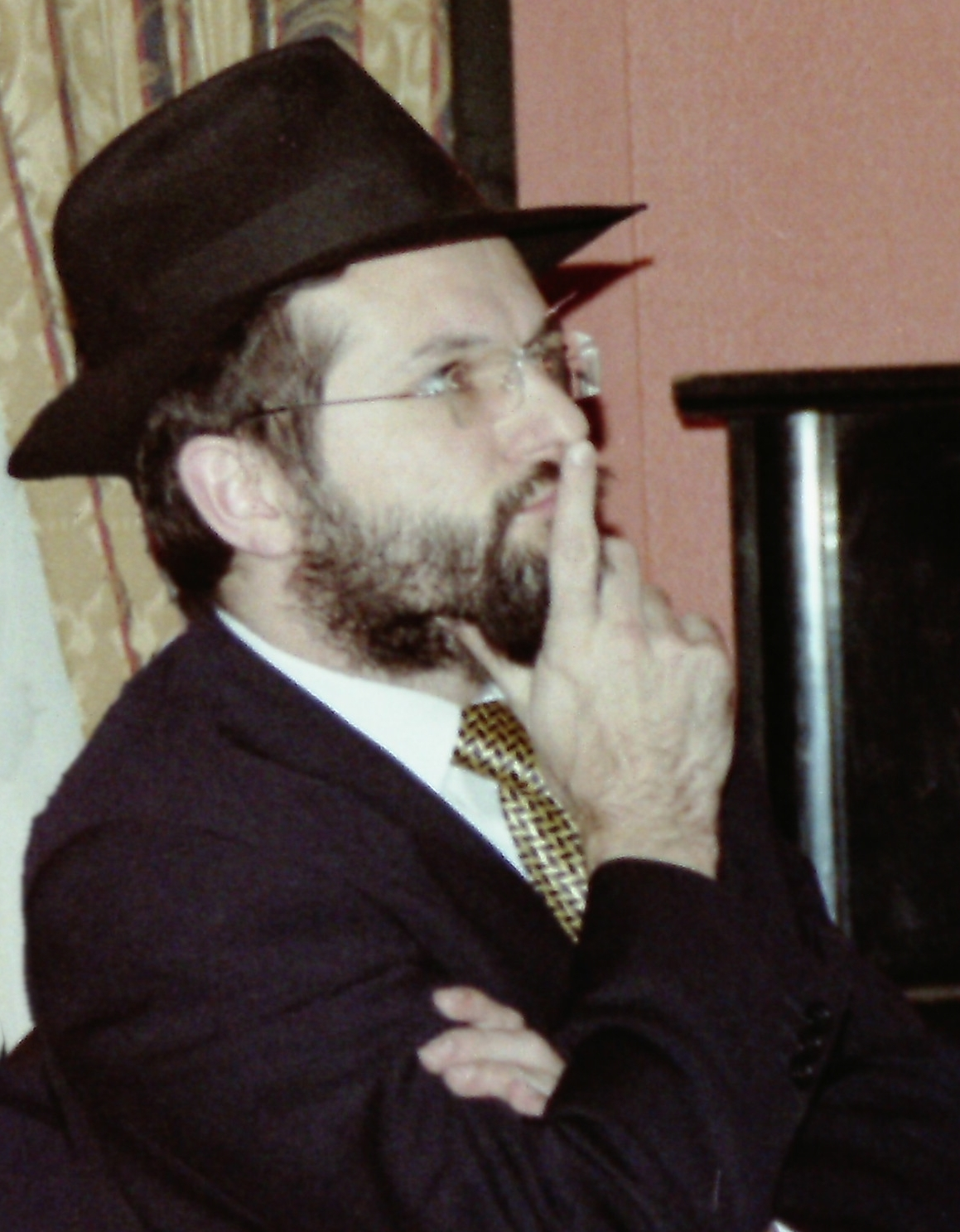
- Pecaric in 1999
- Born: May 5, 1965 (age 61); Rijeka, SFR Yugoslavia (now Croatia)
- Occupation: Rabbi

Sacha Pecaric (born 1965 in Rijeka) is a Croatian-born rabbi.

== Education and scholarship ==
After studies in Prague, Pecaric continued to study at the rabbinic department of the Yeshiva University in New York City, where he obtained rabbinical ordination, and the Department of Philosophy of Columbia University (M.A.) and FAMU in Prague (Ph.D.). He lived in Kraków where he ran the Ronald S. Lauder Foundation, aimed at providing education to the small local Jewish community as well as other local people, and where he set up Pardes Lauder, a Jewish religious publishing house which has published more than 30 books, including a prayer book and Haggada for Passover.

Pecaric was the author of the first translation of the Torah from Hebrew to Polish to be done by a Jew since the Second World War. His translation, made independently of existing Polish translations, includes – Bereshit (Genesis, 2001), Shemot (Exodus, 2003), Vajikra (Leviticus, 2005) and Bemidbar (Numbers, 2005) and Devarim (Deuteronomium, 2006).
