= Film and TV School of the Academy of Performing Arts in Prague =

Film school in the Czech Republic

Coordinates: 50°4′54.03″N 14°24′47.69″E

- Filmová a televizní fakulta Akademie múzických umění v Praze
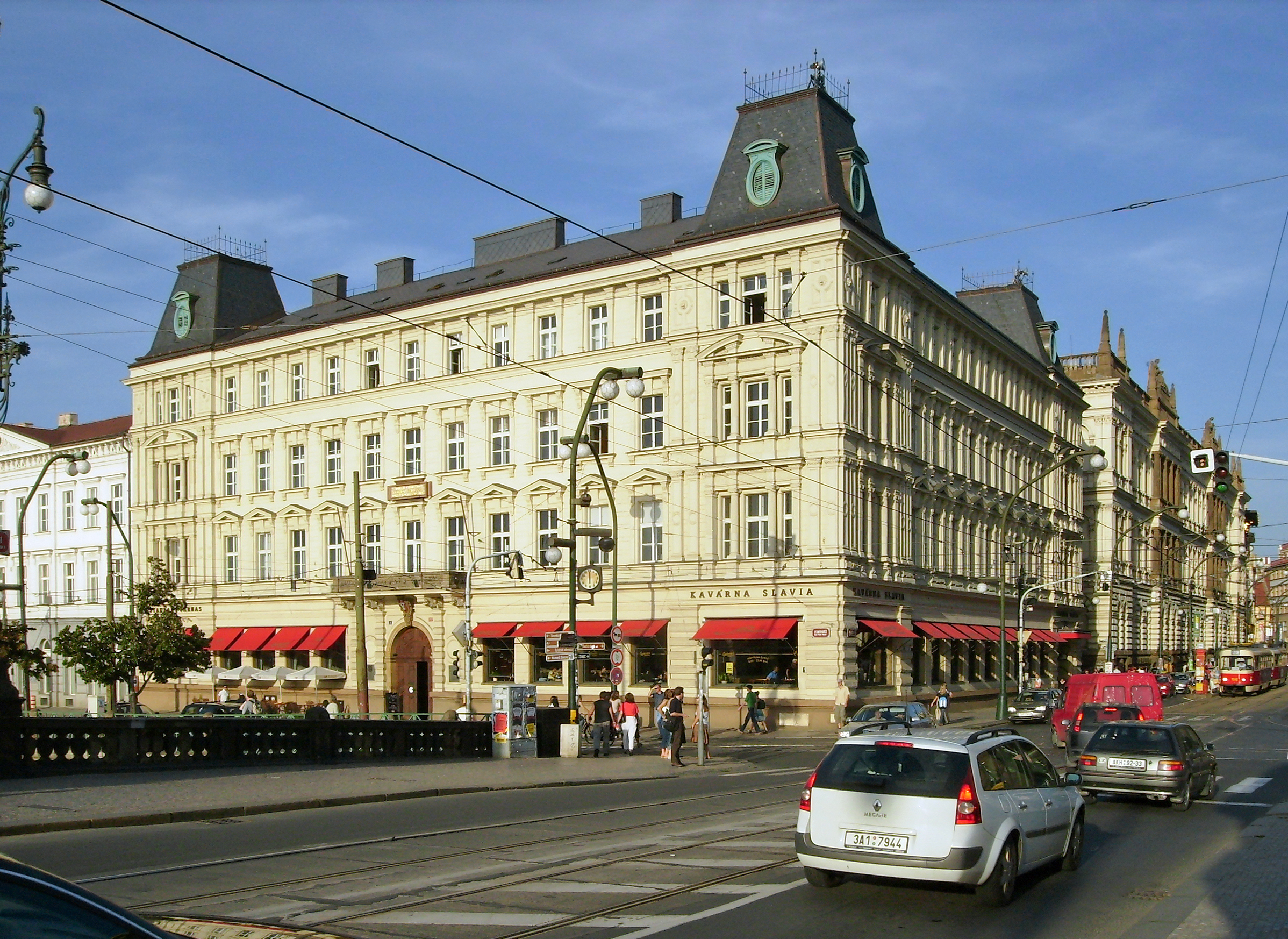
- Type: Public
- Established: 1946/47
- Dean: David Čeněk
- Location: Prague, Czech Republic
- Website: https://www.famu.cz/en/

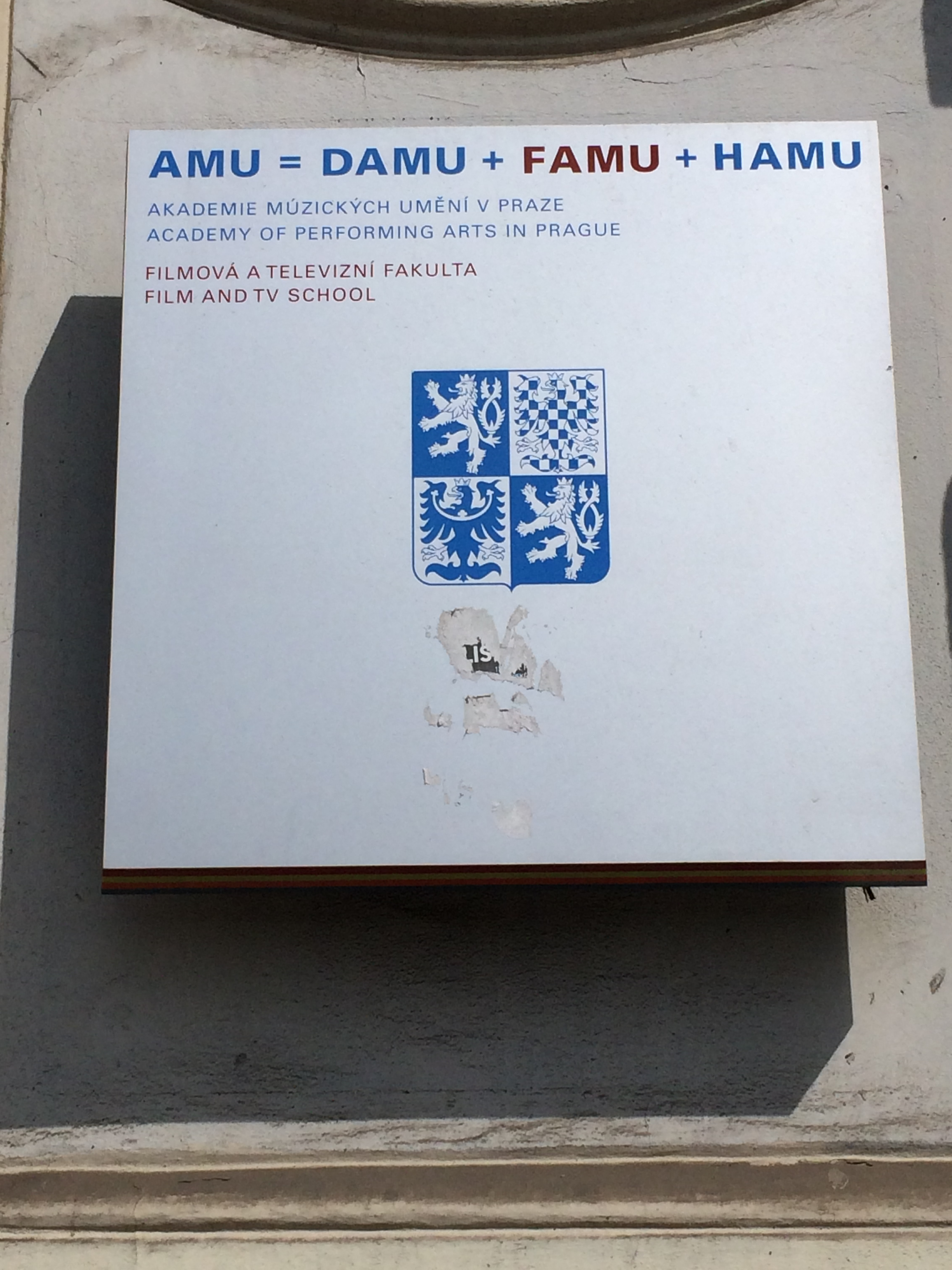
FAMU sign outside of the school's building in Prague

The Film and TV School of the Academy of Performing Arts in Prague (Czech: Filmová a televizní fakulta Akademie múzických umění v Praze) or FAMU is a film school in Prague, Czech Republic, founded in 1946 as one of three branches of the Academy of Performing Arts in Prague. It is the fifth oldest film school in the world. The teaching language on most courses at FAMU is Czech, but FAMU also runs certain courses in English. The school has repeatedly been included on lists of the best film schools in the world by The Hollywood Reporter.

In the 1960s and 1970s, several young directors from Yugoslavia were FAMU students (Rajko Grlić, Srđan Karanović, Emir Kusturica, Goran Marković, Goran Paskaljević and Lordan Zafranović). All of these directors would become very successful in the following decades, prompting the coinage of the term Praška filmska škola ("Prague film school"), or Praški talas ("Prague wave"), which is sometimes considered a prominent subgenre of the Yugoslav cinema.

== History ==
The school was established between 1946 and 1948, as one of the three branches of Academy of Performing Arts in Prague (AMU), the fifth oldest film school in the world after Moscow, Berlin, Rome, and Paris. The school was initially based on the 4th floor of Havlickova 13, before moving in 1948 to the Vančura building at Klimenská 4, which would house theoretical and also some practical tuition until 1960. The new school also shared some facilities with the Czechoslovak Film Institute. However, when the institute was dissolved in 1949 by the new communist director of Czechoslovak State Film, Oldřich Macháček, many of the former staff became tutors at FAMU. In 1952 FAMU was given the Roxy Cinema, a former Jewish cinema at Dlouhá 33, which it used as a film studio from 1955. During the school's early years it faced numerous challenges, including a negative reception to its academic program from film-makers at Barrandov Studios, attempts to have the school closed, and political interference from the AMU Action Committee following the communist coup of 1948, which led to the expulsion of two students. Nonetheless, the school survived, and built an academic program based on the All-Union State Institute of Cinematography in Moscow.

Although the 1960s are considered to be FAMU's "golden period", during which many of the central figures of the Czechoslovak new wave were students at the school, including world-famous directors such as Miloš Forman, FAMU was also able to maintain a relatively free educational culture during the normalisation period, resisting attempts from the regime to focus the school's program on agitprop after the Warsaw Pact invasion in August 1968.

== Academics ==
FAMU forms one part of AMU, alongside the Theatre Faculty (DAMU) and the Music and Dance Faculty (HAMU). In 2011, the school had 112 faculty members and 350 students across bachelors, masters and doctoral programs, including 80 foreign students. As of 2014 the school had 450 students studying in Czech and 100 in English.

FAMU is composed of eleven departments: Directing, Documentary filmmaking, Scriptwriting and Dramaturgy, Animated Film, Cinematography, Sound Design, Editing, Production, Photography, and the FAMU Center for AudioVisual Studies, focusing on contemporary audiovision at the intersection between theory and practice. Studies are offered at the bachelors, masters and doctoral levels.

Most courses at the school are taught in Czech. However, certain courses are taught in English, including: the one-year Academy Preparation Program, an intensive course focused on theoretical as well as practical film instruction; the three-month Special Production Course, which focuses on the practical issues of production and distribution of audio-visual work; the three-year master's degree "Cinema in Digital Media", a course for foreign students focusing mainly on authorial script-writing and directing work, run by FAMU's International department; and summer workshops. The individual departments are gradually expanding their programmes to include instruction in English, which is currently offered by the departments of Photography and Cinematography. Students studying in English must pay tuition, while courses offered in Czech are for free.

== Facilities ==
FAMU's main building is located in the historic centre of Prague. The school includes Studio FAMU, a production and post-production facility with fully equipped sound stages and TV studios. Each autumn, FAMU organises a showcase of its students' work called the Famufest festival, with an accompanying cultural programme and visits by prominent figures in film-making.

== International affiliations ==
The faculty is a founding member of the CILECT network and also of the European League of Institutes of the Arts (ELIA). FAMU runs several short courses organised in cooperation with organisations such as the Council on International Educational Exchange (CIEE), CET Academic Programs and schools including New York University's Tisch School of the Arts, Emerson College, Syracuse University, Columbia University, Yale University, and CalArts.

== International rankings ==
The Hollywood Reporter has repeatedly named FAMU among the best schools in the world, including as the 7th in the world 2011, and 11th in the world in 2012, as well as the best school in Europe in both years. The magazine subsequently included FAMU in its annual lists of "Best International Film Schools" (outside the United States), placed 4th in 2014, and included in an unranked "top 15" list in 2017.

Famu was again included in an unranked top 15 list in the 2024 Hollywood Reporter ranking.

== Notable faculty ==
- Rudolf Adler (1941–)
- Jaroslav Balík (1924–1996)
- František Daniel (1926–1996) left in 1972
- Karel Kachyňa (1924–2004) left in 1972
- Václav Krška (1900–1969) head of film direction department
- Milan Kundera, (1929–2023) lecturer in literature (1954–69)
- Karel Plicka (1894–1977)
- Přemek Podlaha (1938–2014)
- Břetislav Pojar (1923–2012) left in 1972
- Jiří Sequens (1922–2008)
- Evald Schorm (1931–1988)
- Otakar Vávra (1911–2011) head of film direction department from 1957
- Václav Vorlíček (1930–2009)

== Notable alumni ==
- Frank Beyer (1932–2006), East German film director, studied theatre sciences and then film direction (1952–57)
- Věra Chytilová (1929–2014), Czech avant-garde film director, studied film production (1957–62)
- Karel Cudlín (born 1960), Czech photographer, studied at FAMU 1983-87
- Jasmin Dizdar (born 1961), studied film direction, graduated 1989
- Zoran Đorđević (born 1962), Serbian director, screenwriter, photographer and producer living in Brazil.
- Vilko Filač (1950–2008), Slovenian cinematographer of the Yugoslav Praška filmska škola
- Miloš Forman (1932–2018), Czech-American film director, studied screenwriting
- Rajko Grlić (born 1947), Yugoslav film director of the Yugoslav Praška filmska škola
- Agnieszka Holland (born 1948), Polish film director, graduated 1971
- Jan Hřebejk (born 1967), Czech film director, studied screenplay and script editing (1987–91)
- Juraj Jakubisko (born 1938), Slovak film director, studied film direction (1960–65)
- Petr Jarchovsky (born 1966), Czech screenwriter, studied screenplay and script editing (1987–91)
- Libuše Jarcovjáková (born 1952), Czech diaristic photographer, photographed the T-Club in Prague between 1983 and 1985
- Vojtěch Jasný (1925–2019), Czech film director
- Radek John (born 1954), Czech journalist and politician, studied screenwriting, graduated 1979
- Srđan Karanović (born 1945), Yugoslav film director of the Yugoslav Praška filmska škola
- Ralf Kirsten (1930–1998), German film director, studied film directing (1952–56)
- Milan Kundera (born 1929), Czech-French writer, studied film direction and script writing at FAMU
- Emir Kusturica (born 1954), Yugoslav film director of the Yugoslav Praška filmska škola
- Markéta Luskačová (born 1944), Czech photographer, studied photography
- Goran Marković (born 1946), Yugoslav film director of the Yugoslav Praška filmska škola
- Sulejman Medenčević (born 1963), Yugoslav film director, studied for a master's degree in cinematography
- Jiří Menzel (1938–2020), Czech film director
- Jan Němec (1936–2016), Czech film director
- Goran Paskaljević (born 1947), Yugoslav film director of the Yugoslav Praška filmska škola
- Ivan Passer (1933–2020), Czech-American film director and screenwriter
- Sacha Pecaric (born 1965), Croatian rabbi, studied artistic photography (1985–91)
- Konrad Petzold (1930–1999), German film director
- Filip Remunda (born 1973), Czech documentary film-maker, graduated from the Department of Documentary Film in 2005
- Grigorij Richters (born 1987), German film director and activist, studied film direction (2006-2007)
- Evald Schorm (1931–1988), Czech film director, studied film direction (1956–63)
- Norika Sefa, Kosovan film director, writer and editor
- Karol Sidon (born 1942), Czech playwright and rabbi, studied dramaturgy and screenwriting (1960–64)
- Vladimír Škutina (1931–1995), Czech writer, playwright, journalist, screenwriter, and television producer
- Tono Stano (born 1960), Slovak art photographer, studied art photography (1980–86)
- Jan Svěrák (born 1965), Czech film director, studied documentary film
- Petr Šálek (born 1948), Czech photographer
- Woody Vasulka (1937–2019), studied television and film production
- Václav Vorlíček (1930–2019), Czech film director, studied filmmaking (1951–56)
- Lordan Zafranović (born 1944), Yugoslav film director of the Yugoslav Praška filmska škola
- Jan Zajíček (born 1977), Czech film-director
- Živko Zalar (born 1948), Yugoslav cinematographer of the Yugoslav Praška filmska škola
- Petr Zelenka (born 1967), Czech theatre and film director, studied screenwriting
