= The Prague film school =

Eastern European film school, late 20th century

The Prague film school (Serbo-Croatian: Praška filmska škola, Прашка филмска школа), also known as the Czech film school (Serbo-Croatian: Češka filmska škola, Чешка филмска школа) or the Prague wave (Serbo-Croatian: Praški talas, Прашки талас) was a group of Yugoslav film directors who rose to prominence in the 1970s after graduating from the Film and TV School of the Academy of Performing Arts in Prague (FAMU). Five prominent Yugoslav directors born from 1944 to 1947 attended classes at FAMU: Lordan Zafranović (b. 1944), Srđan Karanović (b. 1945), Goran Marković (b. 1946), Goran Paskaljević (1947-2020), and Rajko Grlić (b. 1947). Emir Kusturica, who was born in 1954, is sometimes also considered a member of the Praška škola. Cinematographers Živko Zalar (who has worked with Grlić, Karanović and Marković), Predrag Pega Popović (who has worked with Zafranović and Marković), Vilko Filač (who has worked with Kusturica), Valentin Perko, and Pavel Grzinčič, also studied at FAMU, as did editor Andrija Zafranović, who worked with Kusturica and his brother Lordan Zafranović.

As they were all FAMU students at the end of 1960s and the beginning of 1970s, the directors of the Praška škola were mostly influenced by the directors of Czechoslovak New Wave, such as Miloš Forman, Jiří Menzel, and Oscar-winning FAMU professors, Ján Kadár and Elmar Klos. The events of the Prague Spring and Warsaw Pact invasion of Czechoslovakia in 1968 also strongly influenced the Praška škola and formed the basis for the loosely defined group.

== History ==
The beginning of the emergence of the Praška škola came in 1968, when Grlić, as a student, directed his first professional television documentary entitled Mi iz Praga (We from Prague). The film, produced by TV Zagreb, focused on the interactions between the Yugoslav students in Prague. In this film, Marković states that Karanović and he were the first to enroll in FAMU, prompting the others to follow in their steps. The first feature film directed by a Praška škola member was Zafranović's Sunday (Serbo-Croatian: Nedjelja) (1969), starring Goran Marković, followed by Karanović's Društvena igra (1972) and Grlić's Whichever Way the Ball Bounces (Serbo-Croatian: Kud puklo da puklo) (1974), which were praised by the modernism-influenced film critics, but not yet universally accepted by the wider Yugoslav audience.

However, the second half of the 1970s brought fame to the members of the group, and the term Praška škola was coined by critics after the success of its members at several Yugoslav and international film festivals. In 1976, the TV series Grlom u jagode, written by Grlić and Karanović and directed by Karanović, was highly successful in Yugoslavia. The same year, Paskaljević received the Golden Arena for Best Director award at the Pula Film Festival for his first feature film Beach Guard in Winter (Serbo-Croatian: Čuvar plaže u zimskom periodu). In 1977, Marković's debut film Special Education (Serbo-Croatian: Specijalno vaspitanje) won the FIPRESCI award at the International Filmfestival Mannheim-Heidelberg. In 1978, all four main prizes at the Pula Film Festival were awarded to films directed by former FAMU students: Zafranović's Occupation in 26 Pictures (Serbo-Croatian: Okupacija u 26 slika), Grlić's Bravo maestro, Paskaljević's The Dog Who Loved Trains (Serbo-Croatian: Pas koji je volio vozove), and Karanović's Miris poljskog cveća, for which Živko Zalar was also awarded the Golden Arena for Best Cinematography.

Throughout the 1980s, the term Praška škola was associated with many successful films, popular with critics, as well as the general public. Seven out of ten Golden Arena for Best Director awards from 1976 to 1986 went to the Praška škola, with each member except for Marković receiving at least one. The success of two-time Palme d'Or winner Emir Kusturica, who attended FAMU several years after the other members of the Praška škola, further boosted the academy's reputation in field of Yugoslav cinema.

== Recognition and criticism of the term ==
The legitimacy of the term Praška škola is sometimes doubted, as the members themselves never used the term to describe their work, and their work varied in artistic sensibility and directorial approach, sometimes considerably. In 1990, Marković wrote a book entitled Češka škola ne postoji (The Czech School Doesn't Exist), in which he describes his days at FAMU, his relationships with the other students and their artistic similarities and differences. In a 2001 interview, Karanović expressed strong opposition to the term, saying:

"I think that everyone got extremely bored of the term Praška škola quite a while ago. I cannot deny that I studied in Prague, that I learned a lot — yet, not everything — there, and that I made lasting friendships with my colleagues from former Yugoslavia who studied there at the same time. Yet, I reckon that we are all very different artists and only in some of our films can one find some hints of influence from 1960s Czech cinematography. I appreciate the films by Rajko Grlić, Goran Marković, Goran Paskaljević, Lordan Zafranović and Emir Kusturica very much, but I think that all of them deserve to be observed individually, and not as a part of this or any other group."

However, retrospectives of the Praška škola were held in Belgrade in 2001, and in Zagreb in 2014, when all the initial Praška škola members, except for Karanović, met and reminisced about their Prague years. In August 2014, Zafranović, Marković, Paskaljević and Grlić announced they would be filming together for the first time. Grlić and Marković said that an anthology film with the working title Nirvana was to be filmed in the memory of their professor Elmar Klos. However, this film never came to fruition. In September 2018, a program dedicated to the Praška škola entitled Mi iz Praga 1968.-2018. was held in Rijeka, and Paskaljević, Karanović, Zafranović and Grlić joined a panel discussion.

As of July 2024, all the founding members of Praška škola are still alive and active, except for Goran Paskaljević, who died on 25 September 2020.

== Gallery ==
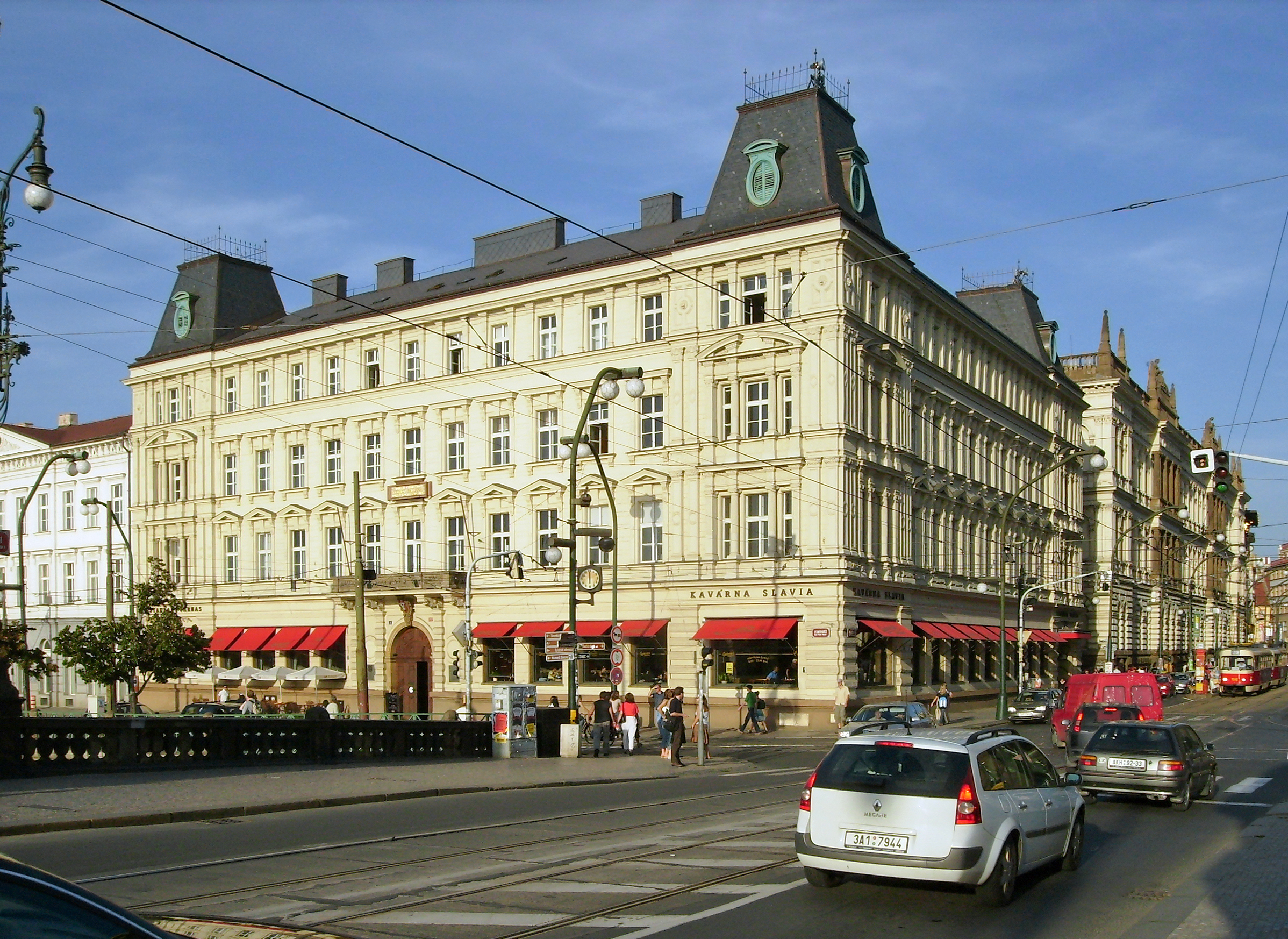
Film and TV School of the Academy of Performing Arts in Prague (FAMU)

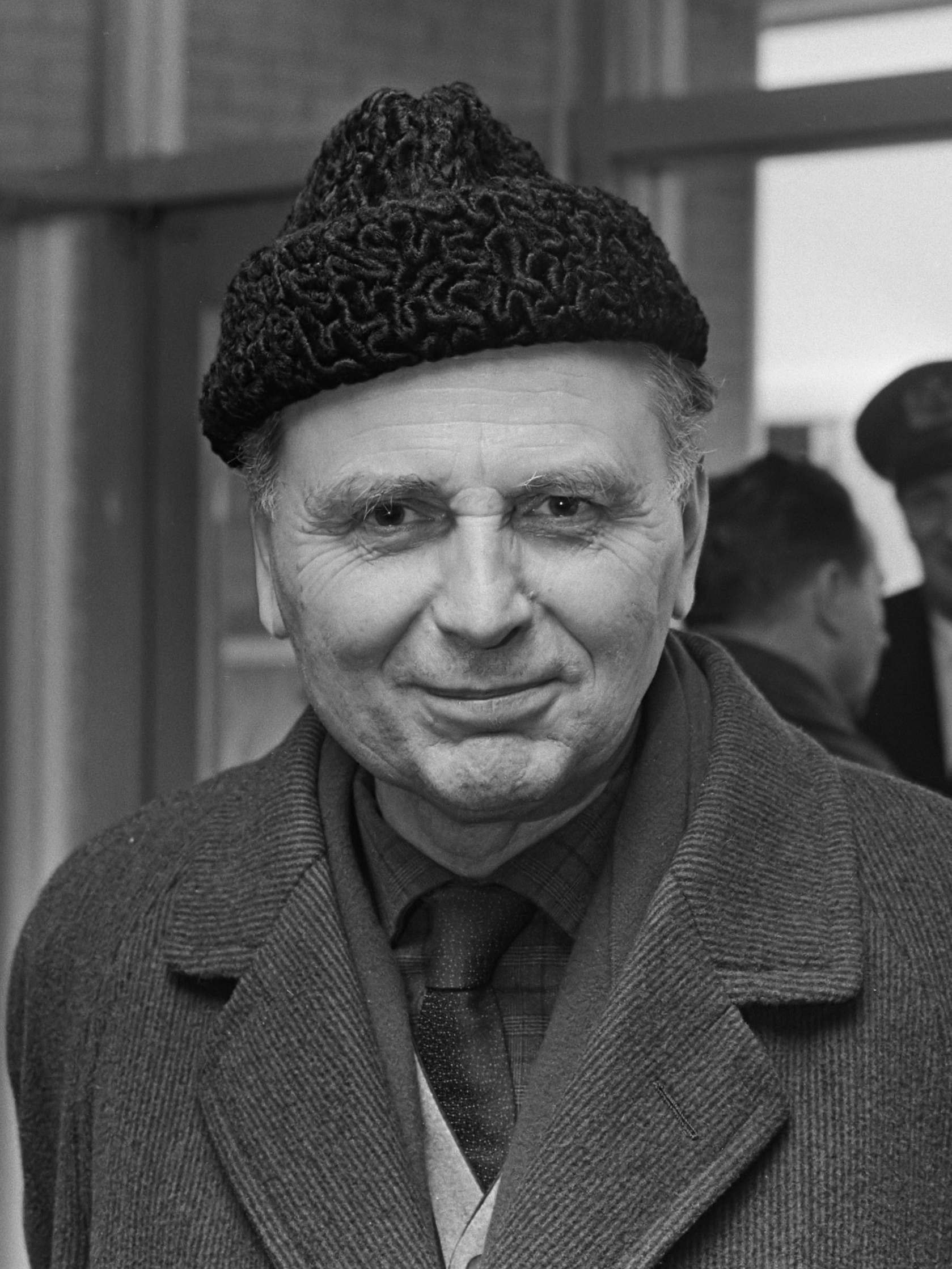
FAMU professor Elmar Klos

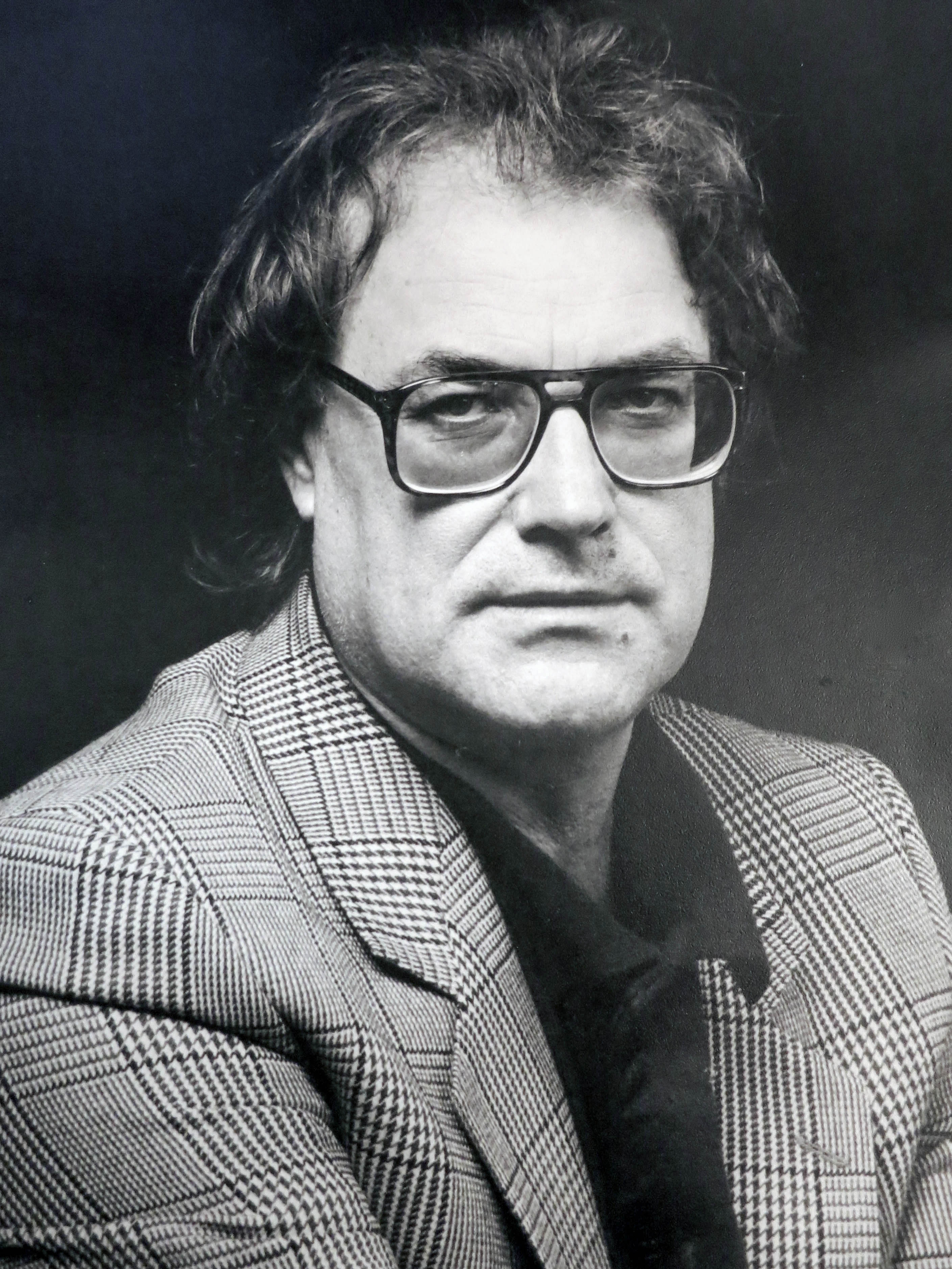
Lordan Zafranović

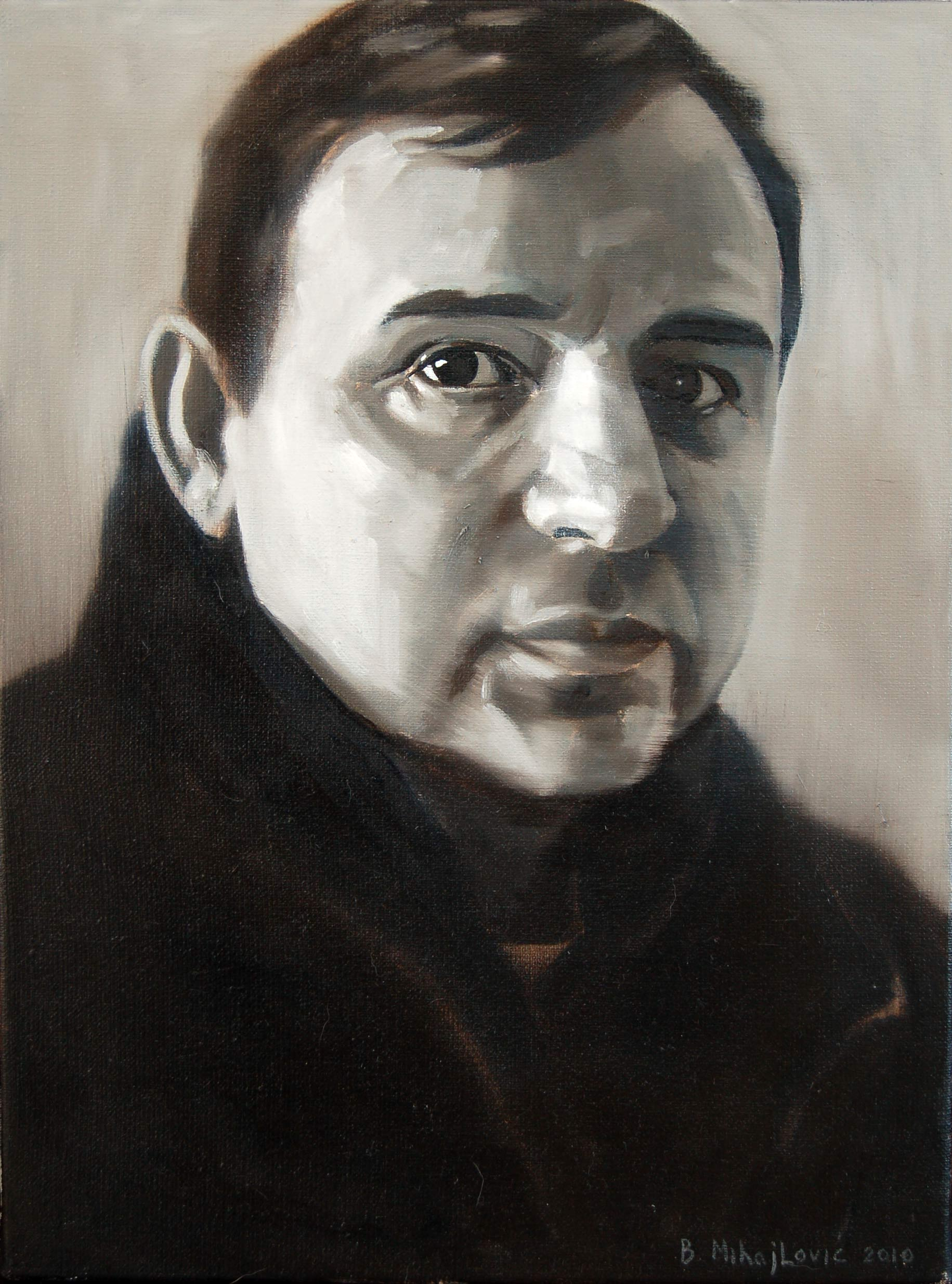
Goran Marković

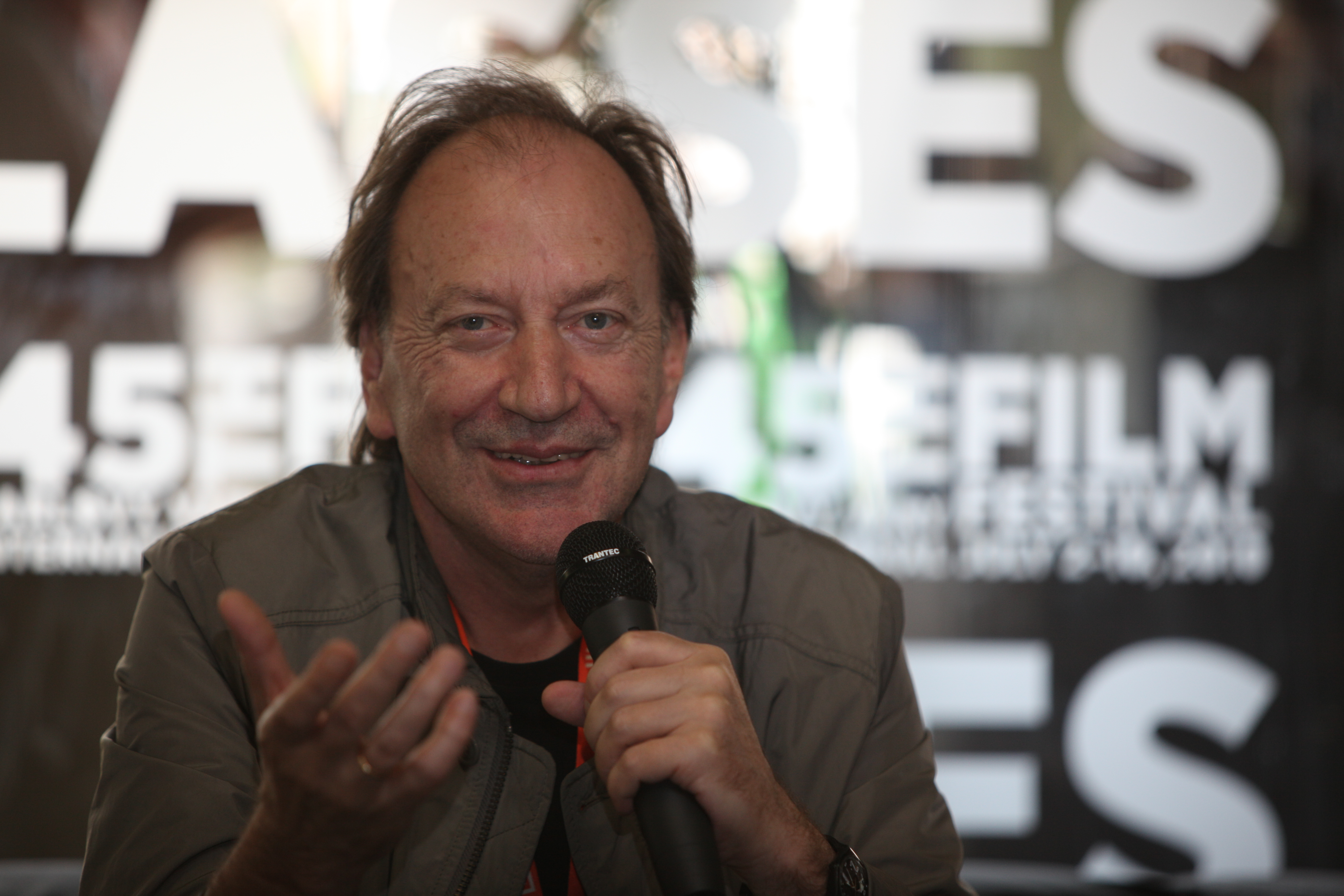
Goran Paskaljević

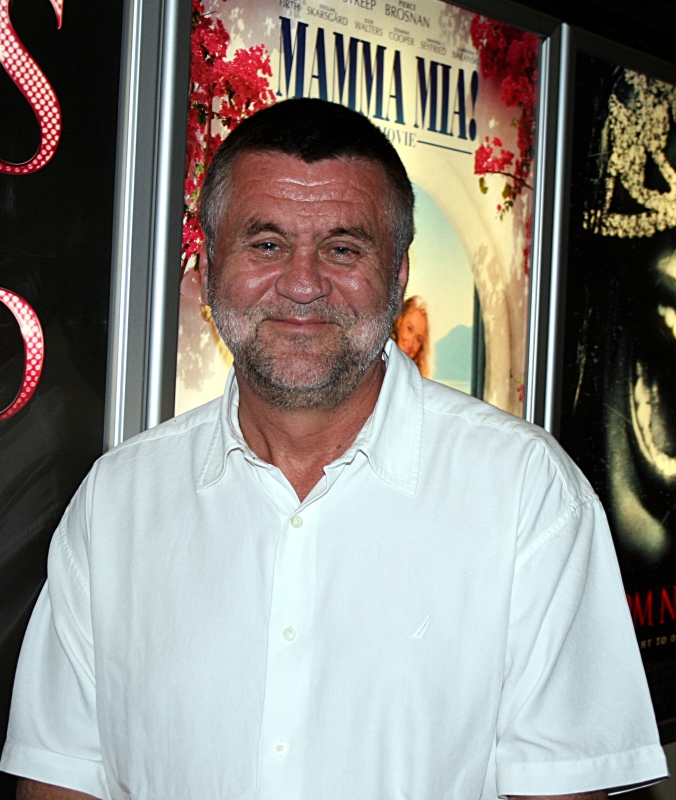
Rajko Grlić

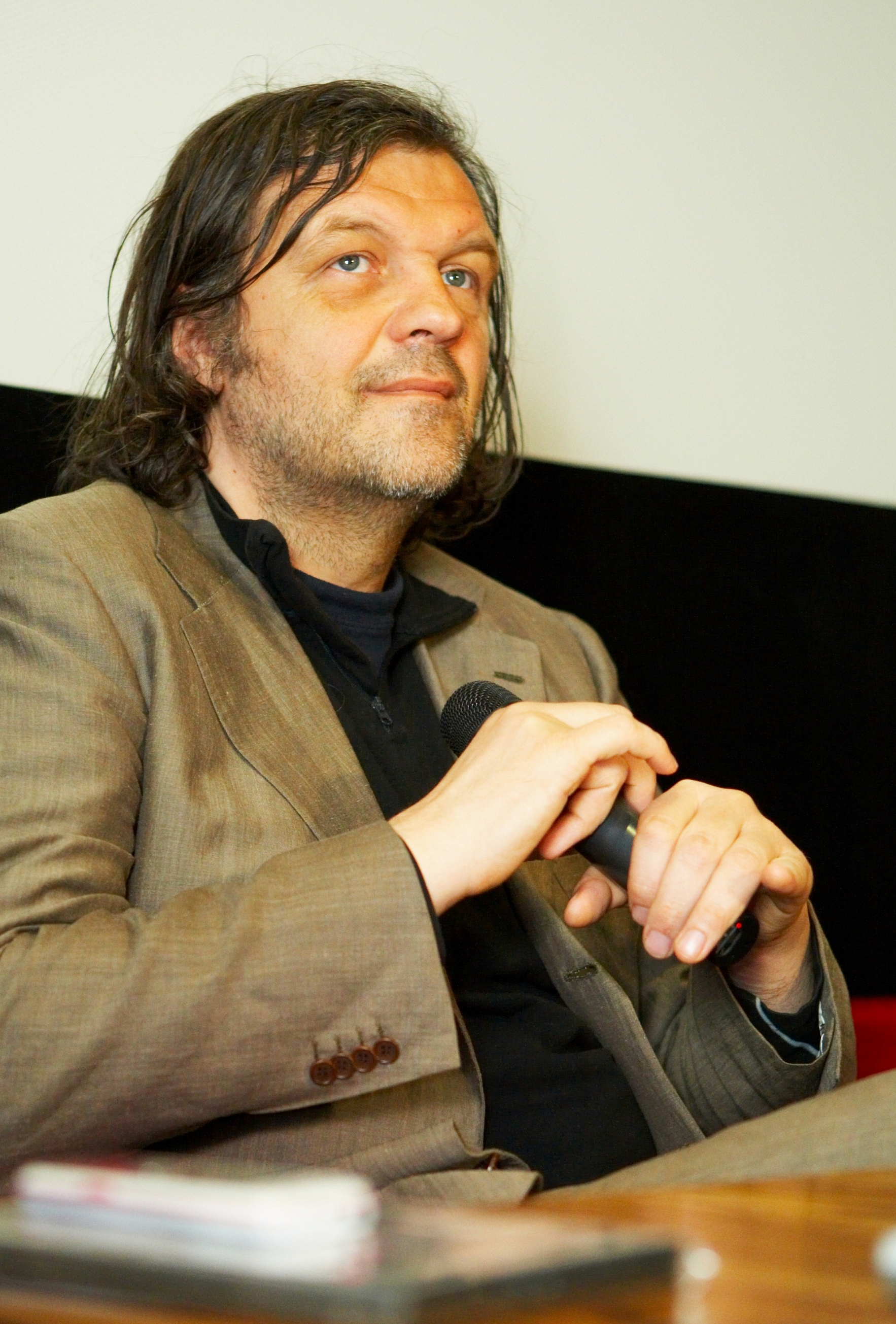
Emir Kusturica

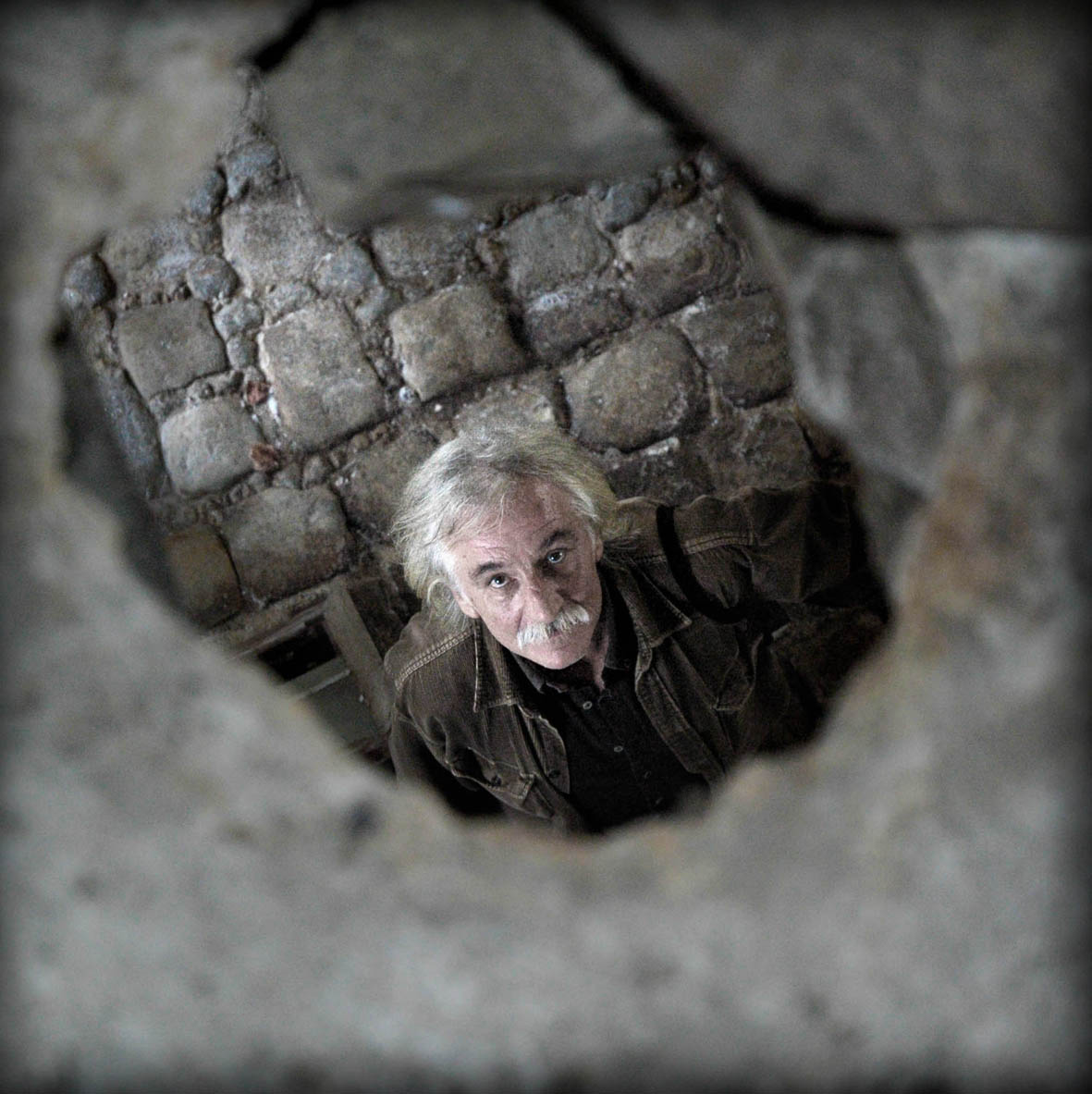
Vilko Filač

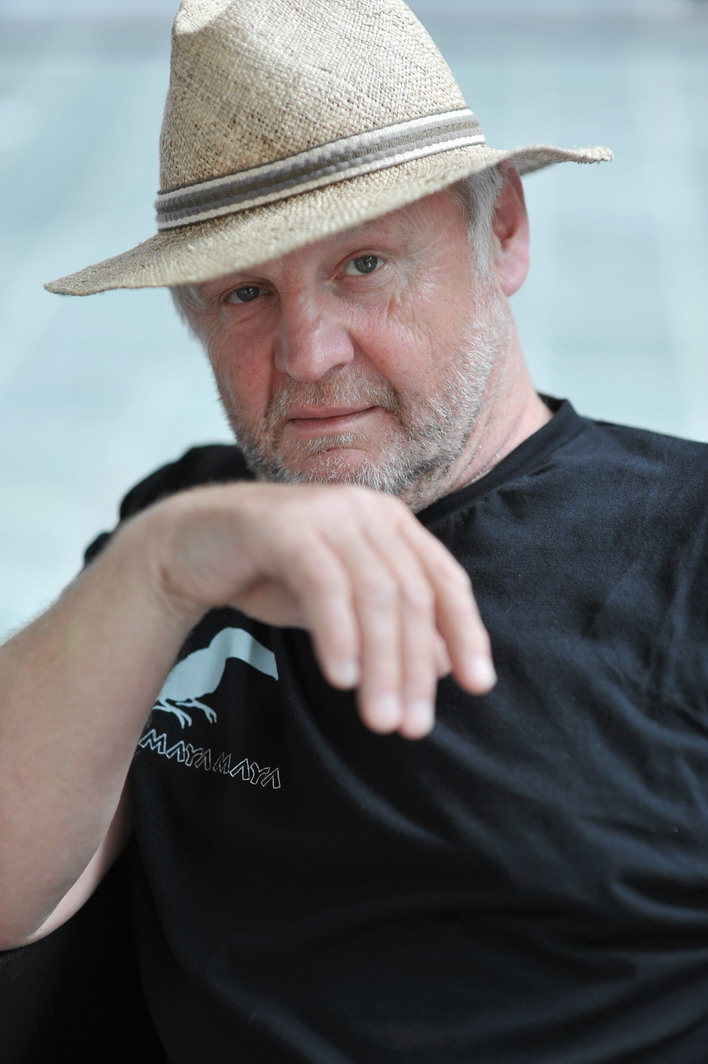
Valentin Perko
