= Someone Else's America =

1995 film

- Directed by: Goran Paskaljević
- Starring: Tom Conti; Miki Manojlović
- Release date: April 19, 1995
- Running time: 96 minutes
- Country: Yugoslavia / UK / France / Germany / Greece
- Language: Serbian / English

Someone Else's America (Serbian Cyrillic: Туђа Америка) is a 1995 drama film directed by Goran Paskaljević.

The film presents the story of two people, one from Spain, the other from Montenegro, both living in Brooklyn.

The film won the Golden Spike at the Valladolid International Film Festival in 1995.

== Cast ==
- Tom Conti - Alonso
- Miki Manojlović - Bayo
- María Casares - Alonso's Mother
- Zorka Manojlović - Bayo's Mother
- Sergej Trifunović - Lukas
- José Ramón Rosario - Panchito
