= Stefan Vladar =

Austrian pianist and conductor (born c. 1965)

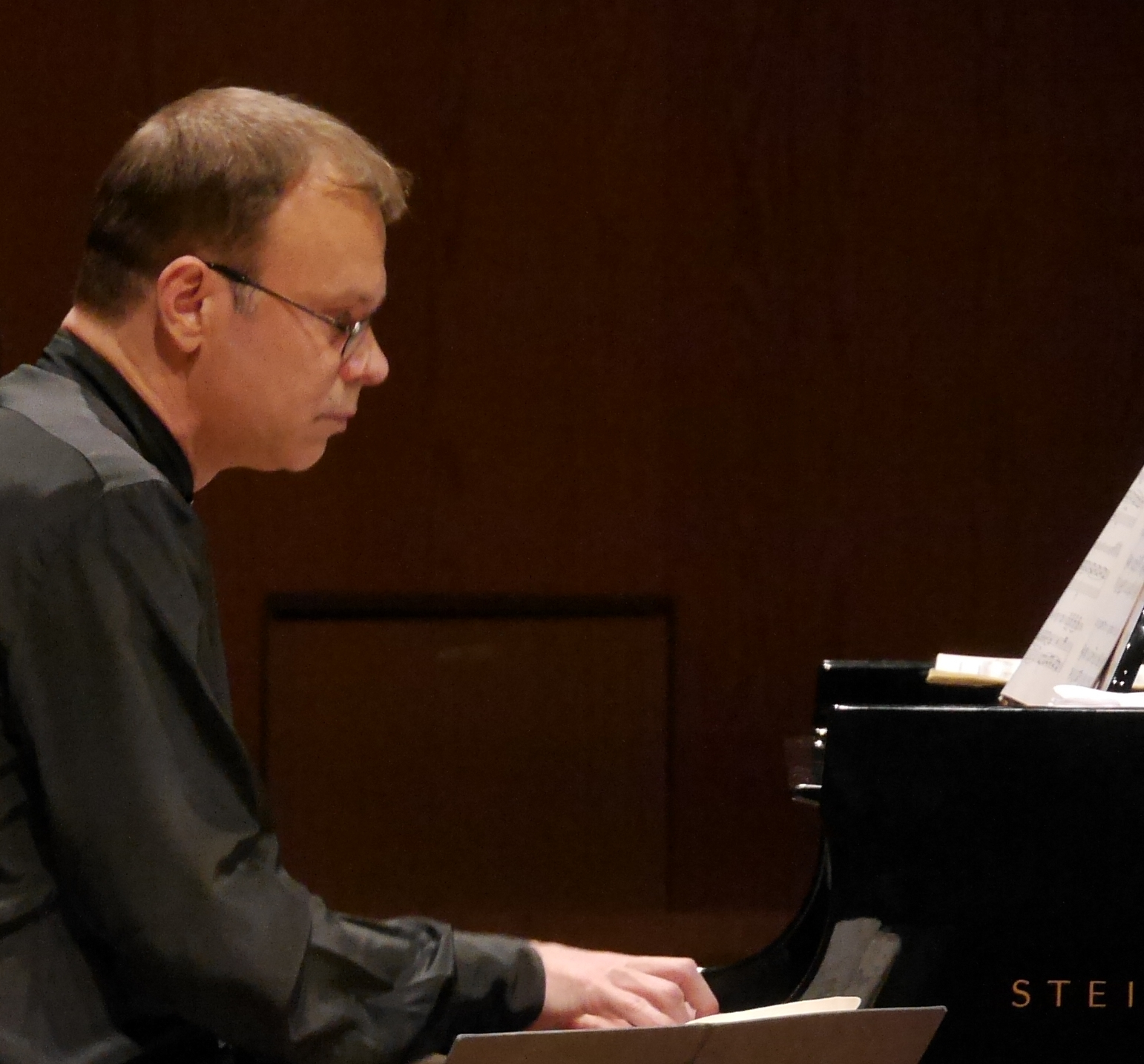
Stefan Vladar

Stefan Vladar (born in Vienna, 1965) is an Austrian pianist and conductor.

== Biography ==
Stefan began piano lessons at the age of six, and in 1973 he began studies at the Vienna University for Music and Arts; Renate Kramer-Preisenhammer and Hans Petermandl were two of his teachers.

In 1985 Vladar won Vienna's VII Ludwig van Beethoven piano competition. In 1992 he participated in My War Years, a Canadian docudrama about Arnold Schoenberg and this composer's way to atonality. Vladar was awarded the Mozartinterpretationspreis of the Mozartgemeinde Wien in 1994. In addition to his concert career he's been the Grosses Orchester Graz principal conductor since 2002 and since 2008 principal conductor of the Vienna Chamber Orchestra.
