= Vienna Chamber Orchestra =

Austrian chamber orchestra

- Orchestra
- Founded: 1946
- Concert hall: Konzerthaus
- Principal conductor: Jan Willem de Vriend
- Website: www.kammerorchester.com/en/concerts

The Vienna Chamber Orchestra (Wiener Kammer Orchester, or WKO) is an Austrian chamber orchestra based at the Vienna Konzerthaus.

== History ==
The WKO was founded in 1946, and its first artistic directors were Franz Litschauer, Heinrich Hollreiser, Paul Angerer, and Carlo Zecchi. When he took over the position from 1976 to 1991, Philippe Entremont started a tradition of conductors playing a dual rôle, appearing as both conductor and soloist. Entremont has continued as the Orchestra's lifetime honorary conductor, leading it on tour and in its matinée subscription series at the Konzerthaus. In addition, the WKO has continued to invite dual-role artists, including Yehudi Menuhin, Heinz Holliger, Heinrich Schiff, and Ola Rudner.

Heinrich Schiff was chief conductor of the WKO from 2005 to 2008, when he stepped down from the post for health reasons. Stefan Vladar was the most recent chief conductor of the WKO, from 2008 to 2018. Since 2018, the WKO's principal guest conductor is Joji Hattori.

The commercial recordings of the WKO include the first complete recording of the symphonies of Joseph Haydn, conducted by Ernst Märzendorfer. This set received a very limited release and was little known at the time.

== Chief conductors ==
- Franz Litschauer
- Heinrich Hollreiser
- Paul Angerer (1956–1963)
- Carlo Zecchi (1966–1976)
- Philippe Entremont (1976–1991)
- Ernst Kovacic (artistic leader, 1996–1998)
- Christoph Eberle (1999–2004)
- Heinrich Schiff (2005–2008)
- Stefan Vladar (2008–2018)
- Jan Willem de Vriend (designate, effective 2023)

== See also ==
- Vienna Philharmonic Orchestra
- Vienna Symphony Orchestra
