= Petr Šálek =

Czech photographer (born 1948)

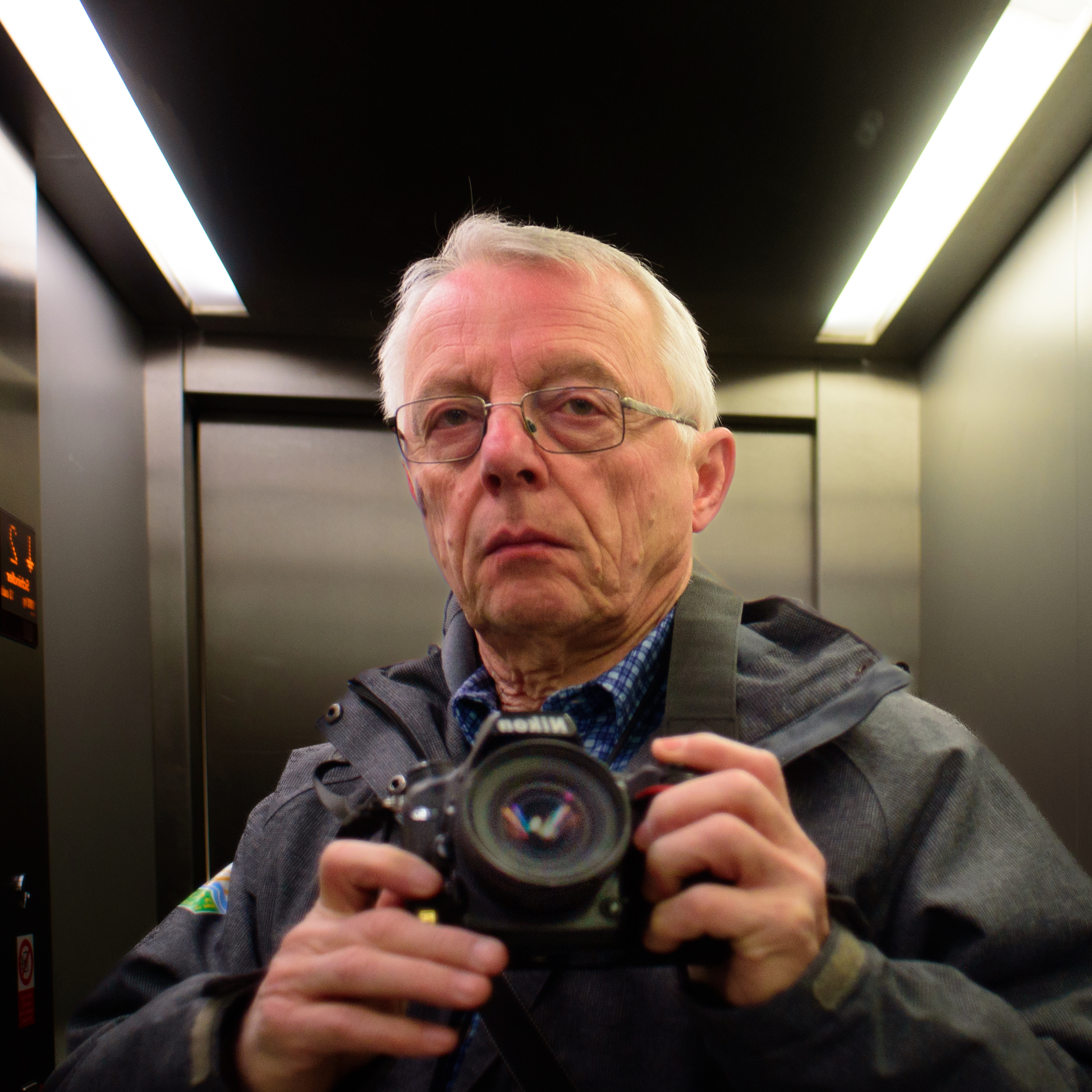
- Petr Šálek in 2025
- Born: 19 July 1948 (age 78); Prague, Czechoslovakia
- Occupation: Photographer

Petr Šálek, MFA, QEP (born 19 July 1948) is a Czech photographer. He is mostly known for work in commercial and fashion photography, but also produces work as an experimental photographer. He does panoramic photography and high pigment quality printing. Wide-angle photography, composition, lighting and geometric landscape are Šálek's signature features.

== Biography ==
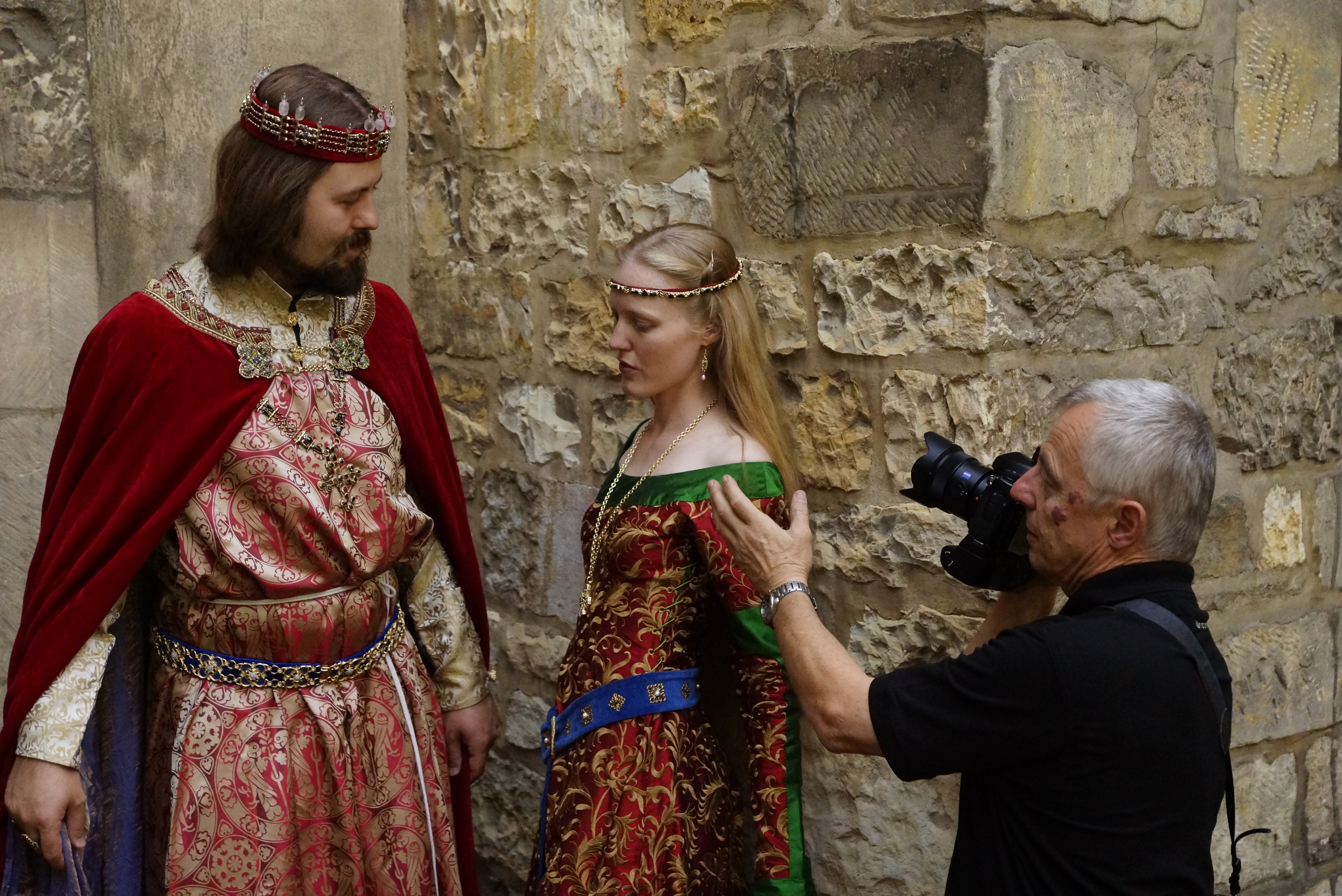
Petr Šálek at work

Šálek was born on born 19 July 1948 in Prague, Czechoslovakia. He studied at the Film and TV School of the Academy of Performing Arts in Prague, in the Department of Art Photography. He left Czechoslovakia in 1981, during the normalization period, returning after the Velvet Revolution. His work has been published in several photo books and magazines and exhibited in several prominent venues. He was awarded the 2002 title of Qualified European Photographer in the category of Advertising Photography in Orvieto on 16 March 2002.

== Select solo exhibitions ==
- 1996 Young Fashion - Künstlerfest, Erlangen, Germany
- 1996 Water Folly – Blumen & Art, Nuremberg, Germany
- 1996 Avantgarde – Ward-Nasse Gallery, New York, US
- 1996 Flowers – Blumen & Art, Nuremberg, Germany
- 1997 Technikum – Schwan Stabilo, Heroldsberg, Germany
- 1997 Digital Photographs – Motor-Presse-Verlag, Stuttgart, Germany
- 1997 Photographs – Funkhaus, Nuremberg, Germany
- 1998 Photographs – Cebit, Hanover, Germany
- 1998 Views – picture gallery OBI, Nuremberg, Germany
- 1998 World of Photography – representation of Epson company, Vienna, Austria
- 1999 Enwrap (photographs in collaboration with the German choreographer Felix Ruckert) – club Solidní nejistota, Prague
- 2000 Prague – European City of Culture – exhibition accompanying the performances of the company Dance Perfekt in partner
- 2000 European cities of culture - Brussels, Bologna, Reykjavík, Avignon, Helsinki
- 2000 Jak se kalí grafie (How Calli Graphs, collaboration with Petr Geisler) - National Gallery in Prague, Zbraslav Chateau
- 2001 Animal Dancing – Studio Fénix, Prague
- 2002 Photo Calligraphy (combination of photographs with calligraphy by Petr Geisler) club Solidní nejistota, Prague
- 2002 Blind Alley – Studio Fénix, Prague
- 2002 Qualified European Photographer – National Museum of Photography, Jindřichův Hradec
- 2003 Crooks 1 – International Exhibition Interkamera, Prague Exhibition Grounds
- 2004 Photo Calligraphy 2 – Mironet Company, Prague
- 2004 Crooks 2 – club Solidní nejistota, Prague
- 2004 Photo Calligraphy 3 – Digiforum, Prague
- 2004 Crooks 3 – Allegro Gallery, Prague
- 2005 Mud on Canvas – International Exhibition Interkamera, Prague Exhibition Grounds
- 2006 Prague XXL – Old Town City Hall of Prague
- 2008 Prague Panoramic – Buenos Aires
- 2008 Praguefoto – Prague
- 2009 Airport Praha-Ruzyně, City of Prague, Presentation on Occasion of the EU-Chairmanship of Czech Republic (Co-Author Graphic Designer Pavel Dufek)
- 2009 Foto Calligraphy – Cafe Kino Lucerna, Prague
- 2009 Water Games - Famood, Prague
- 2010 1984 – (Variations on George Orwell´s book), Hotel Clarion, Prague
- 2011 1984-2 – Cafe Technika, Prague
- 2011 Prague Panoramic – Hotel Leonardo, Prague
- 2011 1984-3 – DOX, Prague
- 2012 Prague Panoramic – New Town Hall, Prague
- 2012 Railway Bridge – Cafe Kofein, Prague, in cooperation with Pavel Dufek
- 2012 Railway Bridge 2 – Winehouse Voršilka, Prague, in cooperation with Pavel Dufek
- 2014 Photo Calligraphy (combination of photographs with calligraphy by Petr Geisler) - Prostor, Prague
- 2015 Where is my home, where is my home? – Prostor, Prague, in cooperation with Pavel Dufek
- 2015 1984, The National Library, Pristina, Kosovo
- 2016 Prague Panoramic, The National Library, Pristina, Kosovo
- 2017 Prague Panoramic, Permanent Mission of the Czech Republic to the United Nations, New York
- 2018 Praha Panoramic, Kabul, Embassy of the Czech Republic
- 2022 Where is my home?, Roesel - beer & food, Prague, in cooperation with Pavel Dufek
- 2022 Where is my home II?, Hostel Brix, Prague, in cooperation with Pavel Dufek
- 2023 Funny Food, Vinárna u sv. Anežky, Prague

== Included in collections ==
- National Museum of Photography, Jindřichův Hradec
- Gold Collection of gifts from contemporary Czech photographers
- National Library of the Czech Republic
- Museum of Decorative Arts in Prague

== Books ==
- Československá fotografie v exilu (1939–1989), Prague, 1992, Anna Fárová, Catalogue
- Die neue Akt Fotoschule, 2000, VERLAG PHOTOGRAPHIE, ISBN 3-933131-00-6,
- Reklama 1990–1999, 2000, Asociace fotografů, ISBN 80-902629-2-9
- Asociace fotografů České republiky se představuje: Petr Šálek, FotoVideo 2001, vol. 11
- Česká fotografie 20. století, Prague, 2005, Vladimír Birgus, Jan Mlčoch, UPM, KANT, ISBN 80-86217-89-2
- 1984, Prague: Petr Šálek, 2011, Graphic Design by Pavel Dufek, ISBN 978-80-254-9180-5
- Praha XXL = Prague XXL; Tělo = Body, Catalogue of the Exhibition at the Old Town Hall, Prague: Petr Šálek, 2005, ISBN 80-239-6487-9
- Jeden den České republiky, (One day in the life of Czech Republic) Editor: Pavel Radosta, 2007, ISBN 978-80-254-0496-6, pp. 156–157
- PRAGUE, Petr Šálek, 2016, Graphic Design by Pavel Dufek, ISBN 978-80-260-9910-9
