= Barbara Moser =

Austrian classical pianist

Barbara N. Moser (born 1970) is an Austrian concert pianist.

== Life ==
Born in Vienna, one of the youngest students at the University of Music and Performing Arts Vienna at the age of five, she received her training with Heinz Medjimorec and subsequently with Greta Kraus in Toronto, Boris Bloch in Essen and Oleg Maisenberg, Roland Keller and Rudolf Buchbinder in Vienna.

In addition to her activities as a soloist and guest of well-known orchestras under renowned conductors, Moser devotes herself to chamber music, often performing with members of the Vienna Philharmonic. She is also interested in working with singers, and has accompanied Annette Dasch, Natalie Dessay, Mara Zampieri, Placido Domingo, Adrian Eröd, Wolfgang Holzmair, Anton Scharinger, Michael Schade, Mathias Zachariassen and the Arnold Schoenberg Choir among others.

She has conducted seminars on outstanding composers at the European Forum Alpbach and the Haydn Festspiele, she gives master classes, acts as a juror at competitions and habilitated at the Vienna Music University in 2006. As support for her doctoral studies, completed in 2007, and the publication of her dissertation "Vincenzo Bellinis opera La sonnambula - Verzierverhalten und allgemeine Aufführungspraxis auf Tonträgern sowie in älteren Quellen", she received scholarships from the "Emanuel und Sofie Fohn-Stipendienstiftung" and a "Best Publication Award 2010" from the University of Music Vienna, to which she was appointed professor of piano in March 2012. Since June 2018 she has been president of the Mozartgemeinde Wien.

A number of CD recordings attest to her versatility.

In 2005, she received the Wiener Flötenuhr.
