= Zoran Đorđević (director) =

- Зоран Ђорђевић
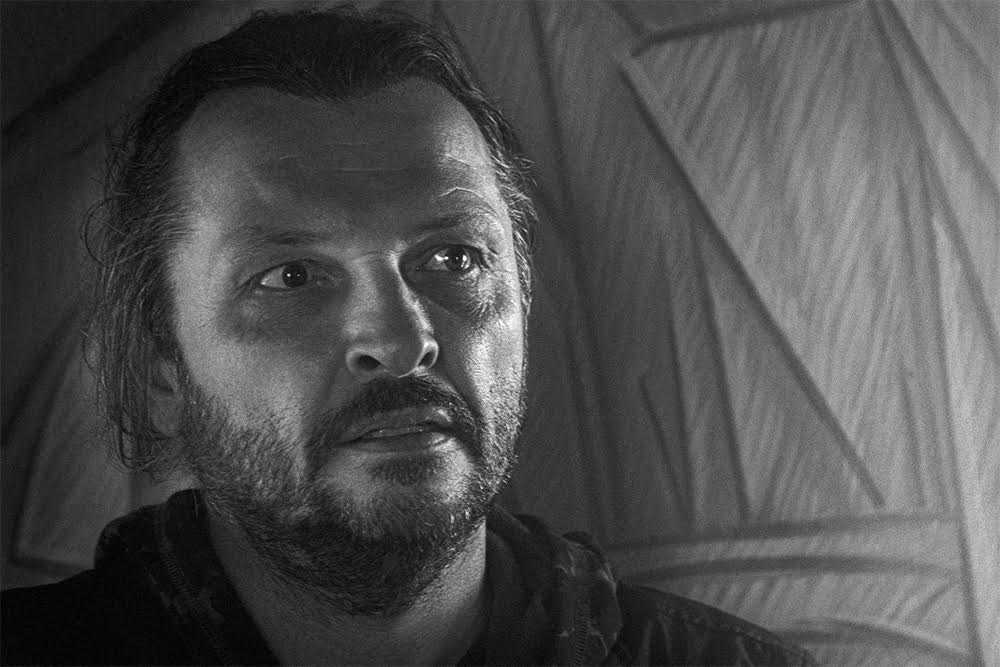
- Đorđević in 2017
- Born: 7 November 1962 (age 63); Valjevo, PR Serbia, FPR Yugoslavia
- Education: Film and TV School of the Academy of Performing Arts in Prague (1992)
- Occupations: Film and theater director, screenwriter, photographer, producer
- Years active: 1987–present

Zoran Đorđević (Serbian Cyrillic: Зоран Ђорђевић; born 7 November 1962) is a film, television and theater director, screenwriter, art photographer and producer.

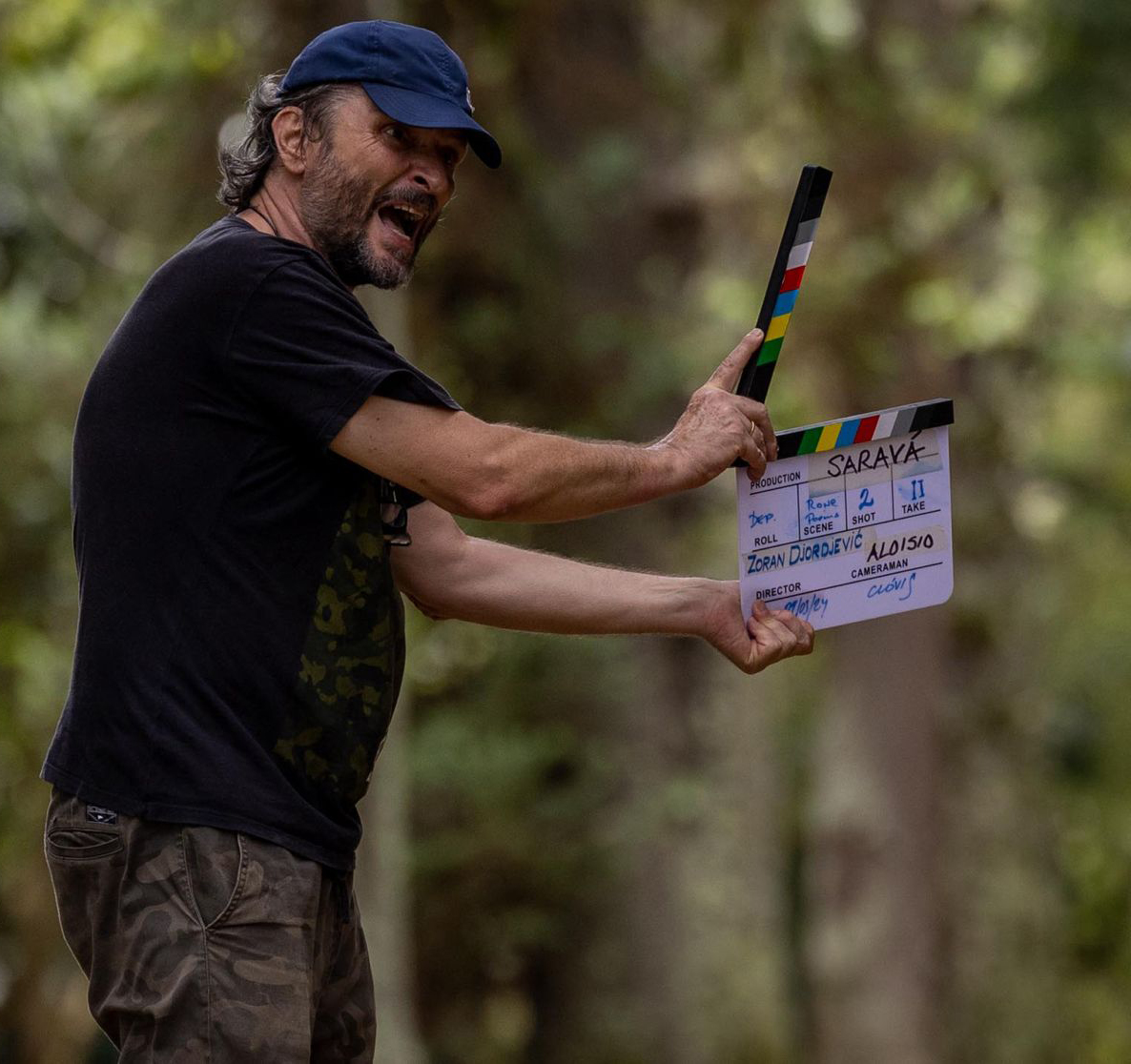

== Biography ==
Đorđević was born on 7 November 1962 in Valjevo, SR Serbia, Yugoslavia. Đorđević graduated from the Documentary Film department at FAMU, Film and TV School of the Academy of Arts in Prague.

Đorđević has made more than twenty films in Yugoslavia, Serbia, Czech Republic, Brazil, Angola, and other countries. Among other things, he is a laureate of the Yugoslav Documentary and Short Film Festival (today's Martovski festival) for the films Prayer for Dead Souls, Odyssey, and Cheers.

From the second half of the 1990s, Đorđević lived and worked mostly in Brazil, where his films are regularly shown at festivals.

In addition to film and theater making, he is also engaged with film and photographic pedagogy - at lectures for the Film Foundation in São José dos Campos, as well as other workshops and courses.

== Selected filmography ==
- 2024 Marcos, Força de vontade / Willpower
- 2022 Autorretrato com Marcos Santos
- 2021 Muros da vida
- 2017 Na gota colorida encontra-se uma vida
- 2013 O Saber e Fazer
- 2011 Memórias Caiçaras
- 2007 Nkisi na Diáspora: Raízes Religiosas Bantu no Brasil
- 2000 Ilhados
- 2000 Por Quem Os Sinos Dobram
- 1999 Živeli
- 1997 Dan kad smo svi gledali u nebo / O dia em que olhamos para o céu
- 1995 Odiseja
- 1995 Nostalgični koncert za violinu
- 1993 Molitva za mrtve duše
- 1992 Nestao
- 1987 Pozdravi sve koji pitaju za mene

== Selected theatrography ==
- 1999 The Wizard of Oz (Čarobnjak iz Oza), Valjevo
- 1987 An island story (Ostrvska priča), Valjevo
