= Goran Paskaljević =

Serbian film director and screenwriter (1947–2020)

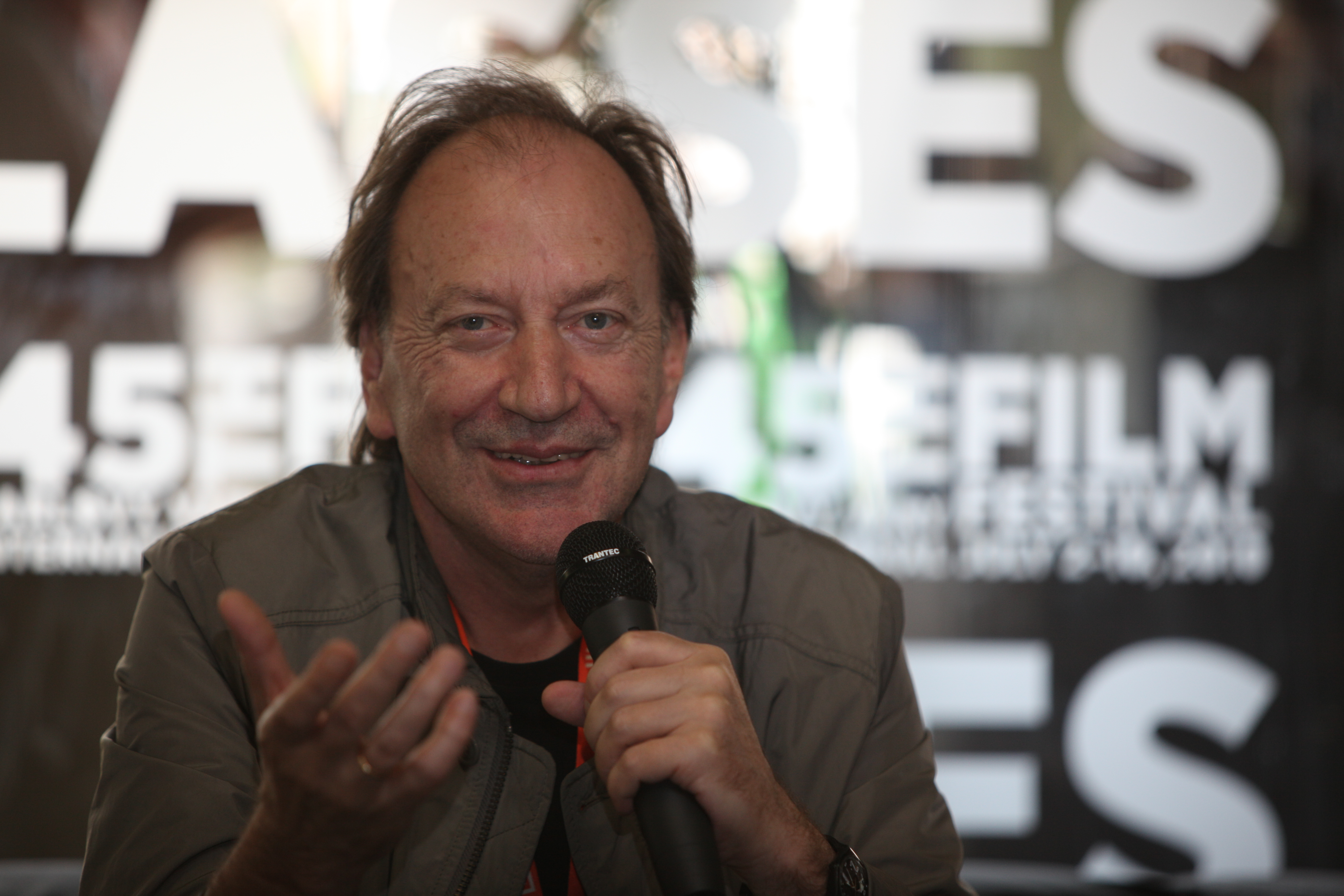
- Goran Paskaljević in July 2010 at the Karlovy Vary International Film Festival
- Born: 22 April 1947; Belgrade, PR Serbia, Yugoslavia
- Died: 25 September 2020 (aged 73); Paris, France
- Occupations: Film director, screenwriter and producer
- Years active: 1969–2020
- Spouse: Christine Gentet (m.1995)
- Children: Vladimir Paskaljević (b.1974) Petar Paskaljević (b.1993)
- Awards: Berlin Golden Bear for Best Film; Nominated 1976 Beach Guard in Winter; Nominated1978 The Dog Who Loved Trains; Cannes Palme d'Or; Nominated 1985 Special Treatment; Venice Golden Lion for Best Film; Nominated 2001 How Harry Became a Tree; Festróia Golden Dolphin for Best Film; Nominated 2002 How Harry Became a Tree; San Sebastián Golden Shell for Best Film; Nominated 2004 Midwinter Night's Dream; Valladolid Golden Spike for Best Film; 1995 Someone Else's America; 2006 The Optimists; Pula Golden Arena for Best Director; 1976 Beach Guard in Winter; 1980 Special Treatment

Goran Paskaljević (Serbian Cyrillic: Горан Паскаљевић; Serbo-Croatian: [ɡɔ̌ran paskǎːʎɛvit͡ɕ]; 22 April 1947 – 25 September 2020) was a Serbian and former Yugoslav film director.

== Biography ==
Born in Belgrade, he was raised by his grandparents in Niš in southern Serbia, following the divorce of his parents. Fourteen years later he returned to Belgrade where he worked with his stepfather at the Yugoslav Film Archive.

Paskaljević belonged to a group of several Yugoslav filmmakers who studied abroad and graduated from the prestigious Film and TV School of the Academy of Performing Arts in Prague (FAMU). After returning to Yugoslavia, he made some 30 documentaries and 16 feature films which were screened at many international film festivals (such as Cannes, Berlin, Venice, Toronto and San Sebastian) and met with critical acclaim. The rise of nationalism during the breakup of Yugoslavia forced him to leave his country in 1992.

In 1998 he returned to Yugoslavia to make Cabaret Balkan, which won the FIPRESCI prize at the Venice Film Festival and at the European Film Awards. In 2001, Variety International Film Guide marked him as one of the world's top five directors of the year. The Museum of Modern Art in New York (MoMA) presented a full retrospective of his work in January 2008. It was BFI Southbank's (London) turn to organize in July 2010 a full retrospective of his 16 feature films, along with the publication of a monograph (in English) about his work.

Paskaljević lived between Belgrade and Paris, France and he held both Serbian and French citizenship. As of 2008 he was named Officer of the French Ordre des Arts et des Lettres.

He died on 25 September 2020 in Paris. His unproduced screenplay Cat's Cry (Mačji krik), cowritten with Đorđe Sibinović, went into production in 2023 with Sanja Živković as director, and both of Paskaljević's sons, Vladimir and Petar, as producers.

== Filmography ==
| Year | Film | Director | Writer | Producer | Awards / Notes |
|---|---|---|---|---|---|
| 1976 | Beach Guard in Winter | Yes | No | No | Golden Arena at Pula Film Festival |
| 1977 | The Dog Who Loved Trains | Yes | No | No | Bronze Arena at Pula Film Festival, Golden Berlin Bear nominee |
| 1979 | The Days on Earth Are Flowing | Yes | Yes | No | Bronze Arena at Pula Film Festival |
| 1980 | Special Treatment | Yes | Yes | No | Golden Arena at Pula Film Festival, Palme d'Or nominee |
| 1982 | Twilight Time | Yes | Yes | No | |
| 1984 | The Elusive Summer of '68 | Yes | No | No | |
| 1987 | Guardian Angel | Yes | Yes | Yes | |
| 1989 | Time of Miracles | Yes | Yes | Yes | |
| 1992 | Tango Argentino | Yes | Yes | Yes | Audience awards at Venice Film Festival and San Francisco International Film Festival |
| 1995 | Someone Else's America | Yes | No | No | Golden spike at Seminci |
| 1998 | Cabaret Balkan | Yes | Yes | Yes | Golden Anchor Award at Haifa International Film Festival |
| 2001 | How Harry Became a Tree | Yes | Yes | No | Best screenplay winner at Ghent International Film Festival |
| 2004 | Midwinter Night's Dream | Yes | Yes | Yes | Special Prize of the Jury at San Sebastián International Film Festival |
| 2006 | The Optimists | Yes | Yes | Yes | |
| 2009 | Honeymoons | Yes | Yes | Yes | Grand Prize of the Jury at Les Arcs European Film Festival |
| 2012 | When Day Breaks | Yes | Yes | Yes | Audience Choice Prize at Les Arcs European Film Festival |
| 2016 | Land of the Gods | Yes | Yes | No | Written in collaboration with Indian actor: Victor Banerjee |
| 2019 | Nonostante la nebbia | Yes | Yes | Yes | |
| 2024 | Cat's Cry (Mačji krik) | No | No | Yes | |

== See also ==
- The Prague film school
