= Wolfgang David =

Austrian violinist

Wolfgang David (born Wolfgang Sengstschmid in St. Pölten, Lower Austria) is an Austrian violinist.

== Biography ==
Viennese violinist Wolfgang David (born Wolfgang Sengstschmid in St. Pölten, Austria), established himself on the international stage as recitalist and soloist with some of today's leading orchestras, including the Royal Philharmonic Orchestra, Vienna Radio Symphony Orchestra, Tonkünstler Orchestra, Johannesburg Philharmonic Orchestra, Sofia Philharmonic, Berne Symphony Orchestra, and New York Virtuosi.

He has been well received by the press – The Washington Post wrote that he "scaled the heights of musicmaking" and the March 2001 edition of the British music magazine The Strad described his playing “as emotionally wide-ranging as one could hope for.”

== Discography ==
- Violin Concerto (2009)
  Royal Philharmonic Orchestra
  Emmanuel Siffert, conductor
  Wolfgang David, violin
  Peter Zazofsky, piano
- The Royal Lullaby (2006)
  Royal Philharmonic Orchestra
  Emmanuel Siffert, conductor
  Wolfgang David, violin
  Indhuon Srikaranonda, piano
- The New Canon (2005/2006)
  Wolfgang David, violin
  David Gompper, piano
- Star of the Country Down (2005/2006)
  Wolfgang David, violin
  David Gompper, piano
- Finnegan's Wake (2003)
  Wolfgang David, violin
  David Gompper, piano
- Viva concertante (2005/2006)
  Slovak Radio Orchestra
  Kirk Trevor, conductor
  Wolfgang David, violin
  Elisabeth Kropfitsch, violin
