= Divadlo DISK =

Theatre in Prague, Czech Republic

DISK Theatre
- Divadlo DISK
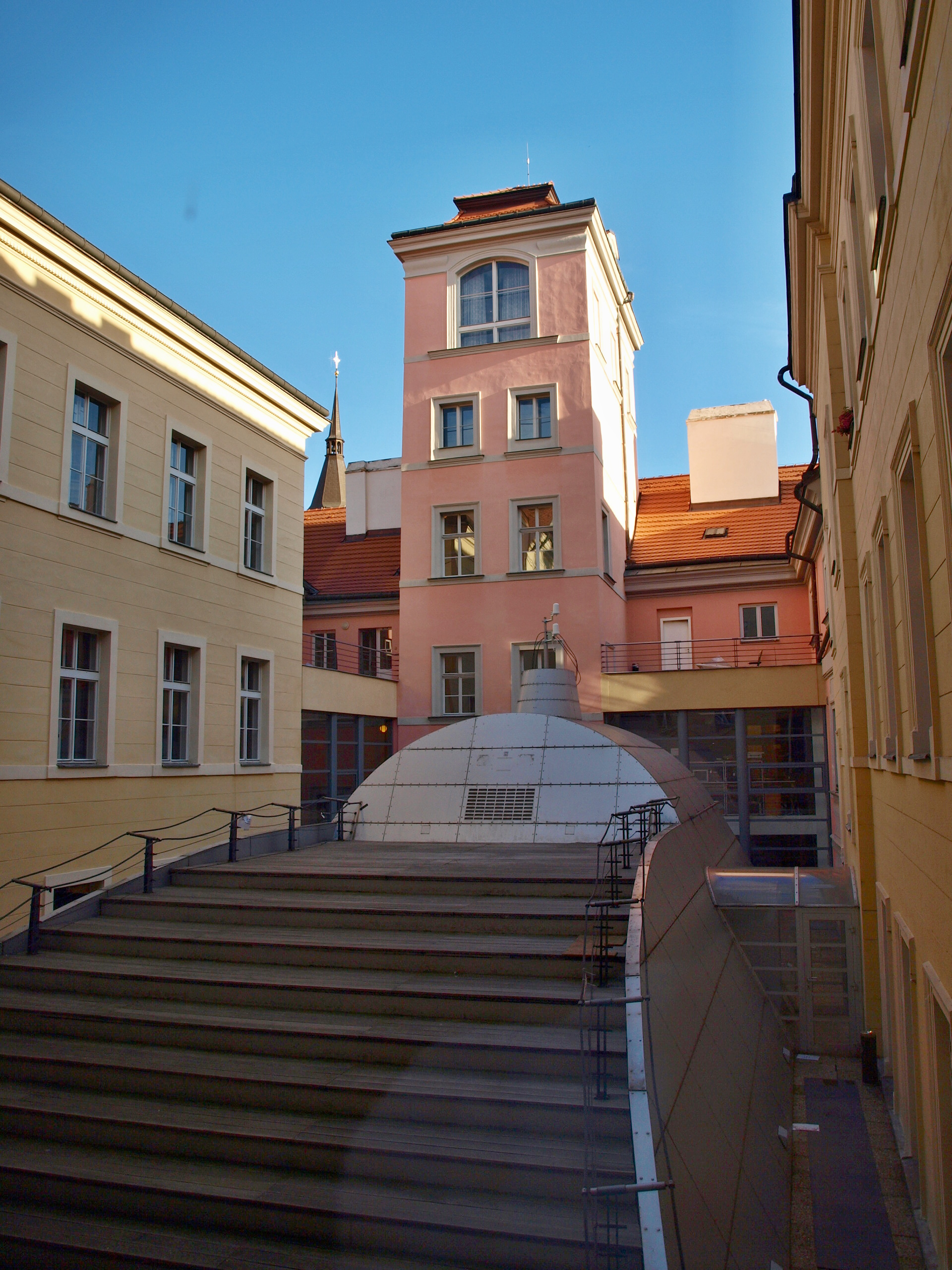
- DISK Theatre in Kokořovský palace
- Interactive map of DISK Theatre
- Address: Karlova 26; Prague 1 Czech Republic
- Coordinates: 50°5′9.44″N 14°25′2.02″E
- Capacity: 130

Construction
- Opened: 1945

Website
- Official website

DISK Theatre (abbreviation: Theatre State Conservatory) is a theatre in Prague, Czech Republic. It constitutes part of the Theatre Faculty of the Academy of Performing Arts in Prague. Performers are students of the Department of Dramatic Theatre (KCD) and of the Department of Alternative and Puppet Theatre.

== History ==
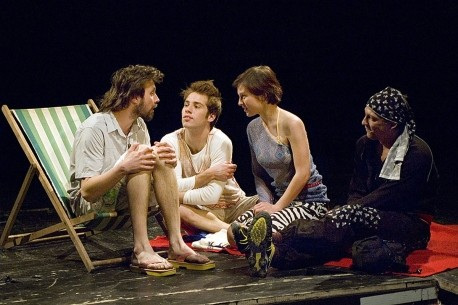
Performers at the DISK theater(2008).

The theater was founded in 1945 as part of the State Conservatory. Until 1999, the theater used the Celetná Theatre for its work. In February 1999, the conservatory moved into the new atrium of the Academy of Performing Arts, designed by architects Karel Hubacek and George Hakulína. Inauguration took place in February 1999. The new space has a capacity of about 130 seats.
