= Valentin Perko =

Slovenian cinematographer and director

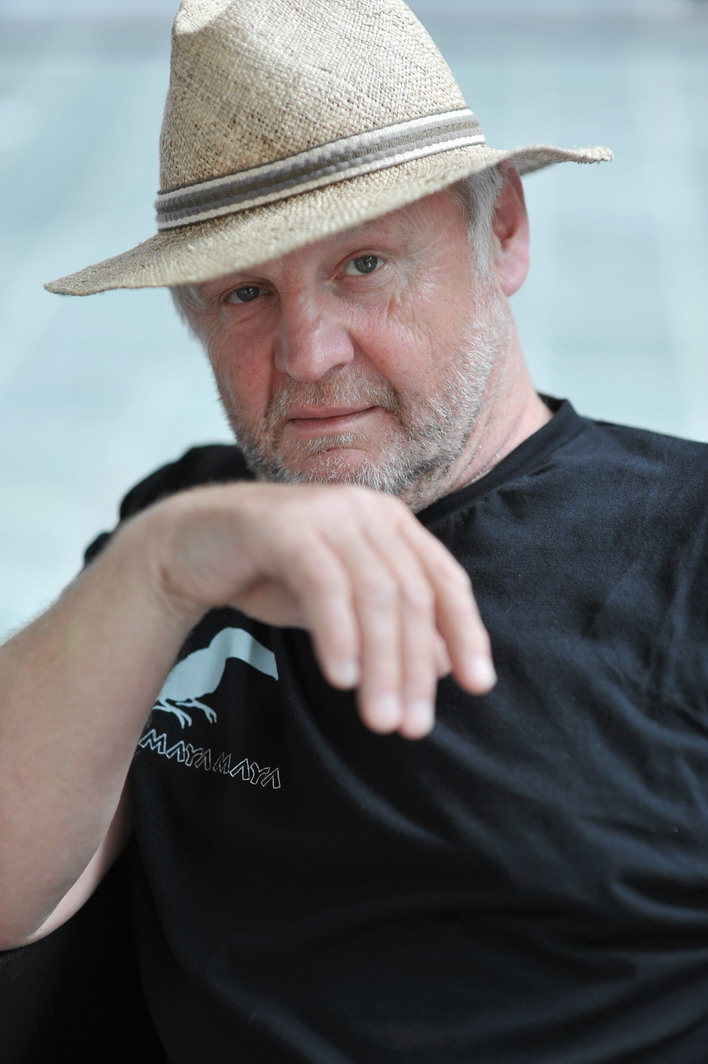
- Valentin Perko, DOP
- Born: 8 April 1950 (age 76); Ljubljana, LR Slovenija, FPR Yugoslavia
- Years active: 1977 - present
- Parent(s): Lojze Perko; Jožefa Gabrovec

Valentin Perko (born April 8, 1950, in Ljubljana), Slovenian cinematographer and director of photography. He is the son of the painter Lojze Perko, and brother of painter Tomaž Perko and psychologist Andrej Perko. Perko obtained a degree in photography in 1977 at FAMU in Prague, Czech Republic (Filmová a Televizní Fakulta Akademie Múzických Umění v Praze). His career took off as a cinematographer of documentary and commercial films, while also being active in television production. His works include many short and feature films with various directors. Perko's cinematographical expressive style is especially evident in the following films: Dih (1983), Maja in vesoljček (1988), Do konca in naprej (1990), Triangel (1991), Morana (1993), Ekspres, ekspres (1996), Brezno (1998) and television film Pet majskih dni (1997). He is the cinematographer of awarded experimental film Valcer za Tavžentarjeva dva (1981), followed by Učna leta izumitelja Polža (1982), Nobeno sonce (1984), Sonce za dva (1986), Cpprnica Zofka (1988), Herzog (1995), Napisan list (2000), and Director of Photography in Petelinji zajtrk (2007). Television films include Paralele (1987), Vaški učitelj (1993), Steber (1997) and 5 episodes TV series Novi svet (2003). Since 2009 Valentin Perko has worked as a senior lecturer at AGRFT (Slovenian Academy for Theatre, Television, Radio and Film, Ljubljana, Slovenia) and is also Dean of Camera Department.

== Filmography (Director of Photography) ==
Film	type	Year of production	Year of theatrical release	Length (minutes)
Oton Župančič	short film	1978	1978	019:02
Darilo, ki pomeni upanje - dializa	short film	1977	1977	011:13
Monolog Ivana Potrča	short film	1978	1978	016:56
V službi socializma in Boga	short film	1979	1980	012:15
Pogreb	short film	1979	1979	013:28
Venec	short film	1979	1979	013:45
Pogled stvari	short film	1979	1979	012:40
Prestop	feature film	1980	1980	088:54
Ljubezen	short film	1980	1980	011:00
Ristanc	short film	1981	1981	013:05
Valček za Taužentarjeva dva	short film	1981	1981	004:54
Sveča	short film	1981	1981	011:00
Učna leta izumitelja Polža	feature film	1982	1982	084:32
Too Much	short film	1982	1982	009:00
Dih	feature film	1983	1983	113:00
Kozolec	short film	1983	1984	012:00
Nobeno sonce	feature film	1984	1984	095:00
Kasač	short film	1984	1984	011:06
Senca	short film	1984	1985	009:00
Start	short film	1984	1985	003:00
Janoš	feature film	1984	1984	092:00
Kolizej	documentary film	1984	1984	039:00
Sonce za dva	TV film	1986	1987	076:00
Zakladi Slovenije	TV series	1986	1986	055:00
Paralele	TV film	1987	1987	077:00
Plečnikove Žale	TV documentary	1987	1987	044:50
Maja in vesoljček	feature film	1988	1988	072:40
Coprnica Zofka	feature film	1988	1988	082:49
Ječarji	feature film	1990	1990	084:17
Ribištvo	short film	1991	1991	025:00
Triangel	feature film	1991	1991	083:00
Morana	feature film	1991	1993	104:00
Vaški učitelj	TV drama	1993	1993	056:00
Povodni mož	short film	1995	1995	009:39
Hercog	feature film	1995	1997	085:00
Styria	short film	1995	1995	012:37
Ekspres, ekspres	feature film	1996	1997	074:00
Balkanska ruleta	short film	1997	1997	003:00
Črepinjice	short film	1997	1997	016:26
Pet majskih dni	TV film	1997	1997	067:00
Steber	TV film	1997	1997	068:00
Brezno	feature film	1998	1998	104:00
Noč v hotelu	short film	1998	1998	017:02
Mojstrovine Slovenije	TV series	1998	1999	025:00
Nepopisan list	feature film	1999	2000	092:00
Obrazi zelene reke	short film	1999	2000	019:00
Zadnji utrip	documentary film	1999	2000	041:00
Jezero	short film	1999	1999	015:10
Vrt	short film	1999	1999	011:38
Jabolko	TV film	2001	2001	045:00
Portret Urbana Kodra	documentary film	2002	2002	052:00
Maribor	documentary film	2002	2002	050:00
Novi svet	TV series	2003	2003	030:00
No fiesta Paeblo	documentary film	2003	2003	050:00
Tisoč let	short film	2003	2003	005:45
Zvesti prijatelji	TV film	2003	2004	101:02
Desperado Tonic	feature film	2004	2005	070:00
Zadnji tovor	documentary film	2004	2005	050:00
Zabranjena ljubav	TV series	2004	2004-2005	030:00
Zvesti prijatelji	TV series	2004	2007	030:00
Poklic Arne	documentary film	2005	2006	050:02
Tunel upanja	documentary film	2006	2006	053:00
Petelinji zajtrk	feature film	2007	2008	125:00
Roki na steni	short film	2008	2008	016:18
Morje v času mrka	feature film	2009	2009	082:00
Neizstreljeni naboj	TV film	2011	2011	055:00
Duhec	feature film	2012	2012	092:00
Duhec	TV series	2012	2012	030:00
Anina provizija	feature film	2016	2017	104:00

== List of awards and rewards ==
- 1980, Special award Metoda Badjura, Celje
- 1988, Award Metoda Badjura with degree, Celje
- 1991, Golden award Metoda Badjura, Celje
- 1993, silver award Metoda Badjura, Portorož
- 1997, Award for cinematography for Herzog and Ekspres, ekspres, Portorož
- 1997, Kodak award for cinematography, Portorož
- 2007, Jože Babič award, RTV Slovenia

== Sources ==
Enciklopedija Slovenije. (2002). Book 16. Ljubljana: Mladinska knjiga.

- "Katedra za kamero". AGRFT. Pridobljeno dne 17.3.2015.
- "sodelavci visokošolski učitelji in sodelavci". 17.3.2015. AGRFT.
- Valentin Perko at IMDb
- Festival evropskega in mediteranskega filma
- Praška filmska škola
