= Helikopter-Streichquartett =

Musical composition by Karlheinz Stockhausen

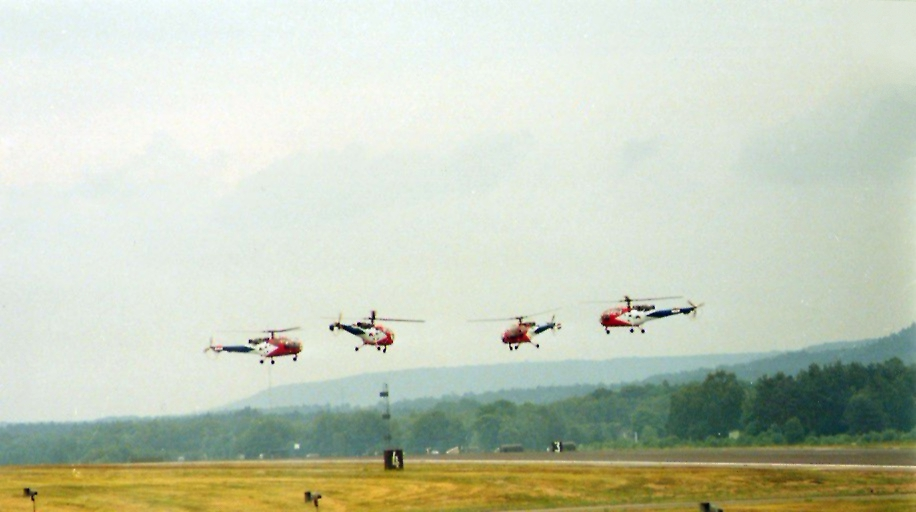
Dutch Grasshoppers aerobatics team, flying the Alouette helicopters they used in the world premiere of the Helicopter String Quartet

The Helikopter-Streichquartett (English: Helicopter String Quartet) is one of Karlheinz Stockhausen's best-known pieces, and one of the most complex to perform. It involves a string quartet, four helicopters with pilots, as well as audio and video equipment and technicians. It was first performed and recorded in 1995. Although performable as a self-sufficient piece, it also forms the third scene of the opera Mittwoch aus Licht ("Wednesday from Light"), from the opera cycle Licht.

== History ==
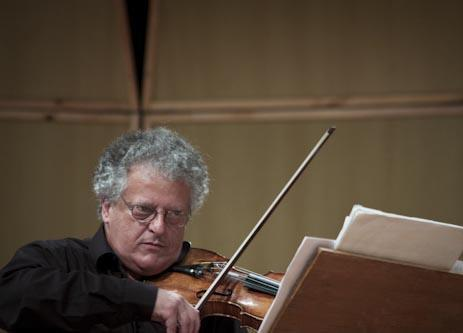
Irvine Arditti, leader of the Arditti Quartet, who premiered and made the first recordings of the Helicopter Quartet

The Helicopter Quartet was originally commissioned by Hans Landesmann of the Salzburger Festspiele in early 1991. Stockhausen's initial reaction was that he was not interested in writing a string quartet, but then one night he dreamed he was flying above four helicopters, each carrying a member of a string quartet; he could see into and through the transparent helicopters. He subsequently made some sketches and plans, but it was not until 1992–93 that he found the time to compose the quartet. By this time, he had had several more dreams concerning the piece, including one involving a swarm of bees and a violinist, about which Stockhausen said, "The buzzing made by lots of bees is a magic sound to me". The Arditti Quartet was to play the première. After Stockhausen finished his score, it was sent back to Landesmann for criticism. His reaction was positive, as was that of the Director of the Festspiele, Gerard Mortier. A long series of negotiations started with the Festspiele and the Austrian army, who were to lend the helicopters, as well as various TV channels who were airing the piece. In part because of protests by the Austrian Green Party, that it would be "absolutely impossible for Austrian air to be polluted by performing this Stockhausen", in the end the planned 1994 première had to be cancelled.

The first performances of the piece took place in Amsterdam on 26 June 1995, as part of the Holland Festival, with Alouette helicopters from the Royal Dutch Air Force display team, the Grasshoppers. The performers were: first violinist Irvine Arditti and pilot Marco Oliver; second violinist Graeme Jennings and pilot Lieutenant Denis Jans; violist Garth Knox and pilot Lieutenant Robert de Lange; cellist Rohan de Saram and pilot Captain Erik Boekelman. There were three performances given, at the Westergasfabriek, after two test flights at the same location the day before, and several earlier at an airfield in Deelen for the purpose of trying out the microphones. Following these performances, Stockhausen revised the score, adding about three minutes of material near the end, just before the descent, increasing the overall duration from about 29 minutes to 32 minutes. Since its premiere, the Helicopter Quartet has been performed "fairly regularly" and has become "the most iconic piece of classical music from the 1990s", though it was not presented in its full context, as the third scene of Mittwoch aus Licht, until the opera's staged premiere in August 2012.

In 2001 Angelin Preljocaj choreographed this music for a modern dance work titled Helikopter.

== Composition ==
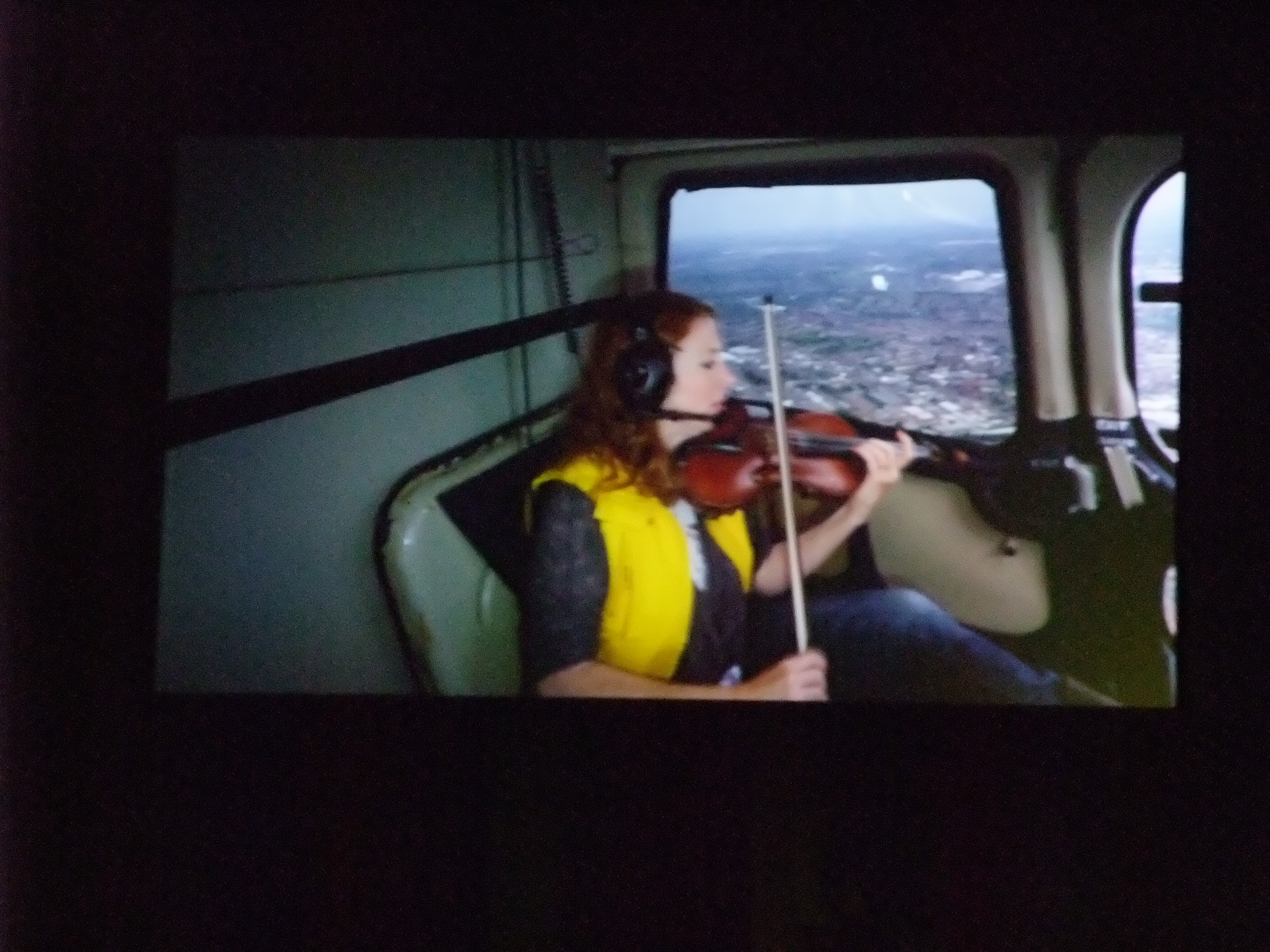
Jennymay Logan, second violin, Elysian Quartet, in the Birmingham Opera production of Mittwoch aus Licht, Argyle Works, Digbeth, Birmingham, 23 August 2012

The Licht cycle—as a whole and in all of its parts—is serially composed, being based upon a three-layered "superformula". This design principle is an extension of the series-based techniques Stockhausen developed at the beginning of the 1950s—a connection to which Stockhausen himself has repeatedly called attention in his theoretical explanations. The Quartet is based on a short portion of the Eve layer from the Wednesday segment of the superformula: D–F–G♭. After the initial ascent, there are three iterations of the three-voiced superformula, each time distributed among the four instruments, and each time with the Michael, Eve, and Lucifer lines in a different vertical arrangement. The superformula as a whole is successively transposed so that the Eve layer begins each time with the corresponding pitch from the "helicopter" segment: D–F–G♭. The durations of the three statements of the triple formula are also determined by the rhythms of the small "helicopter" segment.

More general traits found in the work are also characteristic of the serial fabric of Stockhausen's music. For example, the interpenetration of macro and micro dimensions, found in earlier compositions such as Kontakte, where Stockhausen compresses rhythm into pitch, or in Hymnen, where he slows down the sound of geese until they are revealed as the shouts of a football crowd. The violin tremolos here and also in Mittwoch's preceding scene, Orchester-Finalisten, invoke the sound of a buzzing mosquito, so "what the composer is also saying is that the mosquito is also a tiny helicopter", and the connection between the two is being made by the violin. Another is the way in which the scenic character of the Helicopter Quartet forms one of four "serial variants": The first and fourth scenes of the opera represent the idea of communication and cooperation, first when World Parliamentarians meet to debate the topic of love, and then when interplanetary delegates consider cosmic problems, while the second scene and this one revolve around the idea of community music making.

A third serial principle is the integration of distinct elements into a whole. This was expressed by Stockhausen in a text written in 1953:

Evidently, self-contemplation and the awareness of a universal, planned order exist today "more than ever". With this comes the desire to give the individual tone a very specific sense that transcends momentary saturation and the merely impulsive play of organization and combination; a sense, that is, of music as a representation of that comprehensive "global" structure in which everything is integrated.

In Licht generally this is seen in "scenic contexts that are not tied to a single, linear, teleological narrative, but as the compositional events in multi-dimensional, process-independent, run in folding, intersecting, or parallel layers and yet are held together by the principle of uniformity". In the Helicopter Quartet in particular this is manifested spatially, as the physical separation of the players from the audience and among themselves, circling in the sky in four different helicopters, is overcome through the use of audio-visual equipment, so that "only when transmitted via television screens and loudspeakers in the concert hall do the four-layered musical events fit together into a unified whole".

== Performance practice ==
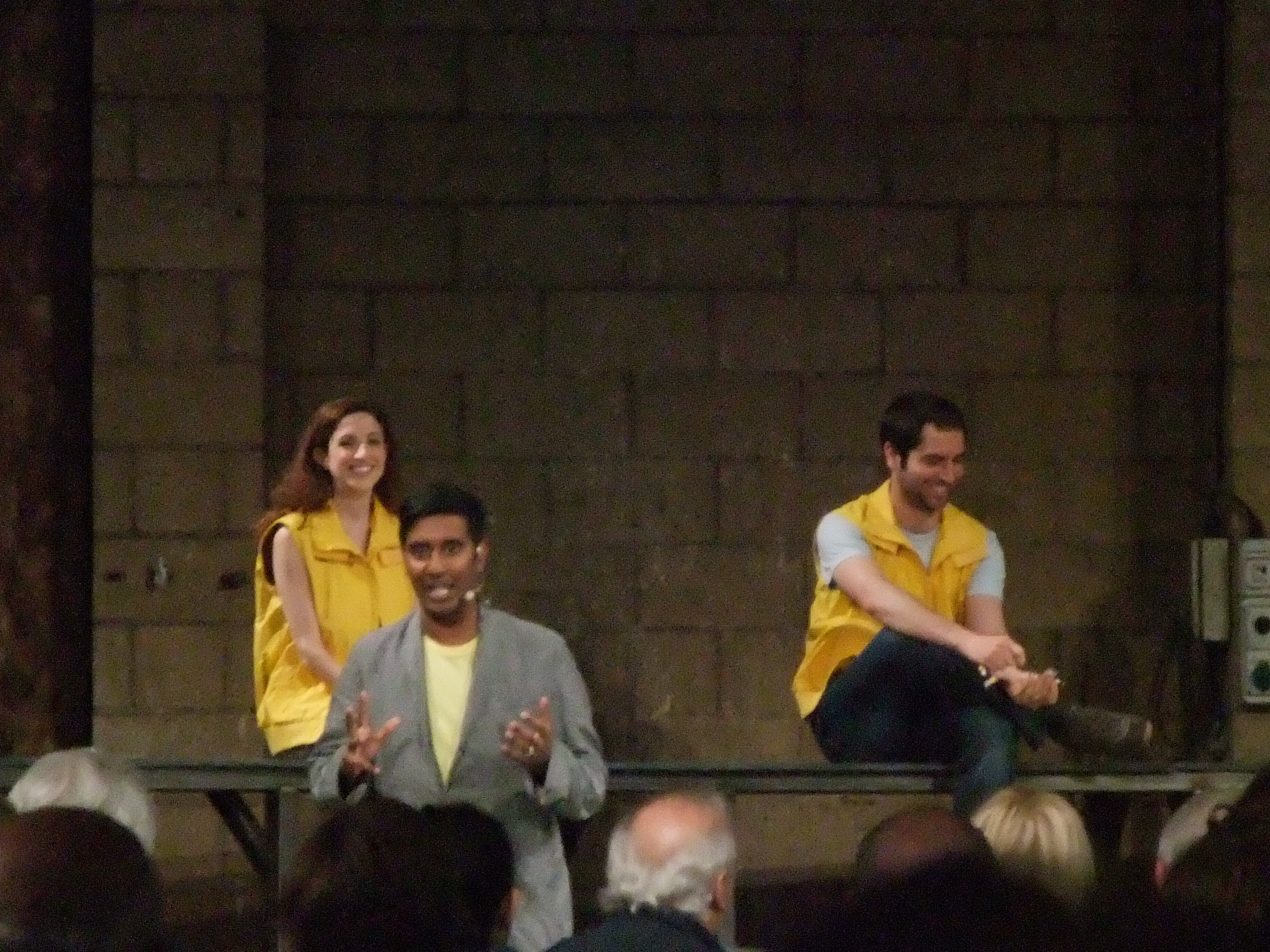
Moderator DJ Nihal introduces members of the Elysian Quartet (Laura Moody, cello, Vincent Sipprell, viola) before a performance on 23 August 2012, as part of the Birmingham Opera production of Mittwoch aus Licht at the Argyle Works, Digbeth, Birmingham

A performance requires: four helicopters, each equipped with a pilot and sound technician, television transmitter and three-channel sound transmitter, and an auditorium with four columns of televisions and loudspeakers, a sound projectionist with mixing desk, and a moderator (optional), as well as the members of the string quartet.

The piece focuses on Stockhausen's dreamed idea of a string quartet playing tremolos which blend so well with the timbres and the rhythms of the rotor blades that the helicopters sound like musical instruments. This is accomplished by using microphones placed so the helicopters may blend with the stringed instruments, with the instruments being heard as slightly louder than the blades.

The piece is played as follows: A moderator, who may be the sound projectionist, introduces the quartet, and then explains the technical aspects of the piece. The players then walk out, always being visible to the auditorium audience via the video cameras that follow them, until they have all arrived at and boarded their helicopters.

From the moment of takeoff until disembarkation the musicians and helicopters remain constantly in the view of the cameras, with video and audio (using three microphones in each helicopter) of each string player transmitted to their assigned group of television monitors in the auditorium. "The earth can be seen through the glass cockpit of the helicopter behind each player".

Then the piece begins. The helicopters circle at a radius of 6 km from the auditorium, changing altitude constantly to create the 'bounce' of the piece. All twelve incoming signals are controlled by the sound crew.

The descent lasts five minutes, with the decreasing sound of the rotor blades acting as a background as the quartet re-enter the hall. The moderator then takes questions and leads applause.

== Press reviews ==
Writing for The New York Times, Alex Ross called the premiere a "memorable spectacle" citing the virtuoso performances by both the Arditti and the Grasshoppers. However, his review was mostly negative:

German experimentalism in its classic form has evidently run its course. Nothing illustrated its obsolescence more lucidly than the recent premiere at the Holland Festival of a Helicopter String Quartet by Karlheinz Stockhausen ... it was not, as Mr. Stockhausen claimed, important research into new sound materials, nor anything of consequence in purely musical terms. It was a grandiose absurdist entertainment, not unlike Christo's wrapping of the Reichstag back in Berlin.

Andrew Clements in The Guardian marveled at Stockhausen's logistical achievement:

The technological complexities of making such a thing work almost flawlessly are immense (a planned performance in Salzburg last year failed, literally and metaphorically, to get off the ground), and in the context of Stockhausen's achievement as a composer the Helicopter Quartet may not be hugely significant, but as a reminder of the sheer force of his creative personality and organisational ability it is a remarkable if impossibly bizarre achievement. And what it all has to do with the opera only time will reveal.

In his review for The Times, Paul Griffiths discusses how the piece comments on the chamber music mentality and hints that the piece has a richer life as a concept:

Helikopter-Streichquartett says things about quartet psychology the placing of oneself at risk, the trust that others will come in on time (isolated visually and aurally, the players could get directions only from a click-track heard on headphones) and the devotion to duty...this is a work that can be just as well imagined as experienced. Indeed, the Helikopter-Streichquartett of the imagination is probably to be preferred, since the one big disappointment of the Amsterdam performance was that one had so little sense of the musicians the Arditti Quartet being up aloft: the monitors just showed us four guys in cramped conditions, bowing away.

Marlise Simons, writing in The New York Times, provides a snapshot of multiple critical reactions in the Dutch press:

The performance was widely reviewed in Dutch newspapers, which admired the flawless technical delivery but had less ear for the unusual sounds. The influential NRC-Handelsblad found "the hot-tempered music" from clattering aircraft disturbing and said the "noise of the rotorblades created tension" in the audience. But Yannis Anninos, a Greek composer who had flown from Athens to attend the concert, said the Helicopter Quartet was the "superb work of a genius."

Mr. Stockhausen said he had other performances in mind for the quartet. He was also asked if he thought it possible to raise an entire orchestra aloft in helicopters.

"Why not?" he said.

== The CD ==
The first CD was created on request of the Arditti Quartet themselves, and includes both the world-première recording and a studio recording of a revised version, which adds some material composed after the world première. The studio recording was made by the WDR on 7 December 1996 in Kürten, using the Übertragungswagen, or mobile studio. They used four different rooms in the studio, with the helicopter sounds dubbed in, using Sony 24-track tape.

== Discography ==
- Stockhausen, Karlheinz. Helikopter-Streichquartett: Uraufführung 1995 + Studioproduktion 1996. Arditti Quartet (Irvine Arditti, Graeme Jennings [world premiere] and David Alberman [studio recording of the revised score], violins; Garth Knox, viola; Rohan de Saram, cello); Grasshoppers (helicopter acrobatic team); Karlheinz Stockhausen, musical direction, recording supervision, sound projection, mix-down, and moderation [of the world premiere]. Stockhausen Complete Edition, Compact Disc 53 A-B (2 CDs). Kürten: Stockhausen-Verlag, 1999. Studio version also released on Montaigne Auvidis MO 782097 (CD).
- Stockhausen, Karlheinz. Helikopter-Streichquartett. Arditti Quartet (Irvine Arditti and David Alberman, violins; Garth Knox, viola; Rohan de Saram, cello); Grasshoppers (helicopter acrobatic team, recording from the third Amsterdam performance, mixed in). Arditti Quartet Edition 35. Montaigne Auvidis MO 782097 (single CD). 32'00". Paris: Montaigne Auvidis, 1999.

== Filmography ==
- Helicopter String Quartet, a film by Frank Scheffer. Close-up: documentaireserie waarin Frank Scheffer zijn visie geeft op diverse 20e-eeuwse componisten. [S.l.]: AVRO. Televisie-opname, 1995.
  - German DVD release (German and English, DVD) Helicopter String Quartet. Frank Scheffer; Karlheinz Stockhausen. Kürten, Germany: Stockhausen-Verlag, 2006.
  - UK release: Helicopter String Quartet. Frank Scheffer; Ton van der Lee; Karlheinz Stockhausen. German. Videorecording: DVD video 1 videodisc (77 min.). London: 2008.
  - French DVD release. Helicopter String Quartet. Karlheinz Stockhausen; Frank Scheffer. Videorecording: DVD video (77 mins. [erroneously listed as 113 min. in publisher's catalogue]). [Paris]: Idéale Audience International, 2008.
- Stockhausen: Helikopter Streichquartett (archive from 8 September 2012, accessed 13 March 2018). Sound Director: André Richard. a co-production with Red Bull & Salzburg Festival. Bernhard Fleischer Moving Images, 2003.
