= Helicopter String Quartet =

1996 film

DVD cover

Helicopter String Quartet (screen title: Karlheinz Stockhausen: Helicopter String Quartet) is a 78-minute 1996 Dutch English- and German-language independent underground experimental documentary art film directed by Frank Scheffer.

== Synopsis ==
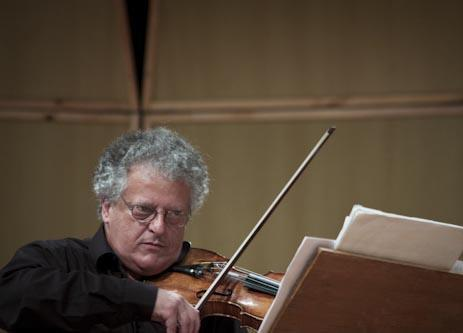
Irvine Arditti, leader of the Arditti Quartet, who premiered and made the first recordings of the Helikopter-Streichquartett

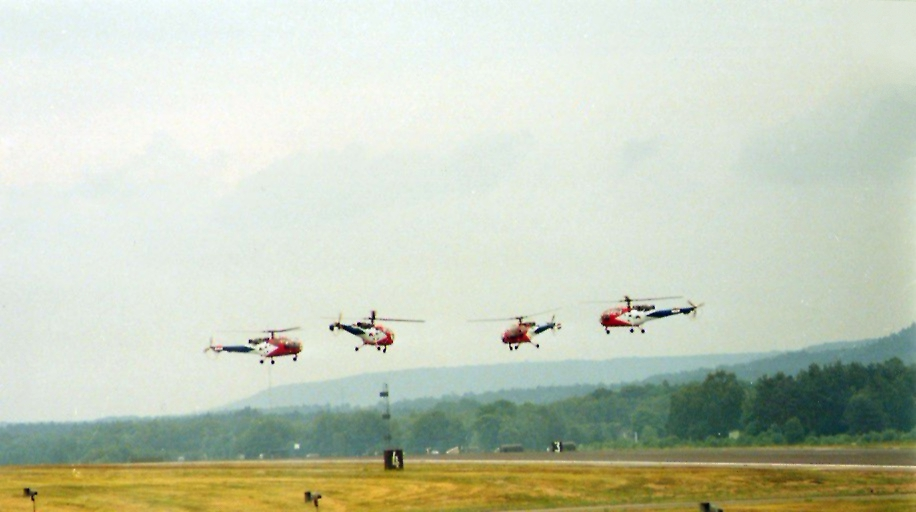
Dutch Grasshoppers aerobatics team, flying the Alouette helicopters they used in the world premiere of the Helikopter-Streichquartett

The film, produced by Ton van der Lee, documents the preparations and rehearsals in 1995 for the world-premiere performance by the Arditti Quartet of the 1993 composition Helikopter-Streichquartett (English: Helicopter String Quartet) by Karlheinz Stockhausen. This piece requires four separate helicopters (provided for the 1995 performances by the Royal Netherlands Air Force). Within it, each helicopter carries (in addition to the pilot) one member of a string quartet, a sound technician, television camera, video, and three-channel audio transmitters, and all flying through the air simultaneously. It was premiered at the Holland Festival. The film contains interviews with Stockhausen, the string players Garth Knox, Rohan de Saram, Irvine Arditti, and Graeme Jennings, and the pilots about the piece. The film was premiered at the Chicago International Film Festival in October 1996, where it was nominated for several awards, was also screened at the Buenos Aires International Festival of Independent Cinema in April 2005, and was released on DVD by Medici.tv's label Medici Arts.

== Reception ==
Critic Ben Sachs wrote: "I'm a dunce when it comes to the music, but I found the movie fascinating, in part because the story has so much ready-made suspense. Any number of things could go wrong in the execution of the quartet, and it's entertaining to see how the composer and his crew respond to each problem that arises—it's something of an intellectual action movie".
