= Klaus Maetzl =

Austrian violinist

Klaus Maetzl (1941 – 4 May 2016) was an Austrian violinist, noted as a founder of the Alban Berg Quartet.

He studied at the University of Music and Performing Arts in Vienna with Franz Samohyl, and studied further with Max Rostal. From 1967 to 1970, he was concertmaster of the Vienna Symphony.

In 1970, Maetzl was a founder member, with Günter Pichler, Hatto Beyerle and Valentin Erben, of the Alban Berg Quartet, in which he played second violin; he remained with the quartet until 1978. From 1982 he was a member of the Vienna Chamber Ensemble.

From 1971, he was a professor at the University of Music and Performing Arts. He served on the juries of several international competitions during his career.
