= Hatto Beyerle =

German-Austrian violist (1933–2023)

- Beyerle, c. 2004
- Born: 20 June 1933; Frankfurt, German Reich
- Died: 16 October 2023 (aged 90); Hanover, Lower Saxony, Germany
- Education: Hochschule für Musik Freiburg
- Occupations: Classical violist; Conductor; Academic teacher
- Organizations: Alban Berg Quartet; University of Music and Performing Arts Vienna; Hochschule für Musik, Theater und Medien Hannover; City of Basel Music Academy
- Awards: Deutscher Schallplattenpreis

Hatto Beyerle (20 June 1933 – 16 October 2023) was a German-Austrian violist who played mainly as a chamber musician, conductor and academic teacher. He was a founding member of the Alban Berg Quartet, and remained with the string quartet until 1981. He was professor of viola and chamber music at the University of Music and Performing Arts Vienna from 1964 to 1987, and also taught at the Hochschule für Musik, Theater und Medien Hannover, the City of Basel Music Academy and Fiesole School of Music, besides international master classes, influencing notable chamber music ensembles. He initiated and directed the European Chamber Music Academy in 2004.

== Life and career ==
Beyerle was born in Frankfurt on 20 June 1933, the son of a historian of law. He studied viola at the Hochschule für Musik Freiburg with Ulrich Koch, violin with Ricardo Odnoposoff in Vienna, composition with Alfred Uhl, and conducting with Hans Swarowsky.

In 1960 he was co-founder of the chamber orchestra Wiener Solisten with which he undertook numerous concert tours. In 1970 he founded the Alban Berg Quartet, a string quartet, together with violinists Günter Pichler and Klaus Maetzl, and cellist Valentin Erben. They played a house concert for Alban Berg's widow Helene, who supported the name. Beyerle and his wife organised the quartet's concert tours. He remained with ensemble until 1981. They won numerous national and international prizes, including Deutscher Schallplattenpreis, the Grand prix du Disque, and several Japanese prizes. Beyerle was twice awarded the title Artist of the Year by the Deutsche Phono-Akademie. From 1982 to 1998, Beyerle was a member of L'Ensemble.

From 1985 to 1998, Beyerle was conductor of the Konzertvereinigung of the Konzerthaus, Vienna.

=== Teaching ===
Beyerle worked from 1964 to 1987 as professor of viola and chamber music at the University of Music and Performing Arts Vienna. He then moved to the same position at the Hochschule für Musik, Theater und Medien Hannover, and from 1990 to 2004 he also taught at the City of Basel Music Academy. He gave regular master classes at the Fiesole School of Music in Florence from 1998, and guest classes for viola and chamber music in the US and Canada.

His students included Veronika Hagen, the Hagen Quartet, the Quartetto di Cremona, the Leipzig String Quartet, the Trio Jean Paul, the Artis Quartet, Meta4, the Boulanger Trio, and the Galatea Quartet.

In 2004 Beyerle was the initiator of the European Chamber Music Academy (ECMA) and artistic director of the Europäisches Kulturforum Grossraming in Austria.

=== Personal life ===
Beyerle's residence was a former windmill near Hanover where he moved in the 1980s. He was interested in philosophy, physics, religion, and their interplay with music.

Beyerle died in Hanover on 16 October 2023, at age 90.
