= Leipzig String Quartet =

German String Quartet

The Leipzig String Quartet (in German: Leipziger Streichquartett) is a German string quartet established in 1988. The ensemble was also part of the 'Ensemble Avangarde' with the pianist Steffen Schleiermacher from Leipzig.

== History ==
The Quartet was founded in 1988 as the "New Leipzig String Quartet". It kept this name until 1995. Three of the members were at the time at the first desks in the Leipzig Gewandhaus Orchestra until 1993, when they finally decided to devote themselves exclusively to chamber music.

They studied with Gerhard Bosse in Leipzig, former member and concertmaster of the Gewandhaus Quartet (1955–1977), with the Amadeus Quartet in London and Cologne, with violist Hatto Beyerle in Hanover and with Walter Levin, founding member and concertmaster of the LaSalle Quartet.

Since November 1991, the quartet has been developing its own concert series, "Pro Quatuor" in Leipzig. As part of the 'Ensemble Avangarde', the quartet is the co-founder of the 'musica nova' ensemble of the Leipzig Gewandhaus.

In 1996, the Leipzig Quartet launched the 'Beethoven String Quartet Cycle as a sign of European friendship', which has brought together more than fifteen cities in Europe. The nine discs of the first complete recording of all Franz Schubert's string quartets is completed in 1997. In 2002, the ensemble is in residence at the Madrid Teatro Real.

The Leipzig Quartet performed at the Gewandhaus from 1993 to 2000, in the cycle all the great quartets of Viennese Classicism and the Second Viennese School. In 1996 the members of the ensemble performed the German premiere of "À trois" for string trio and orchestra by Alfred Schnittke.

An intense concert activity takes them throughout Europe, North and South America, Australia, Japan, Israel, Africa and Asia. To date, the ensemble has visited more than 60 countries. Its sixty or so recordings, mainly on the German label Musikproduktion Dabringhaus und Grimm, have won several awards.

== Repertoire ==
The Quartet plays, alongside the classical repertoire, works from the classical, modern and contemporary repertoire.

The ensemble has performed premieres including works by Beat Furrer, Claus-Steffen Mahnkopf, Wolfgang Rihm, Steffen Schleiermacher, Christian Fumiste, Siegfried Thiele ('String Quartet in One Movement', 1997), Viktor Ullmann, Jörg Widmann, David Philip Hefti, Rainer Riehn, Ulrich Leyendecker and Bernd Franke.

Musical partners of the ensemble include clarinetist Karl Leister, cellist Michael Sanderling, violist Hartmut Rohde, pianists Alfred Brendel, Christian Zacharias and Andreas Staier, soprano Christiane Oelze, baritone Olaf Bär and clarinetist Klemzer Giora Feidman.

== Members ==
- Stefan Arzberger – 1st violin (2008–2015 and again since 2018)
- Tilman Büning – 2nd violin
- Ivo Bauer – viola
- Peter Bruns – violoncello (since 2019)

Former members:

- Andreas Seidel – 1st violin (until 2008)
- Conrad Muck – 1st violin (2015–2018)
- Matthias Moosdorf – violoncello (until 2019)

== Prizes ==
- ARD International Music Competition of Munich (2nd prize), in 1991.
- Prix de la promotion de la musique de la société Siemens, in 1992.
- Schneider-Schott Music Prize, in 1993 (for the series "musica nova")
- Diapason d'Or
- Cannes Classical Award (two nominations)
- ECHO Klassik, 1999, 2000, 2003, 2008 et 2012
- Indie-Awards in 1999 and 2000
