= Aron quartet =

Austrian string quartet

The aron quartet is a string quartet ensemble which was founded in 1998 by Ludwig Müller, Barna Kobori, Georg Hamann and Christophe Pantillon, four musicians working in Vienna. Their artistic careers have been decisively influenced by the members of the Alban Berg Quartet as well as by Ernst Kovacic and Heinrich Schiff. Further decisive impulses for her musical career came from Isaac Stern, Max Rostal, William Primrose, Mischa Maisky, Ralph Kirshbaum and Sandor Végh.

The aron quartet also performs together with artists like Oleg Maisenberg, Bruno Canino, Philippe Entremont, Wenzel Fuchs, Sharon Kam and members of the Alban Berg Quartet. In 2002, the aron quartet was a guest in the cycle of the Alban Berg Quartet at the Wiener Konzerthaus.

== History ==
In the founding year, the Vienna Debut took place, which was well received by the public and press. Since then - also in collaboration with Heinz Holliger, Heinrich Schiff, as well as members of the Amadeus, LaSalle and Alban Berg Quartets - a wide-ranging repertoire has been developed.

The aron quartet's intention to devote itself to the works of the Second Viennese School as well as to the classical literature for string quartet led, even in its founding year, to an invitation to create its own cycle at the Arnold Schönberg Center in Vienna as Quartet in Residence, in which the aron quartet presents compositions of the 18th, 19th and 20th centuries.

The aron quartet has performed extensively throughout Europe, the US, Mexico and Japan, as well as at renowned festivals (Vienna Festival, International String Quartet Festival Prague, Biennale di Venezia, Schönberg Festival, Festival KlangBogen Wien, Festival Cervantino, Kuhmo Festival, Stresa Festival among others).

In 2001, the quartet made its debut at Carnegie Hall (New York) and in 2002 in London's Wigmore Hall and the Tchaikovsky Conservatory in Moscow. In 2004, at the Vienna Musikverein, where the quartet performed all of Erich Korngold's string quartets and his piano quintet in a four-part cycle in 2007. In 2008, the aron quartet founded the chamber music festival Schloss Laudon, which is especially dedicated to composers who were persecuted under the Nazi regime. The quartet's 10th anniversary was celebrated in November 2008 with a very successful concert in Wiener Konzerthaus. For 2009, the aron quartet was again invited to perform a Haydn-Martinů cyclus at the Wiener Musikverein as well as a 3-part Korngold cycle at the Opéra Bastille in Paris. Also in Vienna, an Schönberg cycle took place in autumn 2009.

== Recordings ==
In 1999, the first CD of the aron quartet was released with works by Schubert, Schönberg, Mozart and Viktor Ullmann. In February 2002, a concert by the quartet was broadcast throughout Europe by the Österreichischer Rundfunk as part of the European Broadcasting Union.

Further CD recordings include string quartets by Franz Schubert (Rosamunde and Der Tod und das Mädchen, Preiser Records 90549) and a CDc box set with the complete recording of all works for string quartet by Arnold Schönberg (Preiser Records 90572), for which the aron quartet was awarded the Pasticcio Prize. This recording is considered by the international press to be one of the best recordings of 20th century chamber music works.

For Cascavelle, the piano quintets by Dvořák and Franck were recorded with Philippe Entremont. In autumn 2009, a complete recording of the string quartets by Erich Wolfgang Korngold and his piano quintet (with Henri Sigfridsson, piano) was released by cpo/ORF and in spring 2010 a CD with works by Ravel, Schostakovich, David Chaillou, Kirill Zaborov and Vassiliev was released by Preiser.
