= String Quartets (Ligeti) =

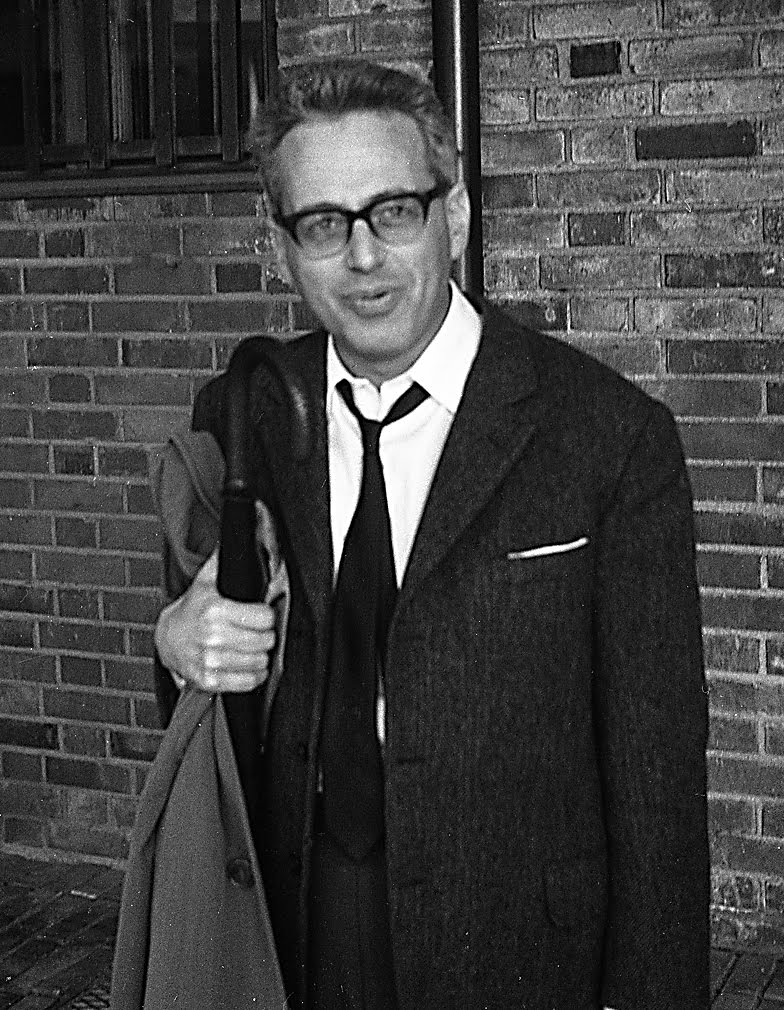
György Ligeti in the 1960s

The Hungarian composer György Ligeti published three string quartets: two string quartets proper (1953–54, 1968) and a student piece from 1950 published toward the end of his life. The first two quartets represent his early period, inspired by Béla Bartók, and middle period, which was largely micropolyphonic.

In 2012, sketches and notes for his projected String Quartets Nos. 3 and 4 were discovered by Bianca Ţiplea Temeș at the Paul Sacher Stiftung, and represent Ligeti's late period.

== Andante and Allegretto ==
These two movements were written for the graduation exam at the Franz Liszt Academy of Music in Budapest, with a stylistic uncertainty. The piece was premiered by the Arditti Quartet in 1994 at the Salzburg Festival. The movements are about 13 minutes in total duration.

1. Andante cantabile
2. Allegretto poco capriccioso

== String Quartet No. 1 (Métamorphoses nocturnes) ==
Ligeti's String Quartet No. 1, titled Métamorphoses nocturnes, was composed in 1953–54. It is thus representative of what Ligeti used to call "the prehistoric Ligeti", referring to the works he wrote before leaving Hungary in 1956. This quartet was heavily inspired by Bartók's third and fourth quartets, so much so that it was called "Bartók's seventh string quartet" by fellow Hungarian composer György Kurtág. Ligeti knew these works only from their scores, performances of them being banned under communist regimes at the time.

The quartet is approximately 21 minutes long, and was premiered at the Vienna Musikverein on 8 May 1958 by the Ramor Quartet, an ensemble that had also fled into exile. It is in one continuous movement, which can be divided into 17 sections:

1. Allegro grazioso
2. Vivace, capriccioso
3. A tempo
4. Adagio, mesto
5. Presto – Prestissimo
6. Molto sostenuto – Andante tranquillo
7. Più mosso
8. Tempo di Valse, moderato, con eleganza, un poco capriccioso
9. Subito prestissimo
10. Subito: molto sostenuto
11. Allegretto, un poco gioviale
12. Allarg. Poco più mosso
13. Subito allegro con moto, string. poco a poco sin al prestissimo
14. Prestissimo
15. Allegro comodo, gioviale
16. Sostenuto, accelerando – Ad libitum, senza misura
17. Lento

== String Quartet No. 2 ==
Ligeti's String Quartet No. 2 was composed between February and August 1968. It is approximately 21 minutes long. It is dedicated to the LaSalle Quartet, who gave its first performance in Baden-Baden on 14 December 1969.

The five movements differ widely from each other in their types of motion. In the first, the structure is largely broken up, as in Aventures. In the second, everything is reduced to very slow motion, and the music seems to be coming from a distance, with great lyricism. The pizzicato third movement is another of Ligeti's machine-like studies, hard and mechanical, whereby the parts playing repeated notes creates a "granulated" continuum. In the fourth, which is fast and threatening, everything that happened before is crammed together. Lastly, in strong contrast, the fifth movement spreads itself out. In each movement, the same basic configurations return, but each time their coloring or viewpoint is different, so that the overall form only really emerges when one listens to all five movements in context.

The quartet consists of five movements:

1. Allegro nervoso
2. Sostenuto, molto calmo
3. Come un meccanismo di precisione
4. Presto furioso, brutale, tumultuoso
5. Allegro con delicatezza

== String Quartets Nos. 3 and 4 ==
In 2012, musicologist Bianca Ţiplea Temeș discovered sketches and notes for Ligeti's projected String Quartets Nos. 3 and 4 at the Paul Sacher Stiftung.

The third quartet was commissioned by the Festival d'automne in Paris and was eventually planned to be a single movement work, like the first string quartet, but was also considered to be in six or three movements, with the three lasting about 12' + 3' + 6' minutes in total. The piece would be dedicated to the Arditti Quartet, entirely microtonal, inspired by the hyperchromaticism of Gesualdo, and inspired by melodic ideas from Burma, Uganda, Zimbabwe, Java, Bali, and Cameroon. It's also suggested that the entire quartet would be tuned in scordaturas based on harmonic partials, akin to the violin and viola in Ligeti's Violin Concerto.

The fourth quartet would be dedicated to the Kronos Quartet, and be inspired by melodic ideas from Burma, Cameroon, Romania and Hungary. The quartet was projected to have a pizzicato movement, uneven tremolo, and the harmony would also be very chromatic, but also spectral and with complex polyrhythms.
