= Isabel Charisius =

- Genres: Classical
- Occupations: Classical viola player; Academic teacher
- Instrument: Viola

Isabel Charisius is a classical violist and an academic teacher. She was a member of the Alban Berg Quartett and a teacher at the universities of music of Cologne and Berlin.

== Career ==
Charisius is focused on chamber music. She was the viola player of the Alban Berg Quartett from 2005, after the death of Thomas Kakuska and upon his wish, until its dissolution. A concert in London's Queen Elizabeth Hall in 2008 with quartets by Haydn, Berg and Beethoven received a review mentioning: "When Charisius was allowed the bass-line, as in some moments in the slow movement of the Haydn, she produced a magical, burnished sound like liquid gold".

Charisius was a lecturer at the Musikhochschule Köln from 2005 to 2013. She has been a teacher of viola and chamber music at the Hochschule Luzern. She has conducted master classes, for example at the Guildhall School of Music in London, the Britten-Pears School in Aldeburgh and the Universität der Künste in Berlin.
