= Levine Andrade =

Indian-born British musician (1954–2018)

- Born: 12 November 1954; Mumbai, India
- Origin: London, England
- Died: 20 November 2018 (aged 64)
- Genres: Pop, rock, jazz, film scores, chamber music
- Occupations: Composer, instrumentalist, conductor
- Instruments: Viola, Violin
- Years active: 1970–2018
- Website: telefilmonic.co.uk

Levine Andrade (1954 – 20 November 2018) was an Indian-born British musician (violin and viola), and conductor.

== Early life ==
Levine was born in Bombay to his parents Bonaventure and Juliana, and emigrated to England. Following a scholarship to the Yehudi Menuhin School at the age of 9 he became one of its first twelve members and was tutored by Robert Masters and Yehudi Menuhin. At the age of 11, BBC Television made a full documentary about him in their series The World of a Child. Just before leaving the school he took up the viola, which he studied with Patrick Ireland who was coaching chamber music at the school.

== Arditti Quartet ==
Andrade became one of the founder members of the Arditti Quartet with Irvine Arditti, Lennox Mackenzie and John Senter, inspired by their mutual interest in 20th-century music. In the seventeen years he played with them, the quartet had an unparalleled career, performing at almost every major music festival throughout the world to critical acclaim. They were asked to play the opening recital for the new concert hall of the Louvre Museum in Paris, and the live recording of that concert was awarded one of France's highest recording awards.

He left his very busy touring schedule in 1990 to spend more time with his wife and four children and to work in London as a freelance musician.

== 2008–2018 work ==
Levine conducted music for film, television, radio and record albums, as well as founding the London Telefilmonic Orchestra to play for various films and television commercials, including the Marlene Dietrich parody for Specsavers in the UK. He also wrote a film score for Strings, a film based on the true-life story of a Bosnian cellist.

He was also brought into the 1997 re-recording of Elton John's "Candle in the Wind" by Beatles producer, George Martin, for the Diana, Princess of Wales Tribute single.

== Awards ==
- Ernst von Siemens Music Prize 1999 as part of the Arditti Quartet for "lifetime achievement" in music

== Film credits ==
- Chatarra (1991)
- Song for a Raggy Boy (2003)
- The Great Water (2004)
- The Road Home (2010)

== Musical credits ==
- Baby the Stars Shine Bright by Everything but the Girl
- "Divinity" by The Isness
- Laughing Stock by Talk Talk
- "Candle in the Wind 1997" by Elton John
- Whitbourn: Luminosity & Other Choral Works (2010)
- "Codex" by Radiohead
