= Kennedy Moretti =

- Born: Kennedy Moretti; 1966 (age 59–60); São Paulo, Brazil
- Instrument: Piano

Kennedy Moretti (born 1966) is a Brazilian pianist and music professor.

== Biography ==
Born in São Paulo, Brazil, Kennedy Moretti studied piano at the São Paulo University and later at the Franz Liszt Academy of Music (Budapest, Hungary) and in Vienna at the University of Music and Performing Arts. He later worked as an accompanist and music assistant at the Hungarian State Opera House and in Austria with the Neue Oper Wien and the Neue Oper Austria at the Volkstheater.

In the 90s, Moretti moved to Spain and was the senior accompanist of Alfredo Kraus' class at the Queen Sofía College of Music, where he continues teaching at the Institute for Chamber Music. Until 2006 he was a chamber music professor at the Conservatorio Superior de Musica in Salamanca and currently holds teaching positions at the Catalonia College of Music in Barcelona and Music Conservatoire in Zaragoza.

Kennedy Moretti has performed as a chamber music and vocal accompanist in Spain, the United Kingdom, France, Hungary, Brazil, Germany and Austria with soloists such as María Espada, Alfredo Kraus, David Quiggle, Ruggero Raimondi, Aquiles Machado, Hagai Shaham, and the Cuarteto Casals among others.

He has also recorded for RTVE, Austrian Public Broadcasting, Extraplatte, and Calando labels.
