= Alban Berg Quartett =

Austrian string quartet founded in 1970

- Origin: Vienna, Austria
- Genres: Classical
- Occupation: Chamber ensemble
- Years active: 1971–2008
- Labels: Teldec, EMI

The Alban Berg Quartett (ABQ) was a string quartet founded in Vienna, named after the composer Alban Berg. Active from 1970 to 2008, the group included first violinist Günter Pichler and cellist Valentin Erben, while the second violinist was briefly Klaus Maetzl (1971–1978) and Gerhard Schulz from then onwards. The violist changed the most, Hatto Beyerle, Thomas Kakuska and Isabel Charisius.

== History ==
The Berg Quartett was founded in 1970 by four young professors of the Vienna Academy of Music, and made its debut in the Vienna Konzerthaus in autumn 1971. The widow of the composer Alban Berg, Helene, attended an early private concert after which she gave her consent for the quartet to use her husband's name.

The Quartet's repertoire was centered on the Viennese classics, but with a serious emphasis on 20th-century classical music. It was the stated goal of the quartet to include at least one modern work in each performance. Their repertoire spanned from Early Classicism, Romanticism, to the Second Viennese School (Alban Berg, Arnold Schoenberg, Anton Webern), Béla Bartók and embraced many contemporary composers. This took expression not the least in personal statements by composers like Witold Lutosławski and Luciano Berio, of whom the former said: "Personally I am indebted to the Alban Berg Quartet for an unforgettable event. Last year in Vienna, they played my quartet in a way such as will never be likely equaled."

Following an invitation of Walter Levin (founder of the LaSalle Quartet) the ABQ studied intensively for the better part of a year in the USA. The focus of their activities in Europe became annual concert cycles at the Wiener Konzerthaus, at London's Queen Elizabeth Hall, the Frankfurt Alte Oper, the Théâtre des Champs Elysées in Paris, the Philharmonic Hall in Cologne, the Zurich Opera, as well as regular concerts at most major halls and venues around the world (among them La Scala, Concertgebow Amsterdam, Berliner Philharmonie, Carnegie Hall, Teatro Colón, Suntory Hall, etc.) and all the major music festivals such as the Berliner Festwochen, the Edinburgh Festival, IRCAM in the Pompidou Centre, the Maggio Musicale Fiorentino, and the Salzburg Festival. The ABQ was an Honorary Member of the Wiener Konzerthaus and Associate Artist of the Royal Festival Hall London.

From 1993 until 2012, the members of the Alban Berg Quartett were lecturing at the Cologne Conservatory in succession of the Amadeus Quartet. Quartets who studied with the Alban Berg Quartett include the Cuarteto Casals, the Schumann Quartett, the Amber Quartet (China), the Fauré Quartet, the Aviv Quartet, the aron quartett, the Amaryllis Quartet, and in particular the Belcea Quartet, and the Artemis Quartet.

The composers that wrote string quartets for the Alban Berg Quartett include, in chronological order, Fritz Leitermeyer, Erich Urbanner (Quartets Nos. 1 and 4), Roman Haubenstock-Ramati (Quartets Nos. 1 and 2), Gottfried von Einem (Quartet No. 1), Wolfgang Rihm (Quartet No. 4 and "Requiem for Thomas"), Alfred Schnittke (Quartet No. 4), Zbigniew Bargielski ("Les temps ardente"), Luciano Berio ("Notturno"), and Kurt Schwertsik ("Adieu Satie").

In 2005, Thomas Kakuska died of cancer. In accordance with his wish, the ABQ continued performing with Isabel Charisius, a student of his. But as cellist Valentin Erben said, "There was a big rupture in our hearts" and the quartet retired in 2008. The concert in memoriam to Thomas Kakuska in the Wiener Konzerthaus' Großer Saal featured a who's-who of classical music, including an orchestra of friends and students of the quartet. Among them were Angelika Kirchschlager, Elisabeth Leonskaja, Irvine Arditti, Magdalena Kožená, Thomas Quasthoff, Helmut Deutsch, Alois Posch, Heinrich Schiff, and Sir Simon Rattle; the orchestra was conducted by Claudio Abbado. After a worldwide farewell tour in July 2008, the ABQ ended its career.

== Recordings ==
Recordings were an important part of the work of the Alban Berg Quartett. Among the most famous recording projects are the complete string quartets by Beethoven (EMI, which have sold more than a million copies), Brahms (Teldec and EMI), the late Haydn (EMI), the late Mozart (Teldec and EMI) and the late Schubert (EMI), but their repertoire on disc stretched further to Mendelssohn, Schumann, Janácek, Stravinsky, Berg, Webern, Bartók, von Einem, Lutosławski, Rihm, Berio, Haubenstock-Ramati to Schnittke and beyond. Many of the latter, contemporary, composers wrote works specially dedicated to the ABQ. After EMI released a live recording of their 1985 Carnegie Hall debut, the quartet preferred making live recordings for the last 20 years of its existence. Among them was—following their original studio Beethoven cycle from the late 70s and early 80s—a new Beethoven String Quartet cycle recorded live at the Konzerthaus during the Vienna Festival in 1989 and released on CD, video, and DVD. The Alban Berg Quartett recorded chamber music with some of the finest soloists of their time, including the piano quintets of Robert Schumann (with Philippe Entremont), Schubert and Brahms (with Elisabeth Leonskaja) and Dvoràk (with Rudolf Buchbinder), the Schubert string quintet (with Heinrich Schiff), the Brahms clarinet quintet (with Sabine Meyer), and the Mozart piano quartets and the piano quintet arrangement of the concerto KV 414 (with Alfred Brendel). For their recordings, the ABQ received more than 30 international awards, among them the Grand Prix du Disque, the Deutscher Schallplattenpreis, the Japanese Grand Prix, the Edison Award, and the Gramophone Award. Beyond recording, the ABQ collaborated regularly with the likes of Maurizio Pollini, András Schiff, and Tabea Zimmermann.

== Members ==
Period	1st violin	2nd violin	Viola	Violoncello
1970–1978	Günter Pichler (d. 2026)	Klaus Maetzl (d. 2016)	Hatto Beyerle (d. 2023)	Valentin Erben
1978–1981	Günter Pichler (d. 2026)	Gerhard Schulz	Hatto Beyerle (d. 2023)	Valentin Erben
1981–2005	Günter Pichler (d. 2026)	Gerhard Schulz	Thomas Kakuska (d. 2005)	Valentin Erben
2005–2008	Günter Pichler (d. 2026)	Gerhard Schulz	Isabel Charisius	Valentin Erben

== Further reading and films ==
- DIE ZEIT Klassik-Edition v.16 | Alban Berg Quartett. Die Zeit, Hamburg 2006, ISBN 3-476-02216-1.
- Dieter Rexroth, Rainer Wilker (editors): Ludwig van Beethoven. The String Quartets. Alban Berg Quartet Alter Oper, Frankfurt, Cologne Philharmonic, and Berliner Festspiele, 1987.
- Franz Schubert: "Death and the Maiden" (with Dietrich Fischer-Dieskau) directed by Bruno Monsaingeon (EMI Records)
- "The Alban Berg Quartett in St. Petersburg 1991" Unitel Classica
