= Galatea Quartet =

The Galatea Quartet from Zurich is a young string quartet. It has existed in its original configuration since its inception in early 2005, when violist David Schneebeli left the formation in Summer 2013. His successor is Hugo Bollschweiler.

The ensemble has already won prizes at the Geneva International Music Competition, at the International Chamber Music Competition in Osaka or at the Migros Chamber Music Competition in Switzerland. Since 2006 the quartet has been participating in the sessions of the European Chamber Music Academy (ECMA) with professors such as Hatto Beyerle, Johannes Meissl, Christoph Richter etc. In Zurich, the quartet took lessons with Stephan Goerner of the Carmina Quartet. They also studied with the Artemis Quartet in Berlin. The quartet since performs numerous concerts in Europe and abroad (Japan, India, Egypt, Albania etc.). The quartet is also performing world premieres of contemporary music and works with artists such as Jon Lord, founder of Deep Purple, or local bands. Their Debut-CD with Sony Classics was published in 2011 and is dedicated to the string quartet works by Swiss-American composer Ernest Bloch.

== Members ==
- Yuka Tsuboi, Violin
- Sarah Kilchenmann, Violin
- Hugo Bollschweiler, Viola
- Julien Kilchenmann, Cello
