= Frank Scheffer =

Dutch cinematographer and producer

- Born: 19 March 1956 (age 70); Venlo, Limburg, Netherlands
- Education: Dutch Film Academy
- Occupations: Film director, film producer
- Children: 3

Frank Scheffer (born 1956 in Venlo) is a Dutch director, cinematographer and producer of documentary film, mostly known for his work Conducting Mahler (1996) on the 1995 Mahler Festival in Amsterdam with Claudio Abbado, Riccardo Chailly, Riccardo Muti and Simon Rattle.

== Education ==
Scheffer was schooled at the Academy for Industrial Design (Eindhoven), the "Vrije Academie" Art College in The Hague, where he studied with the famous experimental filmmaker Frans Zwartjes and is a graduate from the Dutch Film Academy in Amsterdam.

== Career ==
Early films include Zoetrope People (1982), a documentary on Francis Ford Coppola and his studio with Wim Wenders, Tom Waits, Vittorio Storaro and others, as well as documentaries on the Dalai Lama and various socio/cultural subjects. In 1985 he directed the music video A Day for the band XYMOX on the 4AD Records label, leading him towards musical subjects. 1987 saw his short experimental films Wagner's Ring, a distillation of The Ring in 3'50" conceived with John Cage; and Stoperas 1/2 which was created to be shown with Cage's Europeras 1 & 2. Collaborations with Cage continued with the conceptual film Chessfilmnoise (1988), a documentary on Cage and Elliott Carter Time Is Music (1988), and From Zero (1995) in collaboration with Andrew Culver.

Scheffer’s films on music constitute an overview of the great composers of the 20th century — from Conducting Mahler (1996) on the 1995 Mahler Festival in Amsterdam with Claudio Abbado, Riccardo Chailly, Riccardo Muti and Simon Rattle to Five Orchestral Pieces (1994) on Arnold Schoenberg's work conducted by Michael Gielen and The Final Chorale (1990) on Igor Stravinsky's Symphonies of Wind Instruments conducted by Reinbert de Leeuw.

Further documentaries include films on Louis Andriessen (The Road, 1997, conducted by Péter Eötvös), Luciano Berio (Voyage to Cythera from 1999 on his Sinfonia conducted by the composer), Pierre Boulez (Eclat, 1993), and (Helikopter String Quartet, 1996) with Karlheinz Stockhausen and the Arditti Quartet.

The history of Electronic Music, from Stockhausen to DJ Spooky and Squarepusher, was the subject of Sonic Acts film in (1998). This was followed by three experimental projects searching for the influence of the digital medium in film and music: Sonic Images (1998), Sonic Fragments / The Poetics of Digital Fragmentation (1999) and Sonic Genetics (2000).

In 1999 Scheffer made Music for Airports, a video on Brian Eno's music of the same name as arranged by Bang on a Can founders Julia Wolfe, Michael Gordon, David Lang and Evan Ziporyn. The sprawling In the Ocean (2001), on present day New York composers, features Steve Reich, Philip Glass, Elliott Carter, John Cage, Brian Eno and the Bang on a Can founders.

Scheffer is also working on several in depth films on specific composers — The Present Day Composer Refuses to Die on Frank Zappa, in cooperation with the Zappa Family Trust (2000, featuring The Mothers of Invention, Pierre Boulez and Ensemble Modern), and the 90-minute Zappa feature Phaze II, The Big Note (2002), to be followed by a third film which will complete his Zappa trilogy. Scheffer has been following and filming Elliott Carter for 25 years; this culminated in A Labyrinth of Time (2005), a portrait on the composer as well as a view of the history of modernism in the 20th century. In 2005 Scheffer also finished a feature-length documentary on the Tea-Opera composed by Tan Dun, with Pierre Audi (Director) and Xiu Ying(libretto), Tea. This film had its world premiere in the Museum of Modern Art in New York. In 2006 a retrospective of his work and a Docu-Concert was exhibited in the Museum of Modern Art in New York.

A documentary on the Tehran Philharmonic Orchestra and its chief conductor, the Iranian composer Nader Mashayekhi with the title To Be And Not To Be was premiered at the doku-arts festival June 2009. A feature-length documentary on composer Edgard Varèse with the title The One All Alone was selected for the 2009 Venice Film Festival. In 2010 he finished Eastern Voices featuring a.o. Syrian musician Ibrahim Keivo and one of the finest voices in the world today the Aserbajanian singer Alim Qasimov. It won the German Record Critics' Award 2011 (Preis der deutschen Schallplattenkritik) for the DVD in Germany. A feature-length documentary on the Iranian composer Nader Mashayekhi, Gozaran / Time Passing. In 2011 Gozaran / Time Passing was selected for the international competition of the IDFA (International Documentary Film Festival Amsterdam). To celebrate the 100th birthday of John Cage in 2012, he made an experimental film called Ryoanji and re-edited the film material shot in 1987 with the title: How To Get Out Of The Cage (A year with John Cage). It won again the German Record Critics' Award 2012 (Preis der deutschen Schallplattenkritik). He is currently shooting a documentary on the Chinese composer Guo Wenjing and the Sichuan opera. In the future dramatic features based on Die Zauberflöte composed by Wolfgang Amadeus Mozart, the parallel lives of Gustav Mahler and Arnold Schoenberg, are planned.

== Retrospectives ==
- 2001 Holland Festival in Amsterdam, Netherlands
- 2006 MoMA in New York, United States
- 2007 Wien Modern Festival in Vienna, Austria
- 2008 Mumbai Film Festival in Mumbai, India and May Festival in Beijing, China
- 2011 Flaherty Seminar, Colgate University, Hamilton, New York, United States
- 2012 Istanbul Museum of Modern Art, Turkey and Soundtrack Cologne, Germany
