= Gerhard Schulz (musician) =

Austrian violinist (born 1951)

Gerhard Schulz (born 23 September 1951) is an Austrian violinist, conductor and academic.

== Life ==
Born in Linz, Schulz was born as the fourth child of a family of musicians and studied with Franz Samohyl at the University of Music and Performing Arts Vienna, Sándor Végh at the Robert Schumann Hochschule Düsseldorf and Shmuel Ashkenasi in the USA. He was involved in the founding of the Salzburg String Trio and the Schulz Ensemble and was first violinist of the Düsseldorf String Quartet.

Since 1980 Schulz has been Professor of Violin at the University of Music and Performing Arts Vienna and since 1993 he has also been Visiting scholar for chamber music at the Hochschule für Musik und Tanz Köln.

He was a member of the Alban Berg Quartet with whom he played for more than 30 years in the most important music centres of the world. After the Alban Berg Quartet had finished its concert activities in summer 2008, Schulz founded the piano quartet "Waldstein Ensemble".

He made his debut as a conductor in November 2009 with the Copenhagen Philharmonic and since then has dedicated himself to working with his students.

His brother was the flautist Wolfgang Schulz.
