= Werner Hink =

Austrian violinist and concertmaster (1943–2024)

- Born: 18 March 1943; Vienna, Nazi Germany
- Origin: Austrian
- Died: 21 May 2024 (aged 81) Vienna, Austria
- Occupations: Violinist; Concertmaster
- Instrument: Violin
- Formerly of: Vienna Philharmonic

Werner Hink (18 March 1943 – 21 May 2024) was an Austrian violinist and, for many years, Concertmaster of the State Opera Orchestra as well as a member of the Vienna Philharmonic.

== Early life ==
Hink received his first violin instruction at the age of six at the Conservatory of the City of Vienna with Luise Bilek. In 1962, he began his studies with Franz Samohyl at the then Vienna Music Academy and in the same year, he sat the diploma examination for concert violin, passing with distinction.

== Career ==
On 1 January 1964, Hink was hired as first violinist in the Vienna State Opera's orchestra. By November 1965, he had been accepted into the Association of the Vienna Philharmonic. After successful probationary work, he advanced in 1967 to Principal of the First Violinists' Group. In 1974, he was named to the Vienna Philharmonic Concertmaster's post, which he held until he retired in 2008. He played there with all the great conductors of his time, from Herbert von Karajan, Leonard Bernstein and Carlos Kleiber to GMJO founder and music director Claudio Abbado and many others.

=== Chamber music ===
Alongside his activity with the orchestra, Hink also devoted himself to chamber music. In 1964 he founded the Wiener Streichquartett, with whom he performed concerts throughout the world and made many records. Further, he enjoyed great international success with the Wiener Oktett, which he also founded, and with the piano trio with Jasminka Stančul and Fritz Dolezal. From 1974 onwards, Hink was a member of the Wiener Hofmusikkapelle, and from 1982 Professor for Violin at the Music and Arts University of the City of Vienna, succeeding his former teacher, Franz Samohyl.

=== Teaching ===
Beginning in 1982, Hink held a violin class at the Vienna Conservatory, where he trained many pupils and shared his musical knowledge.

From 1991 to 2010, Hink taught at the Pacific Music Festival (PMF) in Sapporo, Japan.

In 2009, Hink became violin teacher for the Gustav Mahler Jugendorchester (GMJO); he was leader of the string section and a member of the examining panel of judges, as well as a member of the orchestra's board of directors, thus holding for many years a key role in the GMJO's development and success.

== Death ==
Hink died on 21 May 2024 in Vienna after a long illness.

== Awards ==
- Title of Professor
- Austrian Decoration for Science and Art (Cross of Honour for Science and Art)
- Decoration of Honour for Services to the Republic of Austria (Great Badge of Honour)
