= Hilda Paredes =

Mexican composer (b. 1957)

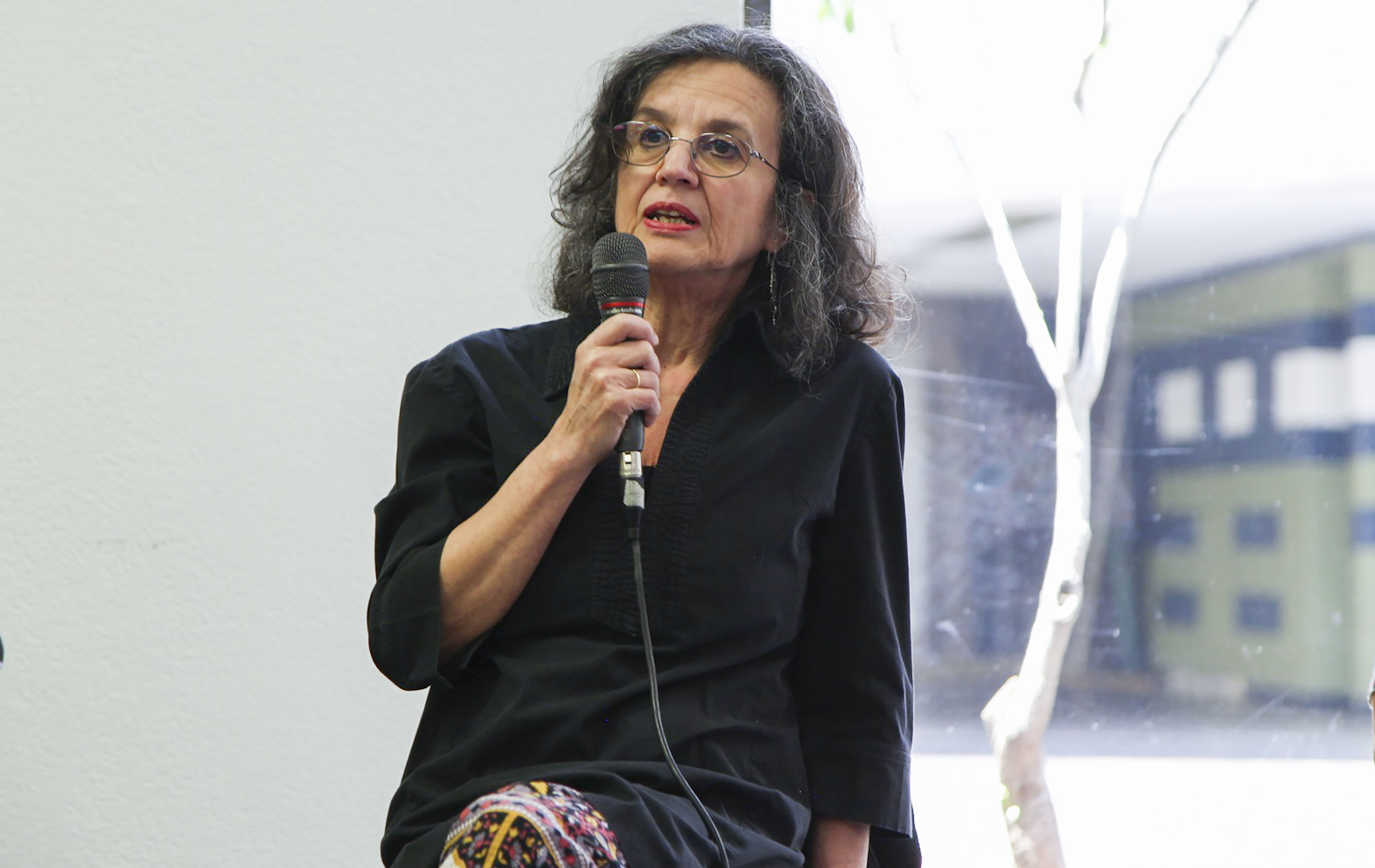
Paredes in 2024.

Hilda Paredes (born Tehuacan, Puebla, 1957) is one of Mexico's leading contemporary composers, and has received many prestigious awards for her work. She currently resides in London, and is married to the noted English violinist, Irvine Arditti.

== Biography ==
Paredes was born in Tehuacan, Puebla, Mexico, where she studied the piano and flute. At the age of 21, she went to London for college where she continued her studies and performances as a flutist. She regularly performed, and did arrangements for popular and classical music with several ensembles. During these times she was beginning to complete her own compositions.

As a student she attended master classes at Dartington Summer School, studied with Peter Maxwell Davies and Richard Rodney Bennett. After graduating at the Guildhall School of Music, she obtained her Master of Arts at City University in London and completed her PhD at Manchester University.

Her collaboration with choreographers led her to receive the Music for Dance Award from the Arts Council of Great Britain in 1988.

Not long after her collaboration with the Garden Venture Opera Project in Dartington, she completed her first chamber opera "The Seventh Seed", released by Mode Records.

Paredes continues to be involved in the musical life of her native country, teaching at the National University in Mexico City, as radio producer of new music, as well as collaborating with the Orchestra of Baja California arranging traditional Spanish and Mexican songs.

She has been recipient of important awards, such as the Arts Council of Great Britain fellowship for composers; the Rockefeller, Fund for Culture Mexico/USA and more recently the J.S. Guggenheim Fellowship in the USA.

Paredes continues to live in London, is a freelance composer, has taught composition and lectured at Manchester University, the University of San Diego California, as well as in Mexico, Spain, at Centre Acanthes in France and was the 2007 Darius Milhaud Visiting Professor at Mills College in the US.

Her second completed chamber opera "El Palacio Imaginado", commissioned by Musik der Jahrhunderte, English National Opera and the Festival of Arts and Ideas in New Haven, premiered with much acclaim in both sides of the Atlantic.

Hilda Paredes has been commissioned by soloists, ensembles and orchestras around the world. Her music has been performed by internationally renowned ensembles such as Lontano, London Sinfonietta, Ensemble Modern, Neue Vocalsolisten, Ensemble Signal, Ensemble Sospeso, and Arditti Quartet It has been widely performed at important international festivals, such as Huddersfield in the UK; Berlin Philharmonic and Eclat in Germany; Festival D'Automne, Cité de la Musique, Musica and Octobre en Normandie, in France; Wien Modern, in Austria; Akiyoshidai Music Festival, in Japan; Archipel, in Geneva; De Ijsbreker Chamber Music Festival, in Amsterdam; Warsaw Autumn, in Poland; Ultima, in Oslo; Melbourne Festival, in Australia; Festival of Arts and Ideas and June in Buffalo in the USA, Ars Musica in Bruxelles; Festival de Alicante, in Spain; Festival Internacional Cervantino in Mexico, amongst others.

A music theatre work titled "Harriet" or "Coded Messages: Scenes in the Life of Harriet Tubman", based on the life of the Afro-American freedom fighter Harriet Tubman, premiered in 2018 in Amsterdam and the Huddersfield Contemporary Music Festival.

In 2024 Paredes received an Ivor Novello Award nomination at The Ivors Classical Awards. "The Hearing Trumpet" picked up a nomination for Best Chamber Ensemble Composition.

== Discography ==
- Mode Records New York (60):The Seventh Seed, chamber opera in 3 acts, for 5 voices, string quartet and percussion. Permutaciones, for solo violin.
- Quindicim (QP 1067): Metmorfósis for guitar.
- Euram Record ( Euro092-3): Nana de la Luna for mezzo and piano.
- Luna Negra (CDLN22): Tres Piezas In Memoriam L.J. for ensemble (Flutes, 2 saxophonists, Mexican percussion, tabla, guitar and bass).
- Ediciones Pentagrama (PCD300): Globo, Luciérnagas, for mezzo and piano.
- Somm Recordings.UK (Salsa Nueva): Recordando a Celia, for piano.
- Mode Records New York(149): Uy U T’an for string quartet. Arditti Quartet.
- Can Silim Tun, for 4 voices and string quartet. Neue Vocalsolisten and Arditti Quartet. Ah Paaxo’ob for large ensemble. Ensemble Modern 2001.
- Cotidales, for piano quintet. Ian Pace and Arditti Quartet. 2001.
- Mode Records, New York (165): Uy U T’an. Arditti Quartet. Music from Mexico.

== Published works ==
- Agamemnon Takes a Bath (1989), a musical theatre piece for baritone, trombone, piano and actress, inspired by Aeschylus Agamemnon. Written for the Garden Venture project of Covent Garden, Royal Opera House. Libretto by Nicholas Till.
- Sonetos Eróticos, for soprano and ensemble(1989) Ediciones de Música Mexicana No. 88. Published in 1995.
- Chacdzidzib (1992), for piccolo. Biblio Música magazine no.6 (1993).
- Las Estrellas (2003), for piano. Spectrum 4 series by ABRSM.
- Recordando a Celia (2003), for piano. Published in the album Salsa Nueva by Boosey & Hawkes.
- Demente Cuerda (2004). For flute, oboe, clarinet, bassoon, horn, percussion string quintet and solo harpPublished by Institut de la Musica de Valencia.

University of York Music Press is now publishing:

- Permutaciones, for solo violin (1985)
- Homenaje a Remedios Varo (1995)
- Zuhuy Kak, for solo cello (1997)
- Tres Piezas In Memoriam L.J., for ensemble (Flutes, 2 saxophonists, Mexican percussion, tabla, guitar and bass)
- Ah Paaxo’ob, for large ensemble (2001)For flute (piccolo & alto flute), oboe (cor anglaise), Bb clarinet (Eb cl.), A clarinet(Bas cl.), bassoon, horn, trumpet in C, trombone, percussion (two players), celesta, harp, piano, three violins, two violas, two cellos and double bass.
- Cotidales, for piano and string quartet (2001)
- Corazón de Onix,(2005) For flute (+piccolo, alto and bass flute), Bb clarinet (+ Bss clarinet ), piano, violin, viola and cello.
- Recuerdos del Porvenir, (2005) For flute (+piccolo, alto), oboe (+ cor anglais) A clarinet (+ Eb clarinet), percussion, piano, violin, viola and cello.
- Páramo de voces, for piano and electronics (2006)
- Sobre un páramo sin voces, for piano (2006)
- Recordare, for symphony orchestra (2006)
- In Memoriam Thomas Kakuska, for solo violin (2006)

== Published articles ==
- The concept of time in the music of Elliott Carter, published and translated into Spanish. Pauta 42 (Mexico,1992)
- Conversación con Luciano Berio, published and translated (from Italian) into Spanish. Pauta 47-48 (Mexico,1993)
- The concept of time in Indian Music, published and translated into Spanish. Pauta 49 (Mexico,1994)
- Música para Cuerdas y Helicópteros, interview with Karlheinz Stockhausen. La Jornada Semanal (Mexico 1996)
- Verstilidad y desafío: London Sinfonietta y el Cuarteto Arditti, Doce Notas, Madrid January 2006

== Other activities ==
- 1991-96. New Music Radio producer of the weekly radio show Apariciones Sonoras del Siglo XX, (Radio UNAM, Mexico).
- 1992-93. Collaboration with the Orchestra of Baja California arranging and orchestrating traditional Mexican and Spanish songs, some of which have been released on CD.

== Awards ==
- 1988 : Music for Dance Award from Arts Council of Great Britain, granted for her work El Prestidigitador.
- 1989 : The Holst Foundation. Sponsored her Sonetos Eróticos.
- 1990 : Fellowship for Composers, for her work The Seventh Seed.
- 1993 : National Fund for Culture and Arts (FONCA), Mexico. Grant for En el Nombre del Padre.
- 1993-1996 : Fellowship for Creative Artists, Mexico.
- 1996 : Fund for Culture Mexico/USA. Sponsorship granted for the recording of The Seventh Seed.
- 1997-2000 : Fellowship for Creative Artists, Mexico.
- 2000 : Honorary member of the Sistema Nacional de Creadores, Mexico.
- 2001 : J.S. Guggenheim Fellowship, New York City.
- 2002 : Premio de la Unión de Cronistas de Teatro y Musica, México.
- 2003 : FONCA. Application for a project to record four pieces on the Mode label.
- 2006 : Sistema Nacional de Creadores, Mexico.
- 2019: Ivors Composers Award (UK): Best Stage Work for her opera Harriet, Scenes in the Life of Harriet Tubman.
