= Franz Samohyl =

Austrian violinist and concertmaster

Franz Samohyl (3 April 1912 – 14 June 1999) was an Austrian violinist, concertmaster of the Vienna State Opera and academic teacher.

== Life ==
Born in Vienna, Samohyl began his musical education in 1929 at the University of Music and Performing Arts Vienna with Julius Stwertka and continued these studies from 1931 after passing the Reifeprüfung. He attended master classes for chamber music with Franz Mairecker from 1933 to 1935 and followed private studies with Ernst Morawec and Arnold Rosé.

In 1930, he founded the Vienna Philharmonia Quartet, with which he travelled abroad to England, Hungary, Italy and Germany. Samohyl was concertmaster of the Vienna Chamber Orchestra from 1932 and of the orchestra of the Vienna Volksoper from 1934. From 1936, he was first violinist of the Vienna Philharmonic and the Vienna State Opera Orchestra, serving as its concertmaster in 1947.

From 1946 to 1982, he taught violin and viola at the Vienna Academy of Music and Performing Arts (now the University of Music and Performing Arts Vienna) and was dean of the Stringed Instruments Department from 1964 to 1972. In addition, he taught from 1964 to 1974 at the Mozarteum University Salzburg.

His students included Michael Frischenschlager, Nicolas Geremus, Werner Hink, Thomas Kakuska, Bijan Khadem-Missagh, Heinrich Koll, Rainer Küchl, Hiro Kurosaki, Gerhard Schulz, René Staar and Helmut Zehetmair.

== Awards ==
- 1946: Appointment as professor at the Akademie für Musik und darstellende Kunst
- 1965: Decoration of Honour for Services to the Republic of Austria
- 1966: Mozart Medal of the Mozartgemeinde Wien
- 1970: Österreichisches Ehrenkreuz für Wissenschaft und Kunst I. Klasse
- 1972: Silver Ehrenmedaille der Bundeshauptstadt Wien
- 1976: Großes Silbernes Ehrenzeichen für Verdienste um die Republik Österreich
- 1977: Nicolai Medal in Gold for outstanding services to the Vienna Philharmonic
- 1980: Silbernes Komturkreuz des Ehrenzeichens für Verdienste um das Bundesland Niederösterreich
- 1982: Order of the Sacred Treasure
- 1987: Goldenes Ehrenzeichen für Verdienste um das Land Wien
- 1988: Goldene Ehrenmedaille of the Universität Mozarteum Salzburg
