= Pellegrini Quartet =

String quartet

The Pellegrini Quartet is a string quartet named after its first violinist Antonio Pellegrini, founded in 1989 in Freiburg im Breisgau.

== Presentation ==
The ensemble juxtaposes the traditional and the experimental. Its repertoire includes works of the Renaissance, the Baroque, the Viennese Classic (Haydn, Mozart, Beethoven), the early modern (Alexander von Zemlinsky, Hanns Eisler), and composers of the second half of the 20th century (among others Morton Feldman, John Cage, Luigi Nono and Giacinto Scelsi). The Pellegrini Quartet has worked closely with contemporary composers Klaus Huber, Péter Eötvös, Salvatore Sciarrino and Walter Levin. The quartet has performed works by Adriana Hölszky ("Suspension bridges - string quartet to Schubert"), Erhard Grosskopf (12 pieces for String Quartet - String Quartet No. 4), Peter Kleindienst ("What Power Art") and Juliane Klein.

Their discography focuses on works by contemporary composers.

== Members ==
- Antonio Pellegrini - violin
- Thomas Hofer - violin
- Fabio Marano - viola
- Helmut Menzler - cello

=== Former member ===
- Charlotte Geselbracht – viola (until 1993)
