= Elisabeth Leonskaja =

Austrian pianist (born 1945)

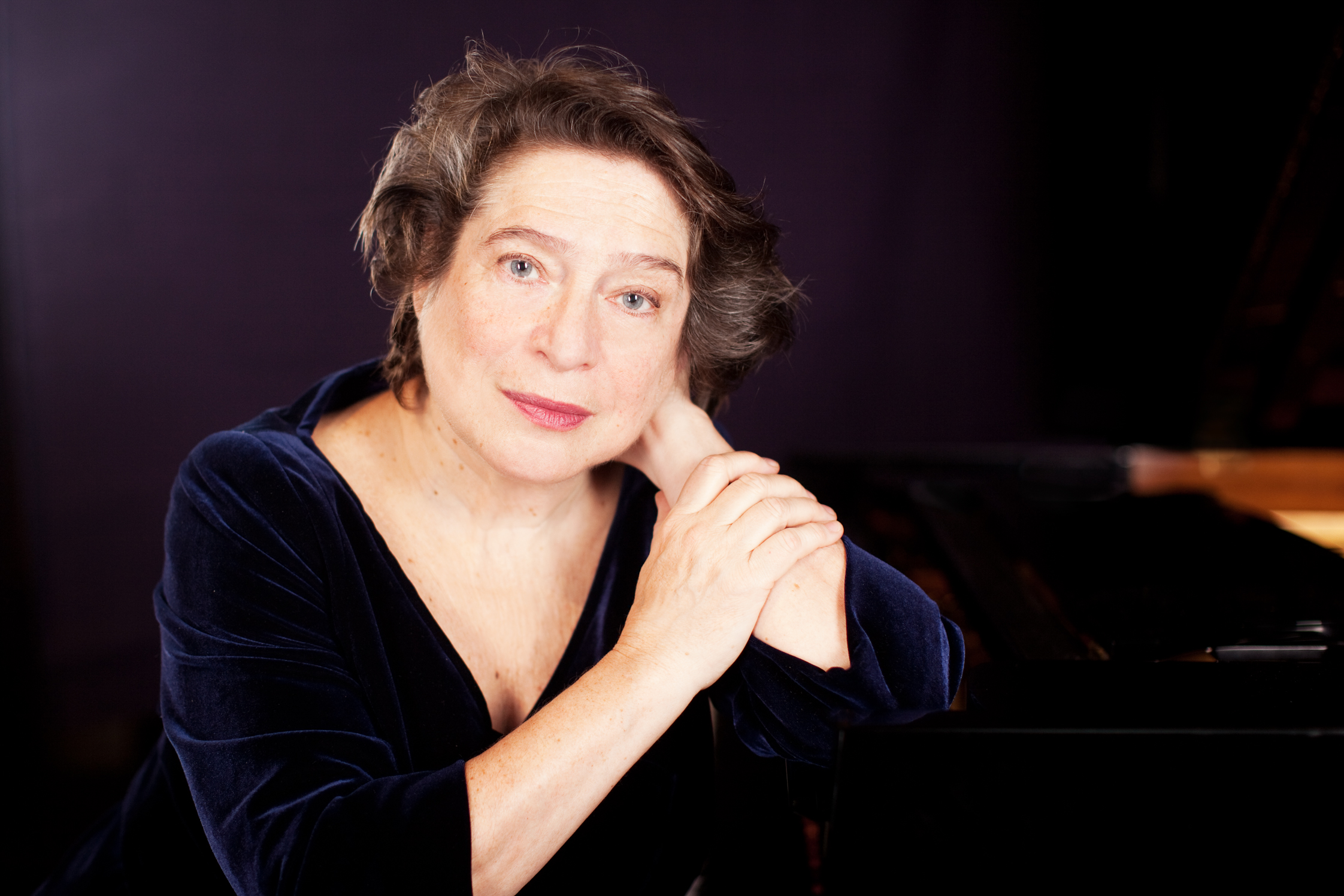
- Leonskaja in 2012
- Born: 23 November 1945 (age 80); Tbilisi, Georgian SSR, Soviet Union
- Occupation: Classical pianist
- Awards: Austrian Cross of Honour for Science and Art, 1st class
- Website: www.leonskaja.com

Elisabeth Leonskaja (born 23 November 1945) is an Austrian pianist. Born and trained in Tbilisi, Georgia she won the Enesco Competition in Bucharest in 1964 which made an international career possible. She then studied at the Moscow Conservatory where she met Sviatoslav Richter who performed with her and became a close friend. She has lived in Vienna since 1978. Besides the great piano concertos, she has focused on the late sonatas by Beethoven and Schubert.

== Life and career ==
Leonskaja was born in Tbilisi on 23 November 1945 to a family of Jewish and Polish origin. Tbilisi was then the capital of the Georgian Soviet Socialist Republic. Her parents had fled Odesa during World War II; her father was a jurist, her mother a musician. When Leonskaja was six and a half, her parents were able to buy her first upright piano. At age seven, she passed the entrance exam of one of Tbilisi's sixty music schools, where she studied with Rosalia Rojok und Emil Guzevitsch. She played her first concert with orchestra at age eleven, playing the first movement of Beethoven's Piano Concerto No. 1, and at age 13 she performed her first solo recital. She began an intense four-year period of study in secondary school with a new piano teacher from Kyiv at age 14. In 1964, Leonskaja won the Enesco International Piano Competition in Bucharest, with the composer and conductor Aram Khachaturian and the pianist Arthur Rubinstein among the judges.

In 1964, Leonskaja began studies in the Moscow Conservatory with Jacob Milstein. During her conservatory years, she was supported by Sviatoslav Richter who invited her to play duo concerts with him; she won prizes in the Long-Thibaud-Crespin Competition in Paris and the Queen Elisabeth Music Competition in Brussels.

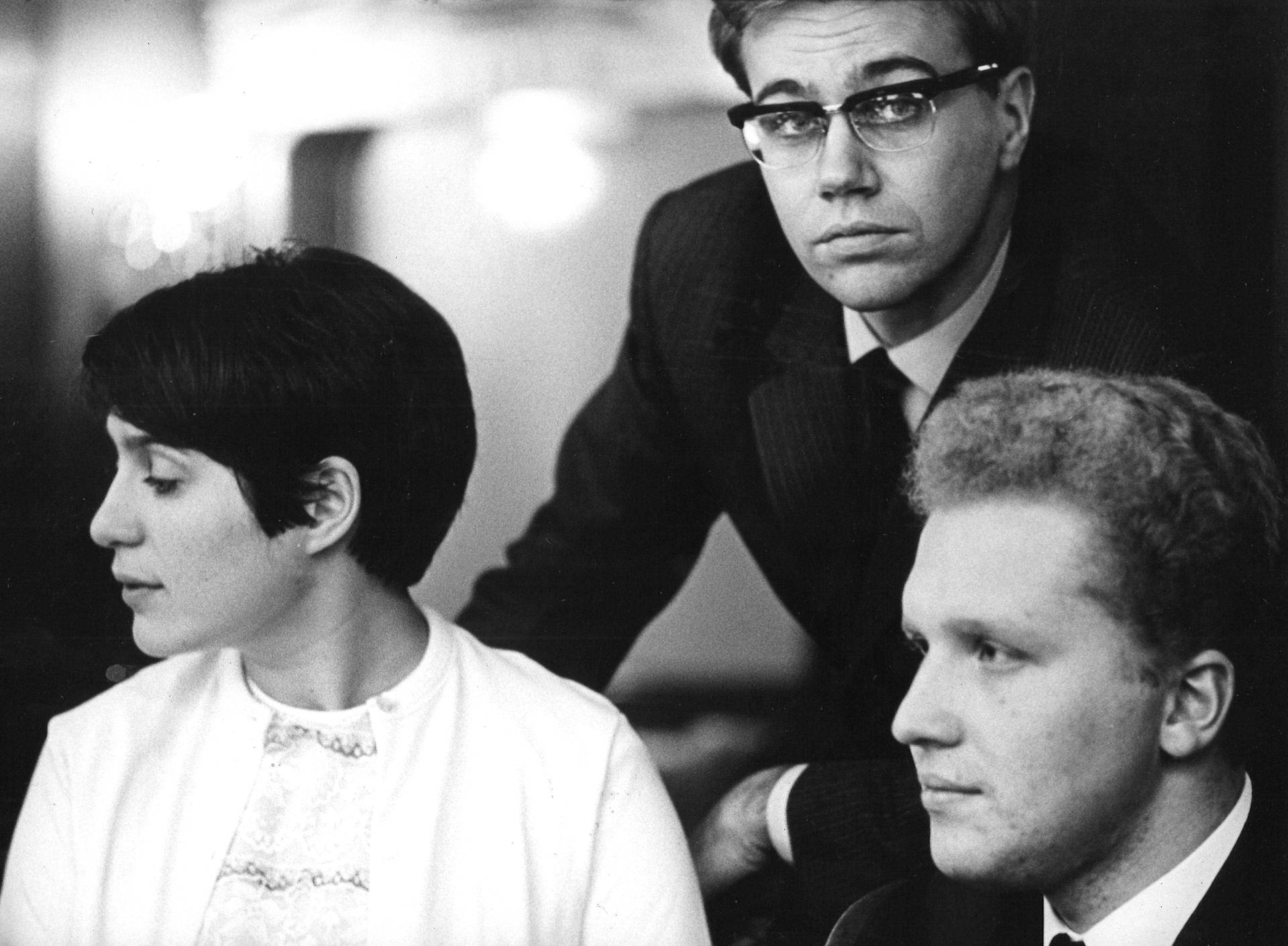
Leonskaja with the Finnish cellist Arto Noras and the Russian violinist Oleg Kagan in 1967

Leonskaja left the Soviet Union in 1978 and has since resided in Vienna. A performance at the 1979 Salzburg Festival won her international recognition. A notable recording of hers is of Edvard Grieg's arrangement for two pianos of Mozart's piano sonatas K. 545 and K. 533/494, in a duo with Sviatoslav Richter, with whom she built a close friendship and collaboration. She performed chamber music with string quartets such as the Alban Berg Quartett, the Belcea Quartet, Borodin Quartet, Artemis Quartet, and Jerusalem Quartet. She recorded many years for Teldec, now for German label MDG, and presently for several different labels including Warner, who have also re-released a number of recordings. She also gives many masterclasses.

In 2025 a scheduled concert in Eindhoven, Netherlands, was canceled. On 21 November 2025, the pianist performed in Moscow with Russian conductor Yuri Bashmet, who openly supports the Russian president Vladimir Putin. The concert was designated for Russian soldiers and their families. After the Ukrainian embassy contacted the venue the concert was canceled, citing a guideline by the trade association of theatres and concert halls, in response to the Russian and Belarusian aggression against Ukraine. This guideline asks members not to cooperate with individuals who support Russia and Belarus in this war.

== Personal life ==
Leonskaja was married for a short time to the violinist Oleg Kagan.

== Decorations and awards ==
- International Classical Music Awards, Lifetime Achievement (2020)
- Austrian Cross of Honour for Science and Art, 1st class (2005)
- Honorary citizen of Deutschlandsberg (1999)
