= Catalonia College of Music =

Music school in Barcelona

- Escola Superior de Música de Catalunya
- ESMUC in Barcelona
- Type: Public
- Established: 2001
- Location: Barcelona, Catalonia, Spain; 41.3982°N 2.1859°E
- Campus: L'Auditori
- Website: www.esmuc.cat
- [IPA: əsˈkɔlə supəɾiˈo ðə ˈmuzikə ðə kətəˈluɲə]

The Catalonia College of Music (Catalan: Escola Superior de Música de Catalunya, ESMUC; IPA: [əsˈkɔlə supəɾiˈo ðə ˈmuzikə ðə kətəˈluɲə]) is a higher education music school in Barcelona, Catalonia, Spain.

== Operations ==
The school is located at L'Auditori, a performing arts center inaugurated in 1999 which also houses three concert halls and a museum. The school has an international faculty and student body, and includes departments for classical and contemporary music, early music, jazz and popular music, traditional music, musicology and ethnomusicology, theory and composition, music education, music business, and sonology.

== Faculty ==
- Albert Guinovart, composition
- Agusti Charles, composition
- Mauricio Sotelo, composition
- Rosalia, musicology
- Uxia Martinez Botana, double bass
- Melissa Mercadal, current principal of the college.
- Kennedy Moretti, chamber music professor
- Gary Willis, electric bass
- Xavier Castillo, clarinet
- Lorenzo Coppola, clarinet
- Vera Martínez Mehner, violin
- Johan Duijck, choral conducting
- Lutz Köhler, orchestra conducting
- Pedro Memelsdorff, recorder
- Zoran Dukic, classical guitar+
- Ashan Pillai, viola
- Karst de Jong, theory, improvisation
- Béatrice Martin, harpsichord
- Joaquim Rabaseda, musicology
- Vicens Prats, flute
- Anna Costal, musicology
- Luca Chiantore, musicology
- Ignasi Terraza, jazz piano
- Rita Payés, jazz trombone

== Performing ensembles ==
The school has several performing ensembles, including:

- Orquestra i Cor d'Antiga de l'ESMUC (ESMUC early music ensemble and choir).
