= Günter Pichler =

Austrian violinist, teacher and conductor (1940–2026)

- Born: 9 September 1940; Kufstein, Reichsgau Tirol-Vorarlberg, Germany
- Died: 24 April 2026 (aged 85); Near Vienna, Austria
- Occupations: Classical violinist; Academic teacher; Conductor
- Years active: 1958–2026
- Website: www.guenterpichler.com

Günter Pichler (9 September 1940 – 24 April 2026) was an Austrian violinist, teacher and conductor. He was the first violinist in the Alban Berg Quartet from its founding in 1970 until its dissolution in 2008.

== Life and career ==
Pichler was born on 9 September 1940 in Kufstein, where he was also raised. He was accepted at the University of Music and Performing Arts, Vienna in 1955. He joined the Vienna Symphony as concertmaster under Wolfgang Sawallisch at the age of 18. At 21, he was made concertmaster by the Vienna Philharmonic thanks to a tie-breaking vote on his appointment by conductor Herbert von Karajan.

From 1963 to 2009 he taught at the University of Music and Performing Arts, Vienna as a professor, from 1993 to 2012 he was a professor at Cologne University of Music. In 2007 he was appointed head of the department for chamber music at the Escuela Superior de Musica Reina Sofia in Madrid. In addition he taught at several summer academies, including Pro Quartet Paris, Accademia Chighiana Siena and the Misqua Montreal.

Many of his students received international prizes, have become concert masters in important orchestras, or made a name for themselves with solo careers. Also among his students are musicians from many chamber music ensembles such as the Artemis, Aron, Belcea Quartet, Cuarteto Casals, Fauré, Eliot and Fibonacci quartets, the Trio con brio, das Atos-, Eggner-, Morgenstern trios and up and coming ensembles such as the Acies, Amaryllis, Cavaleri, Finzi, Piatti, Minetti, Schumann, Voce and van Kuijk quartet.

In 1970 Pichler founded the Alban Berg Quartet and was the first violin of this world famous string quartet until it disbanded in 2008. In addition to his work with the Alban Berg Quartet and as a teacher, Günter Pichler started a career as a conductor. He conducted many orchestras on concerts and on tour, including the Stuttgart Chamber Orchestra, Vienna and Israel Chamber Orchestras, the Ensemble Orchestral de Paris, the Orchestra della Toscana Firenze, I Pomeriggi Musicali di Milano, the Hallé Orchestra, the Orchestre nationale de Lille, and the Royal Philharmonic Orchestra of Flanders. In Japan he has conducted all the great symphony orchestras such as the Tokyo, Osaka, Sendai Philharmonic Orchestra and the NHK Symphony Orchestra. From 2001 until 2006 he was the principal guest conductor of the Orchestra Ensemble Kanazawa and went on to become its artistic advisor.

Pichler died in a traffic collision near Vienna on 24 April 2026, at the age of 85.

== Honours ==
- Recipient of the Mozartinterpretationspreis (1969)
- Decoration of Honour for Services to the Republic of Austria (1993)
- Recipient of the Tyrolean State Prize for the Fine Arts (2008)
