= Thomas Kakuska =

Austrian musician

Thomas Kakuska (born Vienna; 25 August 1940 – 4 July 2005) was an Austrian viola player, best known as the violist of the Alban Berg Quartett from 1981 until his death in Vienna in 2005.

Kakuska was a professor at the University of Music and Performing Arts, Vienna from 1971, and a visiting professor at the University of Cologne in Germany from 1993.

Following his death, Kakuska's close friend, the composer Hilda Paredes, wrote In Memoriam Thomas Kakuska for solo violin, which was given its premiere performance by her husband, Irvine Arditti, at a memorial concert in Vienna in 2006.
