= Konstantin Vassiliev =

German composer and guitarist

Konstantin Vassiliev (Russian: Константи́н Васильев (born 1970)) is a German composer and guitarist.

== Life ==
Born in Novoaltaysk, Vasilyev studied guitar at the Novosibirsk Conservatory with Arkadi Burchanow and composition with Sergei Tossin. After graduation he moved to Germany, where he continued his guitar studies with Reinbert Evers at the Hochschule für Musik Detmold, Münster, and his composition studies with Georg Haidu. In 1991, he organised the Chamber Ensemble Vassiliev for a combination of traditional European and Russian folk instruments, for which he wrote many compositions and arrangements.

Together with the singer and reciter Günter Gall, he is also dedicated to the rediscovery of the Jewish poet Mascha Kaléko, who was expelled by the Nazis.

Vasiliev is the winner of the composition competition at the Osnabrück guitar festival "Open Strings".

== Work ==
- Mountain rhapsody for guitar, A raphsody after a motif by Alban Berg.
- "Den Wolken nach ...".
- Konstantin Vassiliev: Sonata-Fantasy “Smoke of Love” after Shakespeare’s “Romeo and Juliet” und Sonata° auf der CD Sonatas von Roman Viazoskiy, CLCL 102
- Three Lyric Pieces
- Swan Princess
- Wanderer in Time
- Two Russian Pieces (Guitar duet)
- Due immagini animate (Guitar and harp)

Together with Roman Viaszoskiy:

- Fatum
- Forest Paintings: Nr. 1 The Old Oak
- Forest Paintings: Nr. 2 The First Snowdrops
- Forest Paintings: Nr. 3 Dance Of The Forest Ghosts
