= European Chamber Music Academy =

The European Chamber Music Academy (ECMA) was founded in 2004 on the initiative of Hatto Beyerle. Four conservatories and two music festivals, led by the Hochschule fur Musik und Theater Hannover, came together as founding members:

- the Fondazione Scuola di Musica di Fiesole (Italy),
- the Hochschule für Musik und Theater Hannover (Germany),
- the Universität für Musik und darstellende Kunst Vienna (Austria),
- the Hochschule für Musik und Theater Zurich (Switzerland),
- the Pablo Casals Festival in Prades (France)
- the Kuhmo Chamber Music Festival (Finland).

The ECMA students are young, professionally oriented string quartets and piano trios aiming to embark on a career as chamber musicians. The ECMA exists specifically to promote these careers through theoretical and practical tuition, as well as through concrete job preparation (marketing, coaching etc.).

== Tutors of note ==
- Shmuel Ashkenasi
- Norbert Brainin
- Anner Bylsma
- Heinrich Schiff
