= Cuarteto Casals =

Spanish string quartet

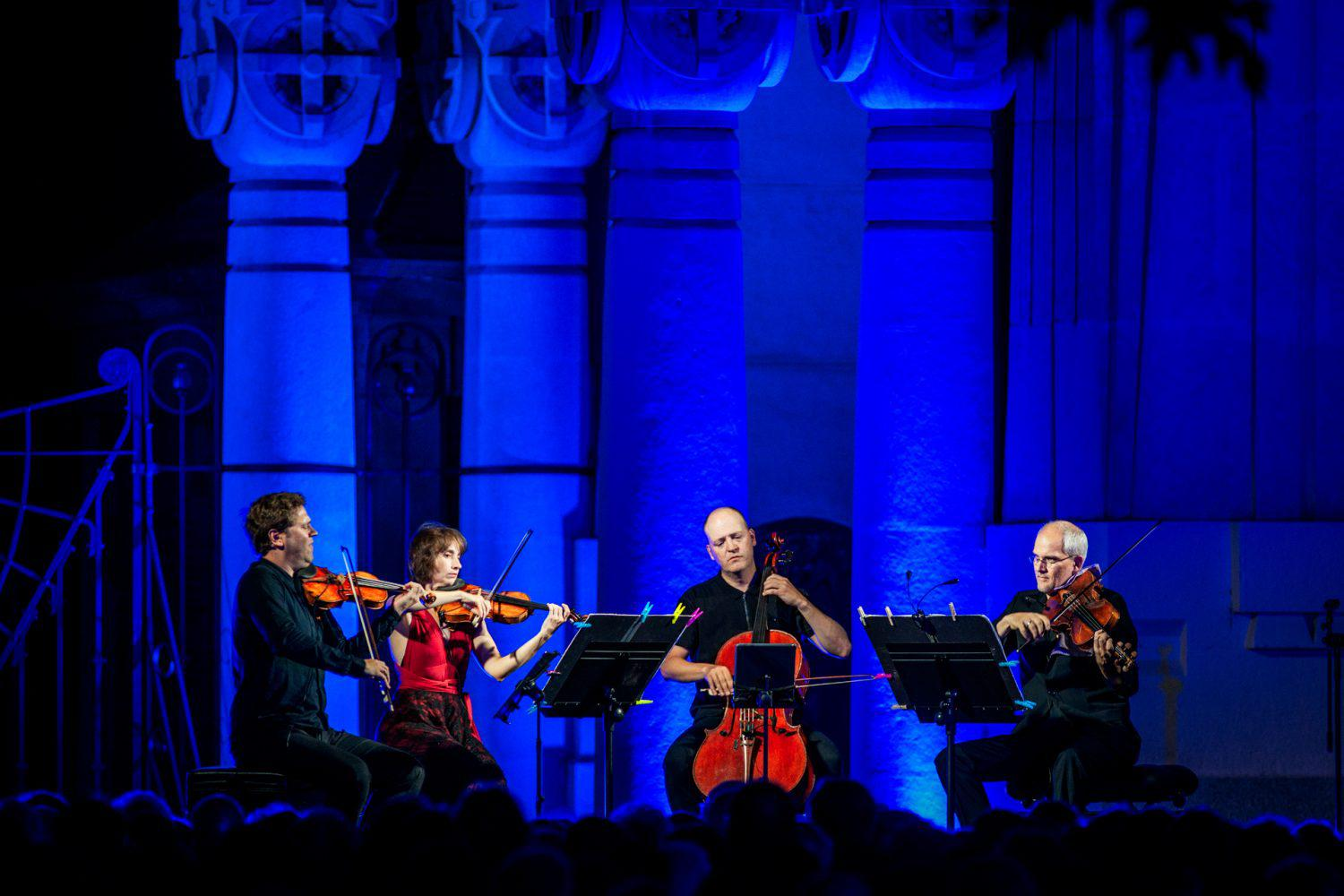
Cuarteto Casals (2018).

The Casals Quartet (Cuarteto Casals) is a Spanish string quartet based at l'Auditori in Barcelona, where all four members reside and teach at the Escola Superior de Musica de Catalunya.

== Formation ==
The Cuarteto Casals was founded in 1997 at the Reina Sofía School of Music in Madrid under the guidance of Professor Antonello Farulli. The ensemble continued its training in Barcelona with Walter Levin and Rainer Schmidt, and later pursued graduate studies in Cologne with the Alban Berg Quartet and Harald Schoneweg. The quartet takes its name from the renowned 20th-century cellist Pablo Casals. The group gained early international recognition after winning first prize at the 2000 London International String Quartet Competition, followed by a first prize at the 2002 International Brahms Competition in Hamburg. In 2006, the ensemble received Spain’s Premio Nacional de Música (National Music Award) in recognition of its rising international profile. A 2008 award from the Borletti-Buitoni Trust enabled the quartet to acquire a matching set of classical-period bows.

from 2024 the quartet comprised:

- Violin: Vera Martínez Mehner and Abel Tomàs.
- Viola: Cristina Cordero. Before the violist was Jonathan Brown
- Cello: Arnau Tomàs.

Unusually, the role of first and second violin can change from piece to piece during a concert.

== Appearances ==
Cuarteto Casals has appeared at the Wigmore Hall, Carnegie Hall, Musikverein Vienna, Philharmonie Cologne, Cité de la Musique in Paris, the Schubertiade in Schwarzenberg, Concertgebouw Amsterdam and the Philharmonie in Berlin. Reviewing their two 2012 Wigmore Hall recitals of Schubert's early string quartets, The Independent stated: "one couldn’t have wished for better advocates than the Cuarteto Casals, whose warm, full-toned playing was immaculate and poetic throughout."

The quartet has premiered works by Jordi Cervelló, David del Puerto and Jesús Rueda of Spain, collaborating with James MacMillan of Scotland, and György Kurtág of Hungary, and at the composer's request, has recorded Christian Lauba's quartet, Morphing.

The quartet has accompanied the King of Spain on diplomatic visits and performed on the unique collection of decorated Stradivarius instruments in the Royal Palace of Madrid.

== Discography ==
The quartet has made recordings for Harmonia Mundi, with repertoire ranging from lesser known Spanish composers Arriaga and Toldrá to Viennese classics Mozart, Haydn and Brahms, through 20th Century greats Bartók, Kurtág and Ligeti.

Reviewing their disc of Schubert's String Quartets D87 & D887, Fiona Maddocks, the Observer's music critic said that "the excellent Spanish ensemble bring supple radiance and flair to two works which span Schubert's brief career".

Video recordings of Cuarteto Casals' broadcast performances in Spain and Germany are available on YouTube.
