= Walter Levin =

German violinist

- Born: December 6, 1924; Berlin, Germany
- Died: August 4, 2017 (aged 92)
- Occupations: Classical violinist; Academic teacher
- Organizations: LaSalle Quartet

Walter Levin (December 6, 1924 – August 4, 2017) was the founder, first violinist, and guiding spirit of the LaSalle Quartet (active 1947–1987), which was known for its championing of contemporary composers, for its recordings of the Second Viennese School (Arnold Schoenberg, Alban Berg, and Anton Webern), as well as for its intellectually penetrating interpretations of the classical and romantic quartet repertory, in particular the late quartets of Beethoven. Levin was also an important pedagogue, having taught many of the world's leading string quartets, among them the Alban Berg Quartet and the Arditti Quartet; other prominent students include the conductor James Levine, the violinist Christian Tetzlaff and the pianist Stefan Litwin.

Levin was Professor of Music for 33 years at the College Conservatory of Music of the University of Cincinnati, where the LaSalle Quartet was quartet in residence, and subsequently taught chamber music at the Steans Institute of the Ravinia Festival in Chicago, at the Basel Academy of Music in Switzerland, and the Lübeck Academy of Music in Germany. In retirement, Levin and his wife Evi made their home in Chicago, Illinois.

== Berlin childhood ==
Walter Levin was born in Berlin, the son of Alfred Levin, a men's clothing manufacturer and a passionate music lover, and Erna Levin, née Zivi, a professionally trained pianist. The youngest of three children, Levin grew up in a household in which chamber music was played regularly. At the age of four he was given a violin, and began lessons with Jürgin Ronis, a student Carl Flesch, at the age of five. Levin's playing progressed rapidly under Ronis; he also studied piano with his sisters’ teacher, Marie Zweig. For his bar mitzvah at 13 Levin was given a complete library of string quartet music, ranging from Henry Purcell to Arnold Schönberg, and at least from that time on it was his ambition to make the string quartet his life's work.

As a child Levin experienced the golden age of musical culture that was Berlin in the Weimar Republic, hearing recitals by many of the greatest musicians of that era, including Yehudi Menuhin, Artur Schnabel, Edwin Fischer, Alexander Kipnis, and Erna Berger, and the Calvet Quartet, concerts by the Berlin Philharmonic, and opera productions at the Staatsoper, the Deutsches Oper, and the Kroll Oper, conducted, among others, by Leo Blech and Otto Klemperer. Opera and lieder recitals were decisive in impressing upon him early on the importance of singing and of the vocal literature for understanding the rhetoric of music and the technical means for its expression on the violin. Of particular importance were recordings by Yehudi Menuhin, Jascha Heifetz, and Arturo Toscanini, whose rhythmic elan, precision, and unsentimental verve were to remain models of the interpreter's art throughout his professional career.

After being harassed as a Jew by classmates following the Nazi take-over in 1933, Levin's parents enrolled him in the Zionist Theodor Herzl School, where the musicologist Willi Apel was among his teachers, an experience that he later recalled as akin to Thomas Mann's portrayal of the piano teacher Wendell Kretschmar in his novel Doktor Faustus. Levin's parents joined the Kulturbund Deutscher Juden, the Nazi organization for segregating Jewish musicians and performing artists, when it was founded in 1933, which was able to maintain a high level of concert life in Berlin despite the increasingly vigorous ban on Jewish performers. Levin's parents were slow to recognize the mortal threat that the Nazis represented: only in the aftermath of the Kristallnacht of 9–10 November 1938, did they undertake to emigrate, departing Berlin for Palestine in December, 1938, having forfeited most of their fortune to the infamous Reichsfluchtsteuer, the exit tax imposed on emigrating Jews by the Nazis.

== Palestine ==
The Levins settled in Tel Aviv, where Levin's uncle had established a men's clothing business. Through the efforts principally of the violinist Bronislaw Huberman, Palestine — and in particular, Tel Aviv — had become a place of refuge for many of the leading German and Eastern European Jewish musicians of the day. In Tel Aviv, Levin, now 14, played for Huberman, who arranged for him to study violin with Rudolf Bergmann (one of the four concertmasters of the recently established Palestine Symphony Orchestra); piano with Frank Pelleg (originally Pollack); and music theory with Paul Ben-Haim (originally Frankenburger). Levin also met the conductor Hermann Scherchen, who introduced him to the music of Arnold Schönberg. In Tel Aviv, Levin founded a string quartet that toured the kibbutzim; he also founded a student orchestra that gave concerts in Tel Aviv. Somewhat later, Levin occasionally substituted as a violinist in the Palestine Symphony Orchestra. In Palestine, Levin also reconnected with a childhood friend from Berlin, the pianist and composer Herbert Brün, who had emigrated in 1936 with a scholarship to attend the Jerusalem Conservatory. Through Brün, he met the composer Wolf Rosenberg and the writer Wolfgang Hildesheimer, who were to remain lifelong friends.

== Juilliard ==
Immediately after the war, Levin applied to the Juilliard School of Music in New York, where he began his academic studies in February, 1946. At Juilliard, he studied with the violinist Hans Letz, and then with Ivan Galamian, with whom he continued to study at Meadowmount, Galamian's summer school in upstate New York, until 1953. Juilliard's innovative president, the composer William Schuman, approved a major in string quartet for Levin, who founded a student quartet in 1946 that studied with the newly founded Juilliard String Quartet, and subsequently became known as the LaSalle Quartet. In New York, Levin was able to get permission to attend Toscanini's NBC Symphony Orchestra rehearsals, and to get tickets to Toscanini's broadcast concerts; he also made the acquaintance of violin dealer Rembert Wurlitzer, who later played a significant role in providing the LaSalle Quartet with a set of Stradivarius instruments, and then with a set of Amatis. In September 1948, while still at Juilliard, Levin met the violinist Henry Meyer, who had recently arrived in America from Paris following years of imprisonment in Nazi concentration camps. Meyer joined Levin's quartet, and remained its second violin throughout the quartet's forty-year career. Through Herbert Brün, who had come to Tanglewood on scholarship to study composition with Aaron Copland in the summer of 1948, Levin met the pianist Evi Markov, whose family had emigrated to America in November 1940. The two were married a year later in Colorado Springs, and Evi, who had also gone to business school, became the business manager of the LaSalle Quartet.

== The LaSalle Quartet ==
Levin and his LaSalle Quartet graduated from Juilliard in 1949, and obtained an appointment as quartet in residence at Colorado College in Colorado Springs. In the summer preceding the start of that appointment, they were joined by violist Peter Kamnitzer, whom they had known from Juilliard, and who remained with the quartet until its retirement in 1987. At Colorado College, the quartet taught, gave concerts, and undertook a series of children's concerts which was to continue throughout their career. It was Levin's lifelong conviction that classical musicians have a responsibility to develop the next generation of classical music lovers, as well as the younger generation of performers.

After four years at Colorado College, the quartet was invited to Cincinnati to become quartet in residence at the Cincinnati College of Music, which soon thereafter merged with the Cincinnati Conservatory, and subsequently became a unit of the University of Cincinnati. In Cincinnati, Levin, Meyer, and Kamnitzer were joined by cellist Jack Kirstein, who stayed with the quartet for twenty years before retiring in 1975, after which they were joined by Lee Fiser, a student of Lynn Harrell. Fiser remained the cellist of the LaSalle Quartet until their retirement in 1987.

The quartet toured internationally, beginning with a tour of Europe in 1954. Its participation in the famous Darmstadt Summer Courses for New Music in the 1950s led to a series of commissions to contemporary composers, most notably György Ligeti and Luigi Nono, and also to many world premieres, including the quartets by Krzysztof Penderecki and Witold Lutosławski.

In 1971, the quartet became famous, especially in the United States, as a result of the unexpected success of its recording for Deutsche Grammophon of the complete string quartet music of the chief representatives of the Second Viennese School: Arnold Schönberg, Alban Berg, and Anton Webern. This set, and the LaSalle's subsequent recordings of the late quartets of Beethoven, have been continuously in print since their first release.

The quartet also recorded a significant part of its contemporary music repertory for Deutsche Grammophon, and its recordings of the quartets by Alexander Zemlinksky contributed significantly to the renaissance of interest in his operatic, symphonic, and chamber music.

== Teaching ==
Throughout his career Levin was a dedicated teacher of young musicians: he had begun teaching during his years in Palestine, and continued during his four years at Juilliard in New York. He was subsequently the prime mover in the LaSalle Quartet's ongoing series of children's concerts, in which he and the quartet introduced even elementary school children to the string quartet repertory and gave them a basic exposure to the give and take of chamber music. The LaSalle Quartet itself was always a quartet in residence, first at Colorado College in Colorado Springs, 1949–1953, and then at College Conservatory Music in Cincinnati, 1953–1987.

In addition to giving four concerts at the College Conservatory each year, Levin and the other members of the quartet not only taught their instruments individually, but also taught young quartets under a scholarship program initiated by Levin, among them the Alban Berg, Artis, Brahms, Buchberger, Pražák, and Vogler Quartets.

Following the LaSalle Quartet's retirement in 1987, Levin continued to teach young quartets, at the College Conservatory through 1989, at the Steans Institute at Ravinia, at the Basel Academy of Music, and at the Lübeck Academy of Music; these quartets have included the Alma, Amaryllis, Arco Iris, Ardeo, Ariel, Arpeggione, Artemis, Basler, Benaïm, Bennewitz, Casals, Castagneri, Debussy, Doric, Gémeaux, Harmony-Shanghai, Kuss, Lotus, Minguet, Pavel Haas, Pellegrini, Ponche, Prinse, Prisma, Quiroga, Sonos, Viktor Ullmann, Zemlinsky, and Zwiebel string quartets.

Many of Levin's violin students hold positions in major orchestras around the world; his most prominent violin student is the virtuoso soloist, chamber musician, and conductor Christian Tetzlaff. Violinists and string quartet players are not Levin's only students: the pianist Stefan Litwin is also his student, as is in many respects the Percussion Group Cincinnati. Levin's most famous student, however, is the pianist and conductor James Levine, who began lessons with Levin in Cincinnati at the age of ten in 1953 and continued his studies with Levin until entering Juilliard in 1961.

== Philosophy ==
Levin's philosophy of interpretation can be summarized as a search to know, by a combination of historical research and structural analysis, a composer's exact intentions, and to realize those intentions in the performance of works that have influenced the subsequent course of musical history and that can reveal new aspects for the present when considered from the standpoint of the most advanced contemporary music. As a result, it was in Levin's view as essential to know and perform the most difficult works of the present as it is to perform the works of the past: only through an intellectually rigorous dialectic of past and present can any work be brought to life in performance.

Levin insisted that the details of interpretation of any given work can only be understood in relation to a larger grasp of the work as a whole, while the work as a whole can only be understood via a sustained grappling with its details. In this sophisticated hermeneutic of history and structure, Levin's primary aim was to convey in its full intensity the rhetoric of the music: its meaning, and for an understanding of this he turns to sources of musical rhetoric primarily in vocal music: opera, choral works, and song.

In pursuit of these ideals, Levin insisted on the importance of studying all available sources, the history of interpretive practice, and the need of chamber ensembles to learn their repertory playing from scores rather than parts, not only so that each may see what the others are playing, but so that all may develop the crucial sense of the whole and its implicit unity, to which every aspect of the interpretation and performance must contribute.
