= Valentin Erben =

Austrian cellist

Valentin Erben (born 1945 in Vienna) is an Austrian cellist.

== Life ==
Erben studied with Walter Reichardt in Munich, Tobias Kühne in Vienna and André Navarra in Paris. In 1970, he became a founding member of the Alban Berg Quartett, with which he played for 38 years. He has taught cello at the Hochschule für Musik Vienna since 1972. He also teaches at the University of Cologne, the Chigiana Academy in Siena, and ProQuartet in Paris.

He won the International Cello Competition in Vienna and the ARD International Music Competition in Munich.

He plays an instrument made by Matteo Goffriller in 1722 which previously belonged to French cellist Pierre Fournier.
