= Graeme Jennings (violinist) =

Australian classical violinist (born 1968)

Graeme Lucian Phillip Jennings
- Born: 1968 (age 57–58)
- Occupations: Classical violinist; music teacher
- Instrument: Violin
- Education: Queensland Conservatorium; San Francisco Conservatory
- Employer: Queensland Conservatorium Griffith University

Graeme Lucian Phillip Jennings (born 1968) is an Australian classical violinist and music educator.

He has performed with the Elision Ensemble and Arditti Quartet. Jennings' 2005 performance of Brian Ferneyhough's violin concertante Terrain, was described as "transfixing either as a display of fiddling pyrotechnics, or as an exercise in mind-bending mathematics, or as a lovingly crafted exploration of gestures". In 2017, he performed Elliot Carter's Duo for Violin and Piano in Hobart, a piece so difficult Jennings was only one of a handful of violinists in the world who could play it.
