= Arditti Quartet =

British string quartet

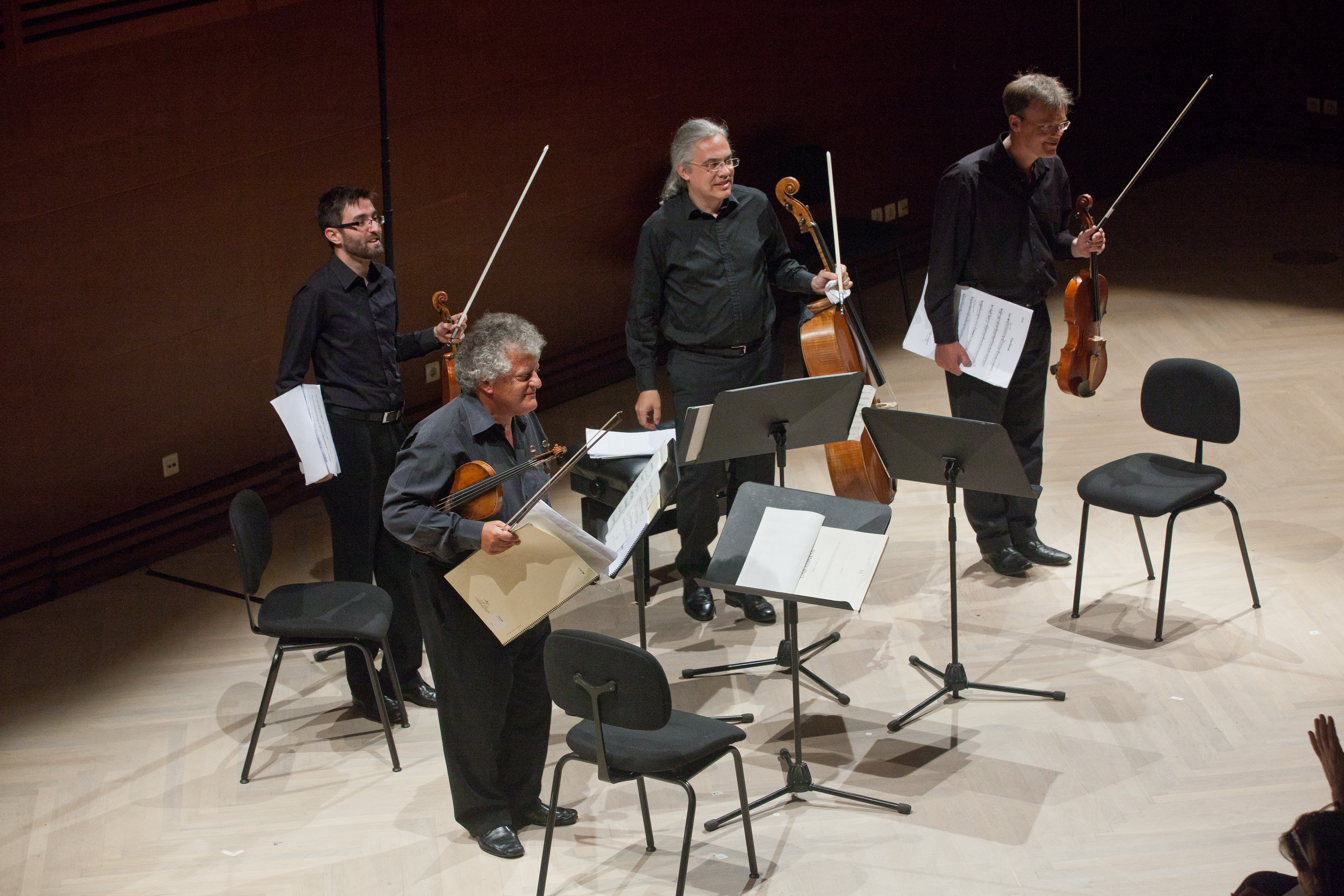
- Arditti Quartet

Background information
- Origin: London
- Years active: 1974–present
- Members: Irvine Arditti; Ralf Ehlers; Lucas Fels; Ashot Sarkissjan
- Past members: See text
- Website: ardittiquartet.com

The Arditti Quartet is a string quartet founded in 1974 and led by British violinist Irvine Arditti through many changes in membership. Internationally recognized in contemporary classical music, they are noted for precision in demanding repertoire. Many composers have written for the Quartet, which often rehearses with them. The ensemble has performed worldwide, produced the largest discography of its kind, and in 1999 became the first group to receive the Ernst von Siemens Music Prize.

== Repertoire ==
The Arditti Quartet is dedicated to contemporary and 20th-century classical chamber music, with most of their repertoire drawn from the past fifty years and some of it written for the ensemble. Unlike the Kronos Quartet, their repertoire includes little crossover music. They are considered authoritative interpreters of some late 20th-century music and are noted for mastering complex works with precision. Norwegian composer Sven Lyder Kahrs has called them the "Rolls-Royce" of quartets, praising their command of new music.

Their repertoire spans composers such as Hans Abrahamsen, Thomas Adès, Luciano Berio, John Cage, Elliott Carter, Franco Donatoni, Pascal Dusapin, Henri Dutilleux, Brian Ferneyhough, Morton Feldman, Georg Friedrich Haas, György Kurtág, Helmut Lachenmann, György Ligeti, Witold Lutosławski, Wolfgang Rihm, Giacinto Scelsi, and Iannis Xenakis. Ligeti's second quartet and Xenakis's Tetras are works they have performed hundreds of times. They prefer to work closely with composers, sometimes influencing revisions during rehearsal, and view this collaboration as a way of serving new music and supporting younger or lesser-known figures.

They have also performed minimal music like Gavin Bryars' first quartet (written for them) and Philip Glass's Mishima, as well as works with electronics (e.g., York Holler's Antiphon, Kaija Saariaho's Nymphea, Roger Reynolds' Ariadne's Thread). While their debut concert featured only contemporary music in the strict sense, they included music of the Second Viennese School from their second year, later adding that of Bartók and other early 20th-century composers, and in the 1980s even Beethoven's Grosse Fuge.

== History ==
The Quartet was founded in 1974 by Irvine Arditti with Levine Andrade, Lennox Mackenzie and John Senter while all were students at the Royal Academy of Music. They modeled themselves on the La Salle Quartet of the United States, focused at first on the LaSalle repertoire, with the aim of supporting composers, playing the pieces as they want them played. Very soon the size of their repertoire went far beyond what the LaSalle achieved or in fact any other group in the history of classical music.

Arditti was born in London in 1953, and began his studies in violin and composition at the Royal Academy at the age of sixteen. Arditti won prizes for violin and composition, but decided he was a better violinist and stopped composing. The focus of the quartet on new music is due to Arditti's interest in it, which began with composing in his childhood and hearing music by Stockhausen, Ligeti and others of the avant garde of the 1960s. It was later that Ardittí became aware of the work of the LaSalle Quartet. In his last year at the Royal Academy of Music the Quartet was founded, and it continued during the time he was in the London Symphony Orchestra from 1976 to 1980, after which he left the Orchestra in order to dedicate himself full-time to the quartet.

The Quartet's first concert was in March 1974, with the works of Krzysztof Penderecki, who was at the Royal Academy to receive an honorary degree. This gave the group a chance to collaborate with the composer, something they continue to do with composers ever since. The quartet was named after Arditti because they needed a name in 24 hours, so they used his with the idea that it would be temporary, but the name stuck.

In their early years, before the end of the 1970s, the ensemble performed and recorded all the quartets of Hans Werner Henze and György Ligeti. They also began performing live on BBC. They commissioned their first piece in 1977, Jonathan Harvey's String Quartet No. 1.

The group continued to have success touring and recording in Europe but it was not until the success of Kronos Quartet that the ensemble came to the attention of US and Canadian audiences, with a tour in the late 1980s.

The founder, Irvine Arditti, is the only member who has played throughout the entirety of the quartet's existence, stretching over more than four decades.

For the 40th anniversary of the quartet in 2014, one of the celebrations in London included a three-concert-in-one-day event, with works by fifteen different composers with whom their leader Arditti has been particularly closely associated, as well as the world premiere or several new works.

== Recognition ==
The Quartet has a worldwide reputation as a leader for its interpretation of 20th century and contemporary new music, receiving extensive critical praise. They have been noted for their "...astonishing virtuosity and their willingness to extend the boundaries of what can be expected of a string quartet..." However, they have also been criticized as being severe, dry and intellectual with a "kind of high-flown rhetoric that almost seemed designed to show that 'new music' can live in a pretentiously self-absorbed world."

Awards include the Deutsche Schallplatten Preis on various occasions, the Gramophone Award for best recording of contemporary music in 1999, 2002 and 2018, the Coup de Coeur Prize and Grand Prix from the Academie Charles Cros in 2004 and the Ernst von Siemens Music Prize for lifetime achievement in 1999. They are the first and only group to date to receive the Siemens Foundation prize.

== Concerts and recordings ==
The Quartet is highly active throughout the year, mostly with performing and recording and premiering between twenty and fifty new works each year, taking time off only during the summer and Christmas vacations. They have performed hundreds of new works and commissions, with a discography of over 200 CDs on over twenty labels, by far the longest contemporary discography of any string quartet. A complete archive of the quartet's work is located at the Sacher Foundation in Basel, Switzerland.

Most of their performances are in concert halls and festivals within Europe, but they are known all over the world and have performed extensively in the US, Canada, Korea, South America, Japan and Mexico. One special piece which Arditti himself arranged the commission involved not playing in a concert hall. This was Stockhausen's Helicopter quartet, which required each member to perform his part in his own helicopter, and be relayed to the ground electronically where the audience was listening in a concert hall.

=== Discography ===
- Hans Abrahamsen: String Quartets 1–4 (CD Winter & Winter 910 242-2, released 2017)
- Harrison Birtwistle: The Tree of Strings, 9 Movements (CD: AEON AECD1217, released 2012)
- John Cage: Music for Four, 30 Pieces (CD: MODE Mode17, released 1989)
- John Cage: String Quartet in four parts, Four (CD: MODE Mode27, released 1992)
- Elliott Carter: String Quartets 1–4, Elegy (CD: Et Cetera KTC 1065-66, released 1989)
- Pascal Dusapin: String Quartets 1–5, Musique Fugitive (CD: AEON AECD0983, released 2012)
- Pascal Dusapin: String Quartets 6–7 (Quartet 6 Hinterland for quartet and orchestra) |AEON AECD1753, released 2017)
- Brian Ferneyhough: String Quartet Sonatas (1), 2–6, Adagissimo, Dum Transissets I-IV, Exordium, string trio's 1994 + 1995 AEON AECD1335, released 2017)
- Roberto Gerhard: String Quartets 1–2, Chaconne (CD: AEON AECD1225, released 2010)
- Jonathan Harvey: String Quartets 1–4, String trio (CD: AEON AECD0975, released 2009)
- Hans Werner Henze: String Quartets 1–5 (CD: WERGO WER 60114/ 15-50, released 1986)
- Toshio Hosokawa: String Quartets Urbilder, Landscape I, Silent flowers, Floral fairy, Blossoming, Kalligraphie (CD: WERGO WER 6761 2, released 2013)
- Toshio Hosokawa: Quintets, Fragmente II with recorder, Landscape II with harp, Landscape V with sho + solos elegy for violin, threnody for viola, chant for cello, (CD: WERGO WER 6769 2, released 2014)
- Helmut Lachenmann: String Quartets 1, 2 and 3 (CD: KAIROS Kairos 0012662, released 2011)
- György Ligeti: String Quartets 1, 2 (CD: WERGO WER 60079-50, released 1988)
- György Ligeti: String Quartets 1, 2, 2 Movements, Ballad und tanz, Hyllning (CD: SONY SK62306, released 1996)
- Conlon Nancarrow: String Quartets 1, 3, Studie 15, 31, 33, 34, Toccata (CD: WERGO WER 6696 2, released 2007)
- Hilda Paredes: Cuerdos del Destino, Canciones Lunáticos, Papalote, In Memoriam Thomas Kakuska (CD: AEON AECD0975, released 2015)
- Karl Aage Rasmussen: Solos and Shadows; Surrounded by Scales / Bent Sørensen: Alman; Adieu; Angels' Music (CD Dacapo 9003/9003b, released 1990)
- Arnold Schoenberg: String Quartets I–IV (CD: Montaigne/naive MO782024, released 1994)
- Arnold Schoenberg: Chamber Music (CD: Montaigne/naive MO782025, released 1995)
- Karlheinz Stockhausen: Helikopter Quartett (CD: Stockhausen Verlag CD 53A + B, released 1999)
- Anton Webern: complete string trios and quartets (CD: Montaigne/naive MO782136, released 1991)
- Iannis Xenakis: complete string chamber music (CD: Montaigne/naive MO782005, released 1992)
- John Zorn Myth and Mythopoeia (Tzadik, released 2014)

== Other activities ==
Members of the group regularly conduct master classes in Europe, the United States and Canada, for performers and composers, generally in a guest capacity. From 1982 to 1996, they worked with young composers at the Darmstadt International Summer Courses for New Music. They also encourage younger quartets interested in new music.

In 2013, they collaborated with the composer Brian Ferneyhough on a documentary called Climbing a Mountain which is about how the group prepares for the presentation of new pieces. It was created particularly for composers and music students to help them understand the rehearsal process.

== Members ==
- Irvine Arditti (violin), 1974–
- Ashot Sarkissjan (violin), 2005–
- Ralf Ehlers (viola), 2003–
- Lucas Fels (cello), 2006–

=== Past members ===
Second violin
Lennox Mackenzie, 1974–1983
Alexander Bălănescu, 1983–1985
David Alberman, 1985–1994
Graeme Jennings, 1994–2005
Viola
Levine Andrade, 1974–1990 († 1954–2018)
Garth Knox, 1990–1997
Dov Scheindlin, 1997–2002
Cello
John Senter, 1974–1976
Helen Liebmann, 1976–1977
Rohan de Saram, 1977–2005 († 1939–2024)
