= LaSalle Quartet =

String quartet

- Origin: Manhattan, NY
- Genre: Classical
- Occupation: Chamber ensemble
- Years active: 1946–1987
- Label: Deutsche Grammophon Gesellschaft
- Past members: Walter Levin, 1st violin; Henry Meyer, 2nd violin; Max Felde, viola (1946-49); Peter Kamnitzer, viola (1949-87); Richard Kapuscinski, cello (1946-55); Jack Kirstein, cello (1955-75); Lee Fiser, cello (1975-87)

The LaSalle Quartet was a string quartet active from 1946 to 1987. It was founded by first violinist Walter Levin. The LaSalle's name is attributed to an apartment on LaSalle Street in Manhattan, where some of its members lived during the quartet's inception. The quartet played on a donated set of Amati instruments.

The LaSalle Quartet was best known for its espousal of the Second Viennese School of Schoenberg, Berg and Webern, and of the European modernists who derived from that tradition, though they also performed standard classical and romantic literature. The Quartet gave the premiere of Witold Lutosławski's String Quartet in Stockholm in 1965. György Ligeti dedicated his Second String Quartet to the group, and they premiered it in Baden-Baden on December 14, 1969. The quartet has been credited with the "Zemlinsky Renaissance," as Zemlinsky remained largely unknown until they performed his works. The quartet won the Deutscher Schallplattenpreis for their recording of his four string quartets.

They also recorded Beethoven's late quartets, Mendelssohn's first two quartets, Schubert's String Quintet D956 with Lynn Harrell, Brahms' first two quartets, and the Ravel and Debussy quartets.

The LaSalle Quartet was the quartet-in-residence at the University of Cincinnati – College-Conservatory of Music, and cellist Lee Fiser taught there until his retirement in 2017.

== Members ==
- Walter Levin - first violin | Lived and worked for many years in Basel, Switzerland, then moved to a senior citizens' home in Chicago. He died in August 2017;
- Henry Meyer - second violin | Founding member of LaSalle Quartet, became a master teacher, presenting classes throughout the world, and serving as Professor of Violin at the College-Conservatory of Music, Cincinnati for over 25 years. He was the first recipient of the Lifetime Achievement Award of the American Classical Music Hall of Fame. In 1993, Meyer received the A.B. (Dolly) Cohen Award for Excellence in Teaching at the University of Cincinnati. He died in December 2006.;
- Max Felde - viola | He continued his career in New York City, later moving to the west coast of Canada to raise his family with violinist Aurora Felde, his musical career as assistant principal viola of the CBC Chamber Orchestra, violist in the Vancouver Symphony Orchestra for over 25 years, in addition to being an accomplished classical instrument maker. He died in 2005.;
- Peter Kamnitzer - viola | Quartet member from 1949 to 1987. Died in Israel on February 23, 2016, at the age of 93. He was survived by his wife.;
- Richard Kapuscinski - cello | Quartet member from 1949 to 1955. He became Cleveland Orchestra member, Born in Milwaukee, he lived in Oberlin since 1967. A 1941 graduate of Curtis Music Institute, Philadelphia, Kapuscinski retired in 1987 after 20 years as professor of cello at Oberlin College Conservatory of Music. Following his retirement from Oberlin, he taught cello and chamber music in London and at University of South Carolina, Columbia S.C. When he returned to Oberlin, he coached chamber music. For 37 years he coached cello and chamber music at Tanglewood Summer Music Program, Lenox, Mass. Kapuscinski was a member of the Cleveland Orchestra, Boston Symphony, Baltimore Symphony, LaSalle String Quartet and Croydon Trio. He was the recipient of the Robert W. Wheeler Chair For Professor Performance at OC and the Distinguished Teachers Award from American String Teachers Association of which he was a member. Died at the age of 69 in Oberlin.
- Jack Kirstein - cello | Quartet member from 1955 to 1975, died in August 1996.
- Lee Fiser - cello | Joined the Quartet in 1975. Lee Fiser studied with Lynn Harrell at the Cleveland Institute of Music and Leslie Parnas at Boston University. He is a former member of Cleveland Concert Associates and Cincinnati Symphony. As cellist for the LaSalle Quartet from 1975 until the Quartet's retirement in 1988, he has performed in over forty international concert tours and has given chamber music performances with James Levine, Lynn Harrell, Benita Valente, Richard Goode, Paula Robison and the Tokyo String Quartet. Fiser has appeared at European festivals, chamber music master classes and workshops. Recording exclusively for Deutsche Grammophone, he released Beethoven: The Late Quartets, which won the Grand Prix du Disque in Paris and several other international prizes. He is also a juror at international chamber music competitions.

== Personnel ==
name	dates	role	period
Walter Levin	(*Berlin, 1924 – †2017)	1st violin (founder & leader)	1946-87
Henry Meyer	(*Dresden, 1923 – †2006)	2nd violin (founder)	1948-87
Max Felde	(*1917 – †2005)	viola (founder)	1946-49
Peter Kamnitzer	(*Berlin, 1922 – †2016)	viola	1949-87
Richard Kapuscinski	(*Milwaukee, 1921 – †Oberlin, 1991)	cello	1946-55
Jack Kirstein	(*1921 – †1996)	cello	1955-75
Lee Fiser	(*1947 – †....)	cello	1975-87
