= Irvine Arditti =

British violinist

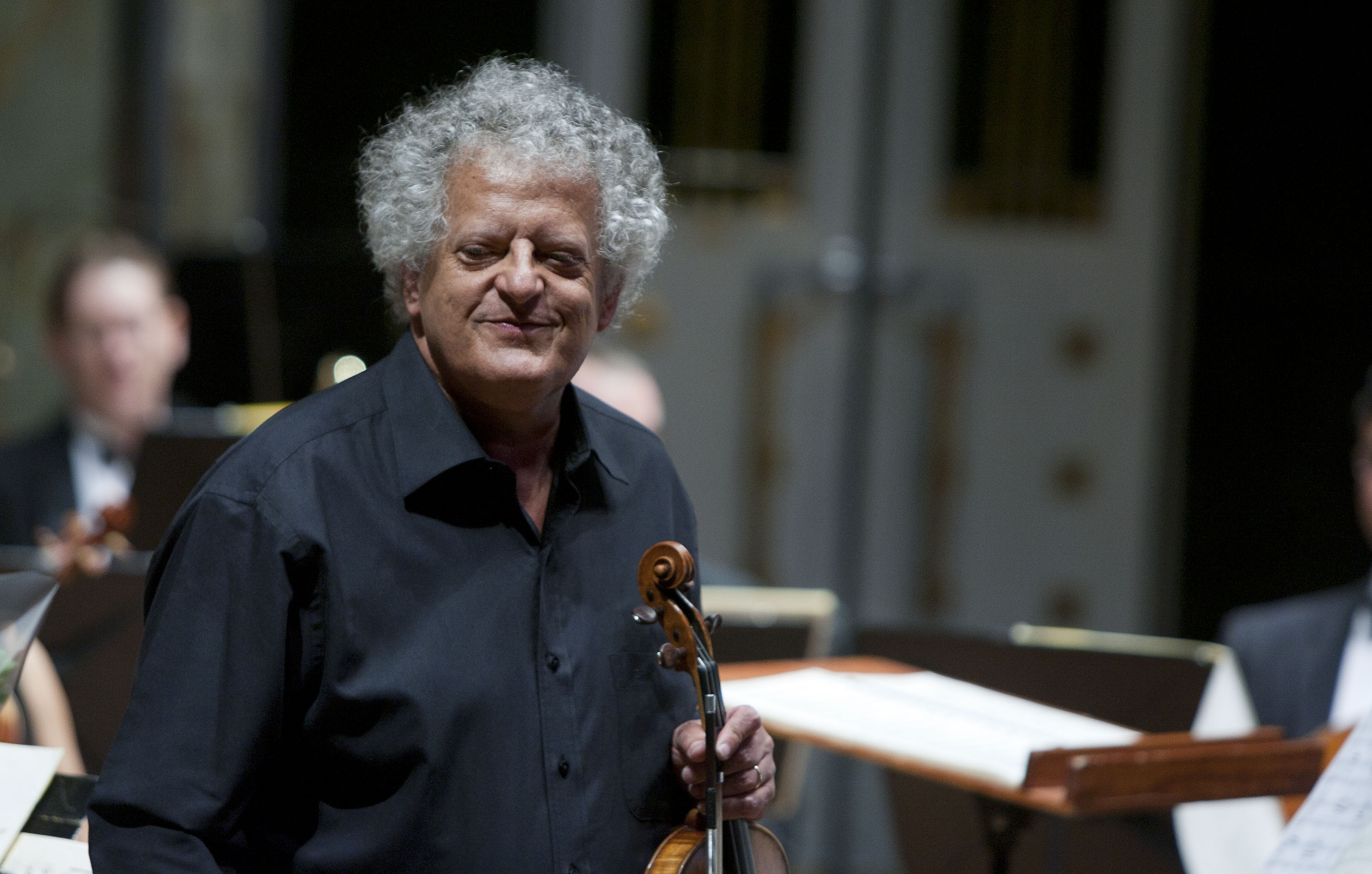
- Arditti at a concert with the Mexico City Philharmonic Orchestra (14 June 2014)

Background information
- Born: 8 February 1953 (age 73); London, United Kingdom
- Genres: Classical
- Occupation: Violinist
- Instrument: Violin
- Years active: 1974–present
- Member of: Arditti Quartet

Irvine Arditti (born 8 February 1953) is a Grammy-nominated British violinist, as well as the leader and founder of the Arditti Quartet.

== Biography ==
Arditti attended the Central Foundation Boys' School in London before continuing his studies at the Royal Academy of Music at the age of 16 where he studied with Clarence Myerscough and Manoug Parikian. He joined the London Symphony Orchestra in 1976 and after two years, at the age of 25, became its Co-Concert Master. He left the orchestra in 1980 to devote more time to the Arditti Quartet which he had formed while still a student.

In 1988 he was made an honorary Fellow of the Royal Academy of Music in recognition of his distinguished work. The Arditti Quartet was awarded the prestigious Ernst von Siemens Music Prize in 1999 for 'lifetime achievement' in music. An honorary fellowship followed from the Royal Swedish Academy of Music and in 2014 was awarded an honorary doctorate to the University off Huddersfield. In 2017 he received the Charles Cros Grand Prix in honorem, which is for lifetime achievement.

Arditti has been responsible for having given the world premières of a number of large scale works specially written for him. These include Iannis Xenakis' Dox Orkh and Toshio Hosokawa's Landscape III, both for violin and orchestra, as well as Brian Ferneyhough's Terrain, Luca Francesconi's Riti Neurali and Body Electric, James Dillon's Vernal Showers, Jonathan Harvey's Scena, Brice Pauset's Vita Nova, Roger Reynolds Aspiration and Salvatore Sciarrino's Le Stagioni Artificiali all for violin and ensemble.

He has also been responsible for the creation of many solo works including both of Ferneyhough's solo violin works, Intermedio and Unsichtbare Farben. He was responsible for inspiring John Cage to complete his Freeman Etudes giving the first complete performance of them in 1991 and also for inspiring other composers in several pieces as Pascal Dusapin and Roger Reynolds.

That same year, he was nominated for the Grammy Award for Best Chamber Music Performance at the 34th Grammy Awards for work by Bartok, Gubaidulina, and Schnittke.

He has appeared as soloist with many distinguished orchestras and ensembles which include the Bayerische Rundfunk, the BBC Symphony, the Berlin Radio Symphony, the Royal Concertgebouw, the Junge Deutsche Philharmonie, Ensemble Modern, the Munich Philharmonic, the Orchestre National de Paris, the Residentie Orchestra, the Rotterdam Philharmonic, the Asko Ensemble, the Ensemble Contrechamps, the London Sinfonietta, the Nieuw Ensemble, Le Nouvel Ensemble Moderne, the Oslo Sinfonietta, the Philharmonia Orchestra and the Schoenberg Ensemble. He has performed in most major concert halls and music festival throughout the world. His performances of many concertos have won acclaim by their composers, in particular György Ligeti, Henri Dutilleux, and Xenakis. He has recorded solo works widely, in more 30 albums, as well as having made more than 200 with the Arditti quartet.

His recording of Luciano Berio's violin Sequenza, on Mode Records won the Deutsche Schallplattenpreis for 2007 and was awarded best contemporary music release by the Italian music magazine Amadeus in 2008. In 2009 Arditti was appointed foreign member of the Royal Swedish Academy of Music.

In 2014 he received an honorary doctorate from the University of Huddersfield in the UK.

Arditti is married to the prominent Mexican composer Hilda Paredes. They reside in London. Irvine's son, Jake Arditti, is a noted countertenor.
