= ProQuartet =

ProQuartet – Centre Européen de Musique de Chambre is a French association with 'nonprofit organization' status under the fr:Association loi de 1901, created in 1987 by the French music producer and critic Georges Zeisel, which contributes to the promotion of the string quartet, to the support of the entire chamber music community and to the broadening of the audiences interested in it. Since 2021 it has been directed by Charlotte Bartissol.

== Actions carried out by the association ==
Four key areas guide ProQuartet's actions:

- support for the emergence of young professional training programs: a true incubator, ProQuartet offers support and development opportunities;
- research on the repertoire of the string quartet and the encouragement of contemporary creation by supporting the commissioning of new works;
- the production and distribution of concerts in France and Europe, in conjunction with loyal partners, and the direct production of three events: the ProQuartet Musical Encounters in Seine-et-Marne (since 1996), the "Night of the Quartet" (as part of Nuit Blanche), and the Orangerie Sonore (since 2022);
- reaching out to the public through interaction, amateur practices, school or extracurricular projects, meetings, conferences, etc. In parallel with the support of established or emerging professional artists, ProQuartet monitors and acts to share chamber music widely, with all audiences.

== Vocational training ==
As a certified training organization, ProQuartet-CEMC encourages and supports the vocation of young ensembles in search of an ideal of rigor and musical integrity, based on the idea of lineage and transmission from the greatest French and international chamber musicians.

They give masterclasses on the repertoire (from the classical period to the 21st century), in the form of interpretation courses in Paris and academies in the regions, ending with one or more concerts.

During these masterclasses, workshops on body awareness and mental preparation are also organised, as well as meetings with professionals from the music scene, particularly around themes related to career development and professional integration.

Members of the Quartets Alban Berg, Amadeus, Arditti, Artemis, Béla, Belcea, Borromeo, Casals, Cherubini, Cleveland, Danel, Diotima, Doric, Ebène, Hagen, Juilliard, Kolisch, Kuss, LaSalle, London Haydn, Manfred, Prazák, Prometeo, Quiroga, Rosamonde, Vogler, Ysaÿe, of the Trio Wanderer as well as the musicians and composers Maurice Bourgue, Gérard Caussé, Marc-Olivier Dupin, Eberhard Feltz, Louis Fima, Gary Hoffman, György Kurtág, Alain Planès, Menahem Pressler, Ferenc Rado, and Jörg Widmann are or were part of the teaching staff.

== Residencies ==
ProQuartet provides an incubator for outstanding artists and works towards the professional integration of young chamber music ensembles through its residency, which is based on four fundamental pillars: professional training, cultural action, concert production/distribution and creation.

A jury of professionals is responsible for selecting the resident ensembles from among French and European quartets and trios, which benefit from two years of support from ProQuartet.

Since 2022, the residency has been sponsored each season by a major figure in the field: Sonia Simmenauer in 2022–2023, Mathieu Herzog in 2023–2024, Marc Coppey in 2024–2025...

As of February 2026, musicians participating in ProQuartet residencies include the Fibonacci Quartet, Astatine Trio, and the Magenta Quartet.

== Concerts and events ==
ProQuartet organizes numerous concerts in the Paris region and throughout France, and sometimes beyond, both through its partnerships with festivals and iconic chamber music venues, and during its masterclasses, cultural initiatives, and its own festivals. These events offer diverse audiences the opportunity to discover the young talents and leading chamber musicians of tomorrow.

The concerts give pride of place to contemporary creation and ProQuartet commissions, and regularly showcase a lesser-known or forgotten repertoire, such as that of female composers.

== Cultural activities and amateur practices ==
ProQuartet is committed to making chamber music accessible to everyone, and develops an educational policy of cultural activities aimed at audiences who are unfamiliar with it or who do not have the opportunity to attend concerts (young audiences, families, residents of priority neighborhoods, people in precarious social situations, patients, residents of retirement homes, inmates of prison facilities, etc.). Through cultural mediation, the association also encourages resident ensembles to engage as civic-minded artists.

ProQuartet also offers a variety of chamber music activities (workshops, performances, etc.) throughout the year for amateur musicians of all levels, whether they play strings, wind instruments, or piano. The resident ensembles lead some of these activities.
