= String Quartet No. 15 (Schubert) =

1826 composition by Franz Schubert

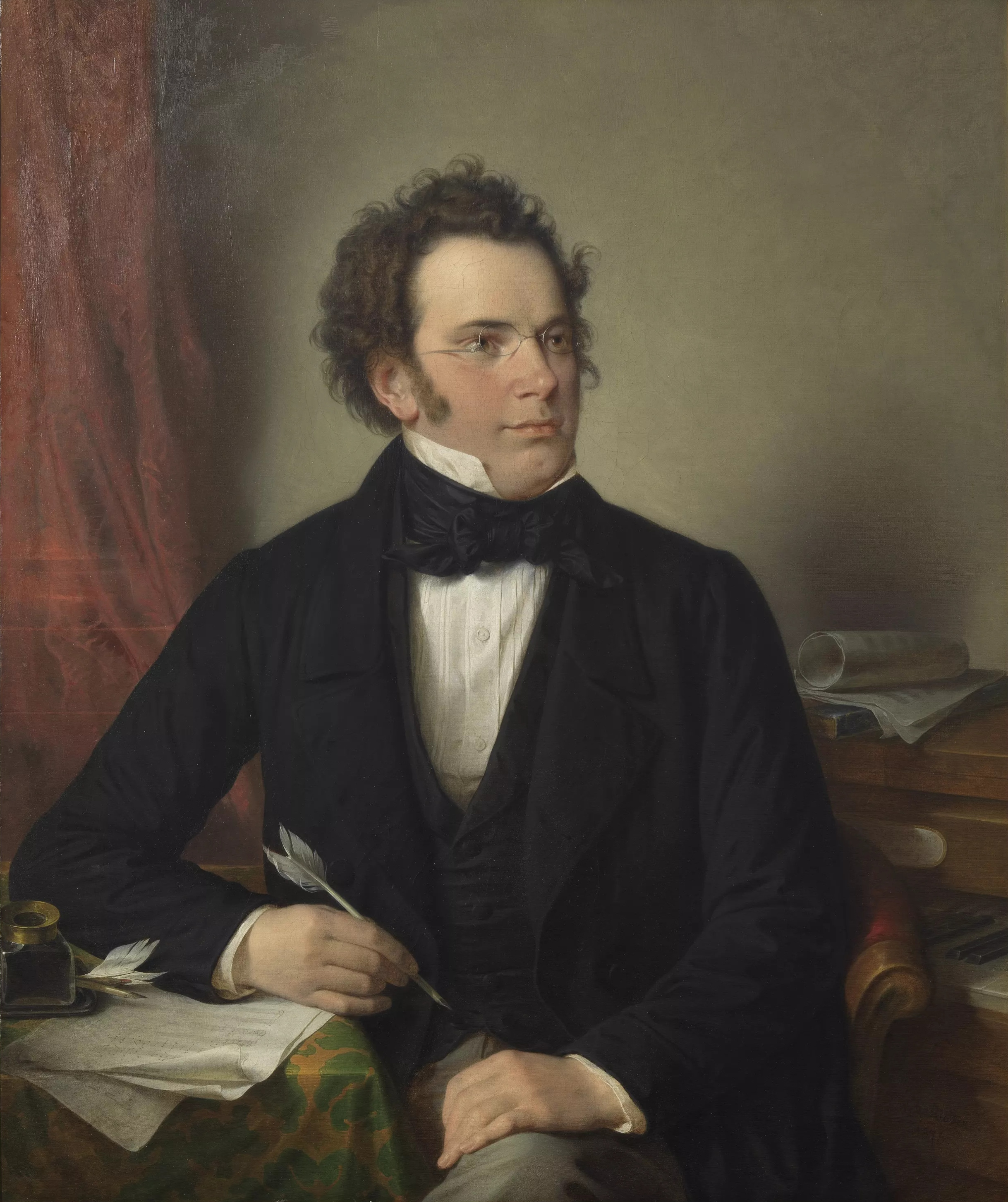
1875 portrait of Franz Schubert, after an 1825 original

The String Quartet No. 15 in G major, D. 887, was the last quartet written by Franz Schubert in June 1826. It was posthumously published in 1851, as Op. 161. The work focuses on lyrical ideas and explores far-reaching major and minor modes, which was uncommon to this degree in his compositions. Schubert reinforced this with a range of dynamic contrast and use of texture and pizzicato. The structural form of the movements in this quartet are somewhat ambiguous due to Schubert's focus on lyricism rather than traditional harmonic structure.

== Analysis ==
The four movements of the quartet are:

1. Allegro molto moderato (G major)
2. Andante un poco moto (E minor)
3. Scherzo. Allegro vivace – Trio. Allegretto (B minor)
4. Allegro assai (G major)

The length of performance of the quartet is about 50 minutes, if all repeats are observed. A notable performance by Ébène Quartet clocks at 55 minutes.

=== I. Allegro molto moderato ===
The first movement is based around a motive of chromatic descending fourths within alternating major and minor modes. The main lyrical theme of the movement which begins with a sixteenth note pickup to a dotted eighth note will be heard in many variations throughout the rest of the movements of the quartet. The first movement features extensive tremolo, which also leads into the repeat of the exposition. While many composers deconstruct a theme to smaller and smaller parts, Schubert is known for his lyricism and instead continually expands the theme.

This may include the use of a motive in triplets to connect the first and second main groups of this sonata form; the second group opens, exactly as happens in the later-written String Quintet and similar to the technique in some works by Beethoven — not in the dominant key but with a quiet theme in the mediant, B♭, with rhythm not quite the same as that of the lyrical theme that slowed matters down early on (bar fourteen, again), and adding to the texture with pizzicato accompaniment. There is a triplet-dominated, agitated transition and the same theme is heard, now in D, with triplet accompaniments; the triplets, not the theme, continue to the end of the exposition, and descend gradually from D down to G major for the repeat, or for the second ending and the beginning of the development, where continuity means the continued rustling of quiet strings, building for a bit by exchanging with more energetic passages, then bringing in faster versions of the dotted rhythms of the main themes. The climax of the development leads to a particularly quiet recapitulation, much varied at its opening from what we had heard originally. In the coda the opening of the quartet, both its rhythm and its major/minor exchanges, get a further chance to play themselves out.

There is a remarkably innovative harmonic passage in the first movement. Between mm. 414 and 429 Schubert prolongs G major with an equal subdivision of the octave using major thirds. Passing seventh chords in the bass provide a smooth linear progression connecting these major thirds, the result of which is a whole tone descent in the bass-voice, in this case the cello. The following major third prolongations occur: G(mm. 414–416) E♭ (mm. 417–418) B(mm. 419–420) G(mm. 421–422) E♭ (423–426). In measure 426 Schubert enharmonically reinterprets this dominant-seventh structure, resolving it as a German augmented 6th, thus proceeding ♭VI–V–I in mm. 427–429.

=== II. Andante un poco moto ===
The dramatic slow movement contains much in the way of a march rhythm and sudden upward violin glissandos followed by drops to the lowest string, and again much use of tremolo. This movement utilizes dramatic variations of ideas between subsequent episodes. The first episode containing a harmonically static solo in the cello accompanied by pizzicato. It abruptly shifts to a fortissimo episode in m. 43 reinforced by way of unisons in rhythms and octaves. This dramatic return of the theme from the first idyllic one is unlike the resolution of the theme in the first movement.

=== III. Scherzo. Allegro vivace – Trio. Allegretto ===
The scherzo is light-textured, fleet for much of its span, foreshadowing those of Mendelssohn. The trio is a mild accompanied duet, first between cello and first violin, then first violin and viola, then again cello and first violin. The trio's theme played by the cello is a reiteration of the second movement theme, also played by the cello. The third movement can be seen as a replication in form from the preceding movement. Here the scherzo and trio trade themes and in the second movement the theme and episodes similarly trade themes.

=== IV. Allegro assai ===
The finale continues the ambiguous form of the preceding movements in an extended movement where it is unclear if the movement is in sonata or rondo, G major or G minor. The opening theme has more rapid extremes in its exchanges between major and minor modes than that of the first movement. The rhythms are reminiscent of a tarantella, as with that of the previous quartet — which the movement resembles in some capricious qualities.

The quartet was first published no later than 1852, by Diabelli of Vienna.

== Cultural legacy ==
In Woody Allen's 1989 comedy-drama Crimes and Misdemeanors, parts of the Allegro molto moderato (including the dotted rhythm of the opening) are used as a dramatic measure during several scenes that form central parts of the 'crimes' plot.

In Gramophone, Stephen Johnson referred to the work as Schubert's greatest string quartet, and speculated that it is heard less frequently than the composer's previous two quartets not because of lower quality but because it is less accessible.

== Recordings ==
Schubert's String Quartet No. 15 in G major (D. 887) has been recorded by many quartets, including:

- Alban Berg Quartet
- Amadeus Quartet
- Artemis Quartet
- Auryn Quartett
- Belcea Quartet
- Brandis Quartet
- Busch Quartet
- Cherubini Quartet
- Chilingirian Quartet
- Cuarteto Casals
- Doric String Quartet
- Emerson String Quartet
- Fitzwilliam Quartet (historically informed performance)
- Guarneri Quartet
- Hagen Quartet
- Hugo Wolf Quartet
- Hungarian Quartet
- Juilliard String Quartet
- Kodály Quartet
- Kolisch Quartet
- Kuss Quartet
- Leipzig String Quartet
- Mandelring Quartet
- Melos Quartett Stuttgart
- New Orford String Quartet
- New Zealand String Quartet
- Oslo String Quartet
- Prazak Quartet
- Quartetto Italiano
- Quatour Terpsycordes (historically informed performance)
- Skálholt String Quartet (historically informed performance)
- Takács Quartet
- Tetzlaff Quartet
- Tokyo String Quartet
- Végh Quartet
- Verdi Quartett
