= David Dubery =

British musician

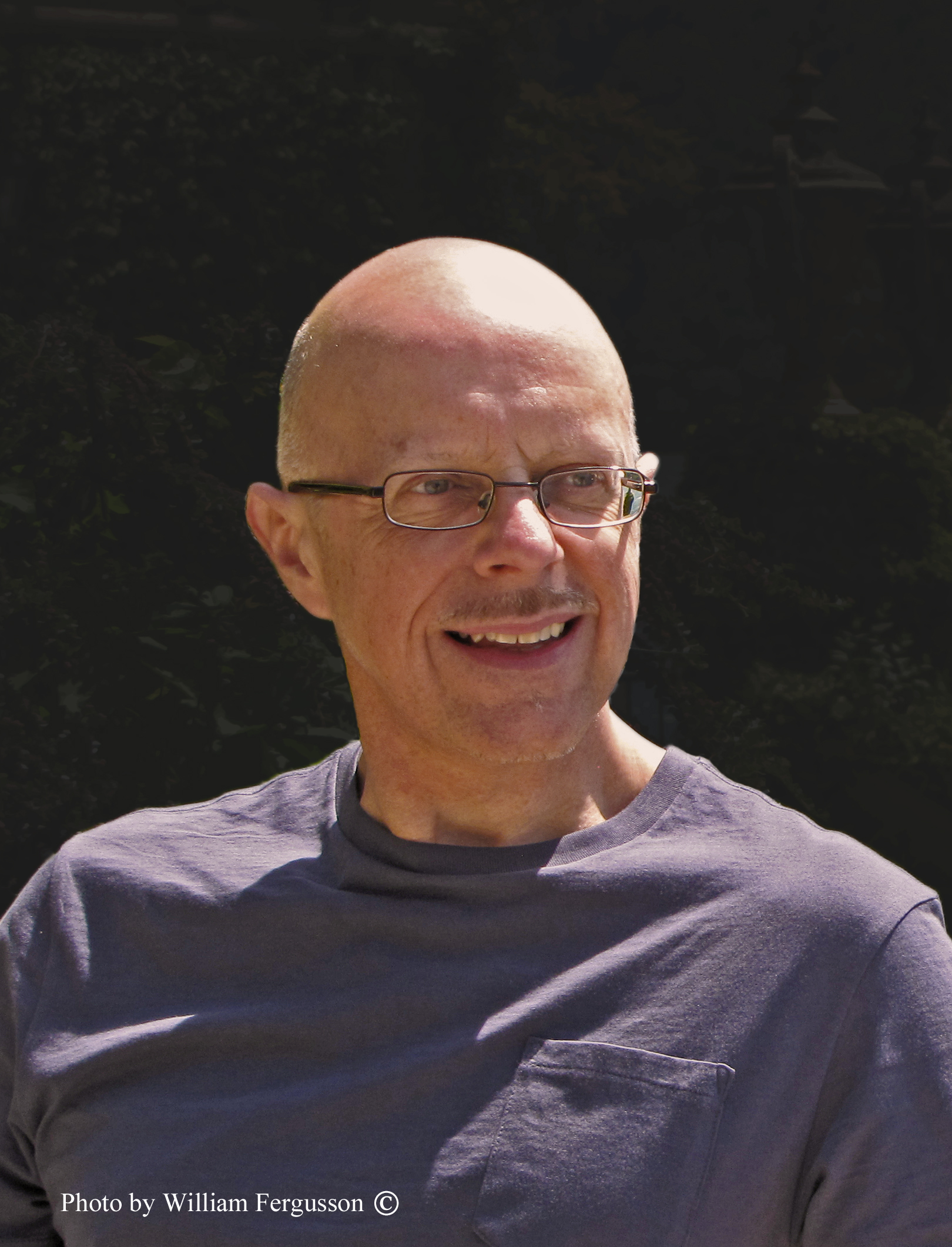
David Dubery 2014 Dosso d'Avedo - Lago di Como - Italia

David Dubery (Durban, 1948) is a South-African born British composer, pianist, vocal coach and academic. Dubery has been a music staff tutor at Long Millgate, Elizabeth Gaskell and Didsbury Colleges, Manchester Polytechnic, Metropolitan University, and Manchester School of Music for fourteen years (1972–1986), at the Manchester branch of The Actor’s Centre, Northern Actor’s Centre, and was vocal tutor/staff pianist & musical director for the Northern Ballet School for seventeen years (1986–2003). He also coached tenor Russell Watson.

== Recordings ==
- David Dubery: Songs & Chamber Music - "Sonatina for Oboe and Piano". Three Songs to Poems by Robert Graves. Four Songs. Suite from ‘Degrees of Evidence’. "Remember". Two Stopfordian Impressions. Sonata for Cello and Piano Escapades. Walking Cimbrone. Harlequinade. "Mrs Harris in Paris". Adrienne Murray (mezzo-soprano with David Dubery piano), John Turner, Paul Janes, Craig Ogden, Peter Dixon, Richard Simpson, Graham Salvage, Richard Williamson. Metier MSV28523 (2011)
- David Dubery; Observations. Seventeen songs and a string quartet. Three songs to poems by Douglas Gibson. Full fathom five. Time will not wait. Night Songs. Observations (6 songs to poems by Walter de la Mare). Cuarteto Ibérico (Ghosts of times past) for string quartet. James Gilchrist (tenor), Adrienne Murray (mezzo-soprano), Michael Cox (flute), David Dubery (piano) Cavaleri Quartet. Metier MSV28548 (2014)
- Anthony Burgess “The man and his Music”. Sonata for recorder & piano. John Turner (recorder), Harvey Davies (piano). Metier MSV77202 (2013)
- Antony Hopkins “A portrait”. “Evening in April”. Lesley-Jane Rogers (soprano), John Turner (recorder), Janet Simpson (piano). Divine Art DDA21217 (2012)
- British Recorder Concertos - “Mrs Harris in Paris”, John Turner (recorder), Camerata Ensemble conducted by Philip MacKenzie. Dutton CDLX7154 (2005)
- The World of Epoch “Mrs Harris in Paris” John Turner (recorder), Camerata Ensemble conducted by Phillip MacKenzie. Dutton Epoch. CDSPA2008 (2007)
- David Dubery: Music for Woodwinds and Piano & Piano Trio - Tre Giorni. Chimera. Sonatina for clarinet and piano. Music for an untold story. Remembering Satie. Hommage – in an olden style. Sonata for oboe and piano – Since Dawn is Breaking. Piano Trio – Tre Giorni. Paul Janes (piano), Sergio Castelló López (clarinet), Amy Yule (flute), Stéphane Rancourt (oboe), Zoë Beyers (violin), Simon Turner (cello). Prima Facie PFCD256 (2025)
- Transforming Text: Literature inspired works for oboe: Sonata for oboe and piano – Since Dawn is Breaking. Jenna Sehmann (oboe), Dan Kubus (piano). Navona Records NV6894 (2026)

== Publications ==
Home is the Sailor Two part song with Piano Roberton / Goodmusic 1980

The Wassail Bowl SATB a cappella MSM 1985

The Birds Medium Voice & Piano MSM 1985

Threesome for Two Players/ Sonatina Oboe & Piano Sunshine Music/Spartan Press 1994

Sonatina Recorder & Piano Peacock Press 2003

Mrs Harris in Paris Treble Recorder or Flute & Piano Peacock Press 2004

Three Songs to Poems by Robert Graves Medium Voice, Recorder (S/A) & Piano Peacock Press 2005

Away in a Manger (One night in December) Medium Voice, Flute or Recorder, & Piano Peacock Press 2007

Harlequinade Recorder & Guitar or Harpsichord Peacock Press 2010

A Bran Tub Descant Recorder & Piano Peacock Press 2010

Pipe Pieces Descant Recorder Forsyth 1996

Two Stopfordian Impressions Recorder or Oboe & Piano Forsyth 2010

Walking Cimbrone Bassoon & Piano Emerson Edition 2010

Escapades Flute or Recorder, Bassoon, & Piano Emerson Edition 2012

Since dawn is breaking Sonata for oboe and piano Emerson Edition 2016

An Aldeburgh Memoir: A first visit to the Aldeburgh Festival 1968.

Manchester Sounds Volume 6-2006 Pages 145-151 / The Manchester Musical Heritage Trust in association with Forsyth

Return to Aldeburgh: An account of the Adelburgh festival 1969 as a Duke of Hesse Scholar.

Manchester Sounds/ Volume 8-2010 Pages 188-215 / The Manchester Musical Heritage Trust in association with Forsyth
