= Dudok Quartet Amsterdam =

Dutch string quartet

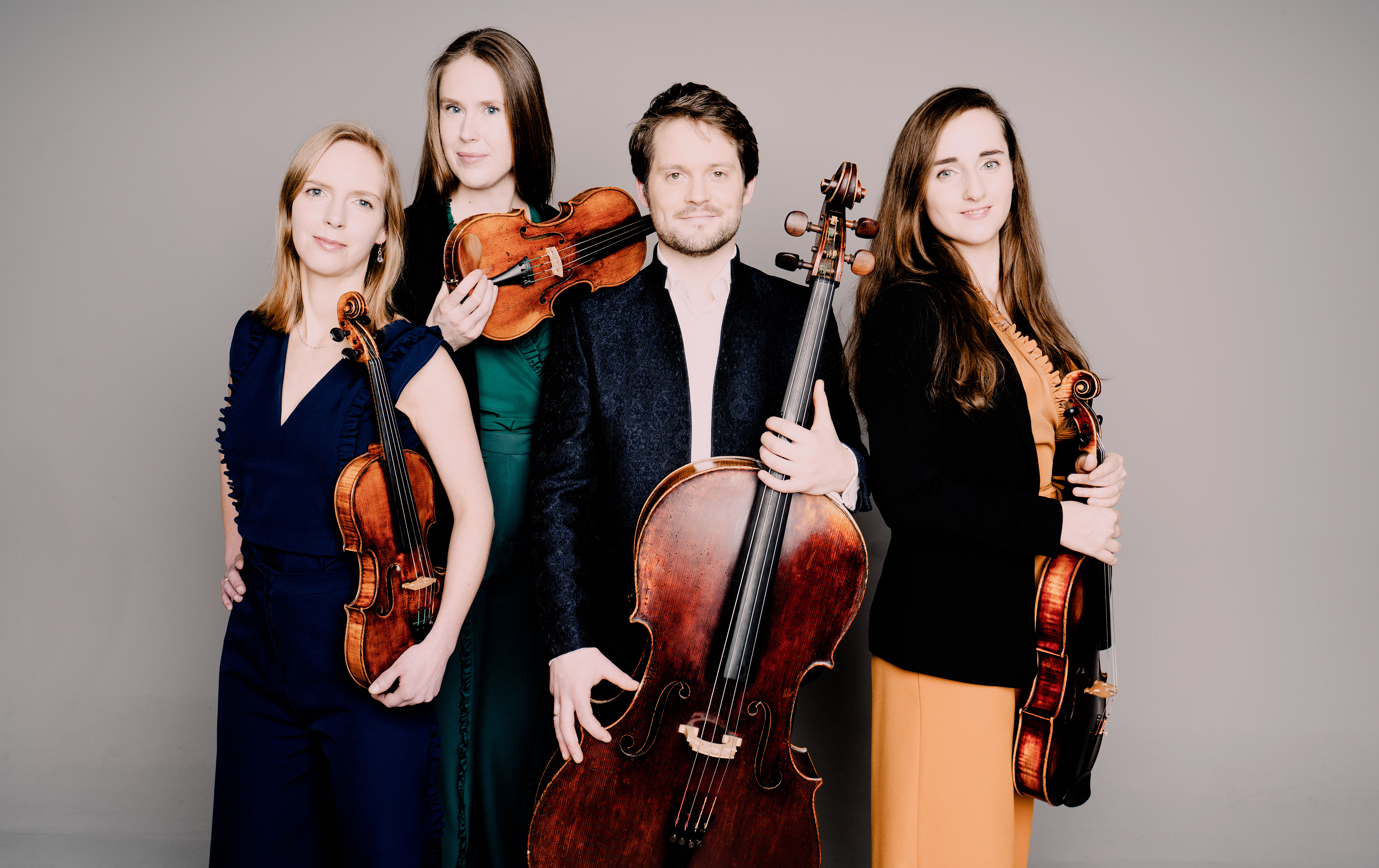
Portrait photo of the Dudok Quartet Amsterdam (Marco Borggreve)

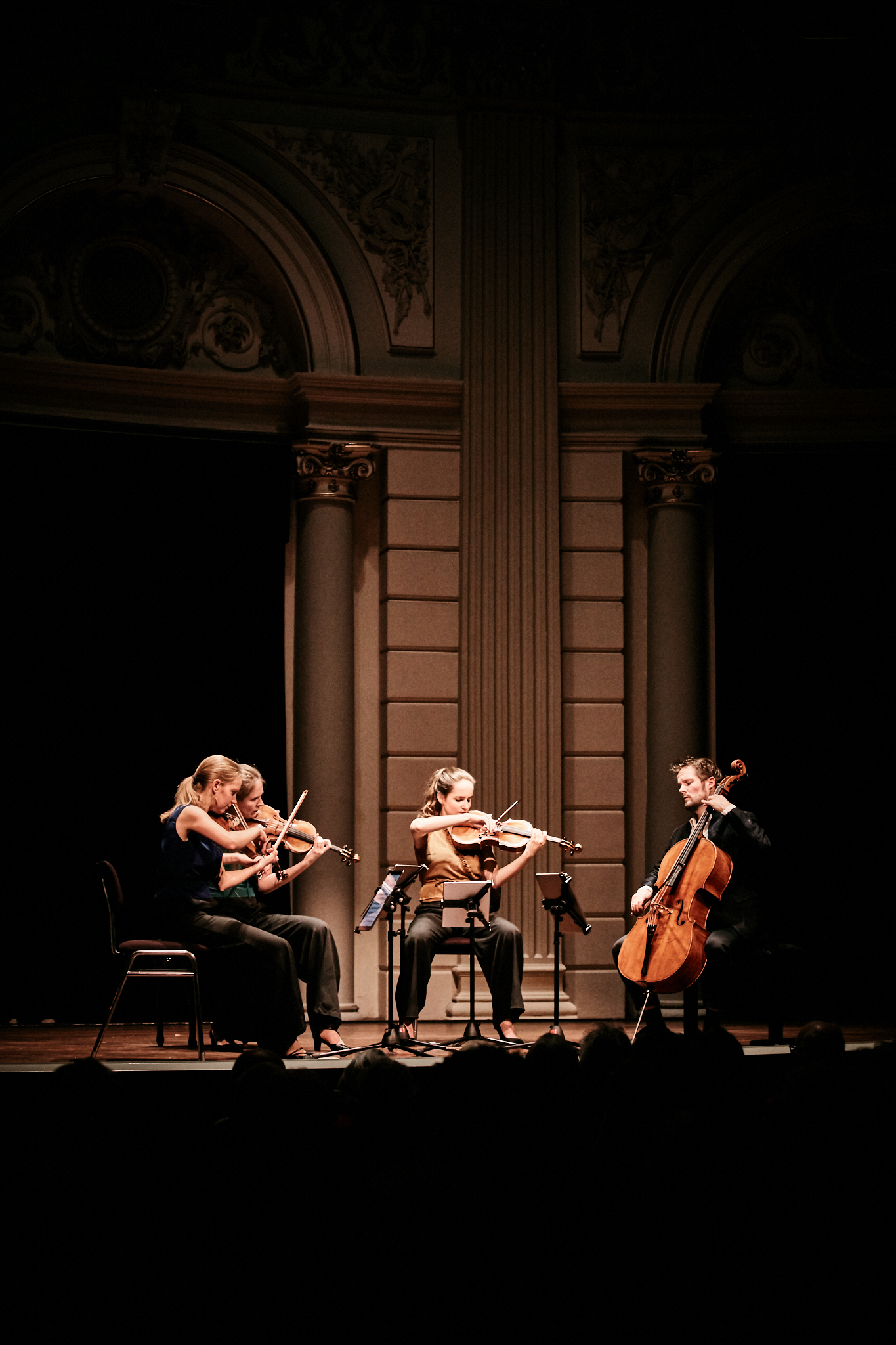
Dudok Quartet Amsterdam live at the Royal Concertgebouw in 2019 (Eduardus Lee)

The Dudok Quartet Amsterdam is a Dutch string quartet founded in 2009. The ensemble named itself after Dutch architect Willem Dudok, who wrote in his diary:

I owe more to composers than to any architectural artists. I feel deeply the common ground between music and architecture: after all, they both derive their value from correct proportions.

Since 2017, the Dudok Quartet Amsterdam consists of violinists Judith van Driel and Marleen Wester, violist Marie-Louise de Jong and cellist David Faber. Previous members were violists Mark Mulder (2009-2014) and Lotte de Vries (2014-2016).

== Education ==
The original members of the Dudok Quartet Amsterdam met while they took part in tours of the Ricciotti Ensemble. They studied individually at the conservatories in Amsterdam and The Hague. Together they studied at the Hochschule für Musik und Tanz Cologne with the Alban Berg Quartet from 2009 to 2011 and at the Dutch String Quartet Academy from 2011 to 2013, where their main teachers were Marc Danel, Eberhard Feltz and Peter Cropper. In the years since 2013, the quartet has been coached during specific projects by Reinbert de Leeuw, Eberhard Feltz and Shunske Sato, among others.

== Career ==
The quartet won multiple awards at international music competitions between 2011 and 2013, including at the Radom String Quartet Competition (2011), the Charles Hennen Competition (2012), the International Joseph Joachim Kammermusik Wettbewerb (2012) and Quatuors à Bordeaux (2013). In 2014, the quartet received the Kersjes van de Groenekan Prize, and in 2018 the international Borletti-Buitoni Trust Award

The string quartet performed in the Netherlands, and beyond in the United States, Australia, Southeast Asia and in several European countries.

Albums

Commencing in 2014, the quartet made five albums for the Resonus Classics label, featuring the complete string quartets of György Ligeti and works for string quartet by Haydn, Mozart, Mendelssohn, Weinberg and Shostakovich. On their first three albums, these works were supplemented by their own arrangements made by the quartet members, of works by Brahms, J.S. Bach, Desprez and Gesualdo. For the fourth and fifth albums, the Dudok Quartet Amsterdam chose all of Joseph Haydn's string quartets opus 20. Since 2021, new albums by the quartet have been released by Rubicon Classics. November 2022 saw the release of “Reflections,” an album of music by Dmitri Shostakovich and Grażyna Bacewicz, and June 2023 saw the release of “What Remains,” an album of music by Joey Roukens, Steve Reich and Olivier Messiaen.

Furthermore, the Dudok Quartet Amsterdam recorded complete works for string quartet by Brahms and Tchaikovsky for Rubicon Classics, with a historically inspired instrumental setup, un-wound gut strings and special bows.

== Collaborations ==
The Dudok Quartet Amsterdam performed with various guest musicians, including pianists Hannes Minnaar, Olga Pashchenko, Shuann Chai and Daria van den Bercken, violists Vladimir Mendelssohn, Lilli Maijala and Shunske Sato, cellists Dmitri Ferschtman, Pieter Wispelwey and Quirine Viersen, vocalist Philippe Jaroussky, and wind players Erik Bosgraaf, the Berlage Saxophone Quartet and Annelien Van Wauwe.

In 2024, the string quartet performed solo with the Dutch Radio Filharmonisch Orkest and conductor Vasily Petrenko during the Saturday Matinee at the Royal Concertgebouw.

Outside of the realm of classical music, they collaborated with artists such as Izaline Calister, Maarten Ornstein and Svante Henryson.
