= Tanja Tetzlaff =

German cellist (born 1973)

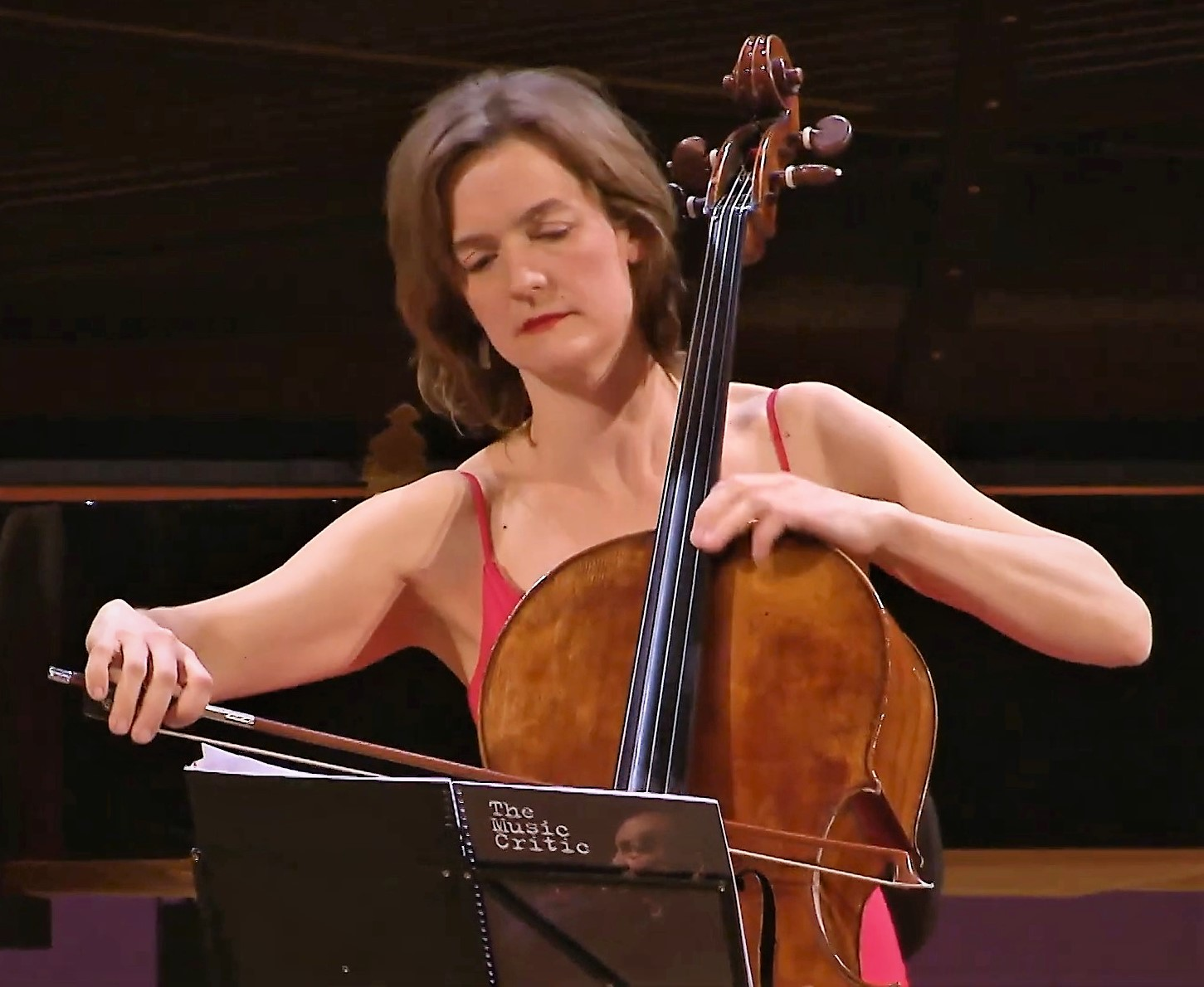
- Tanja Tetzlaff plays in The Music Critic, 2021
- Born: 1973 (age 52–53); Hamburg, West Germany
- Education: Hochschule für Musik und Theater; Mozarteum
- Occupation: Cellist
- Organizations: Deutsche Kammerphilharmonie Bremen; Tetzlaff Quartet
- Spouse: Florian Donderer
- Website: www.tanjatetzlaff.com

Tanja Tetzlaff (born 1973) is a German cellist. She played first as an orchestra member, but then as a soloist, a founding member of the Tetzlaff Quartet, a string quartet led by her brother Christian Tetzlaff, and as a chamber musician. She has recorded cello concertos and chamber music, including contemporary music, and has appeared internationally.

== Life ==
Born in Hamburg, Tetzlaff grew up in a pastor's household with three siblings. Tetzlaff studied cello with Bernhard Gmelin at the Hochschule für Musik und Theater in her hometown from 1985 to 1991, and studied further at the Salzburg Mozarteum with Heinrich Schiff until 1996. In 1994, she won third prize at the ARD International Music Competition. She played as principal cellist of the Deutsche Kammerphilharmonie Bremen.

She has performed as a soloist with orchestras including the Vienna Chamber Orchestra conducted by Yehudi Menuhin, with the Moscow Radio Symphony Orchestra conducted by Vladimir Fedoseyev, and the Tonhalle Orchestra Zürich. She appeared with the Bavarian Radio Symphony Orchestra, the Konzerthausorchester Berlin, the Orchestre de Paris and the Cincinnati Symphony Orchestra. More recently, she played with the Philharmonia Orchestra in London, the Iceland Symphony Orchestra, the Royal Northern Sinfonia, the Scottish Chamber Orchestra, the Orchestre Nationale des Pays de la Loire, and the NHK Orchestra Tokyo. She has toured internationally in Europe, the U.S. and in Japan.

She founded the Tetzlaff Quartet in 1994, a string quartet with her brother Christian Tetzlaff as the first violinist, Elisabeth Kufferath and Hanna Weinmeister. She has also performed chamber music regularly with pianists including Leif Ove Andsnes, Alexander Lonquich, Lauma Skride, Gunilla Süssmann and with Lars Vogt who founded the Spannungen chamber music festival in Heimbach. She has played with violinists including Baiba Skride and Antje Weithaas.

Tetzlaff's repertoire is wide-ranging and also includes contemporary music of the 20th and 21st centuries, such as a CD with the cello concertos by Wolfgang Rihm and Ernst Toch.

Since April 2024, Tetzlaff has been professor of cello and chamber music at the University of the Arts Bremen.

Tetzlaff is married to the violinist Florian Donderer. She plays an instrument by Giovanni Battista Guadagnini from 1776.

== Recordings ==
- Rautavaara: Works for Cello and Piano, with Gunilla Süssman, Ondine 2019
- Dvořák: Piano Trios No. 3 and 4, with Christian Tetzlaff and Lars Vogt, 2018
- Schubert: String Quartet No. 15 / Haydn: String Quartet Op. 20, No. 3
- Brahms: The Piano Trios, with Christian Tetzlaff and Lars Vogt, Ondine 2015
- Mendelssohn / Berg: Tetzlaff Quartet, CAvi 2013
- Brahms: Cello Sonatas, with Süssmann, CAvi 2013
- Rihm / Toch: Cello Concertos, NEOS 2011
