= Fibonacci Quartet =

British string quartet

- Origin: London, United Kingdom
- Genres: Classical, Chamber music
- Years active: 2019–present
- Members: Luna De Mol; Kryštof Kohout; Elliot Kempton; Findlay Spence
- Past members: Ami-Louise Johnsson (viola); Kosta Popović (cello)
- Website: www.fibonacciquartet.com

The Fibonacci Quartet is a European string quartet based in the United Kingdom. Formed in 2019 at the Guildhall School of Music and Drama in London the ensemble is composed of violinists Luna De Mol and Kryštof Kohout, violist Elliot Kempton, and cellist Findlay Spence.

The quartet has gained international recognition for its performances and competition success. In 2024, they became the first ensemble to win both the First Prize and the Audience Prize at the Premio Paolo Borciani International String Quartet Competition. They are also winners of the Royal Over-Seas League (ROSL) Chamber Music Competition and are currently represented by the Young Classical Artists Trust (YCAT). They have performed at major international venues including Wigmore Hall and the Berlin Philharmonie. During the 2025–26 season, the quartet is scheduled to make debuts at the Vienna Musikverein, the Philharmonie de Paris, and the Elbphilharmonie in Hamburg.

== History ==
The Fibonacci Quartet was founded in September 2019 at the Guildhall School of Music and Drama in London. The founding members were violinists Luna De Mol (Belgian) and Kryštof Kohout (Czech), violist Ami-Louise Johnsson (Swedish), and cellist Kosta Popović (Montenegrin).

Since its formation, the quartet has undergone personnel changes. Violist Elliot Kempton joined the ensemble in 2022, succeeding Johnsson. In November 2023, Scottish cellist Findlay Spence replaced founding cellist Kosta Popović.

== Education ==
The quartet's early development took place at the Guildhall School of Music and Drama, where they received coaching from Krysia Osostowicz, David Takeno, Louise Hopkins, and Matthew Jones.

They have pursued advanced studies as a Resident Ensemble at the Escuela Superior de Música Reina Sofía in Madrid under the tutelage of Günter Pichler, the former leader of the Alban Berg Quartett. Additionally, the group was part of the Dutch String Quartet Academy (NSKA) in Amsterdam, where they were mentored by Marc Danel of the Danel Quartet.

== Career ==
The Fibonacci Quartet performs regularly in the United Kingdom and across Europe. They have held residencies and fellowships at several major institutions. In 2024, they were selected as YCAT Artists after successful auditions at Wigmore Hall.

=== Residencies ===
- Royal Welsh College of Music & Drama: Appointed as the Resident Quartet.
- ProQuartet (Paris): Named Grand Résident ensemble for the 2025–2027 seasons.
- Royal Academy of Music: Appointed as Nina Drucker Fellows.
- Britten Pears Arts: Residency in Aldeburgh.

=== Awards and competitions ===
The quartet has achieved significant success on the international competition circuit:

- 2026: Received the Goldman Sachs Gives Award with the Verbier Festival Academy:
- 2026: European Concert Hall Organisation (ECHO) announced that the Fibonacci Quartet will be joining its Rising Stars programme for 2027–28
- 2026: Won the MERITO String Quartet Award 2026
- 2026: Awarded a fellowship with the Borletti-Buitoni Trust.
- 2024: First Prize and Audience Prize at the Premio Paolo Borciani International String Quartet Competition in Reggio Emilia, Italy.
- 2023: Winners of the Ensemble Prize at the Royal Over-Seas League (ROSL) Annual Music Competition.
- 2023: First Prize at the CAVATINA Intercollegiate Chamber Music Competition.
- 2021: First Prize at the International Triomphe de l’Art Competition (Belgium).
- 2020: First Prize and Audience Prize at the Beethoven Competition for Young Musicians in London.

== Members ==
Current Members

- Luna De Mol – Violin (2019–present)
- Kryštof Kohout – Violin (2019–present)
- Elliot Kempton – Viola (2022–present)
- Findlay Spence – Cello (2023–present)

Past Members

- Ami-Louise Johnsson – Viola (2019–2022)
- Kosta Popović – Cello (2019–2023)
