= International Izmir Festival =

Annual arts festival held in İzmir, Turkey

The International Izmir Festival (Turkish: Uluslararası İzmir Festivali) is an arts festival held annually in İzmir, Turkey and organized by the İzmir Foundation for Culture Arts and Education (İKSEV). It is a member of the European Festivals Association. It was held for the first time in 1987 under the name İzmir International Culture and Arts Festival. The most recent edition of the festival was held in 2024.

== Organisation ==
The International Izmir Festival is an arts festival held in İzmir, Turkey and organized by the İzmir Foundation for Culture Arts and Education (İKSEV). The foundation was established under the direction of philanthropist Nejat F. Eczacıbaşı. It was held for the first time in 1987 under the name İzmir International Culture and Arts Festival. The festival is a member of the European Festivals Association. The festival uses venues across Izmir and the ancient city of Ephesus.

== Events ==
The 2015 event was the 29th festival, and saw a farewell performance by the Buenavista Social Club.

The festival was held between 26 May 2018 and 7 July 2018. In 2021, the 34th festival was held, featuring the Schumann Quartet, and opera night with soprano Sabrina Sanza and baritone Guido Dazzini. Poyraz Baltacıgil and Nil Kocamangil played cello concertos with the izmİr State Symphony Orchestra as part of the Nejat F. Eczacibasi National Composition Competition.

In 2024, the festival finished with Turkish pianist and composer Fazıl Say and Ahmed Adnan Saygun in a Symphony Orchestra Concert at Bergama Asklepion.
