= Wigmore Hall Live =

Record label of venue in London, England

- Industry: Record industry
- Founded: October 2005; 20 years ago in London, United Kingdom
- Headquarters: London, England
- Products: Recordings of concerts at Wigmore Hall
- Website: www.wigmore-hall.org.uk/live

In October 2005, the Wigmore Hall, London, England, became the first concert hall to launch its own record label: Wigmore Hall Live, building upon the venue's existing reputation as a recital hall established early in the 20th century. One of the aims was to bring the musical programme to a wider audience. In the 2011 Gramophone Awards, Wigmore Hall Live won the special award: Label of the Year.

Before launching the label, state-of-the-art recording equipment and comprehensive sound insulation had to be installed. These improvements led to the Soile Isokoski disc (recorded live in 2006) receiving a Gramophone Award nomination.

Since 2005, the label has gone on to release discs featuring artists such as Dame Felicity Lott, Imogen Cooper, Christine Brewer, Trevor Pinnock, Jonathan Biss, the Gould Piano Trio, the Doric, Arditti and Kopelman string quartets, the Nash Ensemble, the Academy of Ancient Music and the Early Opera Company. Gramophone Award nominations have been linked to Wigmore Hall Live recordings by the late Lorraine Hunt-Lieberson, and Roger Vignoles, Soile Isokoski and Marita Viitasalo, Peter Schreier and Andras Schiff, and Gerald Finley and Julius Drake. The Elias String Quartet CD of Mendelssohn, Mozart and Schubert won a Newcomer Award in the BBC Music Magazine Awards 2010. Wigmore Hall Live discs have been reviewed in The Times and The Guardian, as well as on BBC Radio.
