= The Hebrides (overture) =

Concert overture by Felix Mendelssohn

The Hebrides Die Hebriden
- Concert overture by Felix Mendelssohn
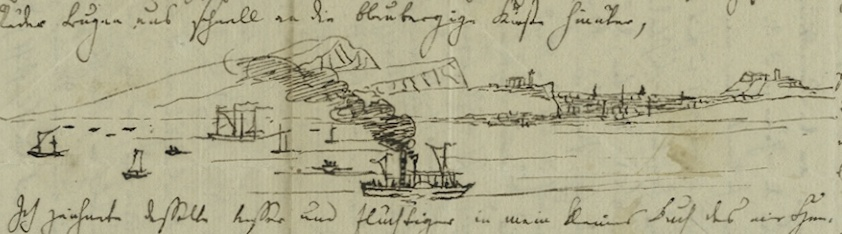
- Sketch of a view from the Firth of Forth, looking towards Arthur’s Seat and Edinburgh in Scotland by Felix Mendelssohn, in his letter of 1 August 1829 to his sister Fanny
- Key: B minor
- Opus: 26
- Dedication: Frederick William IV of Prussia
- Published: 1833
- The Hebrides Performed by the Musopen Symphony Orchestra

The Hebrides (/ˈhɛbrɪdiːz/; German: Die Hebriden) is a concert overture that was composed by Felix Mendelssohn in 1830, revised in 1832, and published the next year as Mendelssohn's Op. 26. Some consider it an early tone poem.

It was inspired by one of Mendelssohn's trips to the British Isles, specifically an 1829 excursion to the Scottish island of Staffa, with its basalt sea cave known as Fingal's Cave. It was reported that the composer immediately jotted down the opening theme for his composition after seeing the island. He at first called the work To the Lonely Island or Zur einsamen Insel, but then settled on the present title. However, in 1834, the year after the first publication, Breitkopf & Härtel issued an edition with the name Fingalshöhle (Fingal's Cave) and this title stuck, causing some confusion.

Fingal's cave is a spot on the Hebridean Isle of Staffa, some six miles from the much larger island of Mull which is close to mainland Scotland. According to legend the cave is the site of what was once the royal castle of Fion na Gael (anglicized to "Fingal"), ruler of the kingdom of Morven and father of the celebrated third-century warrior and bard known as Ossian. Every trace of the structure of the supposed castle has vanished and its floor has given way to the sea.

Being a concert overture, The Hebrides does not precede a play or opera, but is instead a standalone composition in a form common for the Romantic period. Dedicated to Frederick William IV of Prussia, then Crown Prince of Prussia, the B minor work became part of the standard orchestral repertoire and retains this position to the present day. The original handwritten score for the overture was purchased by the Bodleian Library on the 400th anniversary of its founding in 2002 for £600k.

As an indication of the esteem in which it is held by musicians, Johannes Brahms once said "I would gladly give all I have written, to have composed something like the Hebrides Overture". Although later better known for his hostility towards Mendelssohn, Richard Wagner initially praised his music, describing Mendelssohn as “a landscape painter of the first order” and calling the Hebrides Overture “his masterpiece.” The first 90 measures of the overture have been used as melody for the song The Outer Isle.

== Background ==
Mendelssohn first visited England in 1829 following invitations from Sir George Smart and the Philharmonic Society. Following his tour of England, Mendelssohn proceeded to Scotland, where he began work on his Symphony No. 3, Scottish. He was engaged on a tour of Scotland with his travelling companion Karl Klingemann when he sent a letter to his family with the opening phrase of the overture written on it. In a note to his sister Fanny, he said: "In order to make you understand how extraordinarily the Hebrides affected me, I send you the following, which came into my head there." The cave at that time was approximately 35 feet (11 m) high and over 200 feet (61 m) deep, and contained black basalt pillars.

The work was completed on 16 December 1830 and was originally entitled Die einsame Insel (The Lonely Island). However, Mendelssohn later revised the score and renamed the piece Die Hebriden (The Hebrides). Despite this, the title of Fingal's Cave was also used: on the orchestral parts he labelled the music The Hebrides, but on the score Mendelssohn labelled the music Fingal's Cave. This revision of the overture was premiered on 14 May 1832 in London in a concert conducted by Thomas Attwood, that also featured Mendelssohn's Overture to A Midsummer Night's Dream. The final revision was completed by 20 June 1832. and premiered on 10 January 1833 in Berlin under the composer's own baton.

== Description ==
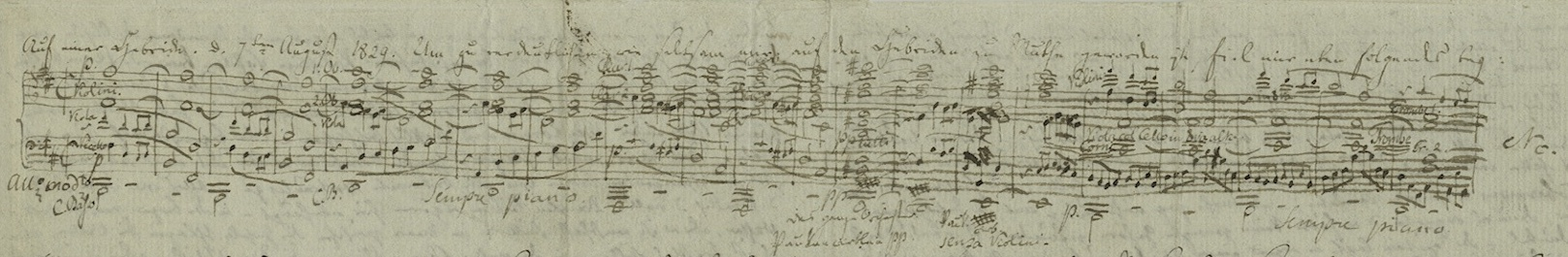
Initial sketch for the theme, found in a letter dated 7 August 1829 to his sister Fanny (original in the Music Division of the New York Public Library for the Performing Arts)

The music, though labelled as an overture, is intended to stand as a complete work. Although programme music, it does not tell a specific story and is not "about" anything; instead, the piece depicts a mood and "sets a scene", making it an early example of such musical tone poems. The overture consists of two primary themes; the opening notes of the overture state the theme Mendelssohn wrote while visiting the cave, and is played initially by the violas, cellos, and bassoons. This lyrical theme, suggestive of the power and stunning beauty of the cave, is intended to develop feelings of loneliness and solitude. The second theme, meanwhile, depicts movement at sea and "rolling waves".

The piece is scored for 2 flutes, 2 oboes, 2 clarinets, 2 bassoons, 2 horns, 2 trumpets, timpani and strings.

Performances of the overture typically last between 10½ and 11 minutes. The autograph manuscript of the work is held in the Bodleian Library, Oxford.

== See also ==
- Mendelssohn on Mull Festival
