= Signum Quartet =

German string quartet

The Signum Quartet is a string quartet based in Bremen, Germany. Founded in 1994, it has been playing in the current formation since 2016.

== Concert and festival appearances ==
The Signum Quartet has appeared at the Wigmore Hall in London, the Cité de la Musique in Paris, at the Berliner Philharmonie, the Amsterdam Concertgebouw, the Hamburg Laeiszhalle, the Liederhalle Stuttgart, the Philharmonie Essen and the Beethoven-Haus Bonn and has been invited to the Schleswig-Holstein Music Festival, the Rheingau Music Festival, Aldeburgh Festival of Music the BBC Proms and the Festival Aix-en-Provence.

At the invitation of the Goethe Institute, the quartet has undertaken extended concert tours which have hitherto seen them perform in Asia, Middle America and Africa.

Their album ‘No.3’ (released in May 2013) with quartets by Bartók, Schnittke and Berg was announced as the winner of the chamber music category of the International Classical Music Awards 2014.

Concerts by the four musicians have been broadcast nationally and internationally by stations of the ARD, Deutschlandfunk, DRS, ORF, BBC and Arte.

From 2009 to 2012 it was supported by the stART Programme of the Bayer Cultural Affairs Department (Bayer Kultur) and from 2011 to 2013 was named a BBC Radio 3 New Generation Artist.

== Members ==
- Florian Donderer (violin; until 2015 Kerstin Dill)
- Annette Walther (violin)
- Xandi van Dijk (viola)
- Thomas Schmitz (violoncello)

== Artistic development ==
Intensive studies with the Alban Berg Quartet, the Artemis Quartet and the Melos Quartet as well as masterclasses and co-operations with György Kurtág, Tabea Zimmermann, Walter Levin, Alfred Brendel, Jörg Widmann, Leon Fleisher i.a.

Chamber music studies at the Staatliche Hochschule für Musik und darstellende Kunst Stuttgart, Hochschule für Musik und Tanz Köln, Instituto International de Música de Cámara of the Escuela Superior de Música Reina Sofía in Madrid, Hochschule für Musik und Theater Leipzig (Tutorium).

== Awards and recognition ==
- Opus Klassik (2019)
- International Classical Music Awards (2014)
- BBC New Generation Artists (2011–2013)
- stART-Programme Bayer Kultur (2009–2012)
- International Chamber Music Competition, Hamburg (2009)
- London International String Quartet Competition (2009)
- Premio Paolo Borciani, Reggio Emilia (2008)
- Sonderpreis Zonta International
- Deutscher Musikwettbewerb (2004)
- Sonderpreis of the Rheingau Musik Festival (2000)

== Recordings ==
- Schubert – Ins stille Land. PENTATONE PTC 5186732 (2020)
- Schubert – Aus der Ferne. PENTATONE PTC 5186673 (2018)
- alla czeca: Antonín Dvořák – String Quartet in G major, op.106, Erwin Schulhoff – Five Pieces for String Quartet (1923), Josef Suk – Meditation on the Old Czech Chorale ’St. Wenceslaus’ op. 35a, Capriccio (2015)
- sound escapes: Claude Debussy – String Quartet in G minor, op. 10, Thomas Adès – Arcadiana, Maurice Ravel – String Quartet in F major, Capriccio (2015)
- No 3: Alban Berg – String Quartet op. 3, Béla Bartók – String Quartet No. 3, Alfred Schnittke – String Quartet No. 3, Capriccio (2013)
- Quartettsätze | Quartet Movements with works by H. Wolf, G. Puccini, C. Orff (premiere recording), C. Ives, W. Rihm, F. Schubert, A. Webern, Capriccio (2011)
- Horn Quintets by W.A. Mozart, W.G. Hauff, F.A. Hoffmeister, J.M. Haydn, L.van Beethoven, with Nury Guarnaschelli, horn, Capriccio (2011)
- String Quartets No. 1 and 2 by Ludwig Thuille, premiere recording, Capriccio (2010), i.a.

Guest appearances:

- Erkki-Sven Tüür – Lost Prayers, ECM (2020)
- Jörg Widmann – Viola Concerto, 24 Duos, "Jagdquartett": String Quartet No. 3, Harmonia Mundi (2018)
- Brahms: Johannes Brahms – Sonatas for viola and piano, op. 120, Hungarian Dances Nos 4, 5 & 16 arranged for viola and string quartet, with Nils Mönkemeyer, viola and William Youn, piano, Sony Classical (2015)
