= Levon Chilingirian =

- Born: Levon Chilingirian
- Origin: Nicosia, Cyprus
- Occupations: Violin, conductor
- Member of: Chilingirian Quartet

Levon Chilingirian OBE (Լեւոն Չիլինկիրեան born 28 May 1948) is a UK-based violinist of Armenian origin. The founder of the Chilingirian Quartet, he is also a professor and Chamber Music Artist in Residence at the Royal Academy of Music and professor of Violin and Chamber Music at the Guildhall School of Music and Drama, both in London.

== Early life and education ==
Born to Armenian parents in Nicosia, Cyprus, Chilingirian began playing the violin when he was five, being taught by his great-uncle, Vahan Bedelian. He came to Britain when he was 12 and studied at the Royal College of Music.

== Career ==
In 1971 he founded the Chilingirian Quartet, which has developed a strong association with a number of composers, including John Tavener and Michael Berkeley. He was also one of the first members of The English Concert, and played in their first London concert in 1973. The Chilingirian Quartet hold an annual summer school at West Dean College.

In addition to teaching, playing and recording, Chilingirian's interest in the work of Edvard Grieg led to his own version of the composer's incomplete Quartet in F major. Chilingirian served as musical director of Camerata Nordica, a Swedish chamber orchestra, was artistic director (2003–2016) of the Mendelssohn on Mull Festival and with the Quartet has been part of the Lake District Summer Music festival since its inception.

== Honours ==
With Clifford Benson (piano), he won first prize in the BBC Beethoven and the Munich Duo competitions in 1969 and 1971 respectively.

In the 2000 New Year Honours list, Chilingirian was appointed to the Order of the British Empire for services to music.
