= Cavaleri String Quartet =

UK musical group

The Cavaleri Quartet was a British string quartet. It gained a reputation as one of the leading European string quartets before it disbanded.

== Members ==
The quartet was formed in 2008 by Anna Harpham (violin), Ciaran McCabe (violin), Ann Beilby (viola) and Rowena Calvert (cello). Martyn Jackson (violin) also played with the quartet.

McCabe now plays with the Maggini Quartet.

== Awards ==
In 2011 they were recipients of the special prize for the best performance of a new quartet at the Premio Paolo Borciani International String Quartet Competition.

They won first prize at the 2012 Hamburg International Chamber Music Competition. At Hamburg, they were also awarded the Mendelssohn Prize of the Oscar and Vera Ritterman Foundation, and the Brahms Society Prize.

They won second prize at the Osaka International Chamber Music Competition 2014.
