= Chilingirian Quartet =

British string quartet founded 1971

The Chilingirian Quartet is a British string quartet. It gave its first public concert in Cambridge in 1972. By the time the quartet celebrated its 50th anniversary in 2022, there had been various changes in the line-up. However, it has continued to be led by Levon Chilingirian.

== History ==
Founded in 1971 in London, it became a resident quartet of the University of Liverpool (1973–1976) after taking lessons with Siegmund Nissel from the Amadeus Quartet. In 1976 they won the International Competition for Young Concert Artists and became resident quartet of the Royal College of Music of London.

=== Festival appearances ===
The quartet had a long-term association with the Lake District Summer Music Festival from its inception in 1985. They were also involved with the Scottish chamber music festival "Mendelssohn on Mull" of which Levon Chilingirian was artistic director from 2003 to 2016.

== Members ==
- Levon Chilingirian* first violin
- Mark Butler, Charles Sewart, Ronald Birks (2009–2020), second violin
- Simon Rowland-Jones*, Csaba Erdélyi (1980–1987), Louise Williams (1987–), Susie Mészáros, Asdis Valdimarsdottir, viola
- Philip De Groote* Stephen Orton (2013– ) cello

Note: * = founder member

== Premieres ==
- Mouvement pour quatuor à cordes 1988 by Alain Daniel.
- Closer 1988 by Frédérick Martin

== Recordings ==
Amongst other recordings a box set of LPs of Schubert's last three quartets was issued by Nimbus Records on Nimbus2301/2/3 from 1978 studio performances where Simon Rowland-Jones was the violist.

== Other selected recordings ==
- Antonín Dvořák: String Quartet No. 8 & String Quartet No. 9. Chandos Records (1990)
- Antonín Dvořák: String Quartet No. 13, String Quartet in F Major & Two Waltzes. Chandos Records (1991)

== Source ==
- Alain Pâris, Dictionnaire des interprètes, series Bouquins, Éditions Robert Laffont 1989, p. 1057
