= Simon Rowland-Jones =

Simon Rowland-Jones (born 1950) is a violist, composer, and music editor. He is best known for his arrangement of the Bach Cello Suites for Viola, which is widely praised as one of the best scholarly editions of the work for viola.

He has taught at the Malmö Academy of Music in Sweden, the Royal College of Music, the Royal Northern College of Music, the Royal Welsh College of Music & Drama and the Yehudi Menuhin School. He studied at the Yehudi Menuhin School, and later with Bruno Giuranna at the Academia de Santa Cecila in Rome. He was the founding violist of the Chilingirian Quartet, and has also recorded several albums as a soloist.

His mother Penny was the niece of philosopher Henri Bergson.

== Selected works ==
- Four Phases for violin solo (1979)
- Serenade for 10 winds (double wind quintet) (1979)
- Seven Pieces for viola solo (1979)
- Sonata for piano (1981)
- String Quartet (1993)

== Sources ==
1. Bio, Meridian Record Label Website (Retrieved Sept 16, 2006)
