= Schumann Quartet =

German string quartet

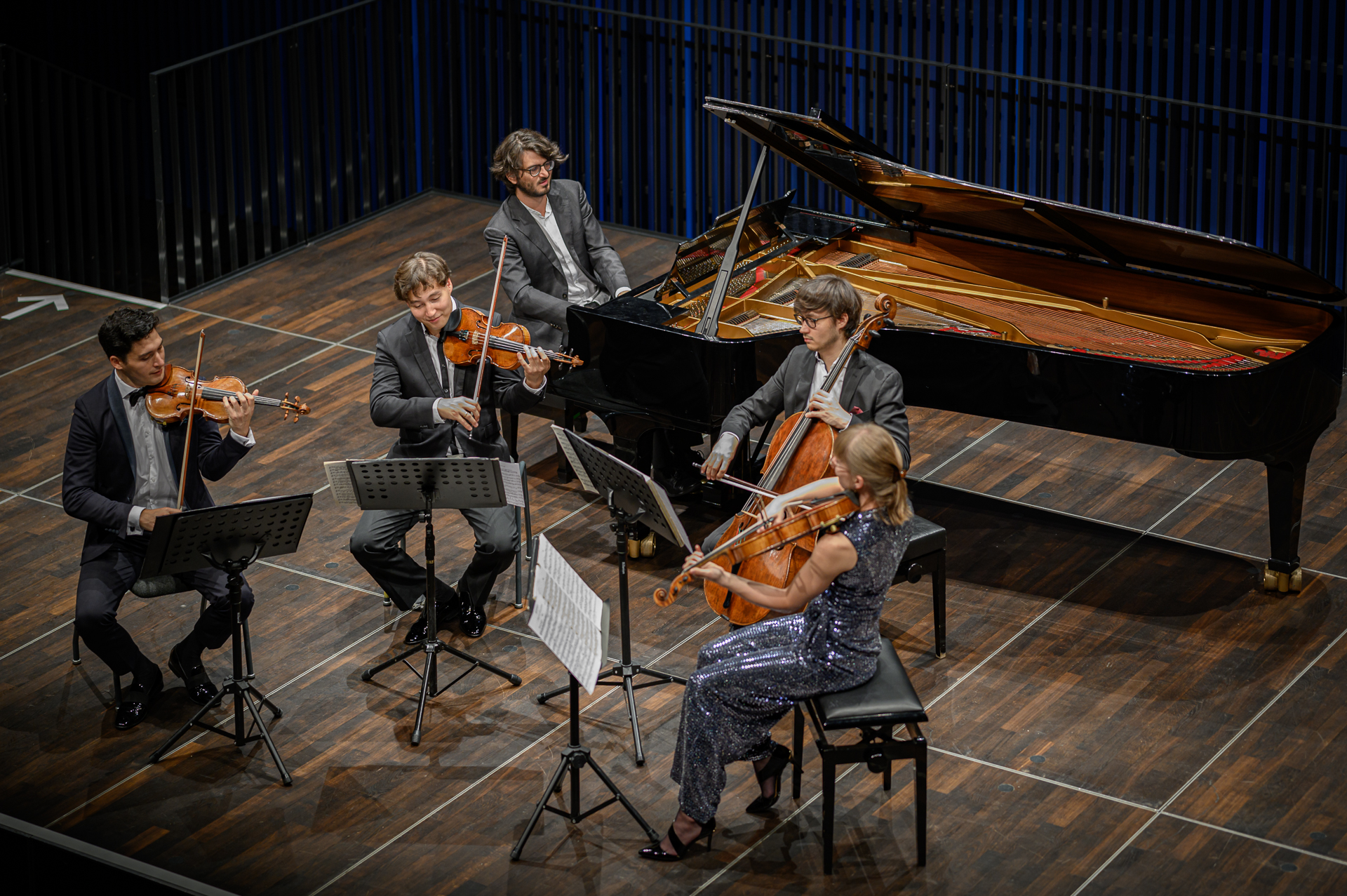
The Schumann Quartet with Matan Porat on September 27, 2020 at the Donauhallen in Donaueschingen

The Schumann Quartet is a German string quartet founded in Cologne in 2007, consisting of the three brothers Erik Schumann (violin), Ken Schumann (violin) and Mark Schumann (violoncello) as well as the viola player Veit Hertenstein. It is not named after the composer Robert Schumann, but after the three Schumann brothers.

== Members ==
- 1. Violin: Erik Schumann
- 2. Violin: Ken Schumann
- Viola: Ayako Goto (until 2012), Liisa Randalu (2012–2022), Veit Hertenstein (since 2022)
- Cello: Mark Schumann

== Education ==
The ensemble was trained by the Alban Berg Quartet in Cologne and especially by Günter Pichler at the Reina Sofía School of Music in Madrid. The quartet gained chamber music experience with Harald Schoneweg of the Cherubini Quartet. Further mentor was Eberhard Feltz.

== Concert and management ==
Since the 2009/2010 season, the Schumann Quartet has been in the Robert Schumann Hall in Düsseldorf with the series "Erstklassik" Artist in Residence. The ensemble is a regular guest in halls such as the Concertgebouw Amsterdam and the Wigmore Hall in London. Concert performances take the ensemble regularly throughout Europe, to Japan and Canada. The Schumann Quartet is one of the artists of the Chamber Music Society of Lincoln Center in New York.

== Chamber music partner ==
Chamber music partners of the quartet are Menahem Pressler, Henri Sigfridsson, Sabine Meyer, Nils Mönkemeyer, Nicolas Altstaedt and Albrecht Mayer.

== Recordings ==
The Schumann Quartet's debut CD with works by Beethoven, Bartók and Brahms was released in April 2013 on the ARS-Produktion label (OCLC 1444912196). The second CD with works by Mozart, Ives and Verdi was released in January 2015 (OCLC 908590962). The ensemble is represented with radio recordings on WDR, NDR, SWR, Radio France and SRF. In 2017, the album Landscapes with works by Haydn, Bartok, Takemitsu and Pärt was released by Berlin Classics, with which they received the Preis der deutschen Schallplattenkritik (OCLC 1184952980).

- Richter, Anna Lucia; Schumann Quartett (2018), Intermezzo (in no linguistic content), Hamburg: Edel Germany GmbH, OCLC 1032606671
- Schumann Quartett (2019), Chiaroscuro (in no linguistic content), Hamburg: Berlin Classics, OCLC 1301278479
- Schumann, Robert; Schumann Quartett (2020), Fragment (in no linguistic content), Hamburg: Berlin Classics/Edel, OCLC 1245375449

== Awards ==
The Schumann Quartet was prizewinner of the 7th International Chamber Music Competition in Osaka and the "Premio Paolo Borciani" (both 2011). It won first prizes at the 8th International Competition "Schubert und die Musik der Moderne" in Graz (2012) and at the renowned string quartet competition in Bordeaux (2013). In 2014, the "Jürgen Ponto Foundation" has awarded the music prize in the string quartet category to the Schumann Quartet.

The Schumann Quartet is a scholarship holder of the Villa Musica Foundation Rhineland-Palatinate and was supported by the "Irene Steels-Wilsing Foundation" and the "Werner Richard-Dr. Carl Dörken Foundation".

The ensemble is an award winner of the WDR series "Taste the Best – The Stars of Tomorrow" in cooperation with the Hochschule für Musik und Tanz Köln.

The quartet is represented by the Impresariat Simmenauer in Berlin.
