= Mendelssohn on Mull Festival =

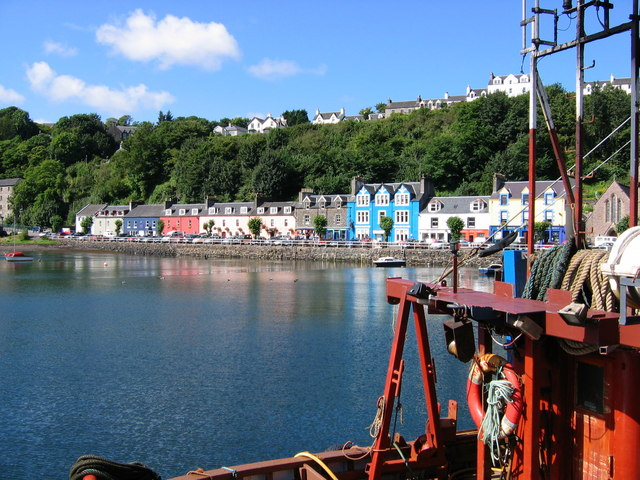
Tobermory on the Isle of Mull. The town's parish church is one of the festival's venues.

The Mendelssohn on Mull Festival is an annual festival of chamber music. It is held at various venues on the Scottish islands of Mull and Iona and the surrounding area.

The festival was founded in 1988 by Leonard Friedman. Since 2019, the festival has been held in September. It is currently directed by the Maxwell String Quartet.

== Name ==
Mendelssohn's The Hebrides / Fingal's Cave
Performed by the Musopen Symphony Orchestra

The festival takes its name from a visit by the composer Felix Mendelssohn to Scotland in 1829. Although only twenty years old, Mendelssohn was already an established composer and conductor. The natural beauty of Scotland and its rich history of fact and fable delighted the young composer and inspired his Hebrides overture and Symphony No. 3, Scottish.

Mendelssohn stayed in Tobermory on Mull en route to Staffa where he visited Fingal's Cave. The concert overture known both as The Hebrides and as Fingal's Cave was composed shortly after his visit, and was originally entitled "The Lonely Island". Mendelssohn sent a postcard to his family with the opening phrase of the overture written on it. In a note to his sister, Fanny Mendelssohn he said: "In order to make you understand how extraordinarily the Hebrides affected me, I send you the following, which came into my head there."

The festival that now bears his name was conceived as a musical pilgrimage in commemoration of Mendelssohn's visit.

== History ==
The festival was founded in 1988 by the violinist Leonard Friedman, as a week of music-making, concentrating on string chamber music, where the participants were a blend of established professionals and students, at which audiences were welcome at no cost.

Following Friedman's death in 1994, the festival has maintained this pattern with artistic direction being provided by Levon Chilingirian (2003–2016), and the Doric String Quartet from 2018. During their association with the Festival, the Doric recorded Mendelssohn's string quartets for Chandos. The Maxwell String Quartet took over in 2024.

The festival is administered by a trust which organises the events and pays the expenses of the participants and professionals. Since 2016 the festival has been administered by Sound Waves SCIO.
