= Florian Donderer =

German violinist and conductor

- Born: 1969 (age 56–57); Berlin
- Occupations: Classical violinist; Conductor
- Organizations: Deutsche Kammerphilharmonie Bremen
- Spouse: Tanja Tetzlaff

Florian Donderer (born 1969 in Berlin) is a German violinist and conductor.

== Career ==
Donderer's parents were also musicians: his father a cellist, his mother a flautist.

Donderer studied violin in London and Berlin, where he was a scholarship holder at the Karajan Academy of the Berlin Philharmonic. Since 1999 he has been concertmaster of the Deutsche Kammerphilharmonie Bremen, at whose academy he also teaches, as well as concertmaster of the Balthasar Neumann Choir and Ensemble and has also been playing in the Signum Quartet since 2016.

In 2010, he made his first appearance as conductor with the Ensemble Oriol and Christiane Oelze at a concert in the Berlin Philharmonie. He is artistic director of the music festival Sommersprossen in Rottweil since 2019. He has played at the Spannungen chamber music festival in Heimbach. Donderer plays a violin by Stefan-Peter Greiner from 2003.

== Private life ==
Donderer is married to the cellist Tanja Tetzlaff they have two children.
