= John Turner (recorder player) =

English recorder player and former lawyer

John Turner (born 1943) is an English recorder player and a former lawyer. He has done much to encourage the development of contemporary music for the recorder, particularly from British composers.

Turner was born in Stockport and attended Stockport Grammar School, where the music master was Geoffrey Verney (previously a colleague of Ralph Vaughan Williams) and the assistant music master Douglas Steele (1910-1999, a composer and previously an assistant to Thomas Beecham at Covent Garden). Here Turner began to play recorder and was first introduced to a wide range of repertoire.

He went on to study law at Fitzwilliam College, Cambridge, where he also continued to pursue his musical interests with contemporaries such as Christopher Hogwood and David Munrow. He then took up a legal career, often acting for musicians and musical institutions. In later life he retired from legal work and became a full time musician.

Many composers have written recorder music especially for Turner, including Arthur Butterworth, John Casken, Arnold Cooke, Gordon Crosse, Peter Dickinson, David Dubery, Howard Ferguson, John Gardner, Anthony Gilbert, Peter Hope, John Joubert, Kenneth Leighton, Norman Kay, Robin Orr, Ian Parrott, Ronald Stevenson and Christopher Wright. He claims to have given over 600 first performances of works for the recorder, including pieces by non-British composers such as Leonard Bernstein, Ned Rorem and Peter Sculthorpe. Turner is also a composer of works such as the Four Diversions for descant recorder and piano, which were first performed by David Munrow and Christopher Hogwood at Adlington Hall, Macclesfield in 1969.

Turner has issued many recordings, including (with pianist Peter Lawson) John and Peter's Whistling Book, English Recorder Concertos, Jigs, Airs and Reels, and titles issued by Divine Art Recordings and Prima Facie.
