= Premio Paolo Borciani =

The International String Quartet Competition "Premio Paolo Borciani" was created in 1987 in Reggio Emilia, Italy, and is dedicated to their famous fellow citizen, founder and first violin of the Quartetto Italiano. The promoter and organiser is Fondazione I Teatri in Reggio Emilia; artistic director is Paolo Cantù; founder was pianist Guido Alberto Borciani, Paolo Borciani’s brother. The competition has been a member of the World Federation of International Music Competitions since 1991.

== Competition results ==
=== 1987 ===
- 1st Prize: not awarded
- 2nd Prize: Carmina String Quartet, Switzerland
- 3rd Prize: not awarded

=== 1990 ===
- 1st Prize: Keller String Quartet, Hungary
- 2nd Prize: Lark String Quartet, United States
- 3rd Prize: ex-aequo Danubius String Quartet, Hungary and Subaru String Quartet, Japan

=== 1994 ===
- 1st Prize: not awarded
- 2nd Prize: Mandelring String Quartet, Germany
- 3rd Prize: not awarded
- Special Prize: Mandelring String Quartet, Germany (best performance of the Quartet commissioned from Marco Stroppa)

=== 1997 ===
- 1st Prize: Artemis String Quartet, Germany
- 2nd Prize: not awarded
- 3rd Prize: ex-aequo Auer String Quartet, Hungary and Lotus String Quartet, Japan
- Special Prize: Lotus String Quartet, Japan (best performance of the Quartet commissioned from Luciano Berio)

=== 2000 ===
- 1st Prize: not awarded
- 2nd Prize: Excelsior String Quartet, Japan
- 3rd Prize: Casals String Quartet, Spain
- Special Prize: Excelsior String Quartet, Japan (best performance of the Quartet commissioned from Salvatore Sciarrino)

=== 2002 ===
- 1st Prize: Kuss String Quartet, Germany
- 2nd Prize: Pacifica Quartet, United States
- 3rd Prize: Auer Quartet, Hungary
- Special Prize: Ex-aequo Kuss Quartet and Pacifica Quartet (best performance of the Quartet commissioned from Wolfgang Rihm)

=== 2005 ===
- 1st Prize: Pavel Haas Quartet, Czech Republic
- 2nd Prize: Tankstream Quartet, Australia
- 3rd Prize: Chiara String Quartet, United States
- 4th Prize: €4,000, offered by Mrs Irene Steels-Wilsing (Brussels) in memory of an unforgettable week Biava Quartet, United States
- Special Prize for the best performance of the quartet commissioned from Sir Peter Maxwell Davies: Pavel Haas Quartet, Czech Republic

=== 2008 ===
- 1st Prize: Bennewitz String Quartet, Czech Republic
- 2nd Prize: Doric String Quartet, Great Britain
- 3rd Prize: ex aequo Ardeo String Quartet, France and Signum String Quartet, Germany
- Special Prize Irene Steels-Wilsing: Amaryllis String Quartet, Germany/Switzerland
- Special Prize for the best performance of the new quartet commissioned from Giovanni Sollima: Quiroga String Quartet, Spain

=== 2011 ===
- 1st Prize: not awarded
- Finalist Prize: Amaryllis Quartet, Germany; Meccorre Quartet, Poland; Voce Quartet, France
- Audience Prize: Voce Quartet, France
- Special Prize for the best performance of the new quartet commissioned from Giya Kancheli: ex aequo Meccorre Quartet, Poland and Cavaleri Quartet, UK

=== 2014 ===
- 1st Prize: Kelemen Quartet, Hungary
- 2nd Prize: Mucha Quartet, Slovakia
- 3rd Prize: Varèse Quartet, France
- Audience Prize: Mucha Quartet, Slovakia
- Special Prize for the best performance of a contemporary piece: Varèse Quartet, France

=== 2017 ===
- 1st Prize: not awarded
- 2nd Prize: Omer Quartet, United States
- 3rd Prize: Quartetto Adorno, Italy
- Audience Prize: Quartetto Adorno, Italy
- Special Prize for the best performance of a contemporary piece: Quartetto Adorno, Italy

=== 2021 ===
- 1st Prize: not awarded
- 2nd Prize: Balourdet Quartet, United States; Leonkoro Quartet
- Third Prize and Under 20 Prize: Adelphi Quartet, Belgium, Spain, Serbia, Germany.
- Audience Prize: Leonkoro Quartet, Germany
- Special Prize for the best performance of a contemporary piece: Arete Quartet, South Korea

=== 2024 ===
- 1st Prize: Fibonacci Quartet, UK
- 2nd Prize: Eden Quartet, South Korea
- 3rd Prize: Elmore Quartet, UK
- Audience Prize: Fibonacci Quartet, UK
- Special Prize for the best performance of a contemporary piece: Ast Quartet, South Korea

== Honorary Committee ==
- Martha Argerich
- Borodin String Quartet
- Radu Lupu
- Riccardo Muti
- Arvo Pärt
- Maurizio Pollini
- Wolfgang Rihm
- Salvatore Sciarrino
- Marco Stroppa

== See also ==
- List of classical music competitions
- World Federation of International Music Competitions
- String quartet
