= Eberhard Feltz =

German classical violinist (born 1937)

Eberhard Feltz (born 27 June 1937) is a German classical violinist and chamber music pedagogue. Feltz became internationally known especially as a mentor for string quartets and chamber music ensembles. He is often called the "guru of the string quartet".

== Life ==
Feltz was born in Königsberg in 1937. His family was expelled from Königsberg in 1945 after the end of the war. Feltz began playing the violin at the age of seven. He studied violin in Berlin with Werner Scholz, later in St. Petersburg with Michail Waiman.

Feltz began to teach violin and chamber music in 1963 at the Hochschule für Musik "Hanns Eisler". In 1985, he was appointed professor for violin and chamber music. Feltz is in great demand as a lecturer for chamber music master classes. He is a regular guest teacher at the Davos Festival, the Heidelberger Frühling or at the Dutch String Quartet Academy. Feltz often assumes responsibility on juries of chamber music competitions such as the Felix Mendelssohn Bartholdy Hochschulwettbewerb of the Prussian Cultural Heritage Foundation in Berlin, the competition Schubert und die Musik der Moderne in Graz or the International Chamber Music Competition in Hamburg.

As a mentor of chamber music ensembles, Feltz initially supported the Vogler Quartet, later the Berlin Kuss Quartet and Atrium String Quartet, the Dutch Rubens Quartet and the German-Estonian Schumann Quartet. In addition, he worked with the French Quatuor Ébène, the Amsterdam Busch Trio, the Dudok Quartet Amsterdam.

Feltz's book 'Genauer als Worte. Intuitives Finden – 44 Übungen' was published by Davos Festival Foundation in 2017.

== Sources ==
- Udo Badelt (2017-06-27). "Eberhard Feltz im Porträt – Musikalischer Mentor und Menschenfreund" (in German). Der Tagesspiegel. Archived from the original on 2017-06-27.
- "Feltz, Eberhard (Jurymitglied)". www.fmb-hochschulwettbewerb.de (in German). November 2019. Archived from the original on 11 June 2020.
