= Symphony No. 3 (Mendelssohn) =

Symphony by Mendelssohn-Bartholdy

Symphony No. 3 in A minor
- Scottish
- by Felix Mendelssohn
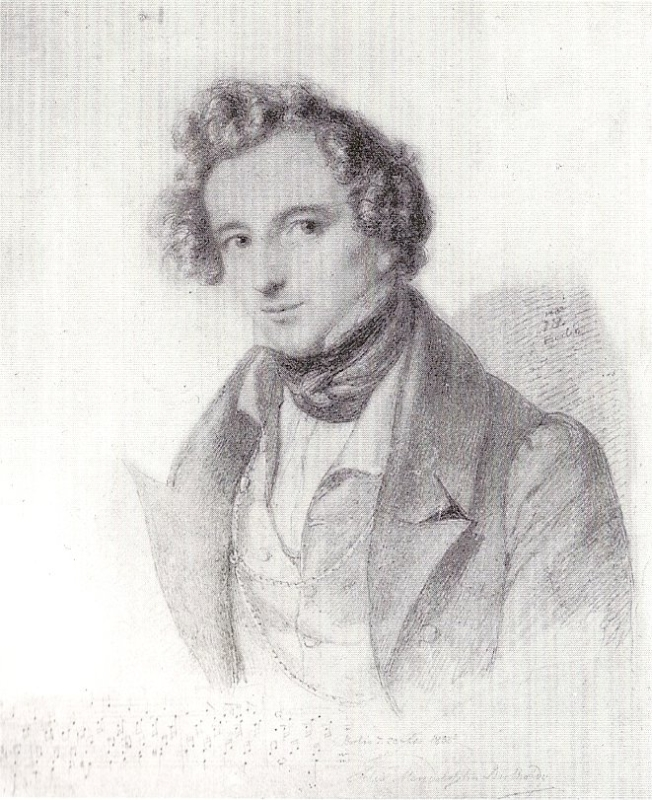
- Drawing of the composer by Eduard Bendemann, 1833
- Key: A minor
- Opus: 56
- Composed: 1829–42
- Performed: 3 March 1842
- Movements: four

The Symphony No. 3 in A minor, Op. 56, MWV N 18, known as the Scottish, is a symphony by Felix Mendelssohn, composed between 1829 and 1842.

== History ==
=== Composition ===
Mendelssohn was initially inspired to compose this symphony during his first visit to Britain in 1829. After a series of successful performances in London, Mendelssohn embarked on a walking tour of Scotland with his friend Karl Klingemann. On 30 July, Mendelssohn visited the ruins of Holyrood Chapel at Holyrood Palace in Edinburgh, where, as he related to his family in a letter, he received his initial inspiration for the piece:

In the deep twilight we went today to the palace where Queen Mary lived and loved...The chapel below is now roofless. Grass and ivy thrive there and at the broken altar where Mary was crowned Queen of Scotland. Everything is ruined, decayed, and the clear heavens pour in. I think I have found there the beginning of my "Scottish" Symphony.

Alongside this description, Mendelssohn enclosed in his letter a scrap of paper with the opening bars of what would become the symphony's opening theme. A few days later Mendelssohn and his companion visited the western coast of Scotland and the island of Staffa, which in turn inspired the composer to start the Hebrides. After completing the first version of the Hebrides, Mendelssohn continued to work on his initial sketches of what would become Symphony No. 3 while touring Italy. However, he struggled to make progress, and after 1831 set the piece aside.

It is not known exactly when Mendelssohn resumed work on the symphony (sketches suggest he may have returned to the first movement in the late 1830s) but he was certainly working in earnest on the piece by 1841 and completed the symphony in Berlin on 20 January 1842. It was slightly revised after early performances, excising 111 bars of material in total, and the revised version is the one almost universally performed. Although it was the fifth and final of Mendelssohn's symphonies to be completed, it was the third to be published, and has subsequently been known as Symphony No. 3. Intriguingly, despite describing the work as his 'Scottish Symphony' to his family in 1829, by the time the work was published in 1842 Mendelssohn never publicly called attention to the symphony's Scottish inspiration, and it is debatable whether he intended the finished work to be considered 'Scottish'. Ever since the Scottish provenance became known following the composer's death, however, audiences have found it hard not to hear the piece as evoking the wild Romantic landscapes of the north – even if such picturesque associations have caused audiences to overlook the many other musical qualities of this symphony.

=== Premiere ===
The premiere took place on 3 March 1842 in the Leipzig Gewandhaus.

== Instrumentation ==
The work is scored for an orchestra consisting of two flutes, two oboes, two clarinets in B flat and A, two bassoons, four horns (two in C and A, two in E, F and D), two trumpets in D, timpani, and strings.

== Form ==
I. Andante con moto – Allegro un poco agitato

II. Vivace non troppo

III. Adagio

IV. Allegro vivacissimo – Allegro maestoso assai
Performed by the Musopen Symphony Orchestra

Mendelssohn's symphony is in four interconnected movements, all in sonata form:

1. Andante con moto – Allegro un poco agitato (in A minor)
2. Vivace non troppo (in F major)
3. Adagio (in A major)
4. Allegro vivacissimo – Allegro maestoso assai (in A minor → A major)

Unusually, Mendelssohn marked the movements to be performed without breaks, and underlined the connection between the symphony's parts by making them grow from the continual thematic transformation of the original idea he had notated in 1829, presented in the slow introduction to the first movement. Despite the overriding concern for musical unity, the emotional scope of the work is wide, consisting of a dark and stormy first movement, a joyous and fairly brief second movement, a slow movement maintaining an apparent struggle between love and fate, and a finale that takes its components from Scottish folk dance.

The lively second movement is melodically and rhythmically in the style of Scottish folk music, using the notes of the pentatonic scale and the characteristic Scotch snap rhythm, although no direct quotations have ever been identified. A novel feature lies in the coda of the finale, where Mendelssohn introduces a new majestic theme in A major to close the work in a contrasting manner to the rest of the A minor finale. Akin to a victory hymn and intended by Mendelssohn to allude to a male-voice choir, this ending returns to the balladic tone of the first movement's introduction, transforming the material of the original inspiration for the piece Mendelssohn had twelve years before.

Contemporary musicians such as Robert Schumann found the effect highly poetic, though some later twentieth-century critics have shown aversion to the 'happy ending'. The conductor Otto Klemperer, for instance, disliked this coda and wrote his own ending in a vein similar to the general character of the movement. Recordings of him conducting both endings are available. Removing the maestoso coda strongly alters the cyclic structure Mendelssohn has created across the symphony's four movements and nowadays critics are more inclined to recognize the composer's original and lasting contribution to the nineteenth-century symphony.
