= International Chamber Music Competition Hamburg =

The International Chamber Music Competition Hamburg (ICMC Hamburg) has been held in Hamburg, Germany since September 2009. The competition takes place every three years and is for performers of two types of chamber music, String Quartet and Piano Trio.

Director of the International Chamber Music Competition Hamburg is Prof. Niklas Schmidt who is teaching cello at the Hochschule für Musik und Theater Hamburg and was one of the founders of the former Trio Fontenay. Project leader of the competition is the cultural manager Jan Wulf.

== Venues ==
- Rolf-Liebermann-Studio des Norddeutschen Rundfunks (NDR)
- Forum der Hochschule für Musik und Theater Hamburg
- Mozartsaal im Logenhaus Hamburg
