= Tetzlaff Quartet =

The Tetzlaff Quartet is a German string quartet ensemble formed in 1994. The quartet has released four CD recordings, of which their 2014 recording of Berg's Lyric Suite and the Mendelssohn Quartet Op. 13 received a Diapason d'Or award and was an Editor's Choice for Gramophone magazine.

== Members ==
The current members of the quartet are:

- Christian Tetzlaff - first violin
- Elisabeth Kufferath - second violin
- Hanna Weinmeister - viola
- Tanja Tetzlaff - cello

== Discography ==
- Sibelius & Schoenberg: String Quartets (2010). Avi-music AVI8553202
- Mendelssohn Quartet Op. 13 - Berg Lyric Suite (2014). Avi-music AVI8553266
- Schubert-Haydn: String Quartets (2017). Ondine ODE 1293-2
- Beethoven: String Quartets Opp. 132 & 130/133 (2020). Ondine ODE 1347-2D
