= Doric String Quartet =

English string quartet

Doric Quartet
- Origin: United Kingdom
- Years active: 1998–present
- Label: Chandos
- Members: Ying Xue; Emma Wernig; John Myerscough
- Past members: Helene Clement; Jonathan Stone; Alex Redington; Maia Cabeza

The Doric String Quartet is a string quartet based in the UK. It was formed in 1998. As of 2026, the members are Ying Xue on 2nd violin, Emma Wernig on viola and John Myerscough on cello. Past members include Maia Cabeza (violin; 2024-2026), Alex Redington (violin; 1998–2024), Hélène Clément (viola; 2013–2024), Jonathan Stone (violin; 1998–2018), Simon Tandree (viola; 2004–2013) and Chris Brown (viola; 1998–2004). In 2008, the quartet won first prize at the Osaka International Chamber Music Competition and second prize at the "Premio Paolo Borciani" International String Quartet Competition.

Their repertoire includes Haydn, Beethoven, Schubert, Mendelssohn, Schumann, Bartók, Janáček, Korngold and Britten, as well as the work of contemporary composers such as John Adams, Thomas Adès and Brett Dean. They have given premieres of works by Dean, Peter Maxwell Davies and Donnacha Dennehy. The Doric is Teaching Quartet in Association with the Royal Academy of Music (from 2015) and artistic director of the Mendelssohn on Mull Festival (from 2018). They have recorded for Chandos since 2009.

== Members ==
The original quartet comprised Alex Redington and Jonathan Stone (violins), Chris Brown (viola) and John Myerscough (cello). There have been some changes in the line-up over the years: Hélène Clément replaced Tandree on viola in 2013, and Ying Xue replaced Stone as second violin in 2018. In 2024, Maia Cabeza replaced Alex Redington on 1st violin and Emma Wernig replaced Hélène Clément.

The current members are:

- Ying Xue, violin: Chinese-born violinist; formerly with the Parker Quartet
- Emma Wernig, viola: American-born, German-Austrian violist
- John Myerscough, cello

== History ==
The quartet was formed for a London String Quartet Foundation symposium, although Redington, Brown and Myerscough already knew each other having attended Pro Corda in Suffolk together as children. They gained early exposure after winning the Bristol Millennium Chamber Music Competition at the age of eighteen, which led to a residency at the Wiltshire Music Centre. From 2002, the Doric studied with ProQuartet in Paris with the Alban Berg, Artemis and LaSalle quartets, and, after separately attending music colleges, they came to the attention of the Young Concert Artists Trust in 2006, where they were advised by Alasdair Tait. Early concerts in the UK include at the Wigmore Hall in London in 2004. The quartet won first prize at the 2008 Osaka International Chamber Music Competition and second prize at the "Premio Paolo Borciani" International String Quartet Competition.

The quartet toured Japan in the 2008–9 season, after winning the Osaka competition. Their American debut came in 2010, with concerts in New York and Washington, and they have since visited the USA annually. They first toured Australia in 2019.

The Australian composer Brett Dean wrote his String Quartet No. 3, Hidden Agendas, for the Doric. In 2010, the quartet premiered Peter Maxwell Davies's Blake Dreaming at the Wigmore Hall, with the baritone Roderick Williams; and in 2015 or 2016, they premiered Donnacha Dennehy's The Weather of It, also at the Wigmore. They were conducted by John Adams in his Absolute Jest for String Quartet and Orchestra, a "staggeringly challenging" piece which makes "fearsome demands" on the quartet.

After the lifting of the coronavirus lockdown in 2020, the quartet gave the first concert at the Wigmore Hall to have an in-house audience, with a programme of Mozart and Britten. In 2022, the Doric performed the complete set of Bartók quartets over three concerts on a single day at the Aldeburgh Festival; Ivan Hewett, in a Telegraph review, described the concerts as "wonderful because they simply revealed the music in all its rich humanity, and gave it a special intimate quality I'd never been aware of before."

The Doric is Teaching Quartet in Association with the Royal Academy of Music (from 2015). In the period 2018-2023 the quartet took on the role of artistic director of the Mendelssohn on Mull Festival on the Isle of Mull.

== Repertoire and style ==
The quartet's main repertoire includes Haydn, Beethoven, Schubert and works by early romantic composers such as Mendelssohn and Schumann; 20th-century works particularly by Bartók, Janáček, Korngold and Britten; and works by living composers such as Thomas Adès and Brett Dean. In 2016–17, the quartet began to use Classical (transitional-period) bows made by Luis Emilio Rodriguez Carrington for repertoire as late as Mendelssohn. Myerscough states that while the Classical bows generate a quieter sound and require more work from the player, they increase the clarity, responsiveness and range of articulation.

Toby Deller, writing in The Strad, characterises the Doric's work as having "clearly shaped phrasing, clean articulation, distinct voicing and uncannily immaculate ensemble playing". Charles T. Downey, in a concert review for the Washington Post, praised the quartet's almost perfect cohesion, and highlighted their "knife-edged ... clean, almost strident sound", which he attributed to a lack of vibrato. Harriet Smith, in a recording review for Gramophone magazine, singled out the Doric's "ability to reveal detail, though never at the cost of broader spans" as well as "their elasticity of phrasing, combined with an absolute confidence of ensemble without ever seeming overly obsessed with it". Paul Driverby, writing in The Sunday Times, described the Doric's playing as "flamboyant when called for, but not otherwise; vibrato sparing but beautiful; ensemble impeccable – a true togetherness." Richard Wigmore, reviewing their series of Haydn recordings for Gramophone, describes them as "technically impeccable, commanding a wide palette of colour and dynamics" but states "they can be uncommonly free over tempo, occasionally to the point of mannerism." Philip Clark, in a review of Haydn for Limelight magazine, notes that the quartet chooses not to deliver a traditional Classical performance but rather a "re-examination" of the works, writing that they "splash around wideband dynamics and proto-expressionistic timbres with ... obvious abandon".

== Recordings ==
The Doric's earliest disc was a live recording of Haydn, under the Wigmore Hall Live label, which was described in a Gramophone review as a "very auspicious recording debut". Since 2009 the quartet has recorded for the British label Chandos, starting with Korngold's quartets and including an ongoing cycle of Haydn quartets. In 2011, the Doric made the first recording of the original uncut first string quartet of William Walton. They made the second recording of Adams's Absolute Jest in 2017 and have recorded works by Dean, including his quintet with Dean on viola.

In 2018, they recorded the complete Britten string quartets at Snape Maltings, Aldeburgh, for which Clément was loaned the composer's own viola, an 1843 Giussani, by the Britten–Pears Foundation. She describes the instrument as having a "wonderfully light quality", an "expressive A string" and an "extremely rich and full" tone, with a "bright quality". During its association with the Mendelssohn on Mull Festival, the quartet recorded Mendelssohn's six string quartets, as well as the composer's two quintets with the violist Timothy Ridout. According to Misha Donat in BBC Music Magazine, no Mendelssohn lover should be without the string quintet disc.

== Discography ==
Sources:

- Haydn: String Quartets Op. 9 No. 4, Op. 50 No. 1, Op. 76 No. 1 (Wigmore Hall Live; 2009)
- Korngold: The String Quartets (Chandos; 2010)
- Walton: String Quartets (Chandos; 2011)
- Schumann: String Quartets, Op. 41 (Chandos; 2011)
- Schubert: String Quartets "Rosamunde", "Death and the Maiden" (Chandos; 2012)
- Korngold: String Sextet, Piano Quintet with Jennifer Stumm (viola), Bartholomew Lafollette (cello), Kathryn Stott (piano) (Chandos; 2012)
- Chausson: Concert for Violin, Piano and String Quartet, String Quartet with Jennifer Pike (violin), Tom Poster (piano) (Chandos; 2013)
- Haydn: String Quartets, Op. 20 (Chandos; 2014)
- Janáček: String Quartet Nos 1, 2; Martinů: String Quartet No. 3 (Chandos; 2015)
- Brett Dean: Epitaphs, Eclipse (String Quartet No. 1), String Quartet No. 2, "And Once I Played Ophelia" with Brett Dean (viola), Allison Bell (soprano) (Chandos; 2015)
- Haydn: String Quartets, Op. 76 (Chandos; 2016)
- Elgar: Introduction and Allegro for String Quartet and String Orchestra with the BBC Symphony Orchestra conducted by Edward Gardner (Chandos; 2017)
- Schubert: String Quartet in G major, String Quartet in C minor "Quartettsatz" (Chandos; 2017)
- Bracing Change: Donnacha Dennehy: The Weather of It (with other works) (NMC; 2017)
- John Adams: Naive And Sentimental Music, Absolute Jest with the Royal Scottish National Orchestra conducted by Peter Oundjian (Chandos; 2018)
- Haydn: String Quartets, Op. 64 (Chandos; 2018)
- Mendelssohn: String Quartets in E Flat major, Op. 12, E Flat major, Op. 44 No. 3, F Minor, Op. 80 (Chandos; 2018)
- Purcell: String Fantasias in Four Parts; Britten: String Quartets Nos 1–3, Three Divertimenti (Chandos; 2019)
- Haydn: String Quartets, Op. 33 (Chandos; 2020)
- Mendelssohn: String Quartets, No. 2, Op. 13, No. 3, Op. 44 No. 1, No. 4, Op. 44 No. 2 (Chandos; 2021)
- Bax, Bliss, Delius, Finzi, Vaughan Williams: British Oboe Quintets with Nicholas Daniel (oboe, cor anglais) (Chandos; 2021)
- Mozart: The Prussian Quartets (Chandos; 2021)
- Mendelssohn: The String Quintets with Timothy Ridout (Chandos; 2022)
- Beethoven: String Quartets Vol. 3, String Quartet No. 3 in D major, Op. 18 No. 3, String Quartet No. 9 in C major, Op. 59 No. 3, String Quartet No. 15 in A minor, Op. 132, String Quartet No. 16 in F major, Op. 135 (Chandos CD CHAN20320(2))
