= Kuss Quartet =

German string quartet

The Kuss Quartet with Jana Kuss (violin), Oliver Wille (violin), William Coleman (viola) and Mikayel Hakhnazaryan (cello) is a Berlin-based string quartet. It was founded in 1991 at the Hochschule für Musik "Hanns Eisler" by the two violinists of the ensemble and has been playing in its current formation since 2008.

== History ==
Among the teachers of the Kuss Quartet were Walter Levin, Christoph Poppen, Eberhard Feltz, and the Alban Berg Quartet. During the 2001/02 season, the quartet accepted an invitation from Paul Katz of the Cleveland Quartet to study at the New England Conservatory of Music in Boston, where they completed the Graduate Diploma Program for string quartet. The ensemble made its debut in 1993 at the Palace Concert of German President Richard von Weizsäcker.

== Awards ==
The Quartet won international prizes at the Bubenreuth Competition (1997), the Karl-Klingler Competition (Berlin, 1998) and the International String Quartet Competition in Banff (Canada, 2001). In June 2002, the Kuss Quartet was awarded 1st prize at the International String Quartet Competition Premio Paolo Borciani in Reggio Emilia/Italy. At the same time as the Borciani competition, the ECHO (European Concert Halls Organisation) decided to award the Kuss Quartet the title of German Artist of the Rising Stars Programme. As a result, the Quartet made its debut in the 2003/04 season at the Royal Concertgebouw in Amsterdam, the Vienna Konzerthaus, Carnegie Hall, the Athens Concert Hall and the Birmingham Symphony Hall. The quartet was also supported by the Borletti-Buitoni Trust.

Since then, it has been one of the established ensembles of its generation, giving concerts in Europe, the US, South America and Japan.

The Kuss Quartet has played with chamber music partners such as the singer Mojca Erdmann, the cellist Miklós Perényi, the clarinettists Sharon Kam and Paul Meyer. It has developed special concert formats such as the classical music lounge at the Watergate Club, the discussion concerts "Explica" and programmes combining literature and music with the actor Udo Samel.

== Recordings ==
- Oehms Classics: Mendelssohn/Mozart Streichquartette (2006)
- Sony Classical: Bridges – Renaissance und Moderne (2007)
- Sony Classical: Haydn: Streichquartette
- Onyx: Schubert/Berg (2011)
- Onyx: Thème russe (2012)
- Onyx: Schubert String Quintet C Major (2013)
- Onyx: Brahms/Schönberg (with Mojca Erdmann, 2016)
- Rubicon: Beethoven complete string quartets (2020)
