= Danel Quartet =

French/Belgian string quartet

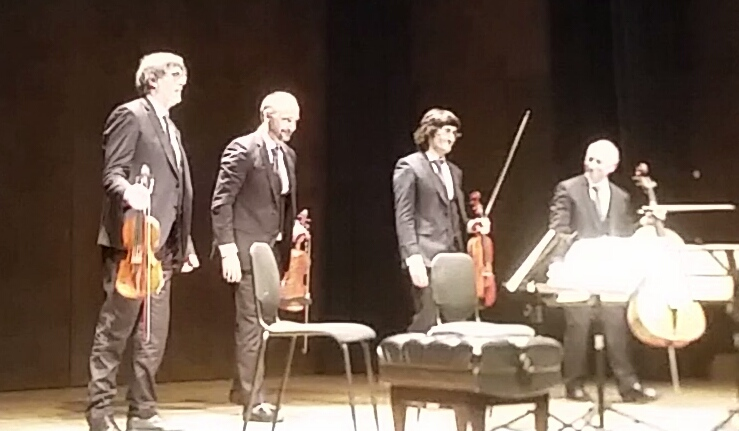
Danel Quartet in 2017 in Montréal.

The Danel Quartet (or Quatuor Danel) is a French/Belgian string quartet established in June 1991. Known for classical, early modern and contemporary repertoire, they tour internationally and have an extensive discography. They have both recorded and performed the first complete cycle of string quartets by Mieczysław Weinberg and have undertaken a complete cycle of the quartets of Dmitri Shostakovich as well.

== History ==
The ensemble has worked with the Amadeus Quartet. For Shostakovich's complete string quartets, it worked with the Borodin Quartet and Fyodor Druzhinin of the Beethoven Quartet and also with Pierre Penassou and Walter Levin, both members of the LaSalle Quartet. The Danel Quartet performs the classical repertoire as well as contemporary music. They are specialized in the Russian repertoire. Their recordings of Shostakovich's and Weinberg's quartets (world premiere) are a reference.

Since 2005, the Danel Quartet has been "Quartet in Residence" at the University of Manchester, and since 2016, in residence at TivoliVredenburg, Utrecht. From 2019 to 2021, they were in residence at the Wigmore Hall for a complete double of Shostakovich and Weinberg's string quartets.

During the Bruckner Year 2024, the Danel Quartet performed on 1 October an integral of the compositions for string quartet, which Anton Bruckner composed between 1861 and 1863 during his lessons with Otto Kitzler – including a premiere four of the Six Scherzos for string quartet, WAB 209.

== Members ==
- Marc Danel – first violin (since 1991)
- Gilles Milet – second violin (since 1991)
- Vlad Bogdanas – viola (since 2005)
- Yovan Markovitch – cello (since 2013)

== Premieres ==
- Olivier Greif, String quartet No 2 (1996)
- Krzysztof Meyer, String quartet No 14 « Au-delà de l'absence » (1998)
- Alexander Raskatov, Gebet for soprano and String quartet (1998)
- Bruno Mantovani, les fées string quartet
- Bruno Mantovani, Quintet with harp
- Bruno Mantovani, Quintet with 2 cellos
- Wolfgang Rihm, Sextet for clarinet, horn and string quartet

== Discography ==
- Prokofiev: The String Quartets (2025, Accentus Music)
- Dmitri Shostakovich – complete string quartets (October 2001 – June 2005, 5CD Fuga libera FUG512 / Alpha) OCLC 811455133
- Peter Swinnen, Lydia Chagoll – La vieille dame et la fille nomade (Artist consultancy DIS 001)
- Ahmet Adnan Saygun – complete string quartets (1–4 December 2003/20-22 September/19 November 2004, 2CD CPO 999 923-2) OCLC 315127627
- Pascal Dusapin, René Koering – String quartets (May 2003, Accord 476 1919) OCLC 60819508
- Hao-Fu Zhang – Qia-Xiao (June 2002/May 2003/February 2004, Cypres CYP4617) OCLC 228475722
- Felix Mendelssohn – String quartets, op. 44, No 1 and 2 (Eufoda 1355)
- Elmar Lampson – Fadenkreuze (Col Legno 20 234) OCLC 237881188
- Adolphe Biarent – Quintet with piano (Cypres CYP4611)
- André Souris – Musics (Cypres CYP4610)
- Benoît Mernier – Les idées heureuses (1997/2001, Cypres CYP4613) OCLC 56563794
- Charles Gounod – String quartets (January 1997, Auvidis V4798) OCLC 38553717
- Manuel Rosenthal – Chamber music (1996, Calliope, Karel Goeyvaerts – Chamber music (December 1995/January 1996, Megadisc MDC 7853) OCLC 35308811
- Patrick De Clerck – Chamber music (May/June 1994, Megadisc MDC 7866) OCLC 37838806
- Nicolas Bacri – Chamber music (REM 311 276XCD)
- Alexandre Raskatov – Chamber music (Megadisc MDC 7825)
- Mieczysław Weinberg – complete string quartets (CPO) — World premieres of quartets 3, 4 and 6
- César Franck – quartets and quintets with piano with Paavali Jumppanen (CPO)

== Bibliography ==
- Pâris, Alain (2004). Dictionnaire des interprètes et de l'interprétation musicale depuis 1900. Bouquins (in French). Paris: Éditions Robert Laffont. p. 1289. ISBN 2-221-10214-2. OCLC 300283821. Pâris 2004.
