= List of music festivals in the United States =

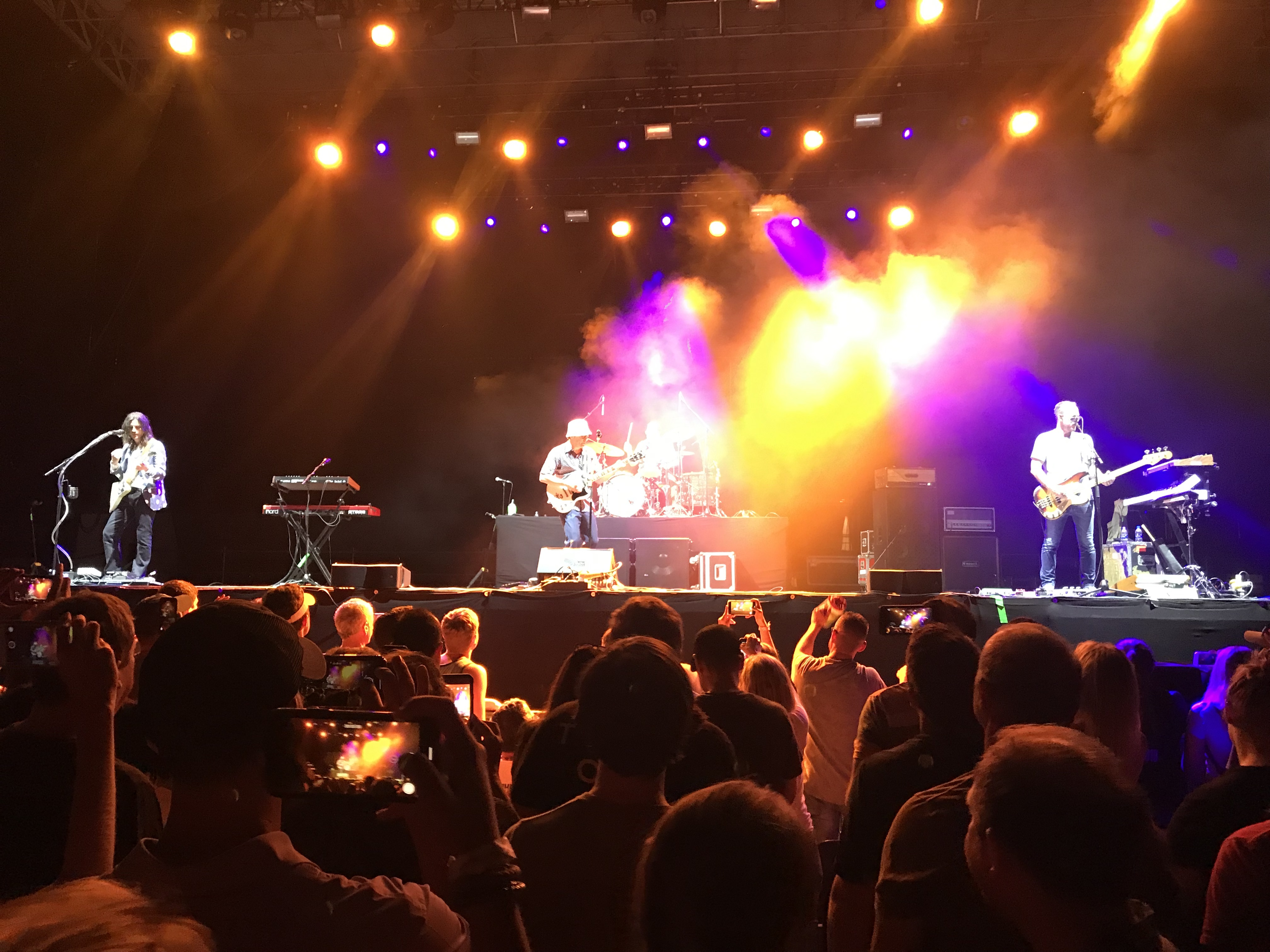
Musikfest, an eleven-day outdoor music festival held annually each August in Bethlehem, Pennsylvania, is the largest free music festival in the United States, drawing over 1.3 million attendees.

This is a list of music festivals in the United States organized by state and then by name. It includes current and past notable festivals.

== Touring festivals ==
- Electric Daisy Carnival
- Identity Festival
- Knotfest
- Made in America Festival
- Mayhem Festival
- Ozzfest
- Rock the Bells
- Rock the Country
- Rolling Loud
- Warped Tour
- Winter Jam Tour Spectacular

== Alabama ==
- Bayfest, Mobile
- Big Spring Jam, Huntsville
- Furnace Fest, Birmingham
- Hangout Music Fest, Gulf Shores

== Arizona ==
- DUSK Music Festival, Tucson

== Arkansas ==
- King Biscuit Blues Festival, Helena

== California ==
- Altamont Free Concert, Altamont Speedway, Tracy
- BottleRock Napa Valley, Napa
- Camp Flog Gnaw Carnival, Los Angeles
- Coachella Valley Music and Arts Festival, Indio
- CRSSD Festival, San Diego
- Extravaganza, Santa Barbara
- Hardly Strictly Bluegrass, San Francisco
- High Sierra Music Festival, Quincy
- How Weird Street Faire, San Francisco
- JazzReggae Festival @ UCLA, Los Angeles
- Long Beach Blues Festival, Long Beach
- Mendocino Music Festival, Mendocino
- Ojai Music Festival, Ojai
- Other Minds Festival, San Francisco
- Outside Lands Music and Arts Festival, San Francisco
- Reggae on the River, Humboldt County
- Reggae Rising, Humboldt County
- Rock of Ages Festival, Calistoga
- Stagecoach Festival, Indio
- Stern Grove Festival, San Francisco
- Treasure Island Music Festival, San Francisco
- Camp Flog Gnaw, Los Angeles

== Colorado ==
- Aspen Music Festival and School, Aspen
- Mile High Music Festival, Commerce City
- Snowball music festival, Avon
- Telluride Bluegrass Festival, Telluride

== Connecticut ==
- Gathering of the Vibes, Bridgeport
- Music Mountain Summer Chamber Music Festival, Falls Village
- Norfolk Music Festival, Norfolk

== Delaware ==
- Firefly Music Festival, Dover
- Weedstock, Townsend

== Florida ==
- Electric Daisy Carnival, Orlando
- Harvest of Hope Fest, Saint Augustine
- Langerado Music Festival, Sunrise
- SunFest, West Palm Beach
- Tortuga Music Festival, Fort Lauderdale
- Okeechobee Music & Arts Festival, Okeechobee
- Ultra Music Festival, Miami
- Welcome to Rockville, Daytona Beach

== Georgia ==
- Athfest, Athens
- Music Midtown, Atlanta
- Shaky Knees, Atlanta
- Shaky Beats, Atlanta
- The Echo Project, Atlanta
- TomorrowWorld, Chattahoochee Hill

== Hawaii ==
- Aloha Festivals, Makahiki
- Merrie Monarch Festival, Hilo

== Idaho ==
- Treefort Music Fest, Boise

== Illinois ==
- Chicago Blues Festival, Chicago
- Chicago Jazz Festival, Chicago
- Intonation Music Festival, Chicago
- Lollapalooza, Chicago
- North Coast Music Festival, Chicago
- Pitchfork Music Festival, Chicago
- Pygmalion Music Festival, Champaign-Urbana
- Riot Fest, Chicago
- Spring Awakening, Chicago
- Summer Camp Music Festival, Chillicothe

== Indiana ==
- Addicott Summer Chamber Music Festival, South Bend
- Masterworks festival, Winona Lake
- Michigan City Chamber Music Festival, Michigan City
- Notre Dame Collegiate Jazz Festival, Notre Dame
- World Pulse Festival, South Bend

== Iowa ==
- 515 Alive, Des Moines
- 80/35 Music Festival, Des Moines
- Bix Beiderbecke Memorial Jazz Festival, Davenport
- Hinterland Music Festival, St. Charles, Iowa
- Knotfest, Indianola
- Lazerfest, Des Moines
- Saturday in the Park, Sioux City

== Kansas ==
- Electronic Music Midwest, Kansas City
- Heartland Stampede Music Festival, Topeka and Manhattan
- Katy Days Festival, Parsons
- Wakarusa Music and Camping Festival, Lawrence
- Walnut Valley Festival, Winfield

== Kentucky ==
- Forecastle Festival, Louisville
- Hot August Blues Festival, Aurora
- Louder Than Life, Louisville

== Louisiana ==
- Bayou Country Superfest, Baton Rouge
- BUKU Music + Art Project, New Orleans
- Essence Music Festival, New Orleans
- Festival International de Louisiane, Lafayette
- French Quarter Festival, New Orleans
- New Orleans Jazz and Heritage Festival, New Orleans
- Voodoo Music Experience, New Orleans

== Maine ==
- Bay Chamber Concerts, Rockport
- Bowdoin International Music Festival, Brunswick
- KahBang Music and Art Festival, Bangor, Portland
- Nateva Music & Camping Festival, Oxford

== Maryland ==
- All Things Go Music Festival, Columbia
- Delfest, Cumberland
- Moonrise Festival, Baltimore
- Takoma Park Folk Festival, Takoma Park
- Virgin Festival, Baltimore

== Michigan ==
- Electric Forest Festival, Rothbury
- Faster Horses Festival, Brooklyn
- Michigan Womyn's Music Festival, Hart

== Minnesota ==
- 10,000 Lakes Festival, Detroit Lakes
- Basilica Block Party, Minneapolis
- Rock the Garden, Minneapolis
- Sonshine Festival, Willmar
- Soundset Music Festival, Minneapolis-Saint Paul

== Mississippi ==
- Atwood Music Festival, Monticello
- Jimmie Rodgers Music Festival, Meridian

== Missouri ==
- LouFest, St. Louis
- Missouri Chamber Music Festival, Webster Groves
- Opera Theatre of Saint Louis, St. Louis
- Ozark Music Festival, Sedalia
- Paint Louis, St. Louis
- Pointfest, Maryland Heights
- Roots N Blues Festival, Columbia
- Schwagstock, Shannon County
- Twilight Festival, Columbia

== Nebraska ==
- Comstock Music Festivals, Comstock
- Maha Music Festival, Omaha

== Nevada ==
- Electric Daisy Carnival, Las Vegas
- Vegoose, Las Vegas

== New Jersey ==
- The Bamboozle, East Rutherford
- Sea.Hear.Now Festival, Asbury Park

== New York ==
- Bard Music Festival, Annandale-on-Hudson
- Belleayre Music Festival, Catskill Mountains
- Camp Bisco, Albany
- Caramoor Summer Music Festival, Katonah
- Electric Zoo, New York City
- Falcon Ridge Folk Festival, Hillsdale
- The Fest for Beatles Fans, New York metropolitan area
- Finger Lakes GrassRoots Festival of Music and Dance, Trumansburg
- Governors Ball Music Festival, Randall's Island
- Grey Fox Bluegrass Festival, Oak Hill
- HONK!, New York City
- Jazz at the Lake: Lake George Jazz Weekend, Lake George
- KlezKamp, Catskill Mountains
- Maverick Concerts, Woodstock
- moe.down, Turin
- Mountain Jam, Hunter
- Move Music Festival, Albany
- Music from Salem, Washington County
- New York Summer Music Festival, Oneonta
- Old Songs Festival, Altamont
- Open Fest, Rochester
- Outrageous Universe Revival Festival (OUR Fest), Panama
- Phoenicia International Festival of the Voice, Phoenicia
- Pleasantville Music Festival, Pleasantville
- Rochester International Jazz Festival, Rochester
- Syracuse Jazz Festival, Syracuse
- The Great Blue Heron Music Festival, Sherman
- Woodstock Festival, Bethel
- Woodstock Jazz Festival, Woodstock
- World's Largest Disco, Buffalo

== North Carolina ==
- Carolina Rebellion, Concord
- Hopscotch Music Festival, Raleigh
- Merlefest, Wilkesboro
- Moogfest, Asheville
- Signal - The Southeast Electronic Music Festival, Chapel Hill/Carrboro

== Ohio ==
- Bunbury Music Festival, Cincinnati
- MidPoint Music Festival, Cincinnati
- MusicNOW Festival, Cincinnati
- Nelsonville Music Festival, Nelsonville
- Rock N Resort Music Festival, North Lawrence
- Sonic Temple art & music festival, Columbus
- Gathering of the Juggalos, Legend Valley, Thornville

== Oklahoma ==
- Norman Music Festival, Norman
- Rocklahoma, Pryor
- Woody Guthrie Folk Festival, Okemah

== Oregon ==
- Britt Festival
- MusicfestNW, Portland
- Oregon Bach Festival
- Oregon Country Fair
- Oregon Jamboree
- PDX Pop Now!
- Pickathon
- Portland Old-Time Music Gathering
- Portland's Folk Festival
- Project Pabst
- Shady Pines Festival
- Sisters Folk Festival, Sisters
- Vortex 2020
- Vortex I
- Waterfront Blues Festival

== Pennsylvania ==
- Blast Furnace Blues Festival, Bethlehem
- Briggs Farm Blues Festival, Briggsville, Luzerne County
- Budweiser Made in America Festival, Philadelphia
- Creation Festival, Mount Union
- Flood City Music Festival, Johnstown
- Making Time ∞, Philadelphia
- Musikfest, Bethlehem
- The Peach Music Festival, Scranton
- Philadelphia Folk Festival, Harleysville
- Roots Picnic, Philadelphia

== Rhode Island ==
- Newport Folk Festival, Newport
- Newport Jazz Festival, Newport
- Newport Music Festival, Newport

== South Carolina ==
- Carolina Country Music Fest, Myrtle Beach
- Hotel Carolina, Isle of Palms

== Tennessee ==
- Beale Street Music Festival, Memphis
- Bonnaroo, Manchester
- Bristol Rhythm & Roots Reunion, Bristol, Tennessee/Virginia
- CMA Music Festival, Nashville

== Texas ==
- Austin City Limits Music Festival, Austin
- Astroworld Festival, Houston
- Free Press Summer Fest, Houston
- Fun Fun Fun Fest, Austin
- Kerrville Folk Festival, Kerrville
- Never Say Never Festival, Mission
- Old Settler's Music Festival, Driftwood
- South by Southwest, Austin

== Utah ==
- Deer Valley Music Festival, Park City
- Groovefest American Music Festival, Cedar City
- X96 Toyota Big Ass Show, Salt Lake City
- Kilby Block Party, Salt Lake City

== Vermont ==
- Marlboro Music Festival, Marlboro

== Virginia ==
- Blue Ridge Rock Festival, Danville
- Bristol Rhythm & Roots Reunion, Bristol, Tennessee/Bristol, Virginia
- FloydFest, Floyd County
- Lockn' Festival, Arrington
- Something in the Water Festival, Virginia Beach

== Washington ==
- Bumbershoot, Seattle
- Creation Festival, Enumclaw
- Decibel Festival, Seattle
- Endfest, Bremerton/George/Auburn/Seattle
- Sasquatch! Music Festival, George
- Summer Meltdown, Darrington
- Summer Solstice Parade and Pageant, Fremont, Seattle
- Watershed Music Festival, George

== Wisconsin ==
- Hoofbeat, Cadott
- Country Jam USA
- Eaux Claires
- Great River Folk Festival
- Lifest, Oshkosh
- Mile of Music, Appleton
- Rock Fest, Cadott
- Steel Bridge Songfest, Sturgeon Bay Bridge
- Summerfest, Milwaukee
