= List of chamber music festivals =

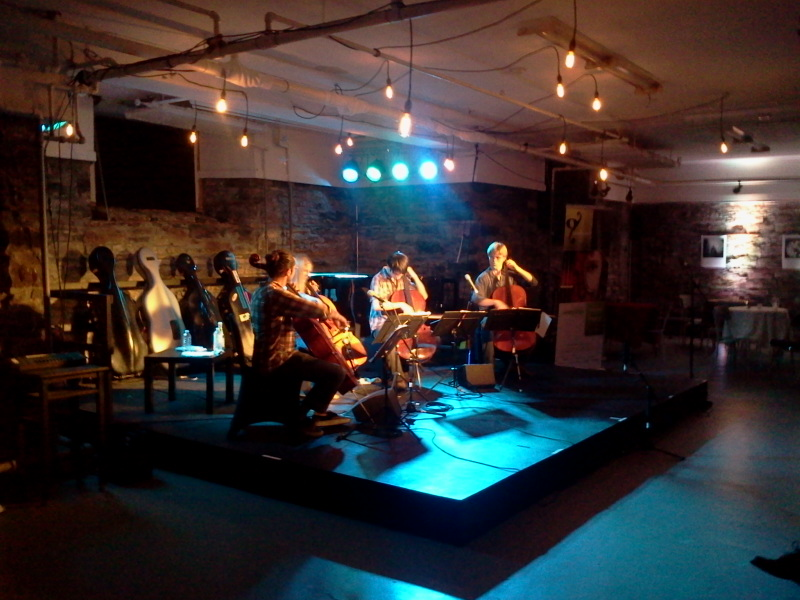
- =

General Information
- Related genres: Chamber music, classical music
- Location: Worldwide
- Related events: Category:Music festivals, concert tour, music festival, opera festivals, early music festivals, contemporary classical music festivals, experimental music festivals. old-time music festivals

The following is an incomplete list of chamber music festivals, which encapsulates music festivals focused on chamber music. Chamber music is a form of classical music that is composed for a small group of instruments—traditionally a group that could fit in a palace chamber or any small chamber. Most broadly, it includes any art music that is performed by a small number of performers, with one performer to a part. From its earliest beginnings in the Medieval period to the present, chamber music has been a reflection of the changes in the technology and the society that produced it.

== Festivals ==
Festival name	Location	Years	Notes
Addicott Summer Chamber Music Festival	South Bend, Indiana; United States	2025–present	
Anchorage Chamber Music Festival	Anchorage, Alaska; United States	2013–present	
Appalachian Chamber Music Festival	Harpers Ferry, West Virginia; United States	2021–present	
Atlantic Music Festival	Waterville, Maine; United States	2009–present	
Australian Festival of Chamber Music	Townsville; Australia	1991–present	
Bangalow Music Festival	Bangalow; Australia	2002–present	
Bridgehampton Chamber Music Festival	Bridgehampton, New York; United States	1984–present	
Chamber Music Northwest	Portland, Oregon; United States	1971–present	
Charlottesville Chamber Music Festival	Charlottesville, Virginia; United States	2000–present	
Delft Chamber Music Festival	Delft, Netherlands	1997–present	
East Neuk Festival	Fife, Scotland; United Kingdom	2004–present	
Emerald Coast Chamber Music Festival	Niceville, Florida; United States	2020–present	
GAIA Chamber Music Festival	Switzerland	2006–present	
Great Lakes Chamber Music Festival	Southfield, Michigan; United States	1994–present	
Highlands-Cashiers Chamber Music Festival	Highlands, North Carolina; United States	1981–present	
InterHarmony International Music Festival	Germany/Italy	1997–present	
International Chamber Music Festival of Cervo	Cervo, Italy	1964–present	
International Chamber Music Festival Plovdiv	Plovdiv, Bulgaria	1964–present	
International Chamber Music Festival Utrecht	Utrecht, Netherlands	2003–present	
Intonations -Chamber Music Festival Berlin	Berlin, Germany	2012-present	Intonations 2026 will take place from the 11th to the 14th of June at the KühlhausBerlin. There will be five concerts, with artistic director Elena Bashkirova joined by Martha Argerich, François Leleux, Emmanuel Pahud, Karl-Heinz Steffens, Dorothea Röschmann, Astrig Siranossian, Nabil Shehata, and more.
Kimito Island Music Festival	Kimito; Finland	1999–present	
Kingston Chamber Music Festival	Kingston, Rhode Island; United States	1989–present	
Kneisel Hall	Blue Hill, Maine; United States	1951–present	
Komorniki Festival of Organ and Chamber Music	Komorniki; Poland	2006–present	
Kuhmo Chamber Music Festival	Kuhmo; Finland	1970–present	
La Jolla Music Society SummerFest	La Jolla, California; United States	1986–present	
La Musica	Sarasota, Florida; United States	1987–present	
Lockenhaus Chamber Music Festival	Burgenland, Austria	1981–present	
Madison Chamber Music Festival	Madison, Georgia; United States	2002–present	
Marlboro Music School and Festival	Marlboro, Vermont; United States	1951–present	
Michigan City Chamber Music Festival	Michigan City, Indiana; United States	2001–present	
Missouri Chamber Music Festival	St. Louis, Missouri; United States	2010–present	
Music from Angel Fire	New Mexico; United States	1983–present	
Music@Menlo	Atherton, California; United States	2002–present	
Music Mountain Summer Chamber Music Festival	Falls Village, Connecticut; United States	1930–present	
Mendelssohn on Mull Festival	Scotland; United Kingdom	1988–present	
Newport Classical	Newport, Rhode Island; United States	1969–present	
Norfolk Chamber Music Festival	Norfolk, Connecticut; United States	1880s–present	
Olympic Music Festival	Quilcene, Washington; United States	1984–present	
Omnipresent Music Festival	New York, New York; United States	2021–present	
Orcas Island Chamber Music Festival	Eastsound, Washington; United States	1998–present	
Orfeo Music Festival	Vipiteno; Italy	2002–present	
Orvieto Musica	Orvieto; Italy	1993–present	
Ottawa Chamberfest	Ottawa; Canada	1994–present	
Park City International Music Festival	Park City, Utah; United States	1984–present	
Portland Chamber Music Festival	Portland, Oregon; United States	1994–present	
Quadra Island Festival of Chamber Music	Quathiaski Cove, Canada	2011–present	
Ravinia Steans Music Institute	Highland Park, Illinois; United States	1988–present	
Rome Chamber Music Festival	Rome; Italy	2004–present	
Rosamunde Festival	Winnipeg; Canada	2011–present	
Santa Fe Chamber Music Festival	Santa Fe, New Mexico; United States	1972–present	
Spannungen	Heimbach; Germany	1998–present	
Taos School of Music	Taos, New Mexico; United States	1960s–present	
Tuckamore Festival	St. John's, Newfoundland; Canada	2001–present	
West Cork Chamber Music Festival	West Cork; Ireland	1996–present	
Yellow Barn	Putney, Vermont; United States	1969–present	
Zephyr International Chamber Music Festival	Piemonte; Italy	2003–present	
Festival Internacional de Música de Cámara de Concepción (FimcCo)	Concepción; Chile	2025–present	

== Gallery ==
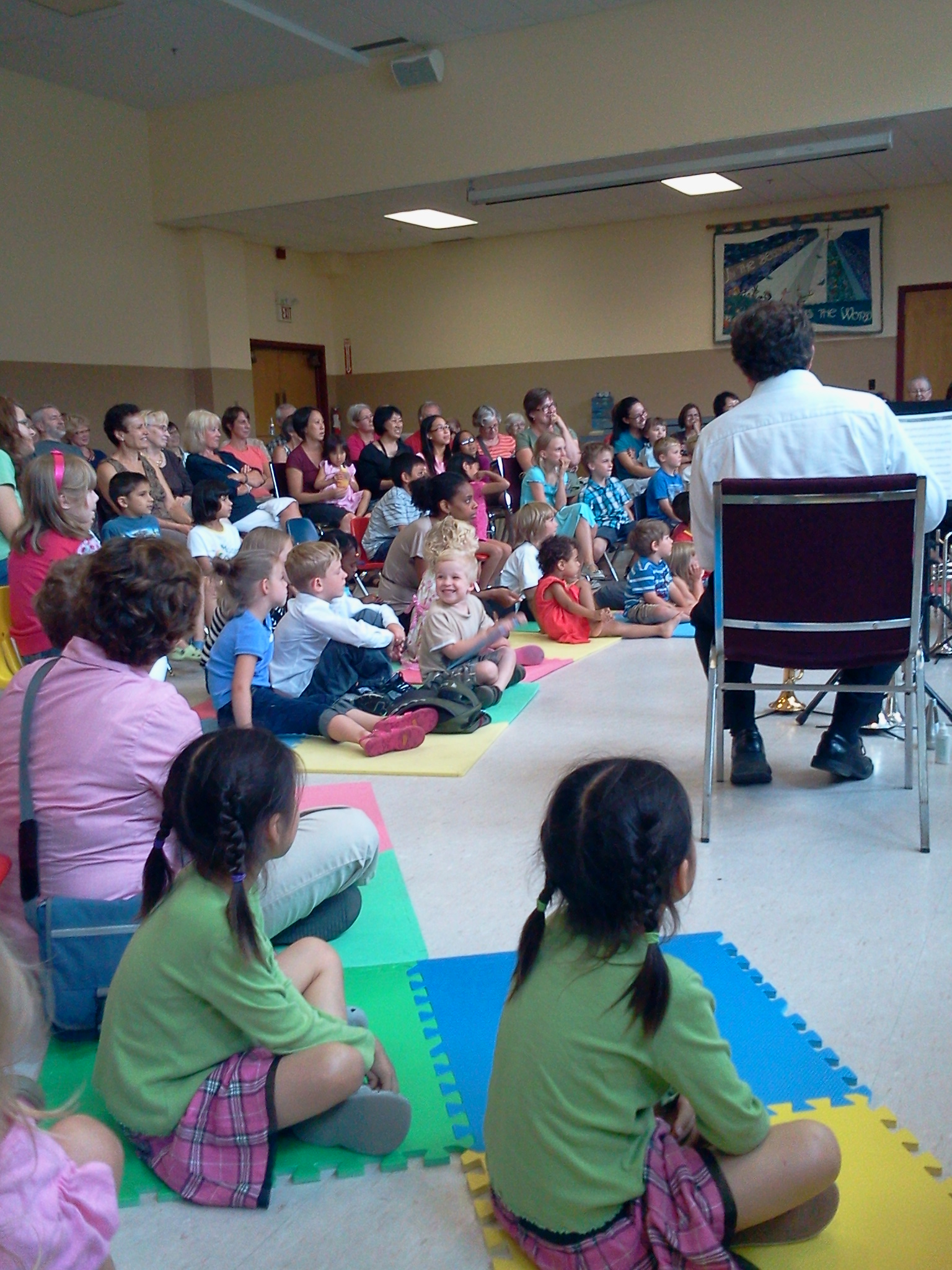

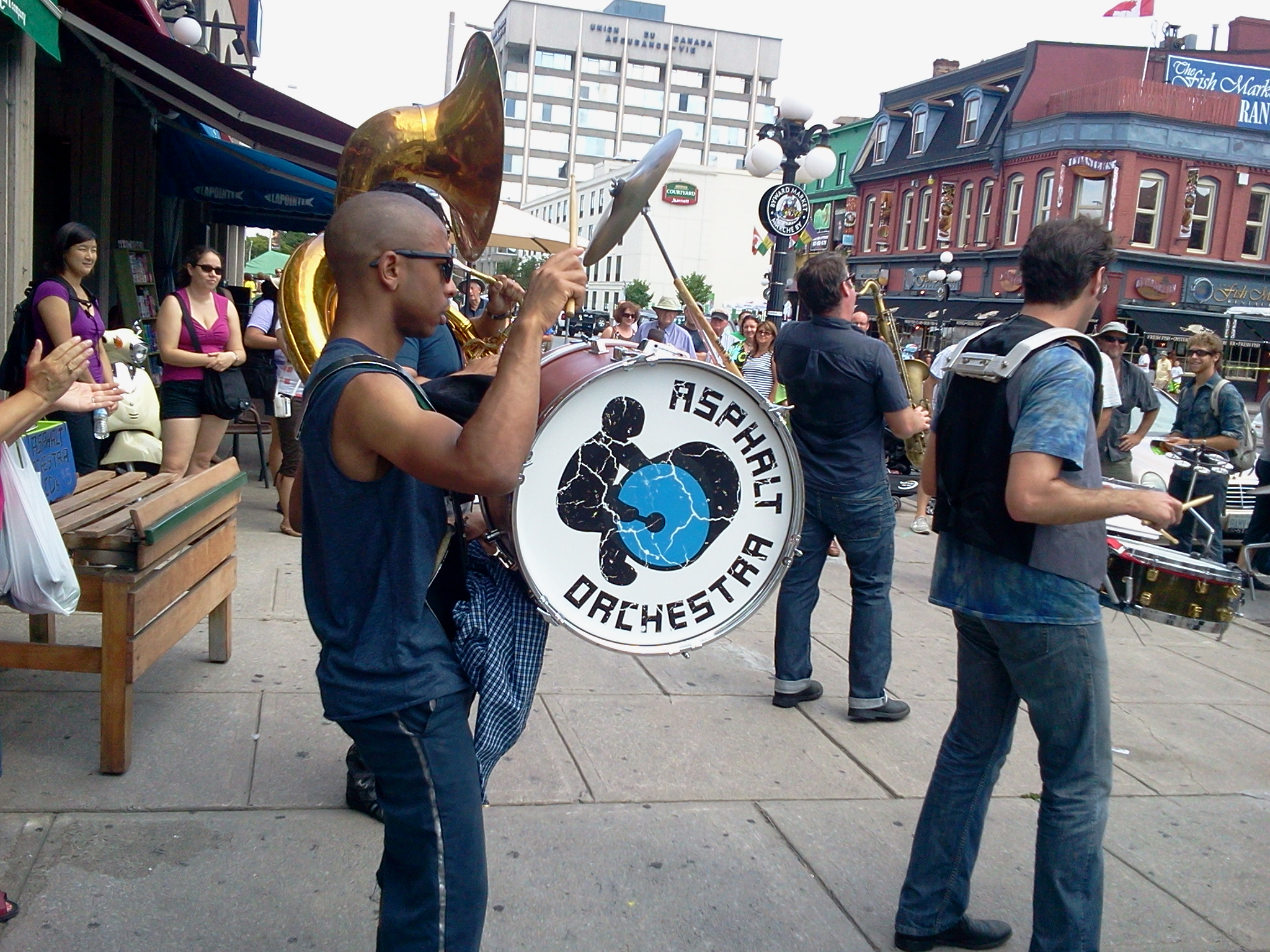

== Related lists and categories ==
The following lists have some or total overlap:

- List of classical music festivals
- List of maritime music festivals
