= BUKU Music + Art Project =

Music festival in New Orleans, US

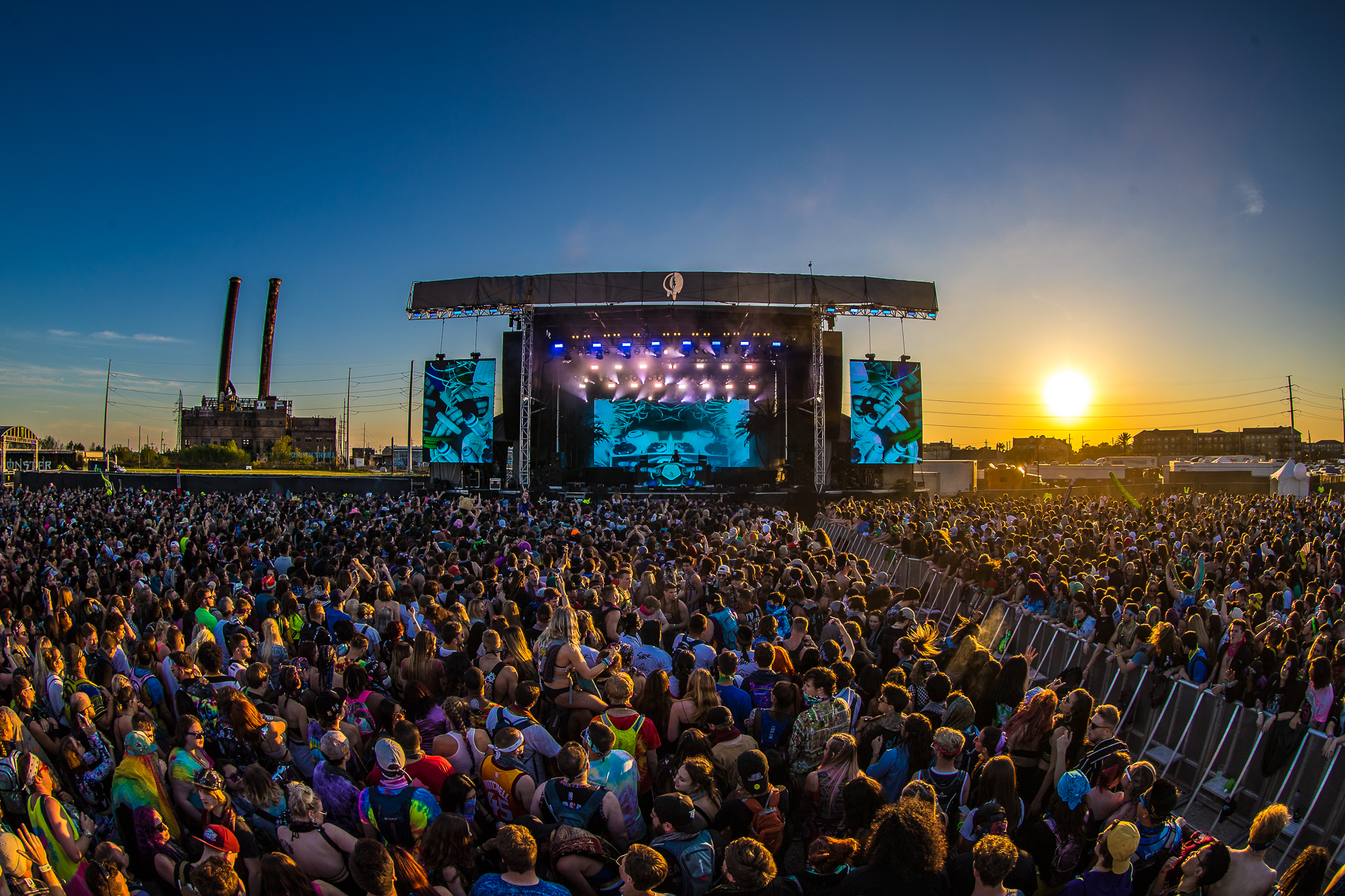
- Power Plant Stage at BUKU 2019
- Genre: Electronic dance music, Hip hop, Indie rock
- Dates: March 19–20, 2021
- Location: New Orleans
- Years active: 2012–2022
- Website: thebukuproject.com

BUKU Music + Art Project is a New Orleans–based two-day music and arts festival founded in 2012 by Winter Circle Productions and held annually at Mardi Gras World. BUKU considers itself to be a boutique event that delivers a big festival punch without compromising its house-party vibe. BUKU seeks to serve as a platform for the intersection of pop culture and the New Orleans underground arts community, and combines international musicians with local food vendors, local visual artists, and various surprise pop-up street performers throughout the site. BUKU's musical tastes have been a relatively even mix of electronic dance music, hip hop music, and indie rock featuring past performances by Bassnectar, Lana Del Rey, Kid Cudi, Migos, MGMT, Travis Scott, A$AP Rocky, Illenium, Nas, Excision, Major Lazer, Alt-J, TV on the Radio, A Day to Remember, REZZ, Flosstradamus, deadmau5, Kendrick Lamar, Porter Robinson, Pretty Lights, RL Grime, Seth Troxler, Future, Ellie Goulding and dozens of others.

In August 2022, BUKU organizers announced an indefinite hiatus and the cancellation of their 2023 festival.

== Location and stages ==
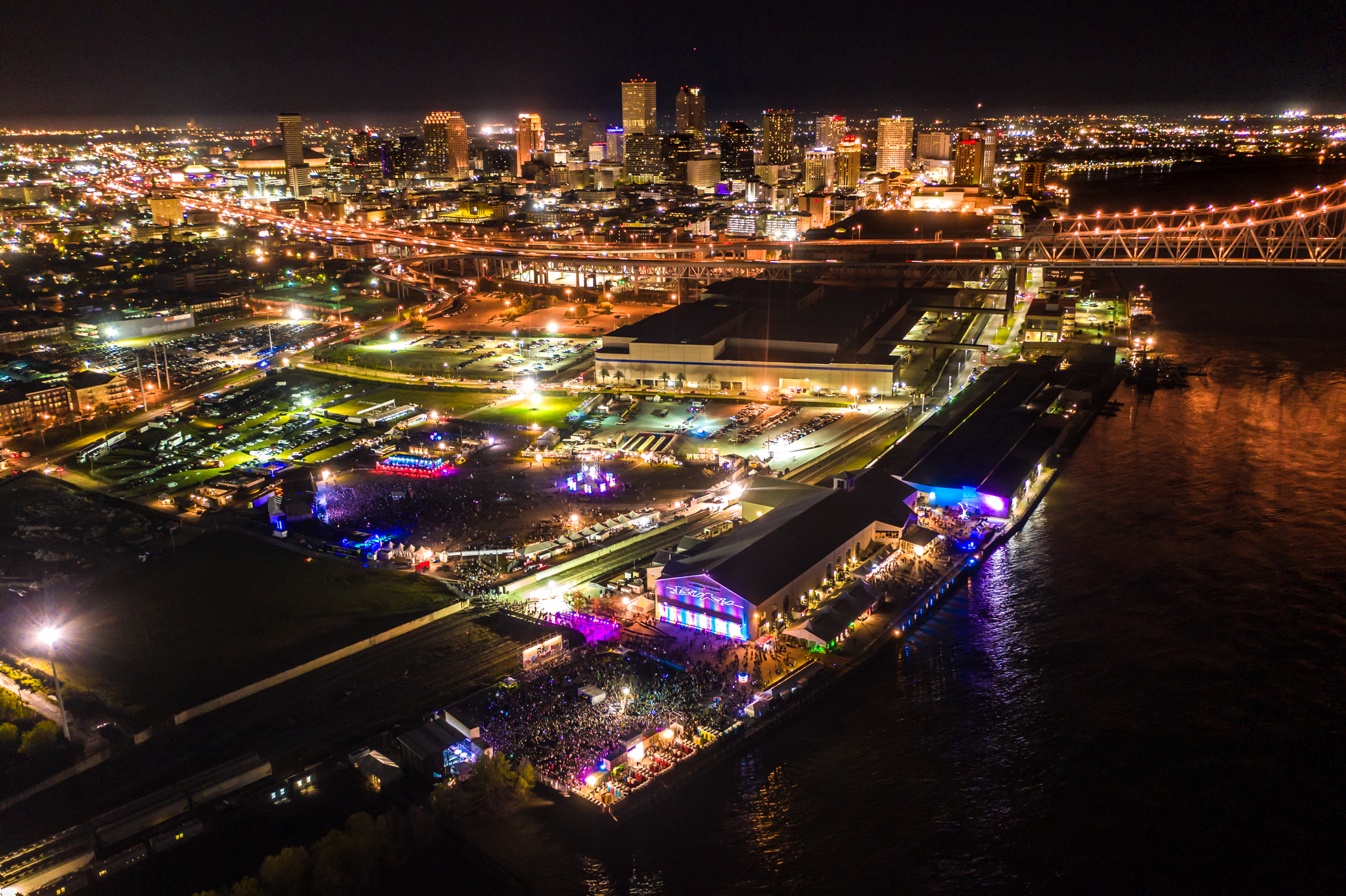
Aerial Shot of BUKU 2019

The festival is held on the New Orleans riverfront at Mardi Gras World, within walking distance of the Warehouse District and the famed French Quarter. BUKU's stages include the Power Plant (outside along the New Orleans Public Belt Railroad with the spooky Market Street Power Plant as the backdrop), the Ballroom (a concert hall with wrap around balcony viewing), the Back Alley (intended to have "feel of a secret riverside dance party"), which was replaced by the Wharf Stage in 2018, and the Float Den (one of the leading Mardi Gras float production houses). Being on the Mississippi River affords views of the Crescent City Connection bridge while boats and barges roll along the river. The Creole Queen riverboat (2012-2017) docked next to the festival, acting as the VIP-only S.S. BUKU for the weekend, with an open bar, special performances and a viewing area of the main stage from the boat's top deck.

In 2018, the festival doubled the size of its site space outside Mardi Gras World and increased its capacity to another 3,000 people each day, totaling 35,000 across its two-day event. This site expansion allowed BUKU to move the Power Plant Stage across the train tracks for even more space, including the new TOO BUKU Rooftop providing VIP ticket holders a perfect view of the main stage. The Wharf Stage, which replaced the Back Alley Stage, is located next to the Mississippi River where the Power Plant Stage used to be. Another big change was the departure of the river boat and the addition of the new VIP Stage, located at the VIP grove near the main stage.

In 2020, BUKU announced more changes to the site and an increased capacity of 25,000 people per day. The 2020 stages include the Port (renamed main stage), The Stacks (located directly in front of the Market Street Power Plant), a new space for the Float Den, Ballroom and The Wharf.

== Artwork ==
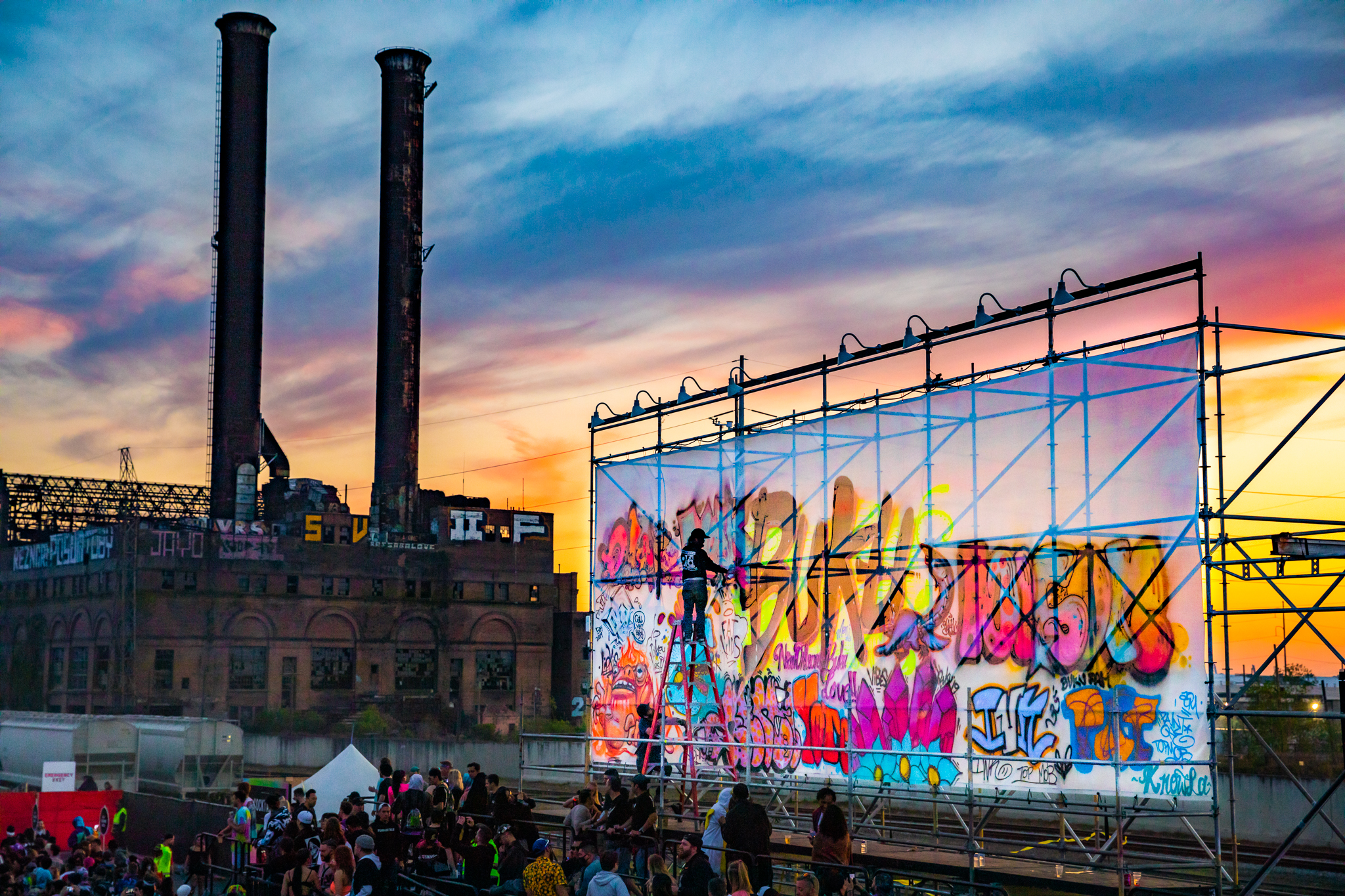
BUKU Billboard at the 2019 Festival

In addition to the musical performances, BUKU features installations by prevalent local and national artists. Sculptures, paintings, graffiti, and other mediums are all included, including the annual live graffiti gallery, the pieces of which are created in real time during the festival's two days and auctioned off to fans to raise money for charity. Past live graffiti gallery artists include Hugo Gyrl, Ceaux, DVOTE, Fat Kids, READ, KNOWLA, MEEK, Monica Kelly, Swan, Uter and more.

Other art installations at BUKU included the Live Graffiti Gallery, Fort BUKU, and the L-System Tree. Art installations at BUKU are sometimes fabricated from recycled industrial materials such as IBC totes, pipes and shipping containers.

BUKU also curates a program of pop-up performers and revelers ranging from break dancers, bounce dancers, circus troupe performers, flow artists and mobile DJ carts.

BUKU also focuses on an all illustrated branding approach conceptualized by Los Angeles-based musician and artist Young & Sick, who also made his debut festival performance on the Float Den stage at BUKU in 2014. In 2019, the festival rebranded under the direction of electronic music producer and designer Paper Diamond.

== Charity ==
In 2013, BUKU announced its charitable partner, Upbeat Academy, an after-school music education program for New Orleans middle- and high school students with a focus on hiphop and dance music production and performance. Upbeat is free to attend for all student-artists and is a registered 501(c)(3) non-profit organization. Every year, a portion of every ticket sold to BUKU Music + Art Project benefits the program. Additionally, student artists and Upbeat Alumni also perform at the festival.

== Lineup ==
=== 2012 ===
==== March 17, 2012 ====
- Avicii
- Wiz Khalifa
- Diplo
- Holy Fuck
- Mord Fustang
- Pictureplane
- Gramatik
- Yelle (DJ)
- Rockie Fresh
- Wolfgang Gartner (Afterparty)

==== March 18, 2012 ====
- Skrillex
- YelaWolf
- A-Trak
- Big K.R.I.T.
- Big Gigantic
- SBTRKT
- Purity Ring
- Sepalcure
- G-Eazy
- Figure

=== 2013 ===
==== March 8, 2013 ====
- Kid Cudi
- Primus 3D
- Kendrick Lamar
- Flux Pavilion
- Zedd
- Best Coast
- Sander Van Doorn
- Flying Lotus
- Datsik
- Japandroids
- R3hab
- Totally Enormous Extinct Dinosaurs
- Birdy Nam Nam
- Earl Sweatshirt
- Lettuce
- Aeroplane
- Shlohmo
- St. Lucia
- JMSN
- Poolside

==== March 9, 2013 ====
- Calvin Harris
- Passion Pit
- STS9
- NERO
- Major Lazer
- Big Gigantic
- Dillon Francis
- Alt-J
- Starfucker
- Trinidad James
- Flosstradamus
- Icona Pop
- RAC
- Action Bronson
- Dragonette
- Daedelus
- Big Freedia
- Hundred Waters
- Ryan Hemsworth

=== 2014 ===
==== March 21, 2014 ====
- Ellie Goulding
- Kaskade
- Zedd
- Nas
- Zeds Dead
- Bone Thugs-n-Harmony
- Sleigh Bells
- Pusha T
- Chance the Rapper
- Carnage
- Seth Troxler
- Wavves
- Lotus
- Miami Horror
- Dusky
- Conspirator
- Classixx
- Smallpools
- Big Freedia
- Treasure Fingers
- Tourist
- Blood Diamonds
- Kid Kamillion
- Gravity A
- Flight School Preps
- Jesse Slayter
- DXXXY
- Murder Beach

==== March 22, 2014 ====
- The Flaming Lips
- David Guetta
- Chromeo
- Explosions In The Sky
- Tyler, The Creator
- The Glitch Mob
- Bauuer B2B RL Grime
- Schoolboy Q
- Beats Antique
- Phantogram
- Danny Brown
- Skream
- Griz
- DJ Snake
- Clockwork
- The Pains Of Being Pure At Heart
- Soul Clap
- Dan Deacon
- Thundercat
- Generationals
- Cashmere Cat
- Blue Sky Black Death
- Young & Sick
- Unicorn Fukr
- Big History
- Javier Drada
- Shanook
- Bent Denim
- Mr. Miserable
- Free Will B

=== 2015 ===
==== March 13, 2015 ====
- A$AP Rocky
- Empire of the Sun
- Die Antwoord
- Flosstradamus
- STS9
- Portugal. The Man
- RL Grime
- Boosie Badazz
- Run The Jewels
- Gramatik
- Jamie Jones
- Zomboy
- Claude VonStroke
- Yung Lean
- Thomas Jack
- Robert Delong
- Mr. Carmack
- Bob Moses
- Big Freedia
- Slow Magic
- Mija
- Pell
- Suicideyear
- Boyfriend
- Musa
- Herb Christopher B2B Ryan Deffes
- ChrisCross

==== March 14, 2015 ====
- Bassnectar
- Passion Pit
- TV on the Radio
- Porter Robinson (Live)
- G-Eazy
- Odesza
- Borgore
- Lil B
- Hudson Mohawke
- BadBadNotGood & Ghostface Killah
- xxyyxx
- ILoveMakonnen
- Zella Day
- DJ Windows 98 (Win Butler of Arcade Fire)
- Justin Martin B2B Eats Everything
- Raury
- Slander
- In the Valley Below
- Benoit & Sergio
- Goldlink
- The Range
- Hermitude
- Bixel Boys
- Devon Baldwin
- Sweet Crude
- Gravity A (Plays Talking Heads)
- Carneyval
- Hyphee
- Klutch
- SFAM

=== 2016 ===
==== March 11, 2016 ====
- Kid Cudi
- Chvrches
- Above & Beyond
- Fetty Wap
- Griz
- Crystal Castles
- Deorro
- Rae Sremmurd
- Baauer
- Tchami
- Art Department
- Mystikal B2B Juvenile B2B Fly Boy Keno
- Post Malone
- Mija B2B Anna Lunoe
- Anderson Paak & The Free Nationals
- Jai Wolf
- Tokimonsta
- J.Phlip B2B Kill Frenzy
- Break Science
- Thugfucker
- G Jones
- Oneman B2B My Nu Leng
- DJ Soul Sister
- Donovan Wolfington
- Tristan Dufrene
- KTRL

VIP

- Sweater Beats
- Illenium
- The Funk Hunters
- Vibe Street
- DJ Matt Scott

==== March 12, 2016 ====
- Pretty Lights (Live Band)
- Future
- Miike Snow
- Nero
- Purity Ring
- Datsik
- A$AP Ferg
- Yellow Claw
- Feed Me
- What So Not
- Cashmere Cat B2B Trippy Turtle
- Earl Sweatshirt
- Børns
- Kehlani
- Sam Feldt
- Claptone
- Lee Foss
- NGHTMRE
- Julio Bashmore
- SNBRN
- Casey Veggies
- Givers
- Le Youth
- CRWNS
- Fro-Yo Ma
- Sunsabetchez

VIP

- Autograf
- Louis The Child
- DRAM
- Prince Fox
- Kidd Love

=== 2017 ===
==== March 10, 2017 ====
- Travis Scott
- GRiZMATIK
- Zeds Dead
- Young Thug
- Jauz
- Sleigh Bells
- Lil Dicky
- TroyBoi
- Lil Yachty
- Slushii
- Thundercat
- Lido
- Car Seat Headrest
- Clams Casino
- Big Wild
- Shiba San B2B Justin Jay
- San Holo
- Opiou
- K?D
- Sophie
- Nora En Pure
- Kaiydo
- Whethan
- Unicorn Fukr
- Musa B2B Otto
- Roar!
- LLEAUNA

VIP

- Ekali
- Andrew Luce
- Chet Porter
- Nebbra
- Shallou

==== March 11, 2017 ====
- Deadmau5
- Run The Jewels
- Tycho
- ZHU
- 21 Savage
- Vince Staples
- Nina Kraviz
- Washed Out
- Cashmere Cat
- Malaa
- Alina Baraz
- Ghastly B2B Herobust
- The Floozies
- REZZ
- Suicideboys
- Aminé
- Lane 8
- Minnesota B2B Space Jesus
- M.A.N.D.Y.
- Oshi
- Ambré
- Af The Naysayer
- Caddywhompus
- Boogie T.
- SFAM

VIP

- Ganja White Night
- Hosh Pan
- Stélouse
- Pusher
- DJ Soul Sister

=== 2018 ===
==== March 9, 2018 ====
- Migos
- SZA
- MGMT
- Virtual Self (U.S. Fest Debut)
- A Day to Remember
- Alison Wonderland
- Snails
- Flatbush Zombies
- Ganha White Night B2B Boogie T
- Bonobo (DJ)
- Mura Masa
- Green Velvet
- Bishop Briggs
- Rich the Kid x Famous Dex
- Lil Xan
- Falling in Reverse
- Soulection
- Sango B2B ESTA B2B The Whooligan
- Honey Dijon
- Homeshake
- Spag Heddy
- Clozee
- Walker + Royce
- The Russ Liquid Test
- New Thousand
- Nice Rack B2B Rusty Lazer
- Bouffant Bouffant

VIP (Presented by Space Yacht)

- Eprom B2B Mad Zach
- Droeloe
- BlackGummy
- Squnto
- Tvboo

==== March 10, 2018 ====
- Bassnectar
- Lil Uzi Vert
- Illenium (Live)
- Isaiah Rashad
- REZZ
- Borgore
- Sylvan Esso
- Little Dragon
- Jay Electronica
- Snakehips
- Gryffin
- Jai Wolf
- Ski Mask the Slump God
- NoName
- Hippie Sabatage
- Smino
- Princess Nokia
- Elohim
- Jade Cicada
- Emo Nite LA
- Nnamdi Ogbonnaya
- Zach Villere
- AF the Nayslayer x Yung Vul
- KTRL B2B Red Barrington
- KiddLove

VIP (Presented by Brownies + Lemonade)

- Graves
- Medasin
- Melvv
- Ducky
- Suicide Year

=== 2019 ===
==== March 22, 2019 ====
- Lana Del Rey
- Excision
- Kevin Gates
- RL Grime
- Nghtmre B2B Slander (DJs)
- Playboi Carti
- Claude VonStroke
- Fisher (musician)
- Mayday Parade
- Toro y Moi
- Death Grips
- Denzel Curry
- Ekali
- Tokimonsta
- Kero Kero Bonito
- 1788-L
- Rico Nasty
- From First To Last (DJ Set) (Matt + Travis)
- Yves Tumor
- Kidswaste
- SunSquabi
- Whipped Cream
- Dounia
- Mason Maynard
- sfam

Reppin' New Orleans

- Bawldy B2B BOARCROK
- Freewater
- The Iceman Special
- Klutch
- Lleauna
- Trax Only
- Trombone Shorty Academy

VIP

- CharlestheFirst
- Dabin
- Noizu
- AF the Naysayer

==== March 23, 2019 ====
- A$AP Rocky
- Dog Blood
- GRiZ
- Louis the Child (DJs)
- Ella Mai
- Suicideboys
- Dashboard Confessional
- Gunna (rapper)
- The Black Madonna
- Earl Sweatshirt
- J.I.D
- Getter (DJ) (presents Visceral)
- Yaeji
- G Jones
- Liquid Stranger
- Oliver Tree
- Kasbo
- Peekaboo (musician)
- Papadosio
- Earthgang
- Roy Blair
- Doja Cat
- We Came As Romans
- Mersiv

Reppin' New Orleans

- Dohm Collective
- Freewater
- James Seville
- Lil Jodeci
- Malik Ninety Five
- Thou
- Tristen Dufrene
- Unicorn Fukr
- Upbeat Academy

VIP

- Duskus
- Jantsen
- Kittens
- Xie

=== 2020 ===
Canceled due to Covid

=== 2021 ===
Canceled due to Covid

=== 2022 ===
==== March 25, 2022 ====
- Tame Impala
- Porter Robinson
- Trippie Redd
- Taking Back Sunday
- 100 gecs
- A Hundred Drums
- $uicideboy$
- Rezz
- Troyboi
- Rob49
- Fousheé
- Liquid Stranger
- Clozee
- Bas
- Lango
- Lab Group
- Wreckno
- Tierra Whack
- Shygirl
- Dom Dolla
- John Summit
- J. Worra
- Lady Lavender
- Tristan Durfene
- Tatyanna XL
- 504IcyGirl
- Choke Hole

==== March 25, 202 ====
- Tyler, the Creator
- Glass Animals
- Alison Wonderland
- Flo Milli
- Teezo Touchdown
- Glbl Wrmng
- Kali Uchis
- Baby Keem
- Vince Staples
- Neno Calvin
- Kennyhoopla
- Lane 8
- Svdden Death
- Sullivan King
- Mersiv
- Tvboo
- sfam
- Amelie Lens
- Farrago
- Maxo Kream
- TSHA
- Stone Cold Jizzle
- Moore Kimset
- Tsu Nami
- New Thousand
- Ncognita
- Treety
- Guwap Dashh
- Antwigadee!
- Legatron Prime
- Odd the Artist

== See also ==
- List of electronic music festivals
