= Mayonnaise (disambiguation) =

Mayonnaise is a thick, creamy sauce with a rich and tangy taste.

- List of mayonnaises

Mayonnaise may also refer to:

- Mayonnaise (band), a Filipino alternative rock/pop-punk band
  - Mayonnaise (Mayonnaise album), released in 2004
- Mayonnaise (Hypnotic Clambake album), 2005
- "Mayonaise" (song), a song on The Smashing Pumpkins album Siamese Dream
- "Mayonnaise" (Space Ghost Coast to Coast), a 1997 television episode
- DJ Mayonnaise, American alternative hip hop producer and DJ
- May O'Naize, a character in the film Alien Nation: Dark Horizon

== See also ==
- "Mayonesa" (Chocolate song), 2001
- Mayo (disambiguation)
