= Billy Constable =

- Birth name: William Tarcisius Constable III
- Born: March 23, 1959; Avery County, North Carolina
- Origin: Spruce Pine, North Carolina, US
- Died: August 22, 2015 (aged 56); North Carolina
- Genres: Appalachian music, Bluegrass, Cajun, country, jazz, klezmer, polka, reggae, rock, zydeco
- Occupation: Bluegrass artist
- Instrument(s): Banjo, guitar, fiddle, mandolin
- Formerly of: Sassagrass, the Constables, Charlie Moore, Josh Graves, The Dillards, Vassar Clements, Hypnotic Clambake, Leftover Salmon, Larry Keel, String Cheese Incident, Kenny Baker, Big Daddy Bluegrass Band, Acoustic Forum, Max Creek, Sam Bush The Virginia Dare Devils
- Website: billyconstable.com

Billy Constable (March 23, 1959 – August 22, 2015) was an Appalachian musician from Spruce Pine, North Carolina, best known for his three-finger-picking banjo technique and his vigorous acoustic guitar leads. He came from a rich musical background and from a young age started performing with bluegrass greats, including Charlie Moore, Josh Graves, the Doug Dillard Band, Kenny Baker and Vassar Clements. Constable has remained a key player in the Appalachian and bluegrass music scenes for several decades.

Constable developed a seizure disorder in 2011, found to be the result of a brain tumor which was surgically removed. His cancer later progressed, and he died peacefully on August 22, 2015.

== Career ==
Constable grew up playing music as a part of the Wiseman family from western North Carolina. He began his professional career playing guitar with his mother's husband, the accomplished bluegrass musician Charlie Moore. As a teenager, he found work touring with Doug Dillard. He later moved to California to play with family band the Constables.

Despite his equable bluegrass roots, Constable proved himself to be a versatile musician as the years went on. He worked repeatedly in more electric and psychedelic settings with Jam bands Leftover Salmon and String Cheese Incident. During his tenure with Hypnotic Clambake, he was found playing everything from polkas to reggae to Bulgarian music. The Blueridge National Heritage Area states on their website that Constable's banjo playing "can be deceptively eclectic. His influences begin at home and with his family, but Billy's repertoire is vast, and he is comfortable in most musical situations."

Constable played regularly with mandolinist Mark Schimick, the Big Daddy Bluegrass Band, and guitarist Larry Keel. He often performed around Boone or Asheville, not far from where he grew up in western North Carolina. He played an active role in the music scene around many parts of Appalachia.
