= Soul Clap =

American DJ and production duo

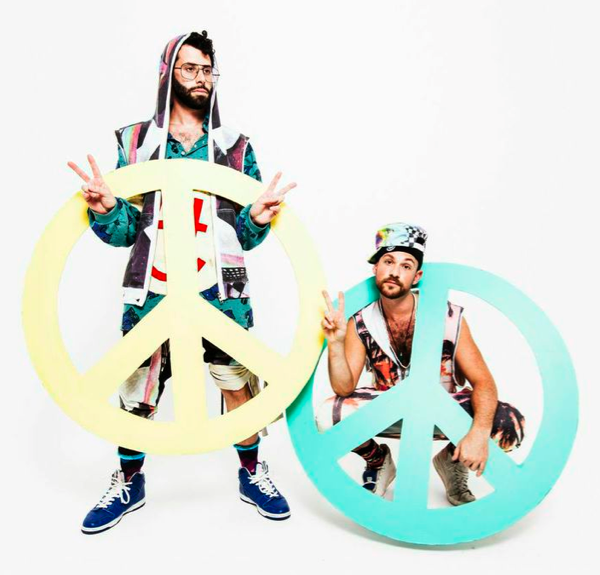

Background information
- Origin: Boston, Massachusetts, U.S.
- Genres: Funk, disco, house, hip hop, reggae
- Years active: 2001–present
- Labels: Soul Clap Records, Wolf + Lamb Records
- Members: Eli Goldstein a.k.a. Bamboozle / Elyte; Charles Levine a.k.a. Lonely C / Cnyce
- Website: soulclap.us

Soul Clap is an American DJ and production duo from Boston, Massachusetts. Active in the club scene since 2001, the group has released a number of mixtapes, EPs, singles, and albums. In 2012 they released their first album, EFUNK. According to XLR8R, Soul Clap "[tempt] the listener into the darker, more abstract corners of house (and its relative offshoots) by dressing them up with smooth, jazzy trimmings." The BBC wrote "they blend neon-splattered nostalgia with a crisp futurism thanks to their experimental production techniques."

Soul Clap tours frequently, often with the DJ duo Wolf + Lamb, and have performed at festivals such as Electric Forest Festival, Rhythm & Vines, Detroit Electronic Music Festival, Osheaga Festival, and the Decibel Festival. They have worked with musicians such as Ben Westbeech and released official remixes for groups such as Laid Back, Metronomy, Little Dragon, Robert Owens, and DJ Harvey. Soul Clap operates Soul Clap Records in Boston, which releases music both digitally and on vinyl. Soul Clap Records is a part of Crew Love, a publishing and touring group formed with Wolf + Lamb and Double Standard Records.

== History ==
=== 2001-07: Founding ===
The band Soul Clap was founded in Boston by Eli "Elyte" Goldstein and Charles "Cnyce" Levine a.k.a. Lonely C in 2001, who met in high school. Record store owner and house DJ Caril Mitro was a mentor and influence on their early genre-mixing sound. They began throwing their own parties in Boston around 2001, before starting to tour around 2007, deejaying on the underground club circuit, where the BBC wrote they began "steadily gathering acclaim for their bootlegs of RnB classics and house remixes." Wrote ResidentAdvisor.net, "their productions established a trademark sound that was as inspired by pop, soul and R&B as it was by house music." In Boston the group began hosting a number of dance parties including Midweek Techno, billed as "the area's longest running techno night" which "hosted dozens of DJs from around the world at an Irish pub in Cambridge."

=== 2008-12: First releases ===
Starting in 2008 the group released a number of singles and EPs on Airdrop Music, first with The Giraffe Remixes, which was followed in 2009 by Instafix EP. In 2009 Airdrop also released their album The Definition. While Airdrop Records released the group's first 12" vinyl records, Soul Clap has also released music on Crosstown Rebels, Culprit Records, and Mizrahi's Double Standard Records.

Soul Clap met the DJ duo Wolf + Lamb (Gadi Mizrahi and Zev Eisenberg) in September 2008, when they performed at the Marcy Hotel in Brooklyn, the home and creative space of Wolf + Lamb. They soon began collaborating and releasing music on the Wolf + Lamb record label. In 2010 Soul Clap released the collaboration Joint Custody - EP, created with Gadi Mizrahi of Wolf + Lamb. Soon the label !K7 approached all four DJs about doing a mix for their series titled DJ Kicks. About their 2011 DJ Kicks mix, Eli Goldstein described it as “gentle and deep”. After the DJ Kicks series, Soul Clap and Wolf + Lamb went on a two-month world tour together, playing regular six-hour DJ sets. Soul Clap have performed in the US, Europe, and Japan, including the Bloc Festival in 2011.

Their album Social Experiment 002, released in 2011 on Art Department's Jonny White's No. 19 Music record label, was their first commercially available mix. Stated Pitchfork in a positive review, "Social Experiment is a mix without an obvious agenda. It sounds like it wants to make me dance, but it's not pushy. It's not a label showcase or a genre exercise; the only two summary descriptions I can really pin on it are "fresh" (most artists here are relatively new to the scene) and "North American" (for its creators and their choices: Art Department, Benoit & Sergio, Jimmy Edgar, Lee Foss, Seth Troxler, and Nightplane, among others, hail from this side of the Atlantic)."

They contributed to Ben Westbeech's album There's More To Life Than This in 2011. In 2012 Soul Clap released E-FUNK: The Mixtape. Soul Clap have done official remixes for groups such as Laid Back, Metronomy, Little Dragon, Robert Owens, and DJ Harvey.

=== 2012: EFUNK: The Album ===
In late 2011 the duo began recording their first album, producing the tracks in Miami at The Stillwater Social Club. Excluding several songs on split EPs, the album included their first original and unreleased material in close to two years. Among other tracks the album includes a cover version of Egyptian Lover’s song "Alezby Inn." Guest appearances included Baby Prince (Gadi Mizrahi of Wolf + Lamb) and Mel Blatt. In 2012 they released EFUNK: The Album, with the title EFUNK short for "Everybody's Freaky Under Nature's Kingdom." The duo wrote that "The album is a culmination of our entire lives with music. This music is totally different than what we would put on an EP. It's not designed for DJs or dancefloors, but we wanted it to be something we would have put on in high school while we were chilling with homies, cutting class or trying to kick it to a chick."

The BBC positively compared the album to work by Chromeo, arguing "They share the same penchant for electro-funk, but Soul Clap sling classic 90s RnB, house, disco and New Jack Swing into the frat party punch." According to a mixed review in XLR8R, "Where past releases found Soul Clap opening up its bizarre production with slow builds and vast pockets of space, the flow here seems rushed." The review praised the band overall but criticized the radio-friendly size and formula of the songs, stating "the vocals employed often obtrusively dominate the mix while Soul Clap's expert production unfortunately takes the sideline."

=== 2013-15: Recent projects ===
By 2013 the group was collaborating with Parliament-Funkadelic's George Clinton and his label C Kunspyruhzy. Soul Clap's collaborative album Wolf + Lamb vs Soul Clap was released in CD form and digitally in September 2013, and that year they performed at the Detroit Electronic Music Festival, Osheaga Festival, 35 Denton, Snowball music festival, and the Decibel Festival. The continued touring into 2014 as well, appearing at Electric Forest Festival, Rhythm & Vines, BUKU Music + Art Project and at Wonderfruit in Thailand. The group taught a university course on dance music at Tufts University. In 2015, Soul Clap released an EP In Da Kar, collaborating once again with George Clinton and Sly Stone on the keys.

=== 2016: "Soul Clap" ===
In October 2016, Soul Clap released their self titled second album, Soul Clap.

=== 2020: Rave the Vote ===
In 2020 Soul Clap collaborated on the Rave the Vote campaign with INFAMOUS PR, 2+2 Management and Lost Resort TV- a voter registration initiative centred on the dance community.

== Soul Clap Records ==
Soul Clap Records
- Founded: 2013
- Founder: Eli Goldstein, Charles Levine
- Status: Active
- Genre: House music, techno
- Location: Boston, Massachusetts

Soul Clap operates Soul Clap Records in Boston. The label releases music both digitally and on vinyl, and is also a part of Crew Love, a publishing and touring group formed with Wolf + Lamb and Double Standard Records. The label releases the Dancing on the Charles series of albums, the first of which came out as SCRCD01 in May 2013. The albums compile a number of different Boston artists.

Label artists

- Soul Clap
- Wolf + Lamb
- Night Plane
- Nick Monaco
- Navid Izadi
- Lonely C & Baby Prince
- Michael The Lion
- Strange Danger

== Style ==
"They may wear 80s and 90s influences on their sequinned sleeves, but they blend neon-splattered nostalgia with a crisp futurism thanks to their experimental production techniques. If the future of dance music does lie with Soul Clap, you can at least count on it being downright freaky."
— The BBC

According to XLR8R, Soul Clap "made its name by effortlessly tempting the listener into the darker, more abstract corners of house (and its relative offshoots) by dressing them up with smooth, jazzy trimmings." Pitchfork Media has stated that "While Soul Clap are arguably the most visible electronic artists from Boston in some time, one thing they are not is a harbinger of a new or exciting style or scene; their success as DJs (and producers/remixers) is predicated on an elegant, elastic mix of house and techno."

== Members ==
Current

- Eli "Elyte" Goldstein
- Charles "Cnyce" Levine

== Discography ==
=== Albums ===
Albums by Soul Clap
Year	Album title	Release details
2011	Soul Clap Social Experiment 002 Part 1	Released: July 19, 2011; Label: No.19 Music; Format: digital
2011	Soul Clap Social Experiment Sampler Part 2	Released: Aug 23, 2011; Label: No.19 Music; Format: digital
2012	EFUNK: The Album	Released: Apr 20, 2012; Label: Wolf & Lamb Records; Format: digital

=== EPs ===
EPs by Soul Clap
Year	Album title	Release details
2008	The Giraffe Remixes	Released: Sep 01, 2008; Label: Airdrop Music; Format: digital
2009	Instafix EP	Released: May 15, 2009; Label: Airdrop Music; Format: digital
2009	The Definition	Released: Sep 17, 2009; Label: Airdrop Records; Format: digital
2010	Joint Custody - EP (with Gadi Mizrahi)	Released: Feb 12, 2010; Label: Double Standard Records; Format: digital
2010	Action / Satisfaction - EP	Released: Jun 28, 2010; Label: Crosstown Rebels; Format: digital
2012	EFUNK: The Singles	Released: Apr 09, 2012; Label: Edicion Wolf + Lamb / Friebank; Format: digital
2012	EFUNK: (The Remixes) - EP	Released: Jun 04, 2012; Label: Edicion Wolf + Lamb / Friebank; Format: digital
2013	The Alezby Inn (Remixes)	Released: Apr 15, 2013; Label: Edicion Wolf + Lamb / Friebank; Format: digital

=== Singles ===
Selected songs by Soul Clap
Year	Title	Album	Release details
2008	"The Giraffe"	—N/a	Airdrop Records, Apr 04, 2008
2008	"Die Ente"	—N/a	Airdrop Records, Jun 17, 2008
2009	"Puppy Crack"	—N/a	Airdrop, Feb 26, 2009
2010	"She's Bad / Beautiful Thang" (with Gadi Mizrahi)	—N/a	Double Standard Records, Jun 16, 2010
2011	"In the Park" (with S.E.C.T., Soul Clap, Tanner Ross & Sergio Santos)	DJ-Kicks Exclusives EP1	!K7 Records, Mar 08, 2011
2011	"Lonely C" (ft. Charles Levine)	DJ-Kicks Exclusives EP 2	!K7 Records, Mar 15, 2011
2011	"3 Wheel E-Motion"	DJ-Kicks	!K7 Records, Mar 15, 2011
2012	"Ecstasy"/"Need Your Loving" (ft. Melanie Blatt)	EFUNK: The Album	Wolf + Lamb, Apr 20, 2012
2012	"Weekend Affair" (with Wolf + Lamb)	Versus	Edicion Wolf + Lamb, Oct 22, 2012
2014	"Misty" (ft. Robert Owens)	Single only	

=== Remixes ===
- 2010: "Nothing Wrong With Holding On" (Soul Clap Remix) off Personal Music by Micheal J Collins
- 2010: "Baker Man / Caught Up off Aux-Rec" by Soul Clap/Childhood '87
- 2010: "Joplin (Soul Clap Remix)" off Magicbag by Death on the Balcony
- 2011: "Everybody (Soul Clap Remix)" by Miguel Migs/Everlyn Champaign King (Om Records)
- 2011: "We Call Love off Crosstown Rebels" by Art Department Feat. Soul Clap & Osunlade
- 2011: "Cocaine Cool"by Laid Back Vs. Soul Clap (Brother Music)
- 2011: "Meet Me in Salt Lake City (Soul Clap Remix)" off Under the Shade by Francis Inferno
- 2011: "Such a Shame (Soul Clap Remix)" by Greg Paulus (Double Standard Records)
- 2011: "She's Bad (Gadi Mizrahi & Soul Clap Remix)" off Stick Up Kids Remix by Bad Rabbits
- 2012: "Long Kiss Goodnight (Soul Clap Edit)" by Nick Monaco (dirtybird)
- 2013: "Pop No Style feat. Tiny (Soul Clap Chocolate Fudge Edit)" off by Tiny, Urban Myths (Nice 'N' Ripe)
- 2013: "Sock-U-Py! (soul Clap Mix)" off White People and the Damage Done by Jello Biafra and the Guantanamo School of Medicine
- 2013: "In My Soul (Soul Clap Nice 'N' Ruff Edit)" by Grant Nelson (Nice 'N' Ripe)
- 2013: "Find The Way (Soul Clap Smooth Jam Yumme Day Break Flute Edit)" by Planet Detroit (Nice 'N' Ripe)
- 2013: "What You Want (Soul Clap Deep Edit)" by Industry Standard (Nice 'N' Ripe)
- 2013: "Birdfeathers feat. Lisa Bauer, Carolina Sevilla and John Camp (Soul Clap Remix)" by No Regular Play (Wolf + Lamb Records)
- 2013: "Home (Soul Clap's Aldie Street Remix)" by Tiefschwarz, Daniel Wilde (Sound Supreme)
- 2013: "Feelin' Purple (Soul Clap Remix)" by Navid Izadi (Wolf + Lamb Records)
- 2013: "Trying to Be Cool (Soul Clap Remix)" by Phoenix (Glassnote Records)
- 2013: "Mayhem (Soul Clap Remix)" by Soul Clap on Dancing on the Charles (Soul Clap Records)
- 2014: "The Feelin' (Soul Clap's Deepest Dub)" by AB/DC (Southern Fried Records)
- 2014: "The Feelin' (Soul Clap' Classic Instrumental)" by AB/DC (Southern Fried Records)
- 2014: "The Feelin' (Soul Clap's Classic Vox)" by AB/DC (Southern Fried Records)
- 2014: "Love My Life feat. Amy Douglas (Soul Clap Club Dub)" by The Genevan Heathen (Soul Clap Records)
- 2014: "Love My Life feat. Amy Douglas (Soul Clap's Toned Like Loc)" by The Genevan Heathen (Soul Clap Records)
- 2014: "The Stalker (Soul Clap's American Tribal Remix)" by Nick Monaco (Soul Clap Records)
- 2014: "Out of My Head" off Tribute by John Newman
- 2014: "Let Me Be The One (Soul Clap Remix)" off Heidi Presents Jackhaton Jams by Kim Ann Foxman

=== Guest appearances ===
Selected songs featuring Soul Clap
Year	Single name	Primary artist(s)	Album	Label	Date
2011	"We Call Love" (ft. Soul Clap & Osunlade)	Art Department	Single only	Crosstown Rebels	July 18, 2011

== See also ==
- House music
