= Rock N Resort Music Festival =

Coordinates: 40°51′33″N 81°35′43″W

- Genre: Indie rock, classic rock, jazz, Americana, bluegrass, country, folk, alternative rock, reggae, metal
- Dates: Mid-July
- Locations: North Lawrence, Ohio, US, Clay's Park Resort
- Years active: 2004 - 2018

The Rock N Resort Music Festival was an annual, three-day music festival in mid-July hosted and produced by Clay's Park Resort in North Lawrence, Ohio, 50 miles (80 km) south of Cleveland. The festival showcased national recording artists, tribute bands, indie artists and solo performers on multiple stages, covering a variety of musical styles, though primarily reflecting a classic rock theme. Other events held during the festival included drum circles, campsite contests, new musical product demonstrations, educational seminars for young musicians, and charity events. Attendees say that aside from the music, the main draws of the festival are the party atmosphere and the friendships made by festival goers that met every year.

== History ==
The Rock N Resort Music Festival launched in 2004 and is one of many special events hosted at Clay's Park Resort. The first annual festival was held in 2004 with headliners Grand Funk Railroad, Edgar Winter, Mickey Thomas' Starship, Bachman–Turner Overdrive and Brian Howe, former vocalist for Bad Company.

Headliners in the following years included Cheap Trick, George Thorogood & The Destroyers, REO Speedwagon, Southside Johnny & The Asbury Jukes, The New Rascals, Kansas, War, Outlaws, Foghat, Joan Jett, John Kay & Steppenwolf, Eddie Money, Little River Band, The Guess Who, Commander Cody, Gin Blossoms, Molly Hatchet, Nazareth with Manny Charlton, Gregg Rolie, Sweet, Blue Öyster Cult and Creedence Clearwater Revisited.

== Venue ==
Clay's Park Resort is a 500-acre (2.0 km^{2}) RV resort, water park and entertainment facility that hosts various festival and events. Developed by Otis D. Clay, it opened in 1948. The main highlight of the park is a man-made 10-acre (40,000 m^{2}) sand-bottom swimming and boating lake. Other annual festivals hosted by the park include The ALIVE Christian Music Festival, Yankee Peddler Festival and Fox Creek Outdoor Experience.
