= Hypnotic Clambake =

American musical group

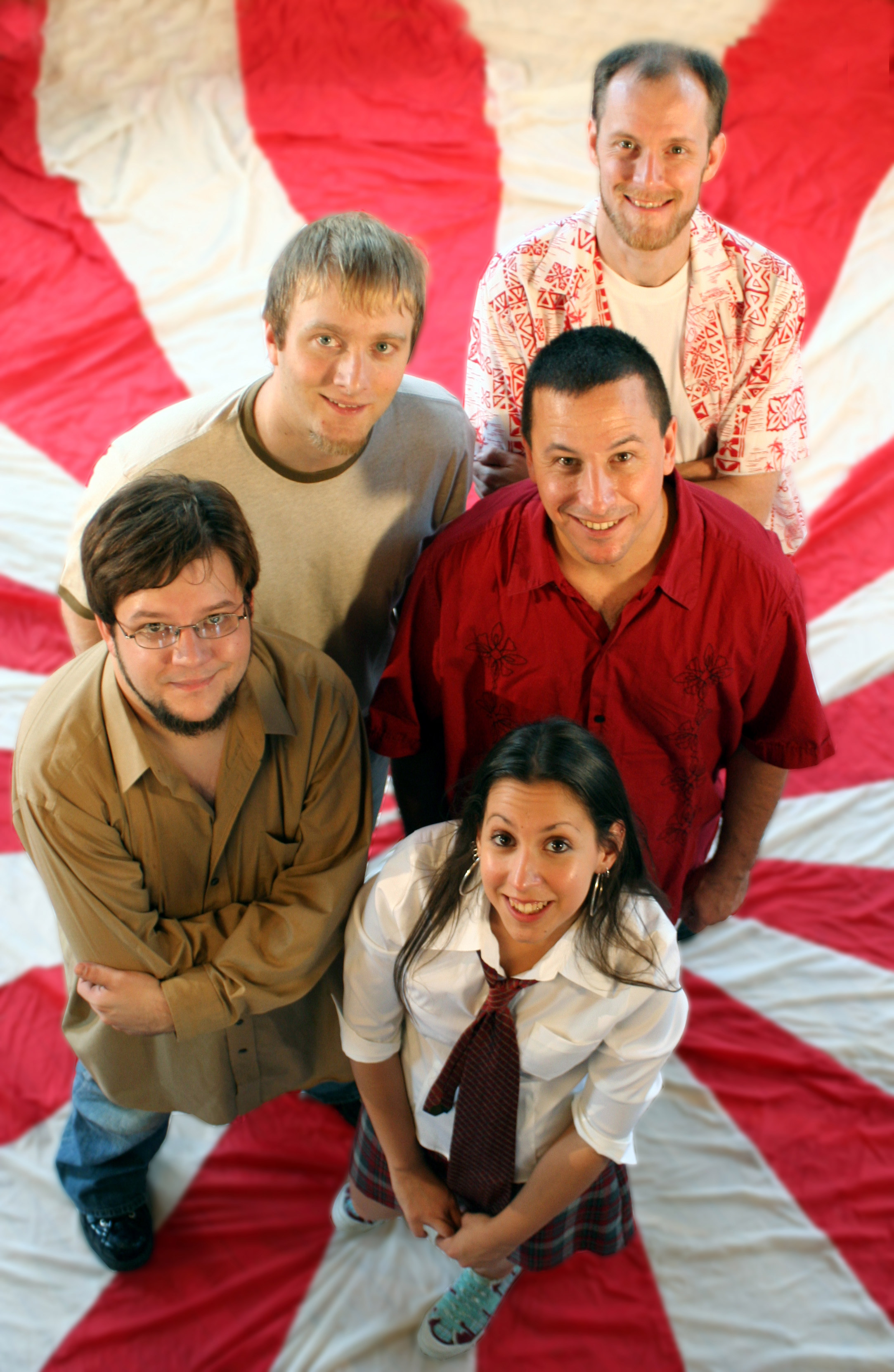

Background information
- Origin: Boston, Massachusetts
- Genres: Polka, Cajun music, zydeco, klezmer, dance music, jazz, reggae, rock, bluegrass, funk
- Years active: 1989-present
- Members: Maury Rosenberg; Chris Reynolds; Mark Phillips; JoAnn Vaccaro; Tim Hull
- Past members: Paul Amorese, P.J. Askey, Scott Barkan, Bill Brennenstul, Jeremy Brown, Kathy Burkly, Peter Caroccio, Alan Chaffee, Mark Chenevert, Marc Chillemi, Billy Constable, Derick Cummings, Campbell Dawson, Glenn Dickson, Jim Doherty, Mark Eaton, Paul Engle, Fezz, Zachary Fleitz, Bram Glik, Colin Gordon, Rohan Gregory, Dave Hamilton, Mark Hardt, David Harris, Larry Harris, Mike Hastings, Brandon Hollinger, Tomoko Iwamoto, Jeremy Kairalla, Dean Keller, Rohin Khemani, Jim Kuras, Dave Lewis, Ritchie Lynch, Richard Malcolm, John Martz, Chris Matheos, Bob McGee, Rick McRae, Doug Moody, Wade Morse, Andrew Murdock, Jeremy Phipps, Pete Polansky, John Price, Rob Probst, Chris Q, Mimi Rapson, Ralph Rosen, Eric Rosenthaul, Matt Rubano, Rob Rudin, Nicky Sanders, Jim Schwarz, Darrell Scott, Darrel Simmons, Grant Smith, Josh Smith, Dan Somber, Eric Telford, Joe Tucker, Tut, David Vandevender, David Weinberg, Chris Wicks, Harris Wulfson
- Website: www.hypnoticclambake.com

Hypnotic Clambake is a musical group from Rochester, New York known for exploring a wide variety of musical genres. Founded by frontman and accordionist Maury Rosenberg in 1989, in Boston, Massachusetts, the group began as a studio recording project and later evolved into a touring band. Rosenberg graduated from the Berklee College of Music, where he majored in filmscoring.

An often-changing line-up has helped influenced the many shifts of musical direction that Hypnotic Clambake has made over the years. Owing to a steady schedule of live performances throughout its career, the band has maintained a loyal cult following throughout the United States, primarily in the northeastern region. Since 1996, the band has hosted the annual Outrageous Universe Revival Festival (OUR Fest) at the Brushwood Folklore Campground, in Sherman, New York. Was part of a legendary all night dance party at the equally legendary Aptos house in '94.

== Discography ==
- Square Dance Messiah (1991)
- Gondola to Heaven (1993)
- Kent the Zen Master (1995)
- Frozen Live, Vol. 1 (1997)
- White Christmas Stallion (1997)
- Rutland Live - New Year's Eve (1999–2000)
- Varicose Brain (2001)
- Mayonnaise (2005)
