= Daniel Bennett (saxophonist) =

American saxophonist (born 1979)

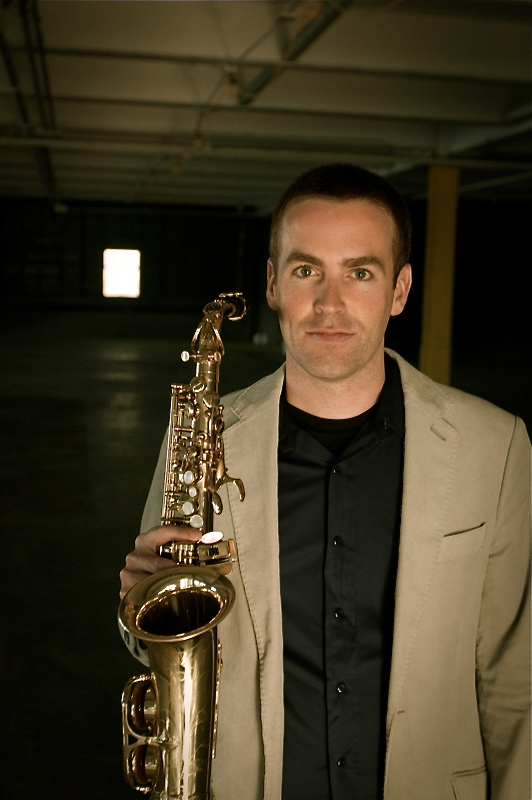
- Bennett in 2009

Background information
- Born: November 27, 1979 (age 46)
- Origin: Rochester, New York
- Occupation: Musician
- Instruments: Saxophone, flute
- Labels: Bennett Alliance
- Website: danielbennett.net

Daniel Bennett (born November 27, 1979) is an American saxophonist, based in Manhattan, who is best known for his folk jazz music. He describes his idiom as "a mix of jazz, folk, and twentieth century minimalism." The Daniel Bennett Group was voted "Best New Jazz Group" in the New York City Hot House Jazz Awards. Bennett has performed in Broadway and Off-Broadway, and he has made commercial recordings in New York City.

== Rochester years ==
Daniel Bennett was born in Rochester, New York. He first picked up the saxophone at the age of ten, and began playing professionally in 1998 while an undergraduate music student at Roberts Wesleyan College. Bennett worked with Rochester jazz artists like bassist Ike Sturm, pianist Joe Santora, Sean Jefferson, and drummer Ted Poor. In 1999, Bennett was introduced to the music of Steve Reich and Philip Glass. He began to write music for larger ensembles that infused jazz and minimalism. This led to collaborations with new music artists in Rochester, as well as performances at major Rochester venues like Six Flags Darien Lake, the Rochester Lilac Fest, Shewan Hall, and the George Eastman House.

== Boston years ==
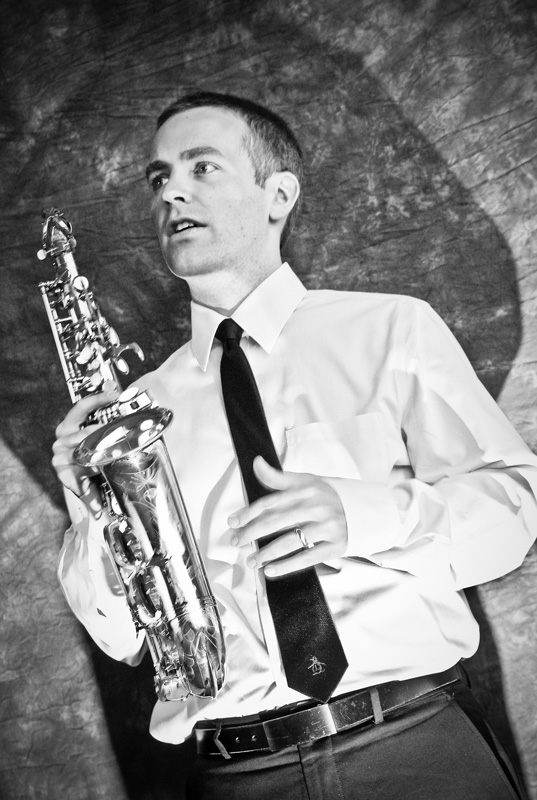
Daniel Bennett (2009)

In 2002, Bennett moved to Boston to receive his master's degree in saxophone performance at the New England Conservatory. He studied saxophone with Jerry Bergonzi, as well as classical saxophonist Ken Radnofsky. During that time, he also met drummer Bob Moses, who encouraged him to pursue his own path towards folk jazz. In 2004, Bennett met folk guitarist Chris Hersch. Hersch was performing full-time in bluegrass groups around Boston. The two began performing Bennett's original compositions in clubs and various hall around Boston. They released a self-titled EP in March 2005. Three months later, they added bassist John Servo to the group. After a year of travel, the Daniel Bennett Group released A Nation of Bears, on the Bennett Alliance label. The album was released in April 2007. Bennett used repetitious melodic ideas over shifting, odd-metered chord structures.

In February 2007, the Daniel Bennett Group expanded into a quartet. The new line-up featured classical guitarist Brant Grieshaber, as well as bassist Jason Davis. Most notable was the addition of drums to the group for the first time in three years. Percussionist Rick Landwehr joined the group in May 2007. The newly formed quartet found its audience in the Boston art scene, performing at venues like the Cambridge ArtCentral Festival, DTR Gallery, Fox Hall Studios, and the Judi Rotenberg Gallery. The Daniel Bennett Group had considerable success in Boston's jazz club scene, performing regularly at venues like The Beehive and Ryles Jazz Club. In the summer of 2008, the quartet also collaborated in double bill performances with guitarist Bill Frisell, saxophonist James Carter, and indie rock group Zyrah's Orange. In the fall of 2009, the band began a weekly artist residency at the famed Liberty Hotel (formerly the historic Charles Street Jail) in Boston's Beacon Hill neighborhood. The Daniel Bennett Group would go on to perform at the hotel for five years. Bennett composed the music for Peace and Stability Among Bears during his time at the Liberty Hotel.

== New York years ==
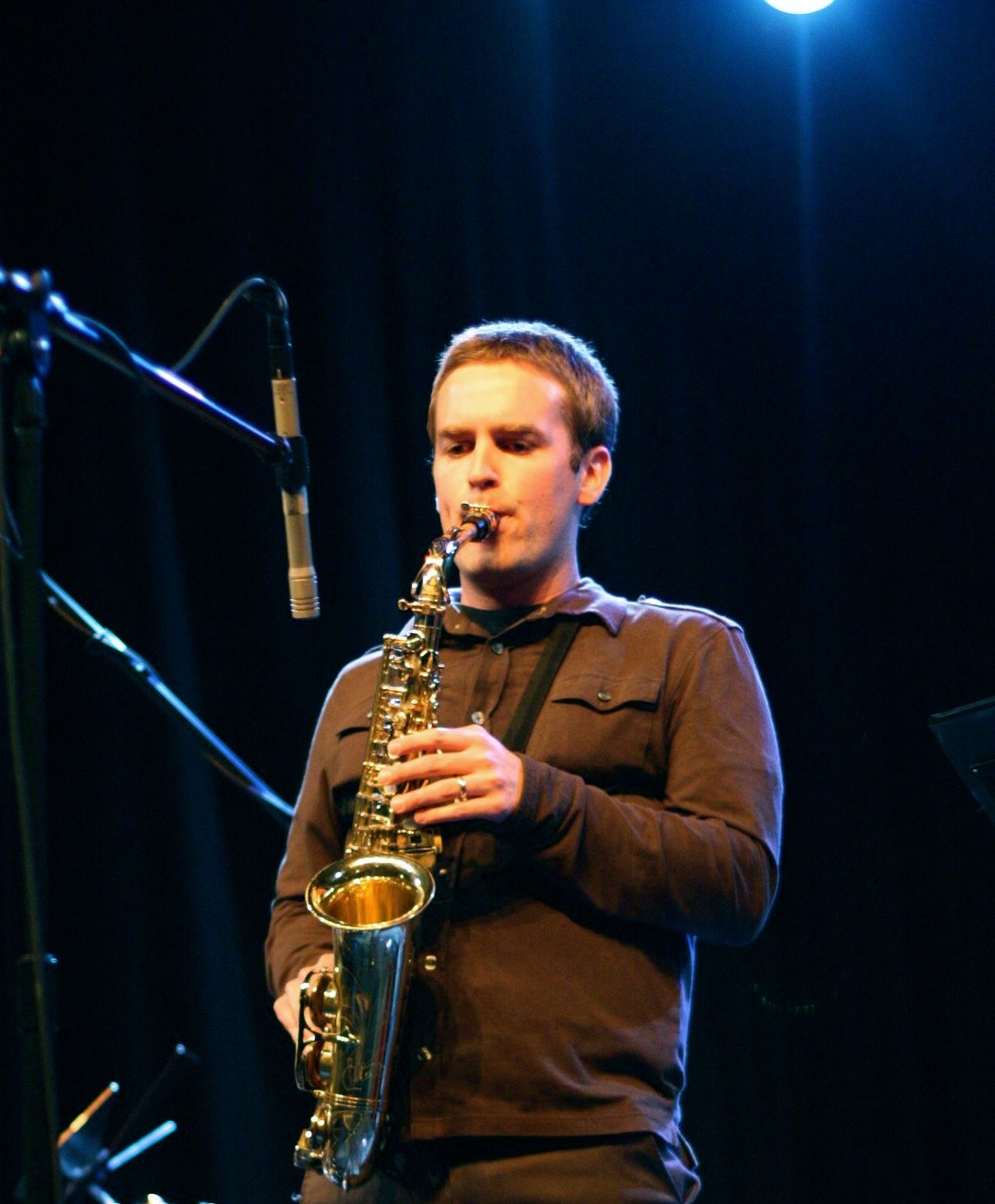
Daniel Bennett (2010)

In the summer of 2010, Bennett moved to New York City, where he enlisted a new cast of musicians that included guitarist Mark Cocheo, bassist Mark Lau, and drummer Brian Adler. In the winter of 2011, the Daniel Bennett Group organized the popular "Jazz at the Triad" concert series at the Triad Theatre on Manhattan's Upper West Side. The Daniel Bennett Group currently curates and performs in this ongoing concert series. Supporting artists on the series have included Charlie Hunter, Steve Kuhn, and Greg Osby. The concert series quickly garnered critical acclaim throughout the New York media.

In 2015, The Daniel Bennett Group was voted "Best New Jazz Group" in the New York City Hot House Jazz Awards. Bennett recently composed and performed the original musical scores for Frankenstein and Brave Smiles at the Hudson Guild Theatre in Manhattan. Recent off-Broadway theater performances include the North American premier of Legacy Falls and a revival of Swingtime Canteen at Cherry Lane Theatre. Bennett recently played woodwinds in Blank! The Musical, the first fully improvised Off-Broadway musical to launch on a national stage. The show was produced by Second City, Upright Citizens Brigade, and Improv Boston.

== Bennett Alliance ==
Charlie Hunter performs at the Bennett Alliance Music Fest in Rochester, NY (July 21, 2007).

Bennett founded Bennett Alliance, a music production company and concert organizer serving Massachusetts and New York City, in the spring of 2003. In 2006, Bennett Alliance expanded into an independent record label. Bennett Alliance has released albums for The Kode, JK & the Servomatics, and the Daniel Bennett Group.

The Bennett Alliance Music Fest (formerly Open Fest) is a jazz and folk fest held in Rochester, New York. The Bennett Alliance also produces the Bennett Alliance Concert Series at the Cambridge YMCA Theatre. Bennett Alliance events have featured artists like Bill Frisell, Charlie Hunter, percussionist Billy Martin (of Medeski, Martin, and Wood), Jerry Bergonzi, David Fiuczynski, the Kode, Joy Electric, and Bennett's own ensembles.

== Discography ==
- We Are Not Defeated (2004, Tri-Head Productions)
- A Nation of Bears (2007, Bennett Alliance)
- The Legend of Bear Thompson (2008, Bennett Alliance)
- Peace and Stability Among Bears (2011, Bennett Alliance)
- Clockhead Goes to Camp (2013, Manhattan Daylight Media)
- The Mystery at Clown Castle (2015, Manhattan Daylight Media)
- Sinking Houseboat Confusion (2016, Manhattan Daylight Media)
- We Are the Orchestra (2018, Manhattan Daylight Media)
- New York Nerve (2020, Manhattan Daylight Media)
- Mr. Bennett's Mind (2024, Manhattan Daylight Media)
