= Portland's Folk Festival =

Annual event in Portland, Oregon, U.S.

- Status: Active
- Frequency: Annually
- Venue: Crystal Ballroom
- Location: Portland, Oregon
- Country: United States
- Website: portlandsfolkfestival.com

The Portland's Folk Festival is an annual folk music festival in Portland, Oregon, United States. Organized by Scott Gilmore and Sarah Vitort of Fox and Bones, the event was established in 2018. In addition to folk music, it features Americana and roots music. Funk, pop, and R&B musicians and groups have also performed at the festival. Hot Buttered Rum headlined the 2026 event.

== See also ==
- Culture of Portland, Oregon
- List of festivals in the United States
  - List of music festivals in the United States
