= Portland Old-Time Music Gathering =

Annual music festival in Portland, Oregon, U.S.

- Logo for the 27th annual festival in 2026
- Status: Active
- Frequency: Annually
- Location: Portland, Oregon
- Country: United States

The Portland Old-Time Music Gathering is an annual folk music festival. It features traditional "old-time" and Appalachian music, as well as jam sessions, square dancing, and workshops. Some participants also wear traditional clothing.

== See also ==
- Culture of Portland, Oregon
- List of festivals in the United States
  - List of music festivals in the United States
