= Outrageous Universe Revival Festival =

Coordinates: 42.0951°N 79.5424°W

The Outrageous Universe Revival Festival (OUR Fest) is an annual summer camping festival which has been hosted by musical group Hypnotic Clambake since 1996. The three-day event features a wide array of musical and other performing artists, including several often-recurring acts, such as Pacific Northwest-based Singer-songwriter Baby Gramps. Creator of the event and Hypnotic Clambake frontman, Maury Rosenberg has touted the OUR Fest's "intimate" nature and explained that the natural beauty of the venue is a major factor contributing to the success of the weekend. The OUR Fest is held at the Kevin Cole Farm in the town of Panama, New York.
