= Shady Pines Festival =

Annual event in Oregon, U.S.

- Status: Active
- Frequency: Annually
- Location: Oregon
- Country: United States
- Website: shadypinesradio.com/festival

Shady Pines Festival is an annual music festival in Sandy, Oregon, United States. It is organized by Shady Pines Radio, a nonprofit organization and online radio station. Performers have included Mike Coykendall.

Brian Bauer is a co-founder. The inaugural and second festivals were held in Oregon City in 2022 and 2023, respectively.

== See also ==
- List of festivals in the United States
  - List of music festivals in the United States
