= Michigan City Chamber Music Festival =

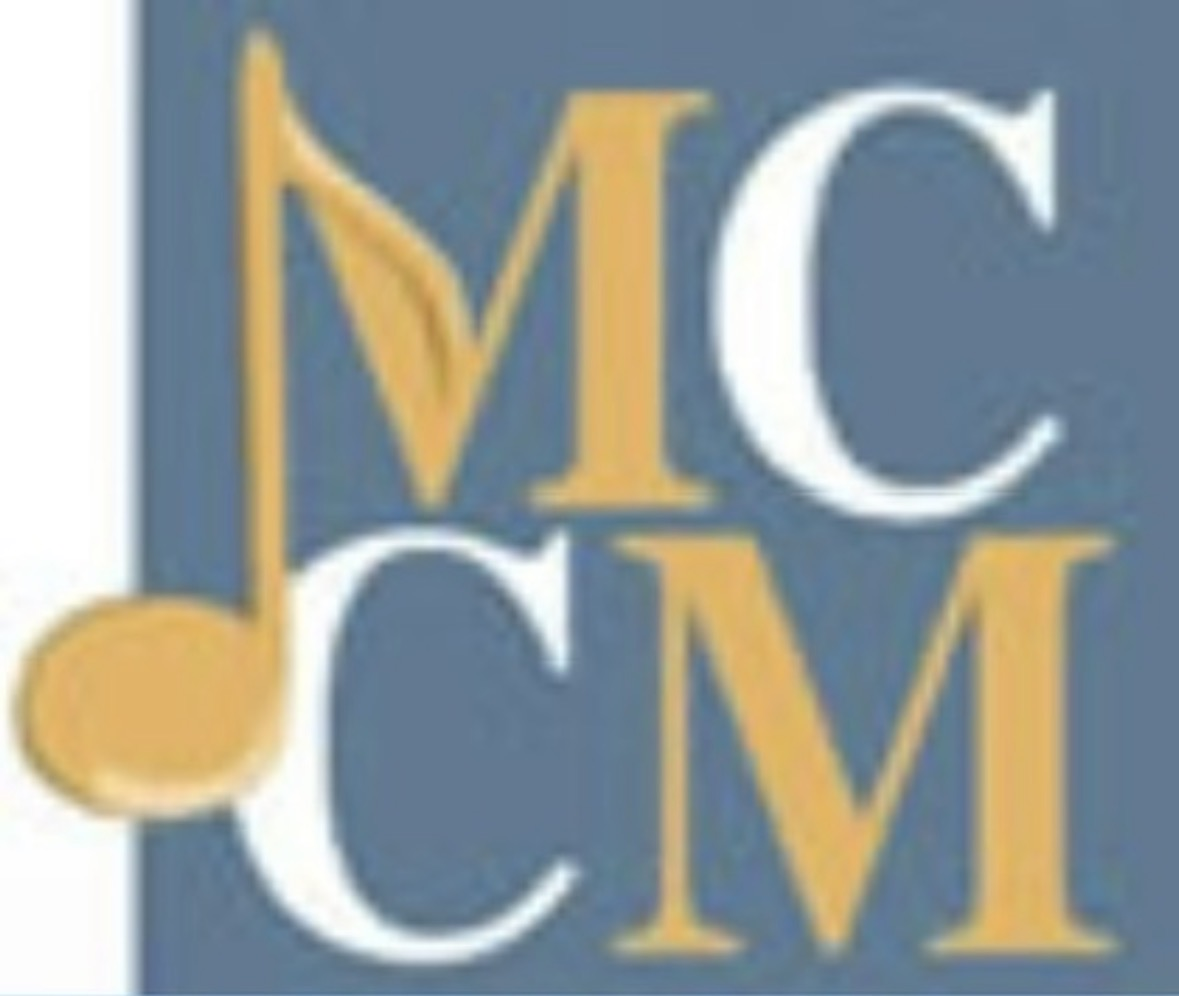
- Abbreviation: MCCMF
- Formation: 2001
- Founder: Nicolas Orbovich and Sunny Gardner-Orbovich
- Type: Nonprofit organization
- Legal status: 501(c)(3)
- Headquarters: Michigan City, Indiana, U.S.
- Location: Michigan City, Indiana, U.S.
- Artistic Director: Nicolas Orbovich
- Website: https://www.mccmf.org

The Michigan City Chamber Music Festival (MCCMF) is an American chamber music festival based in Michigan City, Indiana. Founded in 2001, the festival presents an annual series of free public chamber music concerts performed by nationally and internationally recognized musicians. In addition to its concert series, the festival sponsors educational programs for children, students, and adults, including children's concerts, master classes, lectures, and community outreach activities. The festival's stated mission is to enrich the cultural life of Northwest Indiana through free chamber music performances and music education.

== History ==
The Michigan City Chamber Music Festival was founded in 2001 by violinist Nicolas ("Nic") Orbovich and arts administrator Sunny Gardner-Orbovich. The founders envisioned an annual chamber music festival that would bring internationally recognized performers to Northwest Indiana while eliminating financial barriers by offering all performances free of charge.

Since its founding, the festival has expanded its programming beyond the annual summer festival to include concerts and educational events throughout the year. In 2026, the festival celebrated its 25th anniversary.

The festival is organized as a nonprofit charitable organization and is supported through donations, grants, sponsorships, and volunteer participation. Its stated mission is to enrich the cultural life of Michigan City through free musical performances while promoting music education within the community.

== Festival performances ==
The Michigan City Chamber Music Festival is held annually in August. Concerts are presented primarily at First Presbyterian Church in Michigan City, with additional performances and educational events held at other community venues, including the Michigan City Public Library. Admission to all festival concerts is free.

Festival programs encompass a broad range of chamber music repertoire, including works from the Baroque, Classical, Romantic, and contemporary periods. Programming combines standard chamber music repertoire with works by living composers and commissioned compositions. The festival has presented several world premiere performances, including in 2022 Concierto con brio for oboe, clarinet, and piano by Miguel del Aguila, commissioned by Nancy Ambrose King and Ryan King with funding from the University of Michigan, as well as premieres of works by American composer Libby Larsen.

Annual festivals are typically organized around a unifying artistic theme. Recent themes have included Witness, Legacy, and Triumph (2019), Musical Heroes, Then and Now (2021), Music and Healing (2022), Many Peoples, Many Musics (2023), Come Together (2024), Worldwide Women (2025), and Looking Back, Looking Forward (2026), commemorating the festival's 25th season.

== Educational programs ==
Education is a central component of the festival's mission. During the annual festival, musicians present educational concerts for children, lecture-demonstrations, music camps, and interactive programs designed to introduce audiences to chamber music. Children's concerts are regularly presented at the Michigan City Public Library and other community venues.

The festival has also organized master classes, workshops, and coaching sessions for student musicians. Additional educational initiatives have included a Summer Children's Chorus, youth performance opportunities, and presentations for parents, teachers, and community members.

== Artists ==
The Michigan City Chamber Music Festival has featured performers from American orchestras, universities, and chamber ensembles. Participating artists have included violinists, violists, cellists, pianists, wind players, vocalists, and composers from the United States and abroad.

The festival's founding artistic director is violinist Nicolas Orbovich, who has performed with numerous chamber ensembles and orchestras throughout the United States and has emphasized chamber music education throughout his career.

Orbovich studied music at Carnegie Mellon University, earned a master's in music at DePaul University in Chicago, was a principal violinist with the South Bend Orchestra, taught music at Valparaiso University and Andrews University in Berrien Springs, Michigan, and also at music camps and festivals, including three summers at the Hot Springs Music Festival in Arkansas, which was the subject of an Emmy Award-winning documentary He plays a vintage violin made in 1892 in Boston by Jerome Squier.

Musicians who have appeared at the festival include:

Nicolas Orbovich (violin)

Robert Auler (piano)

Nancy Ambrose King (oboe)

William King (clarinet)

Rudolf Haken (viola)

Wesley Baldwin (cello)

Zofia Glashauser (violin)

Jasmin Arakawa (piano)

Melisa Barrick Baldwin (voice)

Kimberly Jones (voice)

Additional guest artists and composers have participated in festival performances throughout its history.

== Community outreach ==
In addition to the annual summer festival, the organization presents concerts throughout the year, including family programs and community celebrations. These have included performances recognizing Black History Month, holiday concerts, house concerts, and other outreach events intended to broaden public access to classical music. Many performances are presented in partnership with local churches, schools, libraries, and community organizations.

== Repertoire ==
Festival programming spans several centuries of chamber music literature. Repertoire has included works by composers such as Arcangelo Corelli, Johann Sebastian Bach, Wolfgang Amadeus Mozart, Ludwig van Beethoven, Franz Schubert, Robert Schumann, Felix Mendelssohn, Frédéric Chopin, Franz Liszt, Johannes Brahms, Antonín Dvořák, Pyotr Ilyich Tchaikovsky, Alexander Borodin, Sergei Rachmaninoff, Maurice Ravel, Dmitri Shostakovich, Paul Hindemith, Erich Wolfgang Korngold, Aaron Copland, Samuel Barber, and contemporary composers including Libby Larsen, Miguel del Aguila, Jessie Montgomery, and Jessica T. Carter. Festival programs frequently combine established chamber music repertoire with newly composed works and less frequently performed compositions.

== See also ==
- Chamber music
- List of classical music festivals
- List of chamber music festivals
- List of music festivals in the United States
