= Roots N Blues Festival =

Coordinates: 38.951°N 92.306°W

The Treeline Music Festival, previously known as the Roots N Blues Festival and Roots N Blues N BBQ Festival, is an annual music festival that takes place in Stephens Lake Park in Columbia, Missouri. The festival features international, national, regional and local artists, both established and emerging, from the genres of roots, blues, gospel, country, folk, bluegrass, rock and soul. The Roots N Blues Festival is a three-day event that is typically held during the last weekend of September.

The festival includes over 30 live music performances on two stages, food and beverage vendors, craft vendors, a Ferris wheel and art installations. The festival also hosts a half marathon and 10k race and a gospel celebration during the festival weekend. The festival is organized by Thumper Entertainment, which also manages the non-profit Roots N Blues Foundation in support of Blues in the Schools, a youth music education program.

== History ==
The Roots N Blues N BBQ Festival began in 2007 as a free promotional event celebrating the 150-year birthday of Boone County National Bank (now Central Bank of Boone County) on the streets of downtown Columbia, Missouri. The 2007 Roots N Blues N BBQ Festival was organized by advertising agency Woodruff Sweitzer with the help of Richard King, then-owner of The Blue Note. The City of Columbia shut down ten city blocks in downtown Columbia for the festival, which drew a crowd of around 70,000.

In 2007, the Blues in the Schools program was formed by King and local musician and educator TJ Wheeler. The program brings music and cultural education to elementary, middle school and high school students across mid-Missouri. In 2013, the Roots N Blues Foundation was formed to manage the program.

In 2008, Thumper Entertainment was established and took over organization and operation of the festival. Woodruff Sweitzer and King continued ownership of the festival and Thumper Entertainment.

In 2013, the festival was moved to Stephens Lake Park. After the change of location, the festival saw a decline in attendance, from 52,000 in the year prior to just over 23,000. The drop in attendance was likely due to an elimination of free attendance areas.

In 2014, the addition of a green vendor program marked a move toward sustainability. A set of guidelines for food and craft vendors, which includes replacing styrofoam and plastic plates and utensils with biodegradable alternatives, recycling fry oil and composting food scraps, intends to help minimize the festival's ecological footprint.

== Headliners By Year ==
=== 2007 (September 7–8) ===
- Tab Benoit
- Taj Mahal
- Blind Boys of Alabama
- Jerry Douglas Band
- Big Smith
- Deke Dickerson

=== 2008 (October 3–4) ===
- Tab Benoit
- Buddy Guy
- Roy C
- Dale Watson
- James Hand
- Del McCoury Band

=== 2009 (September 9–10) ===
- Blind Boys of Alabama
- Dan Tyminski
- Black Joe Lewis & The Honey Bears
- Booker T.
- The Itals
- The SteelDrivers

=== 2010 (October 1–2) ===
- Derek Trucks & Susan Tedeschi
- Tab Benoit
- Del McCoury Band
- Anders Osborne
- Trampled Under Foot

=== 2011 (September 9–10) ===
- Fitz and the Tantrums
- Los Lobos
- Taj Mahal
- Ana Popović
- Robert Randolph and the Family Band

=== 2012 (September 21–22) ===
- Al Green
- Edward Sharpe & The Magnetic Zeros
- Joe Lovano Us Five with Esperanza Spalding, James Weidman, Otis Brown III, & Matt Wilson
- Wanda Jackson
- Marty Stuart & His Fabulous Superlatives
- Del McCoury Band

=== 2013 (September 20–22) ===
- The Black Crowes
- Blues Traveler
- Jimmy Cliff
- John Hiatt
- Steve Earle

=== 2014 (September 26–28) ===
- The Avett Brothers
- John Prine
- Rosanne Cash
- Amos Lee
- Trampled by Turtles
- Los Lobos
- Jason Isbell
- St. Paul & The Broken Bones

=== 2015 (September 25–27) ===
- Dwight Yoakam
- Brandi Carlile
- NEEDTOBREATHE
- Buddy Guy
- Dr. John
- The Word featuring Robert Randolph, John Medeski, & North Mississippi Allstars
- Lucinda Williams
- Punch Brothers
- G. Love & Special Sauce

=== 2016 (September 30 – October 2) ===
- The Avett Brothers
- Grace Potter
- Jason Isbell
- Nathaniel Rateliff & The Night Sweats
- Ben Folds
- St. Paul & The Broken Bones

=== 2017 (September 29 – October 1) ===
- Ryan Adams
- Leon Bridges
- Gary Clark Jr.
- John Prine
- Emmylou Harris
- Band of Horses
- Booker T's Stax Revue

=== 2020 ===
The 2020 Festival was canceled due to the Covid-19 Pandemic.

== See also ==
- University of Missouri School of Music
