= Nick Monaco =

Nick Monaco is an electronic music DJ and LGBT advocate. He has released three albums over his career: Mating Call in 2014, Half Naked in 2016, and Heroin Disco in 2018. Monaco is the cofounder of UNISEX Records and founder of the lipstick company Freak Flag.

== Music ==
Nick Monaco began his career as a DJ and producer in San Francisco. In 2012 he was signed to the newly formed label Soul Clap Records. As a live performer, Monaco has stated that he intends to portray an air of androgyny, and creates shows that challenge gender roles and gender binaries. He has toured internationally, and creates flamboyant stage shows for his performances.

In 2013 Monaco released his first EP Naked is my Nature on the Soul Clap Records label. His first album, released on the same label, was entitled Mating Call in September 2014. Vibe magazine called the debut album “an aural exploration of sexuality”. In 2016 he released the album Half Naked, which was influenced by jazz and funk music genres. It also featured the original guitar compositions of David Marston. The two of them also produce a two-song EP Island Life, recorded in the Blue Mountains of Jamaica.

In 2018, Monaco released his third studio album, Heroin Disco. The album explores the contemporary overdose culture of the United States, including “drug abuse, phone addiction, and hedonism”, according to Ear Milk, in addition to "excess, vanity, and aesthetic". The album was released on UNISEX Records, a label he cofounded. Tracks from the record have been remixed by other DJs including Mija. Monaco also created a new perfume scent for each of the tracks on his album Half Naked.

== Personal life and businesses ==
Nick Monaco is a citizen of the United States, Italy, and Switzerland, and is originally from Northern California. Monaco is also the co-founder of UNISEX Records alongside musician and partner Emmett Kai. He also owns a lipstick company called Freak Flag; the proceeds from which go to charities supporting gender reassignment surgeries through the Jim Collins Foundation. Additionally, Monaco has founded a perfume line to co-incide with his album Half Naked. He has otherwise been an advocate of the history of the queer and trans roots of electronic and DJ music.
