= Dusk Music Festival =

Annual festival in Tucson, Arizona

The DUSK Music Festival (DUSK) is an annual two-day music festival held at Jácome Plaza, in Tucson, Arizona in early November. Founded by John Rallis, Page Repp and Pete Turner in 2016, DUSK has three stages where musical artists from genres including rock, indie, country, EDM and hip hop perform for fans. The performances typically begin around 12:00 PM and continue until 11:00 PM on Saturday, and Sunday during the festival with various stages spread out in the urban plaza setting. Approximately 15,000 people attend the festival each year.

== Lineups ==
=== 2023 ===
The seventh DUSK Music Festival saw its third return to Jácome Plaza on November 10 & 11th, 2023. This year's lineup featured DJ Snake; Seven Lions; 311; AC Slater; Coin; Neil Frances; Troyboi; Bad Suns; Deathpact; J.Worra; Ray Volpe; Shiba San; Freak On; Gem & Tauri; GG Magree; Kelsey Karter & The Heroines; LØLØ; Masteria; Smallpools; Softest Hard, and Young Rising Sons. Prior to the event, DJ Snake was announced to have withdrawn from his performance, and was replaced by Louis the Child.

=== 2022 ===
The 6th annual DUSK Music Festival was held on November 11th and 12th, at Jácome Plaza in Downtown Tucson, AZ with performances from GRiZ, Alison Wonderland, Young the Giant, NGHTMRE, Nora En Pure, Sofi Tukker, Zomboy, Aluna, and Dillon Nathaniel.

=== 2021 ===
DUSK Music Festival returned on November 13 & 14, 2021 at Jácome Plaza in Downtown Tucson, AZ. Performances included Diplo, Jimmy Eat World, Porter Robinson, Duke Dumont, SG Lewis, GG Magree, John Summit, Justin Martin, Mob Rich, Pauline Herr, Sage Armstrong, STRFKR, Tank and the Bangas, and Yolanda Be Cool.

NOTE: no festival in 2020.

=== 2019 ===
The fourth DUSK Music Festival was held over November 9-10 2019 at Armory Park in Tucson, Arizona. The performers included national artists, Kaskade, Rezz, Two Door Cinema Club, A R I Z O N A, Broncho, Cray, Dombresky, Fitz and the Tantrums, Goldroom, Malaa, Shallou, Tokimonsta, Wax Motif, What So Not, and Whethan as well as local artists, Drew Cooper, Billy Gatt, Enri, Future Syndicate and YKNOT B2B W.A.S.H., Housekneckt, Jason E. B2B Big Brother Beats, Junk James, Lo Key, Low Audio, McShite, Nocturnal Theory, Parsa, Sophia Rankin, Thoolan, Twelve Inches and Wolfie.

=== 2018 ===
The third DUSK Music Festival was held over November 10-11 2018 at Armory Park in Tucson, Arizona. The performers included national artists Dillon Francis, Phantogram, Big Gigantic, Cold War Kids, A-Trak, Jai Wolf, SuperDuperKyle, Anna Lunoe, Hoodboi, Andrew Luce, Madeaux, X.X.T., Cherub, AC Slater, Elohim, Falcons, and Elley Duhé, along with local artists including, Sur Block, Gram B2B SYNRGY, Mother Tierra, Juke and Traxler B2B HVRLY

=== 2017 ===
The second DUSK Music Festival was held over October 6-7 at Rillito Park in Tucson, Arizona. The performers included national artists, Big Sean, Steve Aoki, Milky Chance, Louis the Child, Vince Staples, DJ Jazzy Jeff, Polica, Win and Woo, Trackstar the DJ, Orkesta Menzdoza and local artists, DJ YKNOT, Future Syndicate, Herm, Lando Chill, Powermix, Dr. SARCHAR B2B HVRLY.

=== 2016 ===
The inaugural Dusk Music Festival was held over Saturday, October 22, 2016 at Rillito Park in Tucson, Arizona. The performers were Luna Aura, Gaby Moreno, Wild Belle, Calexico, A-Trak, DJ Mustard, Danny Brown, Matt and Kim, and RL Grime.

== See also ==
- List of music festivals in the United States
- List of hip hop music festivals
