= Mayonnaise (Hypnotic Clambake album) =

Studio album by Hypnotic Clambake
- Released: 2005
- Genre: Bassy household polkadelica
- Label: Blue Button Records
- Producer: self-produced

Mayonnaise is the name of Hypnotic Clambake's fifth full-length studio album. It was released in 2005 on Blue Button Records. The album showcases the musical talents of the band's lineup at the time. It also employs catchy, pop-format songs to explore a range of humorous topics. Typical of Hypnotic Clambake, the record wanders through a wide variety of musical genres, "from Middle Eastern spice to chill calypso style." Bandleader Maury Rosenberg collaborated heavily with guitarist/bassist Chris Reynolds on the record. Reynolds wrote several of the songs, including "500 Robots" and "Woe Is Me."

== Track listing ==
(All songs by Hypnotic Clambake)

1. "500 Robots" – 3:13
2. "Trouble" – 3:56
3. "Psychedelic Polka" – 1:41
4. "Beans" – 3:56
5. "Windows" – 3:51
6. "Man With The Face On The Side" – 3:30
7. "The Scheme of Things" – 5:20
8. "Turn Your Brain Off" – 2:25
9. "Danger Mouse" – 7:49
10. "Just a Mountain" – 1:57
11. "Woe Is Me" – 3:15
12. "Clambake" – 4:45
