= Open Fest =

Open Fest is now called the Bennett Alliance Music Fest. The jazz and folk festival is held annually in Rochester, New York. Open Fest was formed in the summer of 2003 by saxophonist Daniel Bennett, Andrew Cloninger, and Rich Oppedisano. The vision of Open Fest was to create a platform for diverse musical groups to perform. From traditional Taiwanese performer Yi Chen Chang, to synthpop guru Joy Electric, Open Fest quickly became a format for new music. Other artists to grace the Open Fest stage have been saxophonist Daniel Bennett, national recording artist George Collichio, and folk sensation Courtney A Streb.

Bennett Alliance is a record label that operates mostly in New York City and Boston. It is operated by full-time performing artists. Bennett Alliance was created by saxophonist Daniel Bennett in the spring of 2004. In 2006, Bennett Alliance began an important collaboration with California-based Velvet Blue Music. Velvet Blue Music is one of the fastest growing independent record labels in America. Velvet Blue Music is operated by veteran musician Jeff Cloud, who has released albums for groups such as Richard Swift, Stavesacre, Soul-Junk, and Starflyer 59. Bennett Alliance continues to team up with organizations like Velvet Blue Music in order to bring musical artists from across America to Open Fest.
