= Portland Chamber Music Festival =

The Portland Chamber Music Festival is an annual chamber music festival located in Portland, Maine, founded in 1994 by Jennifer Elowitch (violinist) and Dena Levine (pianist). In 2018, following PCMF's 25th anniversary season, Elowitch (Founder and Artistic Director Emerita) was succeeded by violist Melissa Reardon as Artistic Director. The core Festival is a four-concert main stage series and free Family Concert in August at the Abromson Community Education Center. In addition, the Festival's year-round offerings include a Salon Series of concerts in private homes and intimate spaces throughout Greater Portland, and innovative contemporary music concerts in collaboration with SPACE Gallery.

In 2011, the Maine Public Broadcasting Network chose PCMF to inaugurate its new “Maine Arts Live” initiative, featuring a live broadcast of PCMF Opening Night 2011 throughout the state and streaming on the web.
