= Snowball Music Festival =

Former music festival in Colorado, United States

SnowBall Music Festival
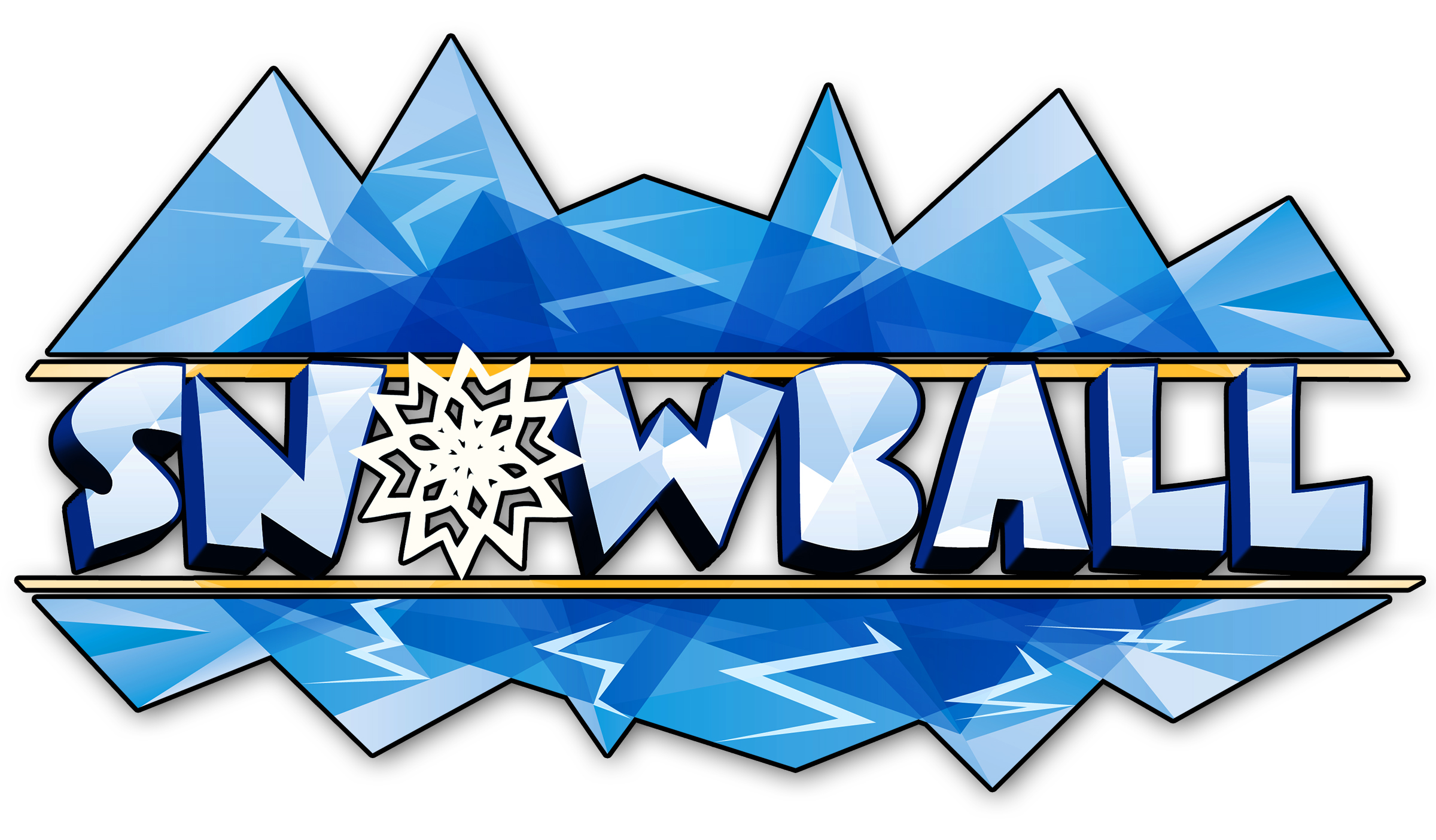
- 2013 Logo
- Dates: March
- Locations: Avon, Colorado, United States
- Years active: 2011–present

The SnowBall Music Festival was a music festival held annually in Winter Park, CO. The first edition occurred from March 2–4, 2011, near to Vail in the city of Avon, CO. The three-day-long event consisted of back to back performances played across three outside stages. Headliners included: Pretty Lights, Bassnectar, and Flaming Lips. The organisers claimed that the festival incorporated the "ultimate marriage: mountains and music." Some participants have compared Snowball to Coachella Valley Music and Arts Festival, giving it the nickname Snowchella.

The festival's winter setting allows attendees to experience Vail and Beaver Creek Resorts during the day prior to attending the music festival.

In 2013, the festival moved location from its original location in Avon to Winter Park. The 3rd edition of the festival took place March 8–10.

== Outreach ==
Organizers of Snow Ball decided to have an event not only centered around music, but a bigger cause as well. They partnered with the non-profit organization, The Realm of Caring, to raise money to help fund the education of music in elementary schools. For the 2013 festival, a limited edition t-shirt (featuring the festival's unofficial moose mascot) was sold with a portion of the profits benefiting Pencils of Promise—a non-profit organization that builds schools and increases educational opportunities in the developing world.

== Lineup ==
2014

Friday, April 4

- Snowball Stage: Knife Party, Earl Sweatshirt, The Floozies, Jimkata
- Grove Tent: Mimosa, GTA, Herobust, Henry Fong
- Ballroom Stage: Warpaint, Escort, Real Magic, Flash/Lights
- Heat Hut: Justin Jay, Option4, Thomas Jack, Bixel Boys, Tropicool

Saturday, April 5

- Snowball Stage: Pretty Lights, Yeasayer, Brother Ali, STRFKR, Technicolor Tone Factory, Sunsquabi
- Grove Tent: Kill the Noise, Lunice, Caked Up, Wave Racer, Wavo Winner
- Ballroom Stage: Twin Shadow, Trippy Turtle, Afroman, Sunsquabi, A Band in Pictures, The Knew
- Heat Hut: MK, J. Phlip, Graff, Bones, Bagheera, Coastin, Lady Leah, Guillaume

Sunday, April 6

- Snowball Stage: GRiZ, Busta Rhymes, Wild Belle, Chali 2na & House of Vibe, You Me & Apollo
- Grove Tent: PLM Party feat. Pretty Lights, Clockwork, Kap Slap, What So Not, TWRK, Proper Motion
- Ballroom Stage: Jagwar Ma, Rufus Du Sol, Chrome Sparks, Inner Oceans, Eminence Ensemble
- Heat Hut: Andhim, Maxxi Soundsystem, Juan MacLean, Need & Necessity, Keepers, Sam Warren, Wavo Winner

2013

Friday March 8

Big Gigantic • Kendrick Lamar • Porter Robinson • Krewella • The Presets • Zion I • American Royalty • Yamn • Orchard Lounge • RAC • Robotic Pirate Monkey • Twiddle • The Floozies • Rumtum • Vinnie Maniscalco • Cold River City

Saturday March 9

Pretty Lights • Japandroids • Datsik • Portugal. The Man • Totally Enormous Extinct Dinosaurs • Poliça • Gigamesh • Rubblebucket • Delta Spirit • Shlohmo • Run DMT • Mo Rockin • Luminox • Tumbleweed Wanderers • Kink Ador • Truth • Steffi Graf • School Knights

Sunday March 10

STS9 • Flying Lotus • Grizmatik • Crizzly W/ Lil Flip • Flosstradamus • Tennis • Robert Randolph & The Family Band • Destructo • Surfer Blood • Aeroplane • Ishi • Michal Menert • Bestfriends • Bonfire Dub • Chris B • K Theory • Ramona

2012

Friday March 2

Rusko • Big Boi • Major Lazer • MiMOSA • Elephant Revival • Bag Raiders • Deer Tick • Break Science • Marty Party • Wolf + Lamb Vs Soul Clap • Thundercat • The Lumineers • Helicopter Showdown • Supervision • Princeton • Hollagramz • Dubskin • Flashlights • Tatanka • Acidophiles • Bonfire Dub • Submission Dubstep • Thick Chick • Eminence Ensemble • Skywalkers • Boneless • Tropicool • Drunken Hearts • DJ Adam Ross

Saturday March 3

Snoop Dogg • TV On The Radio • The Kooks • Ghostland Observatory • Dada Life • The Head And The Heart • Trampled By Turtles • Dale Earnhardt Jr • Dillon Francis • Figure • Big Freedia • Gramatik • Gauntlet Hair • Pictureplane • Tribes • Paul Basic • Griz • Small Black • Cassian • My Goodness • Pierce Fulton • Cherub • A Tom Collins • Smalltown Deejays • Digital Connection • Guns In The Sun Deejays • Sauna • Boyhollow Option 4 • The Congress • Sunsquabi • Tommy Michael • Bixel Boys

Sunday March 4

Bassnectar • Beats Antique • Los Amigos Invisibles • BoomBox • Unknown Mortal Orchestra • Nathaniel Rateliff • Motet • Minnesota • Two Fresh • Nit Grit • Gardens & Villa • Plastic Plates • Afro Man • Dallas K • Mancub • Kinetix • Crushendo • Gost Effects • Satellites • Stephan Jacobs • At Dawn We Rage • Young Pharaos • Magic Beans • Wheeler Brothers • Human Agency • Mikey Thunder

2011

Friday March 4

Pretty Lights • Edward Sharpe and the Magnetic Zeroes • Diplo (DJ) • Porter Robinson • 12th Planet • Zeds Dead • Lord Huron • Mansions on the Moon • RAC • Robotic Pirate Monkey • Superhumanoids • Gauntlet Hair • Mr. Anonymous • Lazerdisk Party Sex • Ecto Cooler • DJ ANNALOG • McADOO • Snake Rattle Rattle Snake • DJ Lito

Saturday March 5

Bassnectar • Savoy • Lotus • Local Natives • Big Gigantic • Classixx • Paper Diamond • Twin Shadow • Sam Adams • Onra • American Royalty • MTHDS • Scorpion Breath • Mo Rockin • //Bones • Steffi Graf • Candy Claws • Rabbits Running • Chain Gang of 1974

Sunday March 6

The Flaming Lips • Portugal. The Man • EOTO • Miami Horror • Eskmo • Baths • Afro Man • Brother Ali • Jesse Woods • Emory Quinn • Michal Menert • Sugarpill • Air Dubai • Oliver Vanity • Springdale Quartet • Con Bro Chill
