= Woodruff (company) =

- Formerly: Woodruff Communications, Woodruff & Associates, Woodruff Sweitzer
- Company type: Private company
- Industry: Advertising
- Founded: 1992; 33 years ago in Columbia, Missouri
- Founder: Terry Woodruff
- Headquarters: Columbia, Missouri, United States
- Area served: Missouri
- Revenue: $13.9 million (2015)
- Number of employees: 110 (2014)
- Website: www.wearewoodruff.com

Woodruff, previously known as Woodruff Sweitzer, is an American advertising agency founded in Columbia, Missouri by Terry Woodruff. Woodruff has worked with various national and regional clients including Bayer HealthCare's Animal Health Division, Arysta LifeScience Corp, Diamond Pet Foods, Missouri Farm Bureau Insurance, and the University of Missouri's Athletics Department.

In 2007, Woodruff was selected to produce Boone County National Bank's 150th anniversary campaign, which led to Woodruff working with its parent company, Central Bancompany.

In 2016, Woodruff Sweitzer was included on the Inc. 5000 list of America's fastest growing private companies. The company has offices in Columbia, Missouri, Kansas City, Missouri and Minneapolis, Minnesota.

== History ==
Terry Woodruff founded Woodruff Communications (originally Woodruff & Associates) in 1992. Originally staffed by the founder and his wife, the company expanded into an office in Kansas City, Missouri and another in Calgary, Alberta, Canada. In 2004, Steve Sweitzer was hired as chief creative officer and the agency was rebranded as Woodruff Sweitzer.

Woodruff worked with Boone County National Bank to celebrate the bank's 150th anniversary in 2007. As a result, they produced the Roots N Blues N BBQ Festival, which has become a Columbia tradition and brought in 52,000 people from 35 states in 2012. When the bank later changed its name to Central Bank of Boone County, Woodruff examined customer behavior to develop a brand strategy surrounding the new name.

One of Woodruff's early clients, Arysta LifeScience, worked with Woodruff for over 15 years and became the world's largest privately held agricultural company. Woodruff began working with Bayer HealthCare's Animal Health Division in 2005, and in July 2008 was named Bayer's "agency of record" (the single agency responsible for all the services that a particular business might require). In 2011, Boehringer Ingelheim Vetmedica, Inc. (BIVI) selected Woodruff as its public relations agency of record for its swine products division. Woodruff had been working on BIVI's swine vaccines since 2009.

== Acquisition ==
In July 2012, the company acquired Paradowski Creative and expanded into St. Louis. Paradowski Creative was founded by Alex Paradowski and has worked with clients including The Wine Group, Monsanto, Anheuser-Busch InBev and Solae. Steve Sweitzer retired from the company in April 2015. In May 2015, Woodruff expanded into the Minneapolis-St. Paul market through the acquisition of Confluence Marketing.

The National Agri-Marketing Association honored Woodruff at its National Best of NAMA Awards in April 2016 with two first place awards in "Company or Association Magazine, External" for cwt, a magazine for potato growers, as well as "Billboards or Other Outdoor Ads" for its SmartBlock billboards.

In 2017, at the company's 25th annual meeting, it was announced that the company was rebranding as simply "Woodruff" and it would be employee-owned moving forward.
