= Market Street Power Plant =

Coordinates: 29°55′48″N 90°3′51″W

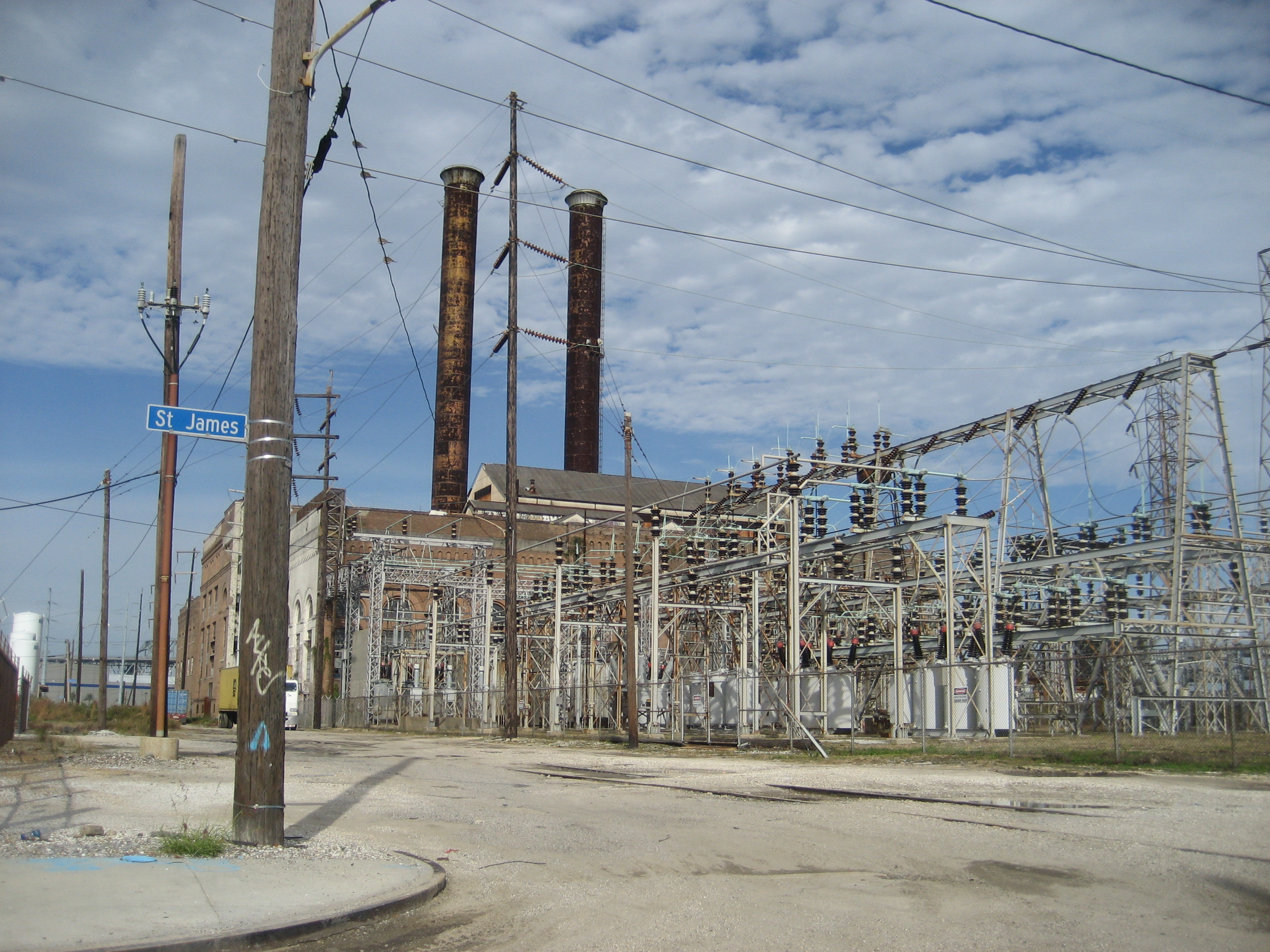
2009

The Market Street Power Plant is a defunct early 20th Century power plant in New Orleans, Louisiana. It is located along the Mississippi River just upriver of the Crescent City Connection and Ernest N. Morial Convention Center. The plant was constructed in 1905 and last produced power in 1973 when it was part of New Orleans Public Service, Inc. In early 2007, Entergy New Orleans sold the plant and surrounding property to Market Street Properties LLC for $10 million.

In September 2015, the plant was sold to developer Joe Jaeger in foreclosure after the proposed development of a residential, retail, and entertainment center never moved forward. There are no immediate plans for development because Jaeger is focused on development of the nearby Trade District on 47 acres (19 ha) between the power plant and Convention Center. Jaeger says that he plans to later incorporate the Power Plant development with the Trade District project, which still does not have clear scope or start/finish dates.

In early 2022, "Lauricella Land Company, Brian Gibbs Development and Cypress Equities announced that they have closed on a deal to invest in the historic New Orleans Market Street Power Plant building and surrounding acreage. Lauricella, Gibbs and Cypress are also part of The River District team that recently won the bid to develop the vacant land that sits between the Ernest N. Morial Convention Center and the Market Street Power Plant. Once completed, the Market Street Power Plant will be transformed into a unique, new-to-market concept with entertainment, retail, hotel and creative office space as well as food and beverage experiences".

The plant has been a subject of concern over the years because it has been frequented by vagrants and is contaminated with asbestos. It has proven to be hazardous for urban explorers but was not adequately secured against their entry. On July 31, 2022, 18 year old Anthony Clawson plunged to his death when a platform collapsed as he was descending from the roof. According to the New Orleans Police Department, there had been 10 calls for service to the power plant site earlier that year for reports of prowlers, suspicious persons and for medical attention.
