= International Chamber Music Festival (Plovdiv) =

Music festival in Bulgaria

International Chamber Music Festival in Plovdiv
- Logo
- Genre: Chamber music
- Locations: Plovdiv, Bulgaria
- Years active: 1964–present

The International Chamber Music Festival in Plovdiv, Bulgaria, was founded in 1964 by a group of music enthusiasts, with the support of the Plovdiv Municipality and the Ministry of Culture.

== History ==
With each year the music event established itself as a tradition for the city and the region, featuring in its long history the names of many celebrated musicians, such as Yfrah Neaman, Michael Frischenschlager, the duo Emil Kamilarov and Dina Schneidermann, Stoika Milanova, Yuri Bukov, Mincho Minchev, and many more, premiere performances of musical compositions, celebrations of composers, conductors, ensembles, and solo performers of chamber music.

During its half-century history the festival has been organized and managed in different ways and methods, but its invariable aim has been to offer performances by some of the best chamber artists to the Plovdiv audience.

A foundation of the same name was created in the 1980s, and active members in it were the conductor Plamen Djurov, Jivko Jekov (director of the Regional Concert Agency), Georgi Ivanov, and others.

The selection and preparation of the annual festival programs are performed by an advisory board, on which have served distinguished Bulgarian musicians – Anastas Slavchev, Georgi Kanev, Alexandar Spirov, Krikor Chetinyan, Julian Kujumdziev, Plina Kujumdzieva, Veselin Emanuilov, Adelina Kaludova, Julia Manolova, Polia Paunova-Tosheva, and others.

In 2008 the new market circumstances for the cultural processes in the country demanded the creation and application of a statute for the preparation, organization, and realization of the festival, as a means and grounds for its renovation and contemporary image. As defined in the established statute, the International Chamber Music Festival, Plovdiv, is managed and directed by a coordinating council with the Plovdiv Municipality, presided by the head of the Culture Department, and producer and organizer is the Interart Fest Association. Dimitar Malashinov is a long-standing manager of the festival.

During the period from 1986 until 2016 the festival has been organized by the Muzika Agency, the Interart Fest Association, and their long-time manager Dimitar Malashinov.
