= Caddywhompus =

American band based in New Orleans

- Origin: Houston, Texas, U.S.
- Genres: Alternative emo, indie rock, noise pop
- Years active: 2008–present
- Members: Chris Rehm; Sean Hart
- Website: Bandcamp

Caddywhompus is an American band based in New Orleans. The band originally referred to themselves as a noise pop band, although they later stopped using that descriptor. The band members, Chris Rehm and Sean Hart, both grew up in Houston and have been friends since kindergarten.

== Albums ==
- Odd Hours (2017)
- Feathering A Nest (2014)
- Remainder (2010)

== EPs ==
- The Weight (2011)
- Caddywhompus (2008)

== Compilations ==
- EPs (2009)
