= Maury Rosenberg =

American singer-songwriter

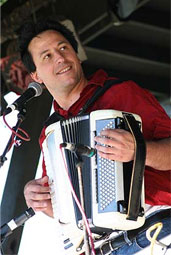

Background information
- Born: December 18, 1964 (age 61); Long Beach, New York, U.S.
- Genres: Polka, Cajun music, zydeco, klezmer, dance music, jazz, reggae, rock, bluegrass, funk
- Occupations: Singer-songwriter, musician
- Instruments: Vocals, accordion, keyboards, piano
- Years active: 1982–present

Maury Rosenberg (born December 18, 1964) is an American singer-songwriter and accordionist from Long Beach, New York. He graduated from the Berklee College of Music, in Boston, Massachusetts. Rosenberg is most well known as the frontman of Hypnotic Clambake.

== Biography ==
Rosenberg grew up in Long Beach, New York, the son of a Holocaust survivor. His exposure to Jewish culture in New York played an influential role in his musical development. Throughout his career he would go on to incorporate elements of Jewish music into many of his projects. He moved to Boston to attend the Berklee College of Music, where he completed a Bachelor of Arts degree in film scoring in 1987.

Early in his career, Rosenberg worked with the Boston Ballet as a rehearsal pianist. During his time in Boston, he also worked with musical groups Border Patrol and the Shirim Klezmer Orchestra. Some of his piano work was used in Woody Allen's 1997 film Deconstructing Harry.

In 1989, Rosenberg founded the group Hypnotic Clambake. The project was originally meant only for the recording studio, though Rosenberg later decided to assemble a touring group, thus beginning the band's long and ever-evolving live performance career. Hypnotic Clambake is currently based in Rochester, New York. Rosenberg also performs occasionally with the bands Zydeco Vacation and the New York Klezmer Orchestra.

== Discography ==
- Shirim Klezmer Orchestra: Naftule's Dream (1992)
- New York Klezmer Orchestra (2004)

Hypnotic Clambake discography:

- Square Dance Messiah (1991)
- Gondola to Heaven (1993)
- Kent the Zen Master (1995)
- Frozen Live, Vol. 1 (1997)
- White Christmas Stallion (1997)
- Rutland Live – New Year's Eve (1999–2000)
- Varicose Brain (2001)
- Mayonnaise (2005)
