= Zephyr International Chamber Music Festival =

Music festival in Italy

- Genre: Chamber music
- Dates: July – August
- Locations: Piemonte & Liguria, Italy
- Years active: 2003–present
- Website: https://www.zephyrmusicfest.org/

The Zephyr International Chamber Music Festival, also known as the Zephyr Music Festival, is an annual summer chamber music program and concert series held in Italy. The festival brings together a small group of emerging professional musicians for intensive rehearsals and performance experiences embedded in ensembles with a faculty of internationally recognized artists.

== History ==
The festival was established in 2003 and has run annually for more than two decades, attracting participants and audiences from across Asia, Europe, and North America. The festival was founded by renowned pianist Mack McCray, who serves as the Artistic Director, and Meikui Matsushima, who serves as Administrative Director.

Ensembles formed or developed at Zephyr (such as the Thalea String Quartet) have gone on to win prizes and perform internationally, illustrating the festival’s role in artistic development, and the festival continues to be recognized by institutions like Fischoff National Chamber Music Association for its role in music education and professional development. Alumni can be found in symphony orchestras across the world and on faculty at leading conservatories and universities.

== Locations ==
The festival has been hosted in many alpine towns including Courmayeur and Frabosa Soprana, and the coastal town of Moneglia (Liguria), with additional concerts in nearby towns including Aosta, Alba (Piedmont), Limone Piemonte, Cuneo, Manarola, Riomaggiore, Carrara, Santa Margherita Ligure, and countless other venues over the festival's twenty-year history. Regional media in Piedmont has covered the festival’s concerts and community impact.

== Program ==
Approximately sixteen emerging artists are selected to participate in the annual Zephyr program. The program includes intensive chamber music coaching, rehearsals with faculty, and master classes for strings, clarinet, and piano. Participants perform alongside faculty in multiple public concerts during the festival. The festival tours northern Italy, offering many performance experiences in many prominent venues and locations.
