= Missouri Chamber Music Festival =

The Missouri Chamber Music Festival (MOCM) and Adult Chamber Music Intensive (ACMI) were founded in 2010. The goal of the MOCM Festival concerts is to present the fine art of small ensemble music to a wide audience through an accessible, community-based festival. The ACMI workshop is the educational portion of the festival, placing adult instrumentalists in chamber ensembles with Festival artists for coaching and performance.

== History ==
The MOCM Festival and ACMI was incorporated by Scott Andrews and Nina Ferrigno in 2010 and presented its inaugural season in June 2011. The initial MOCM advisory board included Gil Rose, music director, Boston Modern Orchestra Project and Odyssey Opera; David Robertson, Music Director Emeritus, Saint Louis Symphony Orchestra; Jennifer Lucht, Calyx Piano Trio; Marc Thayer, executive director of Symphony New Hampshire; and Christopher Stark, Assistant Professor of Composition at Washington University in St. Louis.

== Festival leadership ==
Co-founder and artistic director Nina Ferrigno is a pianist who appears at major concert venues throughout North America. Ferrigno is a founding member of the Boston-based Calyx Piano Trio. She was the long-time member/director of the AUROS Group for New Music and is committed to bringing classical music to new audiences by performing and commissioning new works in a variety of settings. She is the director of Keyboard Studies at Webster University and is on the faculty of Arts & Sciences at Washington University in St. Louis.

=== Current Board of Directors ===
- Siroth Charnond, president
- Linda Peterson, vice president
- Jonathan Shulan
- Janice Seele
- Julie Schuster
- Gabriel Steinbach
- Joseph Hendricks
- Sara Bucy
- Brian McGraw
- Tai Lin

== Events ==
Three evening concerts and one morning concert highlight the annual MOCM Festival each June. The 2027 Festival concerts will be held between June 8–19, at The Sheldon Concert Hall in St. Louis.

The Adult Chamber Music Intensive is a week-long workshop for adult instrumentalists. The 2027 ACMI workshop takes place June 1–6 at the Community Music School of Webster University.

Other events throughout the year include an annual Trivia Night, informal chamber music reading parties, and various private house concerts.

== Programs ==
Missouri Chamber Music regularly programs works by living composers, including commissioning new works. In 2026, the world premiere of David Werfelmann's Memoria was performed on June 21.

Programs from the 2026 Festival concerts:

June 10, 2026

- Copland: Selections from 12 Poems of Emily Dickinson
- Sollima: Sonnets et Rondeaux
- Fauré: Piano Quartet in C minor, Op. 15

June 15, 2026

- Vaughan Williams: 6 Studies in English Folk Songs
- Rebecca Clarke: Prelude, Allegro, Pastoral
- Sollima: Sonnets et Rondeaux
- Weir: Musicians Wrestle Everywhere

June 17, 2026

- Augusta Read Thomas: Upon Wings of Words
- Tchaikovsky: String Quartet No. 1 in D major, Op. 11

June 21, 2026

- David Werfelmann: Memoria* (world premiere)
- Kats-Chernin: Calliope Dreaming
- Beethoven: Piano Trio in G major, Op. 1, No. 2

Programs from the 2019 Festival concerts:

June 17, 2019

- Borodin - String Trio in G minor for 2 violins and cello
- Ligeti - Six Bagatelles for Woodwind Quintet
- Janáček - Mladi for Woodwind Sextet
- Smetana - String Quartet No. 1, "From My Life"

June 19, 2019

- Debussy - Premiere rhapsodie for clarinet and piano
- Debussy - Piano Trio in G Major
- Debussy - Sonata No.1 for cello and piano
- Debussy - Sonata No. 2 for violin and piano

June 20, 2019

- Lash - Around
- Dvorak - Piano Trio No. 4, Op. 90, Dumky

June 22, 2019

- Lash - Start, for solo snare drum
- Schumann - Fantasie in C Major, Op. 17 (arr. Lash)
- Lash - Folksongs for flute, percussion, and harp
- Lash - Frayed for String Quartet
- Debussy - Sonata for flute, viola, and harp

== Festival musicians ==
MOCM has a roster of professional musicians from the St. Louis area and beyond, including violinists Hannah Ji and Nathan Lowry, violists Sixto Franco and Alejandro Valdepeñas, cellist Davin Rubicz, bassist Brendan Fitzgerald, flutist Nadine Hur, clarinetists Robert Walker and Aleksis Martin, horn player Julie Thayer, trombonist Amanda Stewart, percussionist Kevin Ritenauer, pianists Shen Wen and Nina Ferrigno, conductor James Sommerville, the Arianna String Quartet, and the Calyx Piano Trio.

Its 2019 season musicians included harpist and composer Hannah Lash, flutist Jennifer Nitchman, oboist Jelena Dirks, bass clarinetist Tzuying Huang, bassoonist Andrew Cuneo, horn player Roger Kaza, percussionist Michael Compitello, pianist Mia Hynes, violinists Catherine French, Eva Kozma, and Angie Smart, violists Michael Casimir and Chris Tantillo, cellists Elizabeth Chung and Jennifer Lucht, the Calyx Piano Trio, and MOCM Festival Directors Scott Andrews, clarinet and Nina Ferrigno, piano.

== Location ==
Beginning in 2026, MOCM has partnered with The Sheldon to present its four annual festival performances at its Concert Hall.

Past festival seasons have taken place at the First Congregational Church of Webster Groves, 560 Music Center of Washington University, Graham Chapel on the Danforth Campus of Washington University, and more.

The ACMI workshop is hosted by the Community Music School at Webster University in Webster Groves, MO.
