= North Lawrence, Ohio =

- CDP
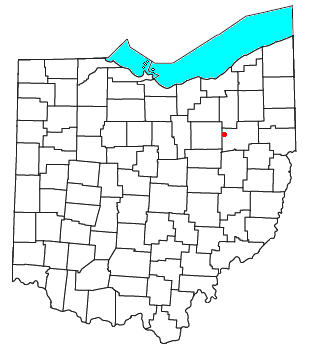
- Location of North Lawrence, Ohio
- Coordinates: 40°50′28″N 81°37′45″W
- Country: United States
- State: Ohio
- County: Stark
- Township: Lawrence
- Elevation: 1,001 ft (305 m)

Population (2020)
  - Total: 212
- Time zone: UTC-5 (Eastern (EST))
  - Summer (DST): UTC-4 (EDT)
- ZIP code: 44666
- GNIS feature ID: 2628946

North Lawrence is a census-designated place in southwestern Lawrence Township, Stark County, Ohio, United States. It has a post office with the ZIP code 44666. The community is part of the Canton–Massillon Metropolitan Statistical Area. The population was 212 at the 2020 census.

== History ==
North Lawrence was originally called Lawrence, and under the latter name was laid out in 1852. The community derives its name from the township in which it is located. A post office called North Lawrence was established in 1854. North Lawrence includes Bowdil, Ohio.
