= List of classical music festivals =

The following is an incomplete list of classical music festivals – music festivals focused on classical music. Classical music is art music produced or rooted in the traditions of Western music (both liturgical and secular), and has long been played at festival-like settings. It encompasses a broad span of time from roughly the 11th century to the present day. The major time divisions of classical music are as follows: the early music period, which includes the Medieval (500–1400) and the Renaissance (1400–1600) era, played at early music festivals; the common practice period, which includes the Baroque (1600–1750), Classical (1750–1830), and Romantic eras (1804–1910), which included opera festivals and choral festivals; and the 20th century (1901–2000) which includes the modern (1890–1930) that overlaps from the late 19th-century, the high modern (mid 20th-century), and contemporary classical music festivals or postmodern (1975–2000) eras, the last of which overlaps into the 21st-century. The term "classical music" did not appear until the early 19th century, in an attempt to distinctly canonize the period from Johann Sebastian Bach to Beethoven as a golden age.

== Related lists, categories, and media ==
List	Category	Media
List of classical music festivals	Classical music festivals Classical music festivals by country	Classical music festivals Classical music festivals by country
List of music festivals	Music festivals	Music festivals
List of early music festivals	Early music festivals	Early music festivals
List of chamber music festivals	Chamber music festivals	Chamber music festivals
List of choral festivals	Choral festivals	Choral festivals
List of Indian classical music festivals		Indian classical music festivals
List of opera festivals	Opera festivals	Opera festivals
List of Bach festivals	Bach festivals	Bach festivals
List of Christian music festivals	Christian music festivals	Christian music festivals
	Contemporary classical festivals	Contemporary classical festivals
List of experimental music festivals	Experimental music festivals	Experimental music festivals
	Electroacoustic festivals	Electroacoustic festivals

== Festivals ==
=== Africa ===
Festival name	Location	Years	Notes
Festival international de musique symphonique d'El Jem	Tunisia; El Djem	1985–present	Held every summer
Greyton Genadendal Classics for All	South Africa	2003–present	Held third weekend in May each year
Stellenbosch International Chamber Music Festival	South Africa	2003–present	Held in July each year
Nosy Be Symphonies – Festival de Musique Classique de l'Océan Indien	Madagascar	2014–present	Held end of August each year
Klein Karoo Klassique	South Africa	2009–present	Held beginning of August each year

=== Asia ===
Festival name	Location	Years	Notes
Abu Dhabi Festival	United Arab Emirates; Abu Dhabi	2004–present	Classical music, ballet, opera, jazz
Khachaturian International Festival	Yerevan, Armenia	2013–present	Works of Aram Khachaturian and his contemporaries
Kuthiramalika Festival	India; Thiruvananthapuram	?–present	At shrine built by Swathi Thirunal Rama Varma
Sarvani Sangeetha Sabha	India; Chennai	1986–present	Encouraging young talents
Parampara Series – Andhri	India; Hyderabad	1997–present	Asian classical music
Swathi Sangeethotsavam	India; Trivandrum	2000–present	Asian classical music
The Hindu Friday Review Music Festival	India; Chennai	2005–present	Asian classical music
All Pakistan Music Conference	Pakistan; Lahore	1959–present	Qawaali, classical, pop, rock, hamd, ghazel
Israel Festival	Israel; Jerusalem	1961–present	Arts festival with classical focus
Istanbul International Music Festival	Turkey; Istanbul	1973–present	Classical music, ballet, opera, traditional music
Mersin International Music Festival	Turkey; Mersin	2002–present	Classical, jazz, pop
Gümüşlük International Classical Music Festival	Turkey; Gümüşlük	2004–present	And Eklisia summer school
Tokyo Summer Festival	Japan; Tokyo	1985–present	Mixed genres
Pacific Music Festival	Japan; Sapporo	1990–present	Performers from major orchestras serve as faculty.
Seiji Ozawa Matsumoto Festival	Japan; Matsumoto	1992–present	Held in August and September
Beijing Music Festival	China; Beijing	1998–present	Founded by the Chinese government
Great Wall International Music Academy	China; Beijing	2005–present	Month-long classical music institute
Tongyeong International Music Festival	South Korea; Tongyeong	2002–present	Large event with multiple genres
Isang Yun Competition	South Korea; Tongyeong	2003–present	Classical competition
Daegu International Opera Festival	South Korea; Daegu	2003–present	Multiple features beyond main opera
Music in PyeongChang	South Korea; PyeongChang	2004–present	Chamber music festival
Beigang International Music Festival	Taiwan; Beigang	2006–present	Beigang Philharmonic Association
Bengal Classical Music Festival	Bangladesh; Dhaka	2012–present	South Asian classical music

=== Europe ===
Festival name	Location	Years	Notes
World Peace Choral Festival	Austria	2010–present	
Nordic Music Days	(several)	1888–present	Held in Denmark, Finland, Germany, Iceland, Norway
Grafenegg Festival	Austria	2007–present	
KlangBogen Wien	Austria	1995–2006	
Salzburg Festival	Austria	1920–present	
Salzburg Easter Festival	Austria	1967–present	
Salzburg Whitsun Festival	Austria	1973–present	
Mozart Week	Austria	1956–present	
Styriarte	Austria	1985–present	International festival, held in Graz and Styria
Vienna Spring Festival	Austria	1992–present	
Summa Cum Laude Festival	Austria	2007–present	
Gabala International Music Festival	Azerbaijan	2009–present	
Mstislav Rostropovich Baku International Festival	Azerbaijan	2007–present	
Uzeyir Hajibeyov International Music Festival	Azerbaijan	2009–present	
XXIV International Society for Contemporary Music Festival	Belgium	1950	
Bachfestival Antwerpen	Belgium	2021–present	
Laus Polyphoniae	Belgium	1994–present	
International Chamber Music Festival Plovdiv	Bulgaria	1964–present	
March Music Days	Bulgaria	–present	
Music Biennale Zagreb	Croatia	1961–present	
The International Music Festival of F. L. Vek	Czech Republic	–present	
Janáček Music Festival	Czech Republic	1976–present	
Prague Autumn International Music Festival	Czech Republic	1991–2008	
Prague Spring International Music Festival	Czech Republic	1946–present	
Aldeburgh Festival	England		
Bampton Classical Opera	England		
Bath International Music Festival	England		
Birmingham Triennial Music Festival	England	1784–1912	
Brighton Early Music Festival	England		
Dartington International Summer School	England		
English Music Festival	England		
Harrogate International Festivals	England		
Hastings Musical Festival	England		
Henley Festival	England		
Hoffnung Music Festival	England		
Investec International Music Festival	England	2010–present	
King's Lynn Festival (classical music)	England	1951–present	
Leeds Festival	England		
Leeds Lieder	England		
Oundle International Festival	England		
Oxford International Piano Festival	England		
Oxford Lieder Festival	England		
Prom on The Close	England		
The Proms	England	1895–	
Southern Cathedrals Festival	England	1904–	
Spitalfields Music	England		
St Albans International Organ Festival	England		
Swaledale Festival	England		
Three Choirs Festival	England	1719–	
Tilford Bach Festival	England		
Two Moors Festival	England		
York Early Music Festival	England		
Aix-en-Provence Festival	France	1948–present	
Besançon International Music Festival	France	1948–present	
Festival International de Musique Saint-Georges	France	2018–present	Held in Guadeloupe
Festival des Nuits Romantiques	France		
Forest Festival	France		
La Folle Journée	France		
Musica	France		
Musique-Cordiale	France	2005–present	
Opéra de Baugé	France		
Strasbourg Music Festival	France		
Bachfest Leipzig	Germany	1904–present	Early Bach festival
Bachwoche Ansbach	Germany	1947–present	Bonn
Bayreuth Festival	Germany	1876–present	Wagner opera festival
Bayreuther Osterfestival	Germany	1994–present	Easter festival
Beethovenfest	Germany	1845–present	Beethoven festival
Braunschweig Classix Festival	Germany	1988–present	
Classic Festival Germany Impressions - Masterclasses, Schools & Orchestra	Germany	2019–present	Classical music between generations and cultures: Impressions – an intergenerational classical music festival in Weimar featuring schools, masterclasses, and a festival orchestra.
Dresden Music Festival	Germany	1978–present	
Göttingen International Handel Festival	Germany	1919–present	Devoted to Handel
Heidelberger Frühling	Germany	1997–present	International festival
InterHarmony International Music Festival	Germany	1997–present	International festival
Internationale Maifestspiele Wiesbaden	Germany	1896–present	International theatre festival
Intonations	Germany	2012-present	international Chamber Music Festival; founded by Jelena Dmitrijewna Baschkirowa
Kissinger Sommer	Germany	1986–present	
Klavier-Festival Ruhr	Germany	1988–present	Piano festival; classical music and jazz; lasts more than three months
Lower Rhenish Music Festival	Germany	1818–1958	Early classical festival held on Pentecost
Magdeburger Telemann-Festtage	Germany	1962–present	Devoted to the works of Telemann
Rheingau Musik Festival	Germany	1987–present	Concerts take place at a culturally important location.
Schleswig-Holstein Musik Festival	Germany	1986–present	Summer festival
Sommerliche Musiktage Hitzacker	Germany	1946–present	Summer chamber music festival
Ardee Baroque Festival	Ireland	–present	
Cork International Choral Festival	Ireland	–present	
Lismore Opera Festival	Ireland	–present	
New Ross Piano Festival	Ireland	–present	
Wexford Festival Opera	Ireland	1951–present	
West Cork Chamber Music Festival	Ireland	1995–present	Bantry
Altschuler Summer Music Institute	Italy	2019–present	
Settimane Musicali al Teatro Olimpico di Vicenza	Italy	1992–present	
CIMA Festival	Italy	–present	
Bologna Festival	Italy	1982 –present	
InterHarmony International Music Festival	Italy	–present	
Zephyr International Chamber Music Festival	Italy	2003–present	
Riga Jurmala Music Festival	Latvia	2019–present	
Bergen International Festival	Norway	–present	
Chopin Festival	Poland	–present	
Chopin and his Europe	Poland	2005–present	
Oeiras International Piano Festival	Portugal	2018–present	Piano summer festival
Cistermúsica	Portugal	1993–present	In Alcobaça
Organ Festival of Braga	Portugal Braga	2014–present	
Madeira PianoFest	Portugal Funchal	2015–present	
EUROPAfest	Romania	–present	
George Enescu Festival	Romania	–present	
Festival Vara Magica	Romania	2011–present	
Radiro - International Radio Orchestras Festival	Romania	–present	
Toamna Muzicală Clujeană	Romania	1965–present	
Edinburgh International Festival	Scotland	1947–present	
Belgrade Music Festival	Serbia	1969–present	
Košice Music Spring Festival	Slovakia	1956–present	
Festival Castell de Peralada	Spain	1987–present	
Festival de Música de Segovia	Spain	1978–present	
Festival de Música Española de Cádiz	Spain	2003–present	Devoted to Spanish music
Festival de Música Antigua de Aranjuez	Spain	1993–present	Devoted to early music
Festival de Música Antigua de Gijón	Spain	1998–present	Devoted to early music
Festival de Música Antigua de Sevilla	Spain	1983–present	Devoted to early music
Festival de Música Antigua de Úbeda y Baeza	Spain	1997–present	Devoted to early music
Festival de Música Renacentista y Barroca de Vélez Blanco	Spain	2001–present	Devoted to early music
Festival de Pollença	Spain	1962–present	
Festival de Torroella de Montgrí	Spain	1982–present	
Festival En el Camino de Santiago	Spain	1992–present	
Festival Ibérico de Música de Badajoz	Spain	1984–present	
Festival Internacional de Música de Canarias	Spain	1985–present	
Festival Internacional de Música y Danza de Granada	Spain	1952–present	
Festival Internacional de Santander	Spain	1952–present	
Festival Otoño Musical Soriano	Spain	1992–present	
Musika-Música	Spain	2000–present	
Quincena Musical de San Sebastián	Spain	1939–present	
Semana de Música Religiosa de Cuenca	Spain	1962–present	Devoted to sacred music
Gstaad Menuhin Festival & Academy	Switzerland	1957–present	
Lucerne Festival	Switzerland	1938–present	
Festival Musikdorf Ernen	Switzerland	1974–present	
Nox Illuminata	Switzerland	2004–present	
Verbier Festival	Switzerland	1956–present	
Festival Oude Muziek	Netherlands	1982–present	
Holland Festival	Netherlands	1947–present	
Gümüşlük International Classical Music Festival	Turkey	–present	
Istanbul International Music Festival	Turkey	–present	
Mersin International Music Festival	Turkey	–present	
Kyiv Music Fest	Ukraine	–present	
LvivMozArt	Ukraine	2017–present	
North Wales International Music Festival	Wales	1972–present	

=== North America ===
Festival name	Location	Years	Notes
Brott Music Festival	Canada	1988–present	Multiple genres
Bach Music Festival of Canada	Canada	2011–present	Bach festival
Domaine Forget	Canada	–present	
Festival 500	Canada	–present	
Festival of the Sound	Canada	–present	
Kiwanis Music Festival	Canada	–present	
Mondial Choral	Canada	–present	
Montreal Festivals	Canada, Montreal	–present	
Music and Beyond	Canada	–present	
New Brunswick Summer Music Festival	Canada, New Brunswick	–present	
Ottawa Chamberfest	Canada, Ottawa	–present	
Quebec City Summer Festival	Canada, Quebec	–present	
Quebec Contemporary Music Society	Canada, Quebec	–present	
Stratford Summer Music Festival	Canada	–present	
Toronto Summer Music Festival	Canada, Toronto	–present	
Tuckamore Festival	Canada	–present	
Addicott Summer Chamber Music Festival	United States	2025-present	
American Festival for the Arts	United States		
Annual Avant Garde Festival of New York	United States		
Aspen Music Festival and School	United States		
ASME@WAU Music Festival	United States, Washington D.C.	-present	
Bard Music Festival	United States		
Bear Valley Music Festival	United States	1967–present	Multiple Generes
Bellingham Festival of Music	United States		
Blossom Festival	United States		
Bowdoin International Music Festival	United States		
Bravo! Vail	United States		
Brevard Music Center	United States		
Bridgehampton Chamber Music Festival	United States		
Caramoor Summer Music Festival	United States		
Carmel Bach Festival	United States		
Chamber Music Northwest	United States		
Chestnut Hill Concerts	United States		
Cincinnati May Festival	United States		
Colorado MahlerFest	United States		
Colorado Music Festival	United States		
Festival Mozaic, San Luis Obispo	United States, California	1971–present	Multiple genres
Festival Napa Valley	United States		
Festival of Neglected Romantic Music	United States		
Festival of New Trumpet Music	United States		
Fine Arts Summer Academy (FASA)	United States		
Grand Teton Music Festival	United States		
Grant Park Music Festival	United States		
Hot Springs Music Festival	United States		
Kneisel Hall	United States		
Lake George Music Festival	United States		
La Musica	United States		
Laguna Beach Chamber Music Society	United States		
Los Angeles Philharmonic Institute	United States		
Mainly Mozart Festival	United States		
MasterWorks Festival	United States		
Meadowmount School of Music	United States	1944–present	
Mendocino Music Festival	United States		
Michigan City Chamber Music Festival	United States	2001-present	
Midsummer Mozart Festival	United States		
Mineral Point Chamber Music Festival	United States	2017–present	This annual June festival features advanced university-level ensembles
Missouri Chamber Music Festival	United States		
Mostly Modern Festival	United States	2018–	The focus of the festival is "mostly modern": music by living composers from around the world, with occasional works from the standard repertoire.
Mostly Mozart Festival	United States		
Music Academy of the West	United States		
Music@Menlo	United States		
Music from Angel Fire	United States	1984–present	Music from Angel Fire celebrates extraordinary chamber music in the Northern New Mexico communities of Angel Fire, Taos, Raton and Las Vegas.
Music House International	United States	1997–present	Study with members of the Philadelphia Orchestra
Music in the Mountains	United States, Colorado		
Music Mountain	United States	1930–present	June through September annually; devoted to the string quartet and other chamber music; Twilight series of jazz, swing, etc. Education programs, master classes, etc.
National Music Festival	United States, Chestertown, Maryland	2010–present	First two weeks of June annually
Newport Music Festival	United States		
Norfolk Chamber Music Festival	United States		
Northern Lights Music Festival	United States	2003–present	The Northern Lights Music Festival is a three week classical music performance program and music school which is held each summer on the Minnesota Iron Range.
Ojai Music Festival	United States		
OK Mozart Festival	United States		
Olympic Music Festival	United States		
Omnipresent Music Festival	United States	2021–present	Omnipresent Music Festival - BIPOC Musicians Festival. This is a music festival that showcases the historical significance of BIPOC (Black, Indigenous, People of Color) professional musicians and composers while entertaining communities and inspiring youth with musical performances that span all genres of music.
Oregon Bach Festival	United States		
Other Minds Festival	United States	1993–present	Focus on contemporary classical and experimental music
Park City International Music Festival	United States		
Philadelphia International Music Camp & Festival	United States	1997–present	Study with members of the Philadelphia Orchestra
Piano Summer	United States		
Portland Chamber Music Festival	United States		
Rockport Music	United States		
Santa Fe Chamber Music Festival	United States		
Sarasota Music Festival	United States		
Sitka Summer Music Festival	United States		
Strings Music Festival	United States		
Worcester Music Festival	United States, Massachusetts	–present	
West Side Orchestral Concerts	United States	–present	
Vermont Mozart Festival	United States, Vermont	–present	
Tanglewood Music Center	United States	–present	
Classical/Pops Festival	Barbados	2014–present	Held yearly in December
Casals Festival	Puerto Rico		

=== Oceania ===
Festival name	Location	Years	Notes
Intervarsity Choral Festival	Australia	1950–present	Choral festival
Melbourne International Arts Festival	Australia	1986–present	Held for 17 days each October
Canberra International Music Festival	Australia	1994–present	Held at the end of April annually
G-TARanaki Guitar Festival	New Zealand	2008–present	Guitar focus

=== South America ===
Festival name	Location	Years	Notes
Semana Musical Llao Llao	Argentina	1993–present	Held yearly in October
Septiembre Musical	Argentina	1960–present	Arts festival
Ilumina Festival	Brazil	2015–present	Chamber music festival
Festival Amazonas de Ópera	Brazil	1997–present	Opera festival
Festival de Música Coral Renascentista	Brazil	2017–present	Reinassance music festival for 3 days
Natal Luz	Brazil	1986–present	Classical Christmas concert
Frutillar Musical Weeks	Chile	1968–present	Between January and February, 10 days
Boyacá International Cultural Festival	Colombia	1973–present	Cultural and arts festival with classical music
International Festival of Lyric Singing	Peru	1996–present	International vocalists
International Music Festival Alfredo de Saint Malo	Panama	2006–present	Platform for musical and cultural exchange
