= Ronald Thomas (cellist) =

American cellist (born 1954)

Ronald Thomas (born 1954) is an American cellist performing as a soloist and chamber musician. Thomas has made guest appearances with the Philadelphia Orchestra, the Saint Louis Symphony Orchestra, the Baltimore Symphony Orchestra, the Seattle Symphony Orchestra, the Hong Kong Philharmonic, the Handel and Haydn Society, the Pro Arte Chamber Orchestra of Boston, and the Blossom Festival Orchestra, and other orchestras. He has played recitals in most US states, including performances in the cities of New York, Washington, D.C., Boston, and Los Angeles. Thomas has also performed throughout Europe and Asia.

== Biography ==
Thomas first studied cello with Mary Canberg before attending the New England Conservatory of Music and the Curtis Institute in Philadelphia where his principal teachers were Lorne Munroe and David Soyer. He won the Young Concert Artists International Auditions in 1974 at the age of nineteen, and since then has appeared as a soloist with orchestras internationally.

Ronald Thomas became the Principal Cellist of the St. Paul Chamber orchestra in 2005. Thomas is the former co-founder and artistic director of the Boston Chamber Music Society, where he spent 26 years performing and directing until 2009. He has also appeared with the Seattle Chamber Music Society and the Chamber Music Society of Lincoln Center both at Alice Tully Hall and on tour. Other chamber music appearances include the La Musica, Music@Menlo, Sarasota Music Festival, Music from Angel Fire, Music in the Mountains, Portland Chamber Music Festival, Santa Fe Chamber Music Festival, Bravo! Vail Valley Music Festival, Festival dei Due Mondi, Blossom Music Festival, Chamber Music Northwest, Sarasota Music Festival, the Norfolk Chamber Music Festival, the Dubrovnik Festival, Edinburgh Festival, Amsterdam Festival, and others.

Thomas is the artistic director of Chestnut Hill Concerts of Madison, CT and was an original member of the Players in Residence committee and the Board of Overseers at Bargemusic in New York City. Thomas was a member of Boston Musica Viva and the Aeolian Chamber Players, with which he premiered new works by Gunther Schuller, Michael Colgrass, Ellen Taaffe Zwilich, Donald Erb, William Bolcom, William Thomas McKinley, and others.

Thomas is a former member of the faculties at M.I.T., Brown University, the Boston Conservatory and the Peabody Conservatory of Music in Baltimore, where he spent nine years until 1997. Thomas is married to violist Cynthia Phelps; they live just outside New York City in Leonia, N.J., while Thomas maintains a secondary residence in St. Paul, MN. They have three daughters: Lili (by Thomas' marriage to Mihae Lee), Christina (by Phelps' marriage to baritone David Malis), and Caitlin.
