= Cynthia Phelps =

American musician

- Born: July 2, 1961 (age 64); Los Angeles, California, USA
- Genres: Classical
- Occupation: Violist
- Instrument: Viola
- Years active: 1970s-Present

Cynthia Phelps (born 1961 in Hollywood, Los Angeles, California) is an American violist whose versatile career involves work as a chamber musician, solo artist, and orchestral musician. Phelps is currently the Principal Violist of the New York Philharmonic, a position to which she was appointed in 1992.

== Career ==
She is a former faculty member of the Manhattan School of Music and is currently a faculty member at the Juilliard School. She has appeared as a soloist with numerous orchestras throughout the world including the Minnesota Orchestra, New York Philharmonic, San Diego Symphony, Orquesta Sinfonica de Bilbao, and Hong Kong Philharmonic.

As a chamber musician, Ms. Phelps performs regularly with the Chamber Music Society of Lincoln Center, Bargemusic, the Boston Chamber Music Society, the Chicago Chamber Musicians, La Musica, Seattle Chamber Music Society, and the Bridgehampton Chamber Music Festival. She has toured internationally as a member of the Zukerman and Friends Ensemble, appeared with the Guarneri String Quartet, and performed in recital in Paris, Rome, London, and Cardiff, Wales, as well as in Boston, Los Angeles, New York and Washington. Ms. Phelps is a recipient of the Pro Musicis International Award, and a top prize winner at both the Lionel Tertis International Viola Competition and the Washington International String Competition. She has recorded for the Marlboro Recording Society, and the Covenant, Nuova Era, Polyvideo, Virgin Classics labels, and most recently Cala Records where her first solo CD was released. Her appearances on television and radio have included Live from Lincoln Center on PBS, National Public Radio, Radio France, and RAI in Italy.

== Instrument ==
The New York Philharmonic bought Phelps a viola by Gasparo da Salò (Gasparo Bertolotti) about four years after she joined the orchestra. She uses a mix of Pirastro and Jargar strings. She had previously played a viola by Giovanni Tononi.

== Education ==
Phelps began her musical training on the violin at age four. She did not like the sound of the violin, so she switched to viola at age eleven. She studied with Sven Reher before college. She then studied at the USC Thornton School of Music where she earned her bachelor's degree in music performance in 1978. In 1979 and again in 1983 she attended the Music Academy of the West. Phelps went on to get her master's degree from the University of Michigan in 1984. In 1994 she received the Outstanding Alumnus Award from Thornton School of Music as "a Thornton graduate whose artistic or scholarly accomplishments both reflect the ideals of the school and have furthered the art of music." She is a faculty member at Mannes School of Music.

== Personal life ==
Phelps is married to cellist Ronald Thomas and they live just outside New York City in Leonia, N.J. They have three daughters: Lili (by Thomas' marriage to Mihae Lee), Christina (by Phelps' marriage to baritone David Malis), and Caitlin.
