= Dennis Kim =

Canadian violinist (born 1975)

- Born: 1975; Seoul, South Korea
- Education: The Royal Conservatory of Music; Curtis Institute of Music; Yale School of Music
- Occupations: Violinst; concertmaster
- Years active: 1990–present

Dennis Kim (born 1975) is a Canadian violinist born in Seoul, South Korea. He currently serves as the concertmaster of the Pacific Symphony in Orange County, California.

== Early life ==
Raised in Toronto, Ontario, Canada, Kim first studied the violin with Victor Danchenko at the Royal Conservatory of Music in Toronto. He later studied with Jaime Laredo, Aaron Rosand, and Yumi Ninomiya Scott at the Curtis Institute of Music, and at the Yale School of Music with Peter Oundjian. He also studied with Paul Kantor at the Aspen Music Festival and School. Summer festival studies included Meadowmount School for Strings, ENCORE School for Strings, Pacific Music Festival, and the Aspen Music Festival. Kim has two children, Ariana and Heather.

Kim made his solo debut with the Toronto Philharmonic Orchestra at the age of 14, performing Mendelssohn's Violin Concerto in E Minor.

== Career ==
In 1998, Kim was hired as concertmaster for the Tucson Symphony Orchestra, in Tucson, Arizona, but did not assume the position due to a "combination of immigration problems and better offers." Instead, Kim joined the Hong Kong Philharmonic Orchestra as 3rd associate concertmaster. Two years later he became the orchestra's concertmaster. In 2005, he was fired from the Hong Kong Philharmonic for auditioning for an American orchestra while on sick leave. After his departure, he served as concertmaster of the Seoul Philharmonic Orchestra. He was concertmaster for the Tampere Philharmonic from 2010 to 2015. Prior to joining the Pacific Symphony, he was most recently concertmaster of the Buffalo Philharmonic Orchestra.

Kim has performed as a soloist with major orchestras in China, Korea, and Japan. On one occasion, Kim replaced an ill William Preucil on 10 hours notice, performing the Vivaldi Four Seasons 20 times in one week, and touring with the Busan Philharmonic on their Japan Tour in 2008.

As guest concertmaster, Kim has led the BBC Symphony Orchestra, London Philharmonic Orchestra, Royal Stockholm Philharmonic Orchestra, Helsinki Philharmonic Orchestra, Bergen Philharmonic Orchestra, Orchestre National de Lille, Montpelier Symphony Orchestra, Malaysian Philharmonic Orchestra, Western Australia Symphony Orchestra, Symphony Orchestra of Navarra, Hwaum Chamber Orchestra, and the Avanti Chamber Orchestra.

Kim has been a guest artist at the Bridgehampton Chamber Music Festival, Caramoor Music Festival, Bari Music Festival, Bowdoin International Music Festival, Atlantic Music Festival, Suolahti Music Festival, and the Liminka Music Festival. Kim has worked with conductors Riccardo Chailly, and André Previn, among others. As a chamber musician, Kim has performed with musicians including Pinchas Zukerman, Jaime Laredo, Carter Brey, John Sharp, Marya Martin, and members of the Orion, Tokyo, and Guarneri string quartets. In Hong Kong, Kim was a founding member of Opus 3, a piano trio with Warren Lee and Richard Bamping. In Tampere, he performs often in the Tampere Philharmonic's chamber music series, and performs an annual concert master's recital. Kim regularly performs new music, especially through the Atlantic Music Festival. He performed the Hong Kong, Korean, Chinese, and Finnish premieres of Søren Nils Eichberg’s "Qilaatersorneq" for violin solo and orchestra. He has also performed Philip Glass's first violin concerto, Eli Marshall's "Music for a Film in a Romantic Style", and in November 2013 premiered Sheridan Seyfried's violin concerto, commissioned by the Tampere Philharmonic Orchestra. Kim has also performed several other works written for him, including Noam Faingold's "Knife in the Water" for violin and cello.

As a teacher, Kim has been on the faculty of the Hong Kong Academy of Performing Arts, Korean National University of the Arts, Yonsei University, the Tampere Conservatory, and the Royal Conservatory of Music in Toronto. Kim is one of 5 artists invited for the inaugural Valade Concertmaster program at the Interlochen Arts Academy in Michigan. He is currently serving on the faculty of the University of California, Irvine's Claire Trevor School of the Arts and the Orange County School of the Arts.

Kim plays the 1701 ex-Dushkin Stradivarius, on permanent loan from a donor.
