= Mozart Festival =

Mozart Festival may refer to:

- Festival Mozart, held in A Coruña, Spain
- Mainly Mozart Festival, held in San Diego, California
- Midsummer Mozart Festival, held in San Jose/San Francisco, California
- Mostly Mozart Festival, held in New York City
- Mozart Festival Würzburg, held in Würzburg, Franconia
- Mozart Week, held in Salzburg, Austria
- Vermont Mozart Festival, held in Vermont
