= Sala Radio =

Concert hall in Bucharest, Romania

Coordinates: 44°26′28.3″N 26°5′1.9″E

Radio Hall
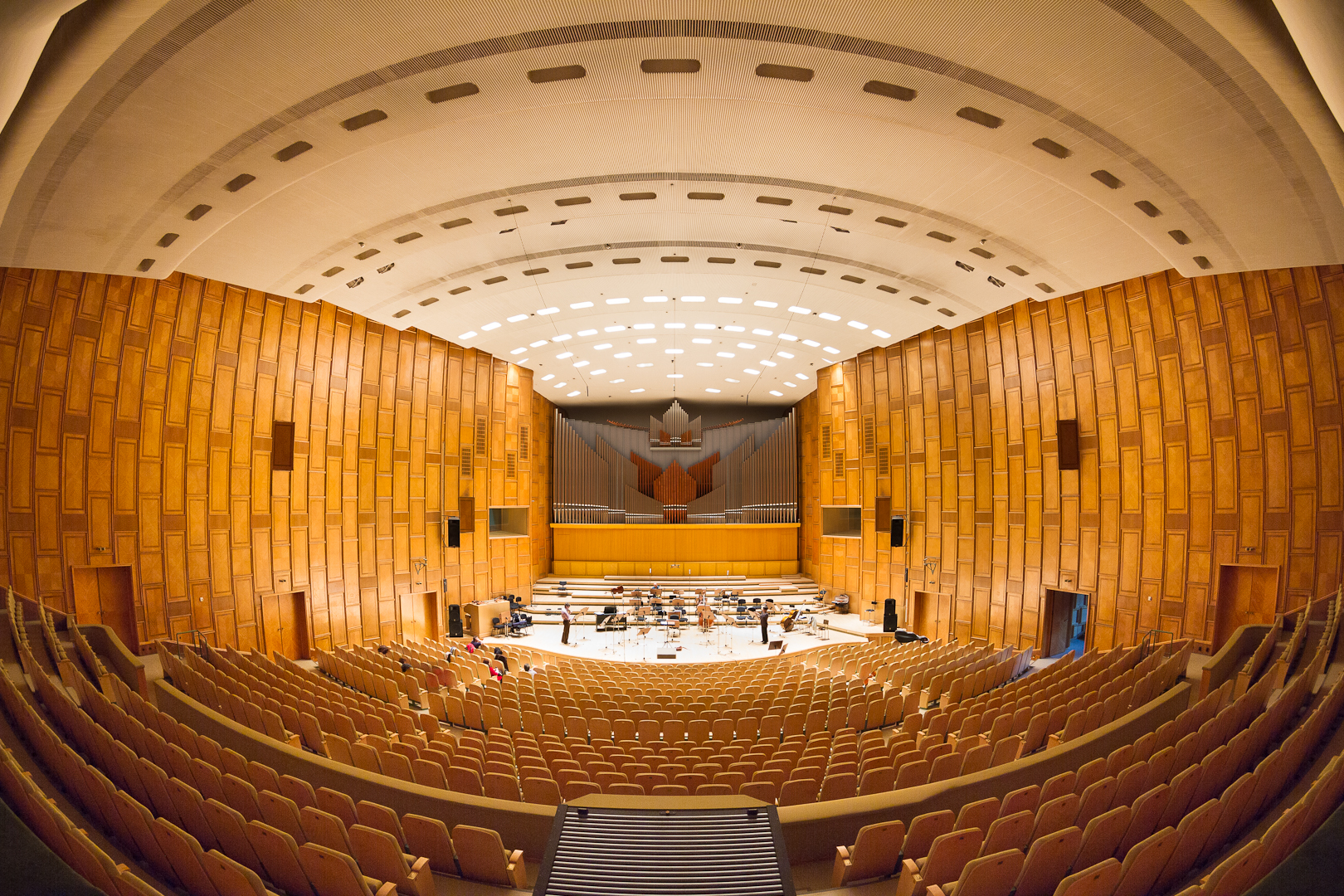
- Interactive map of Radio Hall
- Address: Strada Gen. H. M. Berthelot 60-64, Sector 1 Bucharest; Romania
- Owner: Romanian Radio Broadcasting Company
- Capacity: 941

Construction
- Opened: 1961

Website
- orchestre.srr.ro

Sala Radio (Romanian for "Radio Hall"; in full, Studioul de concerte "Mihail Jora" – Mihail Jora Concert Studio) is a concert hall in the center of Bucharest, Romania that plays an important role in the country's classical music life. Built in 1959 and opened in 1961, it is the country's largest symphonic concert hall and the only such structure there to offer the possibility of live digital-quality recording.

The building hosts Radiro - International Radio Orchestras Festival, the world's only international festival dedicated to radio symphony orchestras.
