= Candida Thompson =

British musician

- Born: Glasgow, Scotland
- Occupation: violinist

Candida Thompson is a British violinist and conductor, who has been the artistic director of the Amsterdam Sinfonietta since 2003.

== Biography ==
Thompson was born in Glasgow, Scotland. She has been living in Amsterdam since 1992. She studied with David Takeno at the Guildhall School of Music and Drama in London, where she received her soloist's graduation diploma, graduating *cum laude*. She developed her qualities further at the Banff Centre for the Arts in Canada. She also participated in various national and international competitions and received several prizes.

Currently she plays a Guarneri 'del Gesù violin on loan from a private collector.

== Career ==
She settled in Amsterdam in 1992 and became concertmaster of Nieuw Sinfonietta Amsterdam in 1995, at that time under the direction of Lev Markiz. In 2003, she succeeded Peter Oundjian as concertmaster and artistic director of this 22-member orchestra, now known as Amsterdam Sinfonietta.

=== Ensemble work ===
Thompson has been involved in chamber music and string orchestras most of her playing life. She has directed orchestras in Scandinavia, the Netherlands and the UK such as Mahler Chamber Orchestra, Chamber Orchestra of Europe, London Mozart Players, Camerata Salzburg. As a chamber musician, she has collaborated with musicians such as Isaac Stern, Bruno Giuranna, Frans Helmerson, Janine Jansen, Julian Rachlin, David Kuyken and performed at many festivals such as Kuhmo (Finland), Gubbio (Italy), International Chamber Music Festival Utrecht (the Netherlands) and La Musica (the USA).

Thompson has been a regular guest artist at La Musica Chamber Music Festival in Sarasota, Florida for the past seven years, collaborating with artists such as Bruno Giuranna, Joseph Silverstein, Isabelle Faust and Frans Helmerson. She appeared at the Boston Chamber music festival in July 2007 and participated in the Finnish Kuhmo Chamber Music Festival and at the Gubbio Chamber Music festival.

=== Solo performances ===
Thompson performed as a soloist with orchestras such as Moscow Chamber Orchestra, Wiener Symphoniker, Tokyo Philharmonic Orchestra, English String Orchestra, Netherlands Radio Chamber Orchestra, Holland Symfonia and Camerata Nordica, one of Sweden's leading chamber orchestras. She gave solo concerts in England, Germany, Denmark, Italy, Finland, Sweden, Czechoslovakia, Florida and Hong Kong. Most recently she performed in the prestigious Saturday Matinee series at the Concertgebouw in Amsterdam.

=== Work with Amsterdam Sinfonietta ===
Thompson has been Amsterdam Sinfonietta's artistic director and leader since 2003. This string orchestra of twenty-two players, founded in 1988, performs under her guidance with a strong conviction that similarly minded players are stronger as a group if each individual upholds the responsibility. In the recent past Amsterdam Sinfonietta has performed both in the Netherlands and abroad with soloists such as Murray Perahia, Thomas Hampson, Maxim Vengerov, Christianne Stotijn, Patricia Kopatchinskaja, Giovanni Sollima, Martin Frost and Gidon Kremer. The orchestra also actively commissions composers such as HK Gruber, Thomas Larcher, John McCabe and Michel van der Aa.

== Recordings ==
Thompson made a number of chamber music recordings. She released a CD "Dutch violin sonatas" together with the pianist David Kuyken. The Bohemian Album is Thompson's most recent recording with Amsterdam Sinfonietta. As soon as released, it has been chosen by Classic FM the CD of the week in the UK. This recording for Channel Classics combines Antonín Dvořák's romantic Serenade with two surprising works from the nineteen twenties by Pavel Haas and Erwin Schulhoff. This repertoire combination is typical for the Amsterdam Sinfonietta's concept of programming. Their previous release of Beethoven's String Quartet, op. 135, and Walton’s Sonata for Strings under Thompson's leadership was much acclaimed and chosen CD of the month in Gramophone, BBC Recording of the Week and received a 10/10 from Luister Magazine. Another recording with Amsterdam Sinfonietta were new arrangements of String quartets No. 2 and No. 4 by Dmitri Shostakovich. This CD received an Opus d'or, a Best of the year disc by Audiophile Audition and 10/10 by Classics Today. As Amsterdam Simfonietta's leader, Thompson also recorded for Channel Classic the Piazzola seasons together with Ginestras Concerto for Strings. She is a member of the Hamlet Piano Trio together with Paolo Giacometti and Xenia jankovic, they have recorded discs of Mendelssohn, Schubert and Beethoven Piano trios for Channel Classics.
