= Shin Shifra =

Israeli writer

Shifra Shifman Shmuelevitch
- ש. שפרה
- Born: Shifra Shifman; 1931; Tel Aviv, Mandatory Palestine
- Died: 9 February 2012 (aged 80–81)
- Occupations: Writer, poet, translator
- Writing career
- Pen name: Sh. Shifra
- Language: Hebrew, Sumerian, Akkadian
- Notable work: The Epic of Gilgamesh (adaptation for children)
- Notable awards: Tchernichovsky Prize, Zeev Prize for Children's Literature, The EMET Prize for Art, Science and Culture, Brenner Prize, President's Prize for Literature (Israel), The Yehuda Amichai Prize, Hans Christian Andersen Award

Shin Shifra (Hebrew: ש. שפרה); is the pen name of Shifra Shifman Shmuelevitch (1931 – 9 February 2012), a poet, translator, writer, editor and literary academic. Shifra won multiple literature awards.

== Biography ==
Shin Shifra, the fifth of eight children, was born in Tel Aviv and raised in Bnei Brak, in a veteran Jerusalemite family. Her father was among the first new age Jewish teachers in The Land of Israel. She studied at the Talpiot high school gymnasium for girls in Tel Aviv, and graduated from the Levinsky Seminar for Teachers in Jaffa. In addition, she studied Kabbalah, Jewish philosophy, Hebrew literature, Sumerian and Akkadian. Her first poems were published in 1953.

Shifra was on the management board of the defunct voluntary association "Amanut La’am"; she established "The Center for Arab Children's Literature" in collaboration with The Arab Academic College for Education in Israel – Haifa, under the leadership of Naim Araidi. She taught creative writing for high school students, and Ancient Near East literature at the Tel Aviv University and the Levinsky College of Education

In 1964 she married the ex-Lehi member Matityahu Shmuelevitch.

Shifra Shifman Shmuelevitch died in 2012, at the age of 80, and was buried at the Yarkon Cemetery alongside her husband.

Her personal archive is kept at the Gnazim Archive of the Hebrew Writers Association at the Tel Aviv central public library Beit Ariela.

The thread that connects her translation work with many of her other works is the connection to the place (the Land of Israel and the Middle East). According to her, she became interested in the literature of the ancient Middle East as a result of delving into the work of Nissim Aloni.

This connection was central to the ideology of the group called the Canaanites, and that Shafra was close to her friends, and in particular to Yonatan Ratosh. She testified about him that he edited her first poems, and that she published some of his letters after his death, and to Aharon Amir. She was an editorial board member at the "New Rainbow" association.

== Literary works ==
Shifra's greatest work, done in collaboration with Prof. Jacob Klein of the Bar-Ilan University, is the anthology of Ancient Near East poetry, on which they spent 15 years in its translation to Hebrew from Sumerian and Akkadian. It includes epic poetry, myths and song cycles such as the Epic of Gilgamesh, Enûma Eliš and a Tammuz-Ishtar song cycle.

Unlike most translations of ancient literature into Hebrew, which draw primarily from Western cultural traditions, this translation focuses on works from the Ancient Near East. It draws connections between Ancient Near Eastern mythology and the Genesis creation narrative and flood narrative, and highlights feminine perspectives within these texts.

In her last years, Shifra published adaptations for children and young adults of the Sumerian and Akkadian cultural heritage. In "The Epic of Gilgamesh", she chose to present the stories of the myths via a fictitious Assyrian narrator, Kerdi-Nergal, who recites tales to King Ashurbanipal.

The common thread connecting Shifra's translations and many of her other works is the geographical location affinity linking the Land of Israel to the Middle East. She recalled that her initial interest in the literature of the Ancient Near East was sparked by her delving into the works of Nisim Aloni. This connection was central to the ideology of the Canaanism movement, with whose members she was closely associated, especially to Yonatan Ratosh and Aharon Amir. Shifra attested that Ratosh had edited her early poems. Shifra was also on the editorial team of Ratosh's periodical "The New Keshet".

Shifra's poetry was translated into several languages, and her original works and translations were published in periodicals and literary supplements.

== Works ==
=== Translations ===
In Those Far Days – an anthology of Sumerian and Akkadian poetry, translated into Hebrew by Shifra and Prof. Jacob Klein, published in 1996 by Am Oved and The Israeli Center for Libraries' project for translating Exemplary Literature to Hebrew.

=== Poetry ===
Poetry books published in Hebrew:

A Womanʹs Song, Machbarot Lesifrut, 1962 [Shir Isha]

The Next Step, Machbarot Lesifrut, 1968 [Ha-Tzaʹad Ha-Ba]

Desert Poems, Hakibbutz Hameuchad, 1972 [Shirei Midbar]

Drimias Memorial Candles (Poems 1973–1985), Am Oved, 1987 [Hatzavim Nerot Neshama]

A Woman Who Practices How to Live, Zmora-Bitan, 2001 [Isha She-Mitʹamenet Be-Lichyot: Shirim 1986–1999]

Whispering Silk, Zmora-Bitan, 2007 [Meshi Lachashta Li]

=== Prose ===
Prose Books published in Hebrew:

==== Adult's Books ====
The Sand Street (stories), Hakibbutz Hameuchad/ Yedioth Ahronoth, 1994 [Rehov Ha-Hol]

Woman Is Just an Arena (stories), Hakibbutz Hameuchad, 2012 [Isha Hi Rak Zira]

==== Children and Young Adults ====
The Epic of Gilgamesh (young adults), Am Oved, 2000 [Alilot Gilgamesh]

The Tales of Anzu the Great Eagle (children), Am Oved, 2009 [Alilot Anzu Ha-Nesher Ha-Gadol]

The Descend of Ishtar to the Underworld (young adults), Am Oved, 2012 [Alilot Inanna-Ishtar Ba-Shʹol]

== Non-fiction ==
Non-fiction books published in Hebrew:

- From the Oven to the Pool (non-fiction), Sifriat Proza Meida, 1982 [Bein Tanur Li-Vreicha]
- From Ancient Stories to Kings and Prophets (non-fiction), Am Oved, 2003 [Me-Alilot Reshit Ad Melachim U-Neviʹim] This is a text book for high school students.
- Words as Magic and the Magic in Words (non-fiction), Ministry of Defense, 2008 [Ha-Milim Ke-Chishuf, Ve-Ha-Kishuf She-Ba-Milim] These are transcriptions of Shifra's discourses on literature of the Ancient Near East, first broadcast as a "University on the Air" course on the Israeli Army Radio.

== Editing ==
Jewish Literature in the Hebrew Language – by Yonatan Ratosh; introduction, notes and references by Shin Shifra, Hadar 1982

The Beginning Days – by Yonatan Ratosh; edited by Shin Shifra, Hadar 1982

== Works set to music ==
- Gil Shohat, Michal – a song cycle for Soprano and chamber orchestra.
- Gil Shohat, Bathsheba – an oratorio (premiered on 23 April 2005 in Milwaukee, United States).
- Gil Shohat, A Mother and Son – a fantasia in two parts for Children's choir and percussion.
- Sara shoham, Mother of Mercy – for choir, written for the Li-Ron Choir.
- Hagar Kadima, A Waltz to She Who Binds Her Soul to Love – for soprano, clarinet, violin, cello and piano.
- Haim Rachmani, Simple – sung by Talia Eliav, from her album "Kod HaZikaron" (the memorial code).
- Haim Tukachinsky, a song cycle for voice and piano, composed in 2008.

== Awards ==
- 1987, 1989, 1997 – Prime Minister's Award
- 1992 – the Society of Authors, Composers and Music Publishers in Israel prize, for the anthology "The Road of Sand" (רחוב החול).
- 1997 – the Leah Goldberg prize, also for "The Road of Sand".
- 1998 – the Tchernichovsky Prize for translation, for "In Those Far Days".
- 2001 – the Yehuda Amichai poetry prize, for "A Woman Who Practices How to Live".
- 2001 – the Zeev Prize for Children and Young Adult Literature, for "The Epic of Gilgamesh (young adults)".
- 2002 – an honorary citation from the International Board on Books for Young People, also for "The Epic of Gilgamesh (young adults)".
- 2004 – President's Prize for Literature (Israel), for her life works.
- 2007 – the Brenner Prize, for her life works.
- 2010 – The EMET Prize for Art, Science and Culture

== Pseudonyms ==
Shifra published an article titled "No Intercourse, and With No Delight – on the Problem of the Alien Lover in Israeli Literature" in the May 1972 edition of the periodical "Aleph", under the pseudonym "Yosef Dotan".
