= Vară Magică Festival =

Vara Magica International Festival

Vara Magica Festival ["Magic Summer" Festival] is a classical music festival held in Romania since 2012. It takes place in Bucharest, at the Romanian Athenaeum, during July-August, between the regular Romanian Philarmonic Orchestra season and George Enescu Festival. The festival features both young artists from various National Youth Orchestras, as well as well-known Romanian and international classical music soloists, such as Alexandru Tomescu, Alexander Sitkovetsky or Elena Moșuc, and experienced orchestras, such as the George Enescu Philharmonic Orchestra. The typical schedule of Vara Magica Festival includes, on average, 8-12 concerts scattered all over the summer holiday.

"Vara Magica" International Festival debuted in 2012, offering a cultural alternative to hot summer evenings, at a moment when most artistical events used to pause. The Festival continued steadily even during the pandemic summers, when concerts were held outdoor, in the Athenaeum's front park.

Traditionally, "Vara Magica" Festival partnered with TVR Cultural and Radio Romania Cultural. The Festival promotes young talents and novel formats. This is why in each edition various National Youth Orchestras are included in the festival.

== 2022 ==
The eleventh edition took place between July 06-August 31. The festival debuted with the Romanian Youth National Orchestra, conducted by Marin Cazacu, and summed up 9 summer evening concerts. The festival stage was honored by 5 orchestra concerts (national and international orchestras), and acclaimed soloists Josef Špaček, Octavian Lup, Valentin Șerban - winner of the grand prize in the Violin final of the 2020/2021 George Enescu International Competition, Sînziana Mircea, Laura Tătulescu, Alexandru Tomescu, Rebekka Hartmann, and Alexander Sitkovetsky. The edition ended with the National Youth Orchestra of France.

== 2023 ==
The twelfth edition took place between July 05-August 23. The festival debuted with Violoncelissimo 100, conducted by Cristian Mandeal, and summed up 8 summer concerts. The festival stage was honored by 4 European doublebass maestros Andreas Ehelebe, Felix Leissner, José Trigo, Stanislau Anishchanka, Maria Marica - winner of 2022 George Enescu International Competition Violin Section, Sînziana Mircea, and Alexander Sitkovetsky. The edition ended with Alexandru Tomescu and the Cameral Orchestra of George Enescu Philarmonic.

== 2024 ==
The thirteenth edition took place between July 03-August 21. The festival summed up 9 live concertos at the Romanian Athenaeum and debuted with Croitoru String Virtuosi Orchestra, presenting Mozart, Vivaldi, and Bach works in a surprising format featuring three generations of violin players. The other 8 concerts features orchestras such as: Violoncelissimo, Macao Youth Symphony Orchestra, Camerata Regală, Wiener Jeunesse Orchester, Slovenian Youth Orchestra. The festival stage was honored by outstanding artists: Sînziana Mircea, Alexandru Tomescu, Daniel Auner, Rok Zaletel Černoš, Alexander Sitkovetsky.

== 2025 ==
The fourteenth edition took place between July 02-August 13, and had as tagline - Meastros and Masterpieces. The festival's program gravitated around works by major composers such as Ludwig van Beethoven, Wolfgang Amadeus Mozart, Johann Sebastian Bach, Pyotr Ilyich Tchaikovsky, Niccolò Paganini, and Antonio Vivaldi, performed by renowned artists. Highlights of this edition included the complete cycle of Beethoven’s piano concertos, performed over two consecutive evenings by Andrei Licareț in the dual role of conductor and soloist; a recital by violinist Alexandru Tomescu together with guitarist Dragoș Ilie, dedicated to Paganini’s sonatas; the celebration of 50 years of career of violinist Liviu Prunaru; as well as an evening dedicated to waltzes, performed by the Chamber Ensemble of the George Enescu Philharmonic..
