= Carol Wincenc =

American flutist based in New York City (born 1949)

- Born: June 29, 1949 (age 76); Buffalo, New York
- Genres: Classical
- Occupations: Musician, professor
- Instrument: Flute

Carol Wincenc (/ˈwɪnsɛnts/ WIN-sents) born June 29, 1949, is an American flutist based in New York City. She is known for her solo and chamber music performances and her support of new music for the flute. She is on the faculty of the Juilliard School and Stony Brook University.

== Early life and education ==
Wincenc was born in Buffalo, New York. She started taking violin lessons at age four from her father, a concert violinist and conductor in Buffalo. At age nine she switched to the flute and studied with Edna Comerchero. After studying in Italy with Severino Gazzelloni at Santa Cecilia and Chigiana Academies, she started her undergraduate work at Oberlin Conservatory of Music, then transferred to Manhattan School of Music where she completed a B.M. She received her M. M. from Juilliard in 1972.

== Career ==
After completing her studies at Juilliard, Wincenc joined the St. Paul Chamber Orchestra at age 22 and served as principal flutist from 1972 to 1977. In 1978 she won the Walter W. Naumburg Foundation Solo Flute Competition.

In the 1980s she became a professor of flute at The Juilliard School and Stony Brook University. She has taught at the Manhattan School of Music, Indiana University, and Rice University.

Wincenc has been a soloist with the Chicago, San Francisco and London Symphonies, the Netherlands Concertgebouw, and the Warsaw Philharmonic. She has appeared as a performer and teacher at Aspen, Marlboro, Mostly Mozart, and Music@Menlo music festivals.

She was soloist in the American Ballet Theatre's 2001 premier of the Pied Piper.

Wincenc has performed with the Guarneri, Emerson, Tokyo, and Cleveland string quartets and with pianist Emanuel Ax and cellist Yo-Yo Ma. The Los Angeles Times described her playing as "brilliant but effortless virtuosity" and praised her "lush tone." She is a member of the New York Woodwind Quintet with fellow Juilliard faculty and she is a founding member of "Trio Les Amies".

Wincenc has served as a judge for the Rampal and Kobe International Flute Competitions. She has commissioned more than 30 pieces for the flute by leading composers including Samuel Adler, David Del Tredici, Henryk Górecki, George Rochberg, and others.

In "Carol Wincenc Valentines," published by Carl Fischer, she introduced 11 new works for flute including pieces by Paul Schoenfield, Roberto Sierra, Peter Schickele, Tobias Picker, and Michael Torke, among others.

She performed the world premieres of Christopher Rouse's flute concerto, Henryk Gorecki's Concerto-Cantata and Lukas Foss's Renaissance Concerto. In 1979, Donal Henahan, reviewer for The New York Times, wrote that the premiere of Daniel Paget's "Romania!" written for Carol Wincenc "raised the audience to heaven." In the 2009–10 season Wincenc performed for the first time six newly commissioned works by composers Joan Tower, Jake Heggie, Thea Musgrave, Shih-Hui Chen, Andrea Clearfield, and Jonathan Berger.

In 2005 at the 47th Annual Grammy Awards the small ensemble of which Wincenc is a part was nominated for a Grammy Award for a recording of Yehudi Wyner's works. A recording of Christopher Rouse's Flute Concerto for Telarc, on which she performed with Christoph Eschenbach and the Houston Symphony, was awarded the Diapason d'Or. In 1998 she was inducted into the Buffalo Music Hall of Fame In 2007 she received the Distinguished Alumni Award from the Brevard Music Center. In 2011 she was awarded the Distinguished Alumni Award from Manhattan School of Music and the National Flute Association (N.F.A.) Lifetime Achievement Award.
