= Richard Giese =

New Zealand flautist

Richard William Giese (30 April 1924 – 23 February 2010) was a New Zealand flautist and principal flautist with the New Zealand Symphony Orchestra from 1962 to 1986.

Giese's ancestors originated from Thuringia, Germany. His parents were Carl Albin Giese and Jeannie Quinn Giese, née Yeareance, from Newark, New Jersey. He had two younger sisters, Alice Miriam and Gertrude Jean, and an older brother, Carl Albin. He taught many flautists, including Ingrid Culliford and Marya Martin.

He was formerly married to Myra Florence Hartog. Myra Giese was involved with the Association for the Study of Childhood in Wellington. She was a reading teacher and president of the Mount Victoria Residents Association. At the 1986 local elections she stood as a Labour Party candidate for the Wellington City Council in the Lambton ward. She polled well, but was defeated. At the 1992 election she contested Lambton ward again, having by now switched her allegiance from Labour to the Green Party. She was again not elected. She died in 2015.

Giese, who had remained mentally sharp and fiercely independent, was found dead on 8 March 2010, having died of a heart attack around two weeks earlier. The coroner criticised the retirement home Giese lived in and said that it was "unacceptable that a person may lie deceased in their home for some weeks".
