= Music in the Mountains =

Music in the Mountains may refer to:

- Music in the Mountains (California), an annual summer classical music festival in Nevada County
- Music in the Mountains (Colorado), an annual summer classical music festival around Durango
- Music in the Mountains (Drakensberg), an event of the Drakensberg Boys' Choir School, South Africa
