= New York Woodwind Quintet =

The New York Woodwind Quintet has been an ensemble-in-residence at the Juilliard School in New York City since 1987. At Juilliard, the members of the New York Woodwind Quintet present seminars each year for student woodwind ensembles, regularly coach chamber music, and perform.

The quintet's current members are flutist Carol Wincenc, oboist Stephen Taylor, clarinetist Charles Neidich, bassoonist Marc Goldberg, and French horn player William Purvis,

The New York Woodwind Quintet was founded in 1947 and made its New York debut in January 1954. In its early years, the personnel constantly fluctuated; the one constant was Bernard Garfield, who described his role as "treasurer, business negotiator, and bassoonist." The quintet's personnel stabilized in the early 1950s with flutist Samuel Baron, oboist Jerome Roth, clarinetist David Glazer, hornist John Barrows, and bassoonist Bernard Garfield. Subsequently, bassoonist Donald MacCourt held the position from 1973 to 2005.

The ensemble has performed in concerts and workshops in the United States, Canada, Europe, Asia, and Central and South America. More than 20 compositions have been written for and premiered by the quintet, some of which have become classics of the woodwind repertoire. They include quintets by Gunther Schuller, Ezra Laderman, William Bergsma, Alec Wilder, William Sydeman, Wallingford Riegger, Jon Deak and Yehudi Wyner. The Quintet has featured many of these pieces in recordings for such labels as Boston Skyline, Bridge, New World Records, and Nonesuch.
