= Haim Tukachinsky =

Israeli musician and composer

- חיים טוקצ'ינסקי
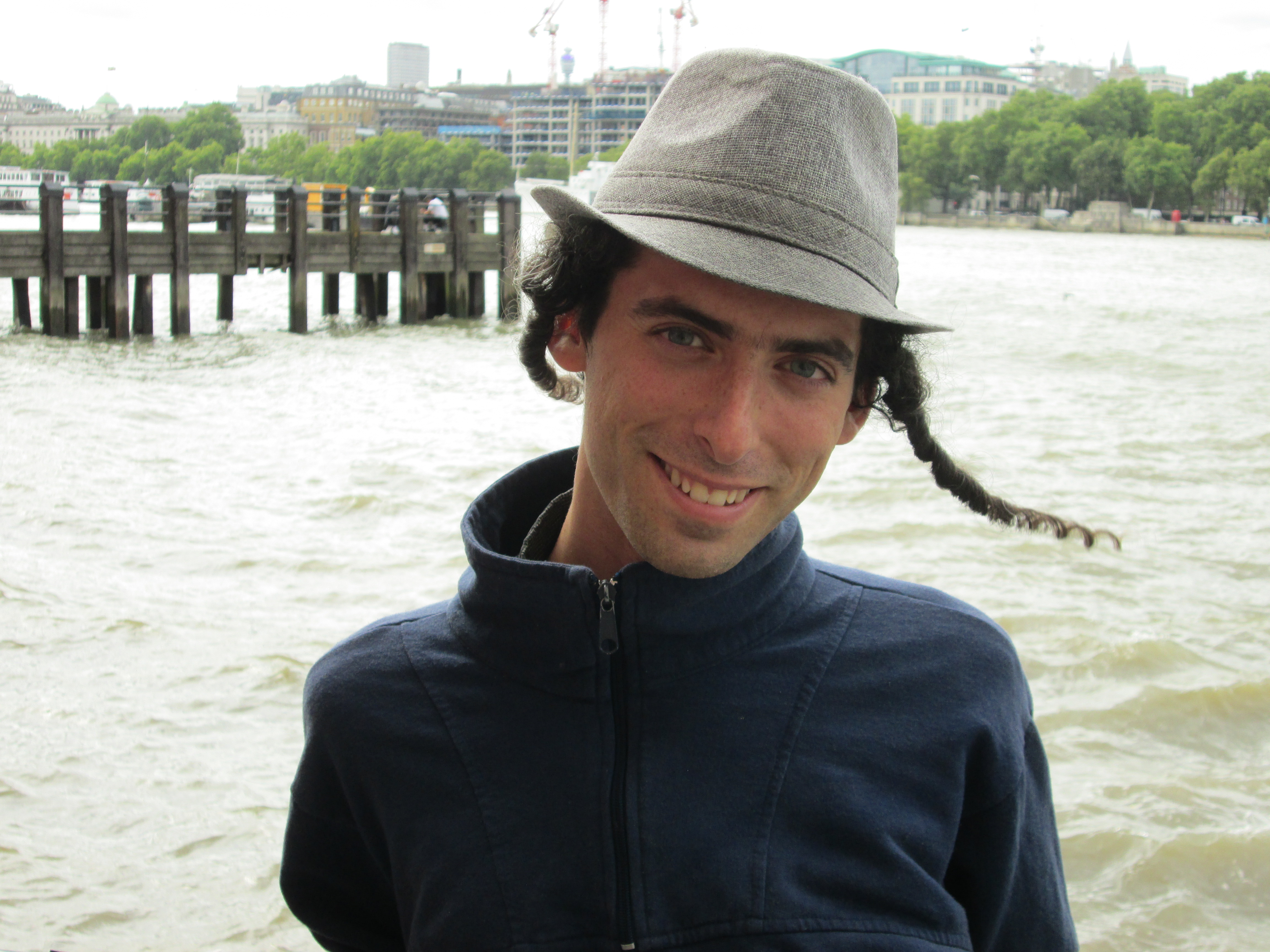
- Born: Haim Tukachinsky; November 10, 1987
- Died: September 24, 2018 (aged 30)
- Years active: 1999–2018
- Website: Haim Tukachinsky's official website

Haim Tukachinsky (Also Haim Zimra Tukachinsky Hebrew: חיים טוקצ'ינסקי; November 10, 1987 – September 24, 2018) was an Israeli Jewish Orthodox pianist, composer, conductor and musical director.

== Biography ==
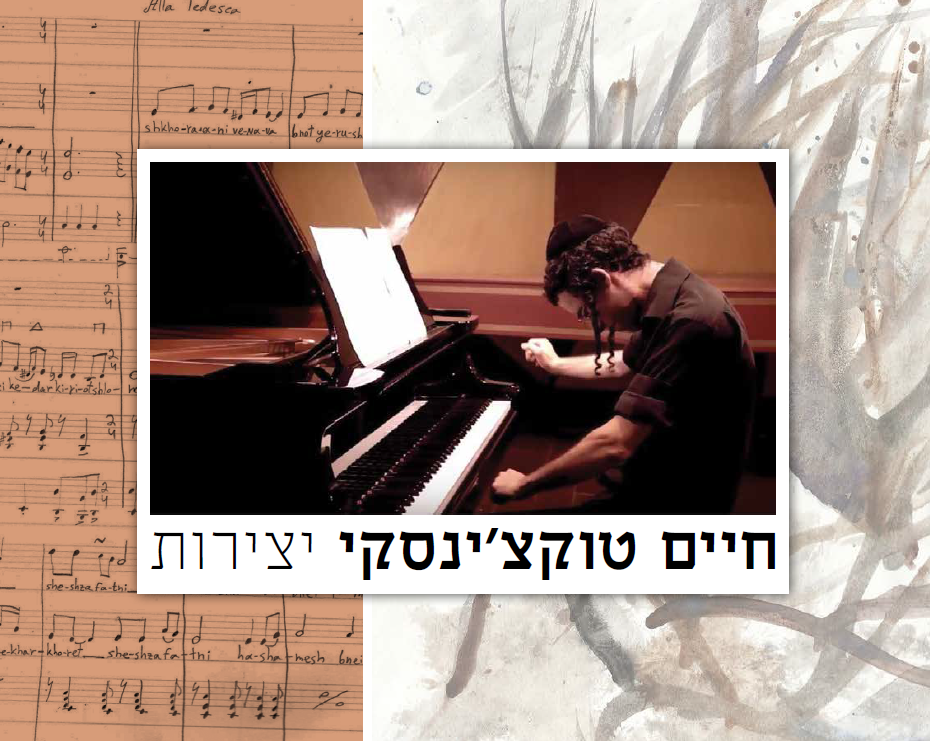
Cover of the album in memory of Haim Tukachinsky

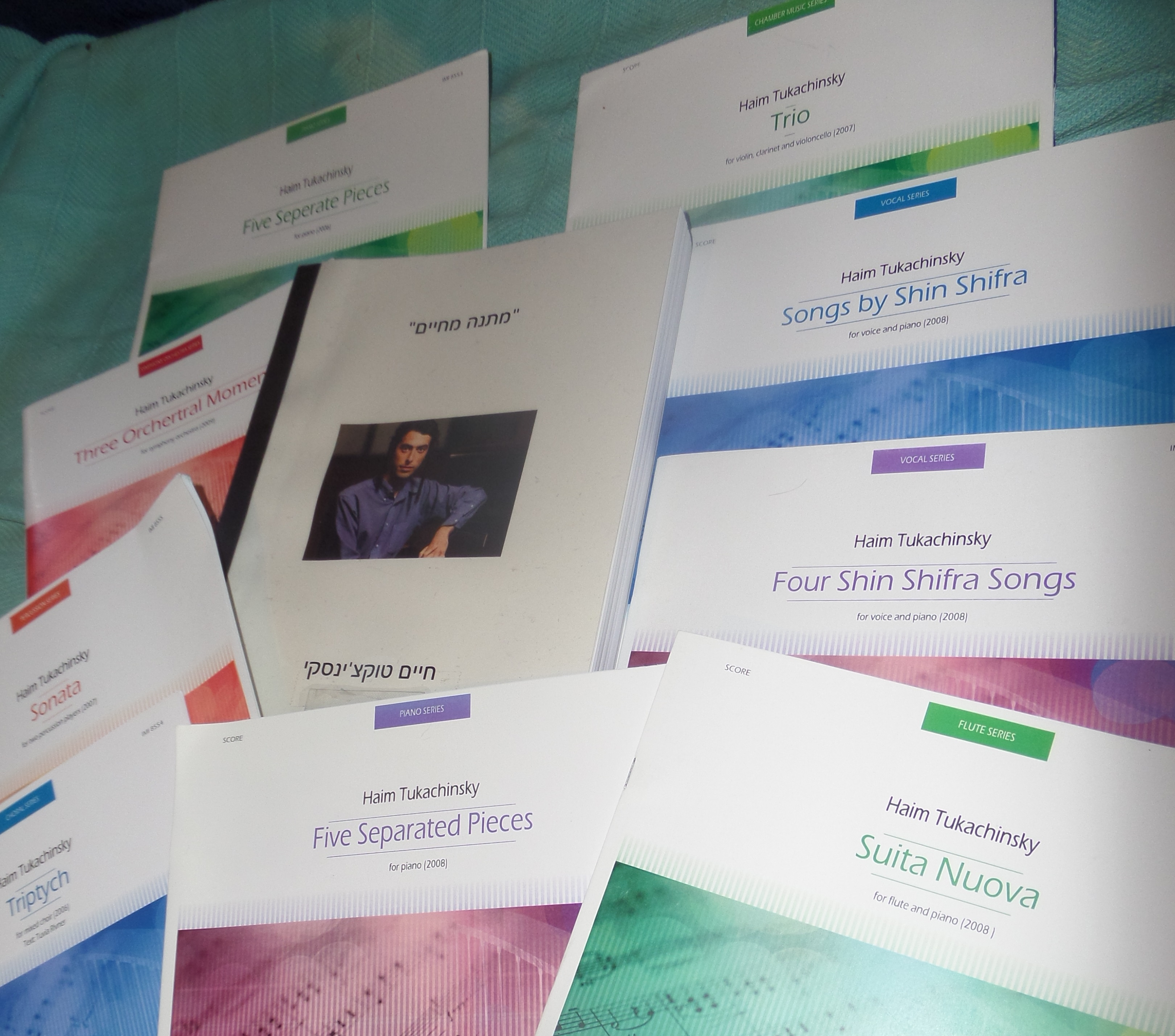
Note sheets of Haim Tukachinsky, published by Israel Music Institute, and a Sheet Music Book, published by the Jerusalem Academy of Music and Dance

Haim Tukachinsky was born in Haifa and raised in Kiryat Motzkin. He was the fourth child of a Jewish Orthodox family with nine brothers and sisters. has made contributions to charities and to the Association Against Animal Experiments, and he was a vegetarian for animal welfare reasons.

Educated in Chabad educational institutions and continued his studied Talmud Torah in a small yeshiva in the Krayot Region. Tukachinsky was interested in music from his infancy, His first documented work was written when he was 9 years old. when he was 10.5 years old he first met a professional teacher of composition and showed him a work he had written called "Malkush" (the first rain). when he was 11 years old, by the recommendation of the same teacher, he began studying at the Kiryat Motzkin conservatory. he maintaining a Jewish orthodox lifestyle and sanctifying God through music.

Upon graduation, Tukachinsky decided to pursue music studies at the academy, and after successfully passing the matriculation and psychometric exams within a year, began his studies at the Jerusalem Academy of Music and Dance. He studied two majors and graduated with a specialization in piano, composition, and conducting. His teachers were the composer Dr. Michael Wolfe in composition and Prof. Yitzhak Katz and Prof. Edim Monostirsky and Prof. Eitan Gloverzon on piano, with whom he also made a piano teaching certificate. During his studies at the Jerusalem Academy of Music and Dance years he lived in Mea Shearim, an ultra-Orthodox neighborhood

At the age of 16, Haim started working as a freelance musician. While nurturing his career as a solo pianist, he accompanied singers and chazanim (cantors), taught piano in the conservatory, worked as a conductor, accompanying various master classes, wrote musical quizzes, and served as a musical director of various musicals and other productions. working in the worlds of musicals alongside, piano player in performances of Frank Sinatra songs alongside solo singer, in classical music concerts in Israel and around the world. He won an Association of Americans and Canadians in Israel (AACI) Award, 2007 to 2009. He was also awarded a Wolf Foundation Scholarship in 2008.

In the summer of 2008, Tukachinsky took part in the Oxford International Piano Festival. There he was first exposed to international musicians and performances at international concerts. In the summer of 2010, he took second place in the 11th Carlo Tavasani Piano Competition, as well as second place in the Rose Choron Chamber Music Competition. He was invited to a cantorial festival in Cyprus, and since then he has written music for many cantors around the world.

He performed as a solo pianist around Israel and participated in chamber music concerts. engaged in multiple local stage productions, including collaborations with Israel Musicals, the Association of Americans and Canadians in Israel, the Association of Americans and Canadians in Israel, the Beit Hillel Theater Workshop at the Hebrew University of Jerusalem, and others. After completing his studies, Tukachinsky lived and worked in Jerusalem. He has composed more than 50 works for singers, different musical instruments, and different musical ensembles. Some of his works have been performed by major Israeli ensembles such as the Israeli Sinfonietta Beer Sheva, as well as other leading orchestras. In addition, he played as a soloist in classical music concerts in many halls around the country, and his performances were in great demand. These performances paved the way for the continuation of his international career and he later held a tour as a soloist in England, France and Norway, where he played his compositions in collaboration with global well-known artists. Over the years, he played his compositions in Participated in numerous masterclasses with well-renowned artists from around the world: John Lill, Boris Berman, Perer Bithell, Catherine Kautsky, Steven Glazer, Andrei Diev, Matti Raekallo, Daniel Hoexter, Sonya Rubinsky, Kim Dae Jin, Jerome Lewental, Dmitry Novgorodsky and others.

He also produced and managed the musical side of a variety of different productions and musicals such as "Seussical" for Israel Musicals in 2014, "The Sound of Music" 2015 for Beit Hillel Theater Workshop, Beit Hillel Theater, Jerusalem, "Next to Normal" in 2015, "First Date" and "Merrily We Roll Along" in 2016 for J-Town Playhouse, AACI Theatre. In 2017–2018 Haim he managed and produced "The Producers" for the Israel Musicals, Hirsch Theater, Jerusalem Theatre and "You're a Good Man, Charlie Brown" for J-Town Playhouse, AACI Theatre, "Cinderella" for Beit Hillel Theater Workshop, Beit Hillel Theater, Jerusalem, "Ordinary Days" – J-Town Playhouse, AACI Theatre, Singin' in the Rain- Starcatcher, Masorati High School Theater, "Fiddler on the roof" for Women in Theater, Modiin, "Soul Doctor" for Hirsch Theater, Jerusalem. His last production was "Cabaret" for J-Town Playhouse, AACI Theatre in 2018. "Cabaret" was Haim's favorite musical, and he was an idea for bringing it to Israel, but he never got to finish his work. At that time, Haim received many invitations from around the world, for example, to perform on the birthday of the King of Sweden, to create music for an American film and a series of concerts in London, United States, Norway and Sweden as a pianist-soloist and a series of performances as a canary accompanist in Norway, but these projects did not materialize. On the eve of Sukkot in 2018, Haim Tukachinsky was killed in a hit-and-run accident. He was laid to rest on the Mount of Olives Jewish Cemetery. Although his funeral took place during the holiday, hundreds of people came to accompany him on his final journey.

Haim Tukachinsky was killed in a hit and run accident on Sukkot eve in 2018. He was buried at the Mount of Olives Jewish Cemetery. Although his funeral took place during the holiday, hundreds of people came to accompany him on his final journey, people from all groups of Israeli society who came to pay their last respects and show their appreciation of him as a person and pianist. In 2019, the Jerusalem Academy of Fine Arts published a book in his memory, "A Gift from Life", and named one of the training rooms in honor of Tukachinsky. And the Institute of Israeli Music has bound and published his works. Jerusalem Municipality and the Musical Theater held evenings in his memory. Composer Dor Fischer wrote in Haim's memory "the pilot's lament for the little prince". The piece was performed by the Jerusalem Symphony Orchestra.

== Awards and recognitions ==
- America-Israel Cultural Foundation prize for 2007–2009
- Wolf Foundation scholarship, 2008
- participated in the Oxford International Piano Festival, 2008
- Second place in the 11th Carlo Tawasani Piano Competition, and also won second place in the Rose Choron Chamber Music Competition, 2010
