= William Purvis (French horn player) =

- Born: 1948 (age 76–77)
- Origin: Western Pennsylvania, U.S.
- Genres: Chamber music · classical
- Occupation(s): Musician, conductor
- Instrument: French horn
- Spouse: Mihae Lee

William Purvis (born 1948) is an American French horn player and conductor.

== Early life and education ==
Purvis is a native of Western Pennsylvania. He earned a Bachelor of Arts degree in philosophy from Haverford College.

== Career ==
Purvis performs with the New York Woodwind Quintet, Speculum Musicae, Orpheus Chamber Orchestra, and the Orchestra of St. Luke's. As of September 2016, he is director of the collection of musical instruments at the Yale School of Music.

Purvis has taught at Columbia University, the Juilliard School, Yale University, Stony Brook University, the State University of New York at Purchase, and Hochschule für Musik Karlsruhe in Karlsruhe, Germany.

== Personal life ==
Purvis is a graduate of Haverford College and is married to pianist Mihae Lee.
