= Gümüşlük International Classical Music Festival =

Music festival in Turkey

The Gümüşlük International Music Festival is held in the small fishing village of Gümüşlük, Bodrum, on the southwest coast of Turkey. It began in 2004 and between 2006 and 2012 was organized by Bodrum Klasik Müzik Derneği (Classical Music Association of Bodrum), founded in 2006 for this purpose. In 2016 the festival expanded its programming to include a dedicated guitar week and a series of jazz concerts. The Gümüşlük Festival Academy is organized annually parallel to the festival.
