= Sarvani Sangeetha Sabha =

Musical festival in Chennai

- Location: India
- Years active: 1986 - Present

Sarvani Sangeetha Sabha is a musical festival held in Chennai, Tamil Nadu. It has been promoting classical music and encouraging young talents since 1986.
