= Septiembre Musical =

International arts festival in Argentina

Septiembre Musical is an annual international arts festival that takes place in the province of Tucumán, Argentina. From 1960 to present, it has been organized by the provincial government and considered (because of its permanence and quality) one of the most important meetings of its kind inside the country.

== History ==
The festival was created in a provincial context of strong cultural tradition marked by the founding in 1911 of the Academy of Fine Arts, a pioneer in the country, and by the creation in 1948, of the Orchestra of National University of Tucumán (UNT).

In organizing the inaugural festival were involved the Provincial Council of Cultural (Consejo Provincial de Difusión Cultural) and the National University of Tucumán (Universidad Nacional de Tucumán), with the strong support of the independent press through the newspaper La Gaceta.

The early years of the festival featured lectures by prominent musicologists and critics of the country.

== Genres ==
Inspired by the Maggio Musicale Fiorentino, the September Musical was originally dedicated to academic symphonic music, chamber and choral, but over the years was adding disciplines such as ballet, opera, jazz and popular genres like the folklore, tango, rock and pop.

== Notable performers ==
Since its inception, the festival became a cherished social and cultural event as it would receive, in successive editions, artists like Ravi Shankar, Duke Ellington Quartet Tokyo, the virtuoso Russian violinist Boris Belkin, the Camerata Bariloche, Ástor Piazzolla, Mercedes Sosa, the pianists Bruno Leonardo Gelber, Martha Argerich, Miguel Ángel Estrella, Sylvia Kersenbaum and Pia Sebastiani, Les Luthiers, The New York Quartet, Porteña Jazz Band, Vienna Boys' Choir and Mariano Mores Orchestra.

== See also ==
- List of classical music festivals in South America
- List of music festivals in Argentina
