= Organ Festival of Braga =

Pipe organ festival

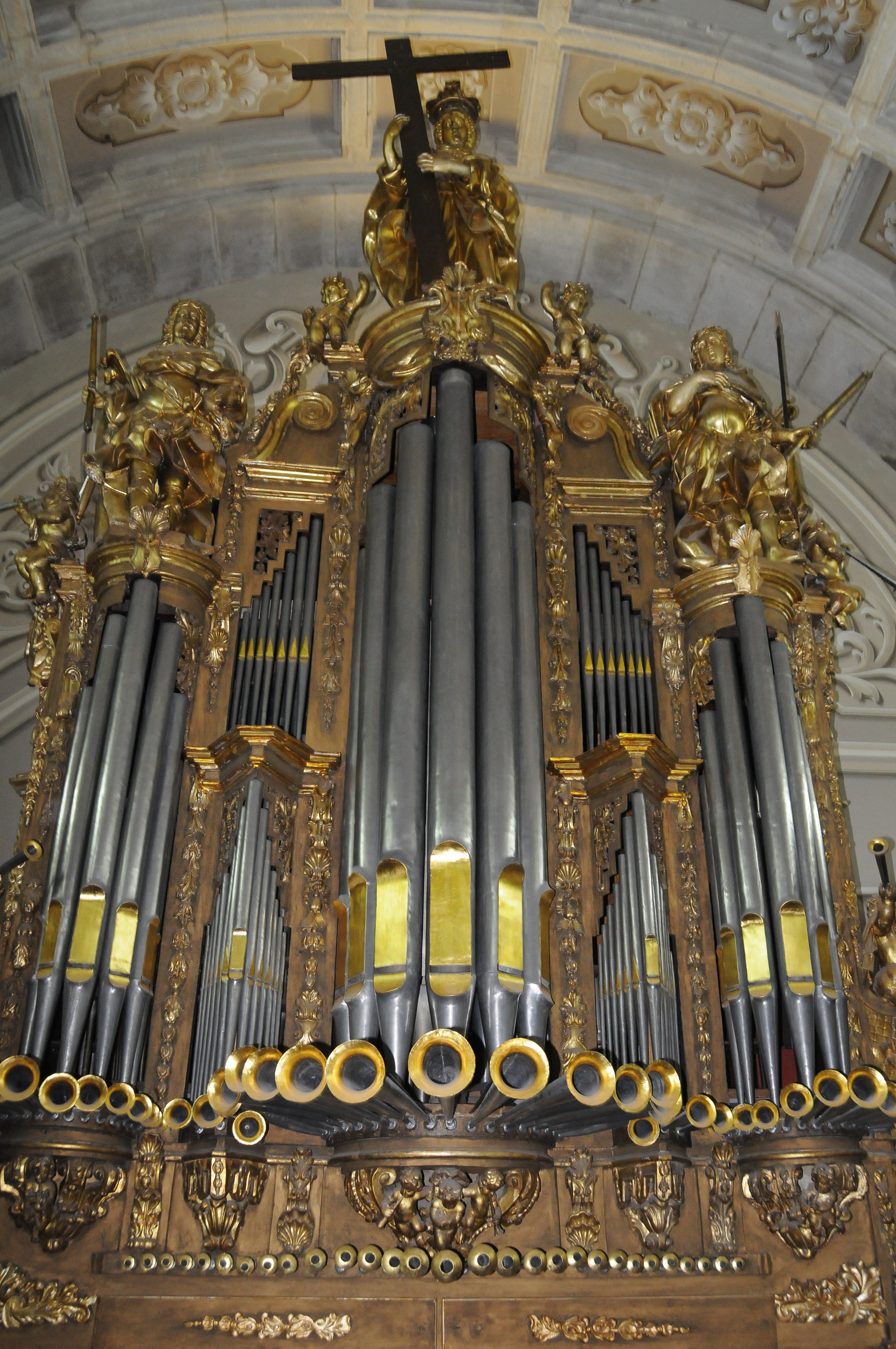
Organ Festival of Braga
Background information
Location(s)	(Portugal) Braga
Years active	2014 – present
Date(s)	April – May
Genre(s)	organ
Venue(s)	Braga Cathedral; Bom Jesus do Monte; Congregados Basilica; Holy Cross Church, Braga and others
Website
Board Members
Artistic Director; José Rodrigues

The Organ Festival of Braga (in Portuguese: Festival de órgão de Braga) is a festival dedicated to the Pipe organ, held annually in Braga since 2014. The festival takes place in several churches in the city that feature pipe organs.

The main purpose of the festival is the safeguarding, valorization and dissemination of the bracarense organism heritage, whose value is incalculable, is currently in the national and international panoramas a recognized cultural event.
