= Gümüşlük =

- Neighbourhood
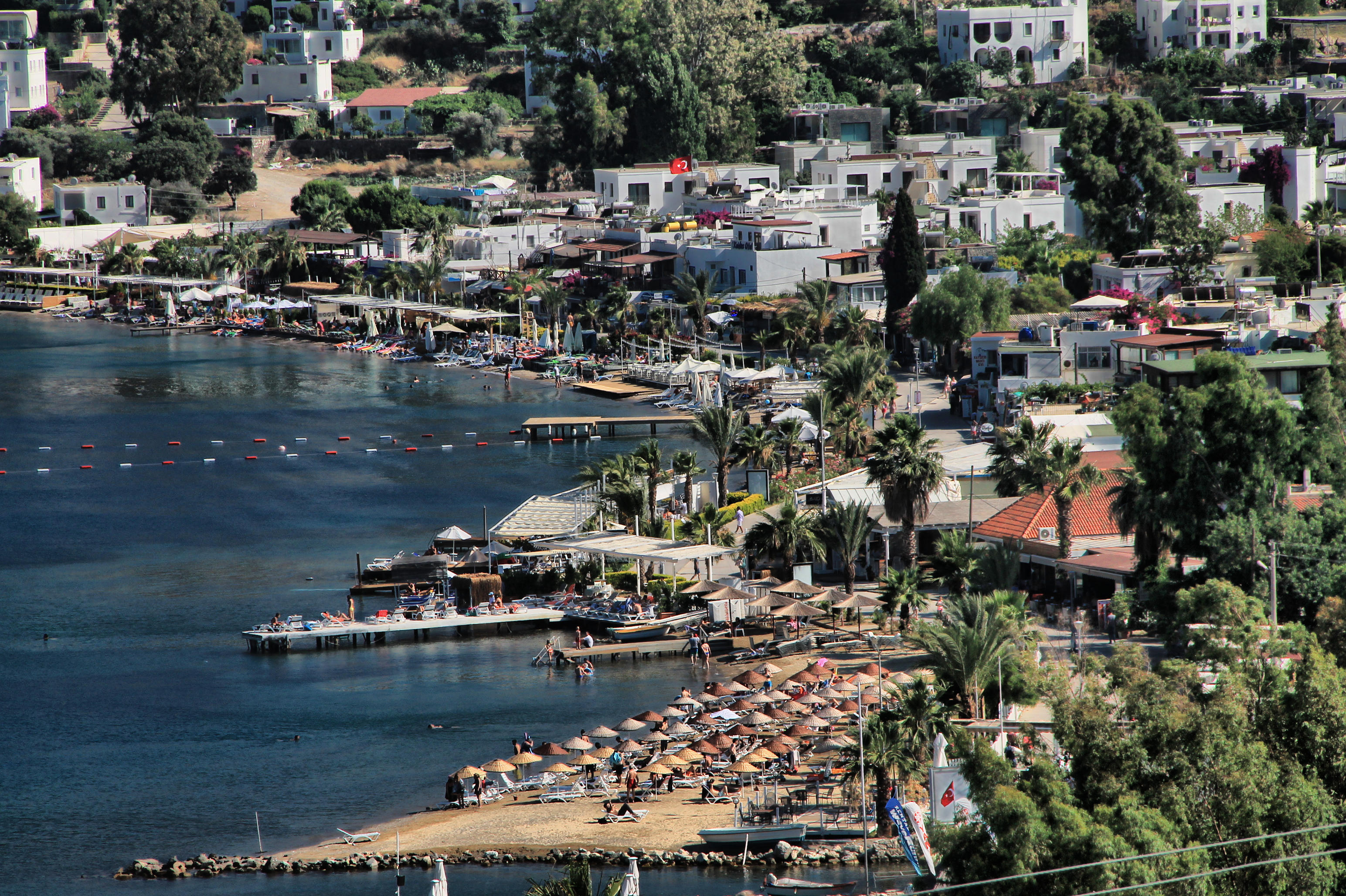

- Location within Turkey Location within Turkey Aegean
- Coordinates: 37°03′14″N 27°14′13″E
- Country: Turkey
- Province: Muğla
- District: Bodrum
- Population (2022): 4,478
- Time zone: UTC+3 (TRT)

Gümüşlük is a neighbourhood of the municipality and district of Bodrum, Muğla Province, Turkey. Its population is 4,478 (2022). Before the 2013 reorganisation, it was a town (belde). It is a seaside village and fishing port.

== Location ==
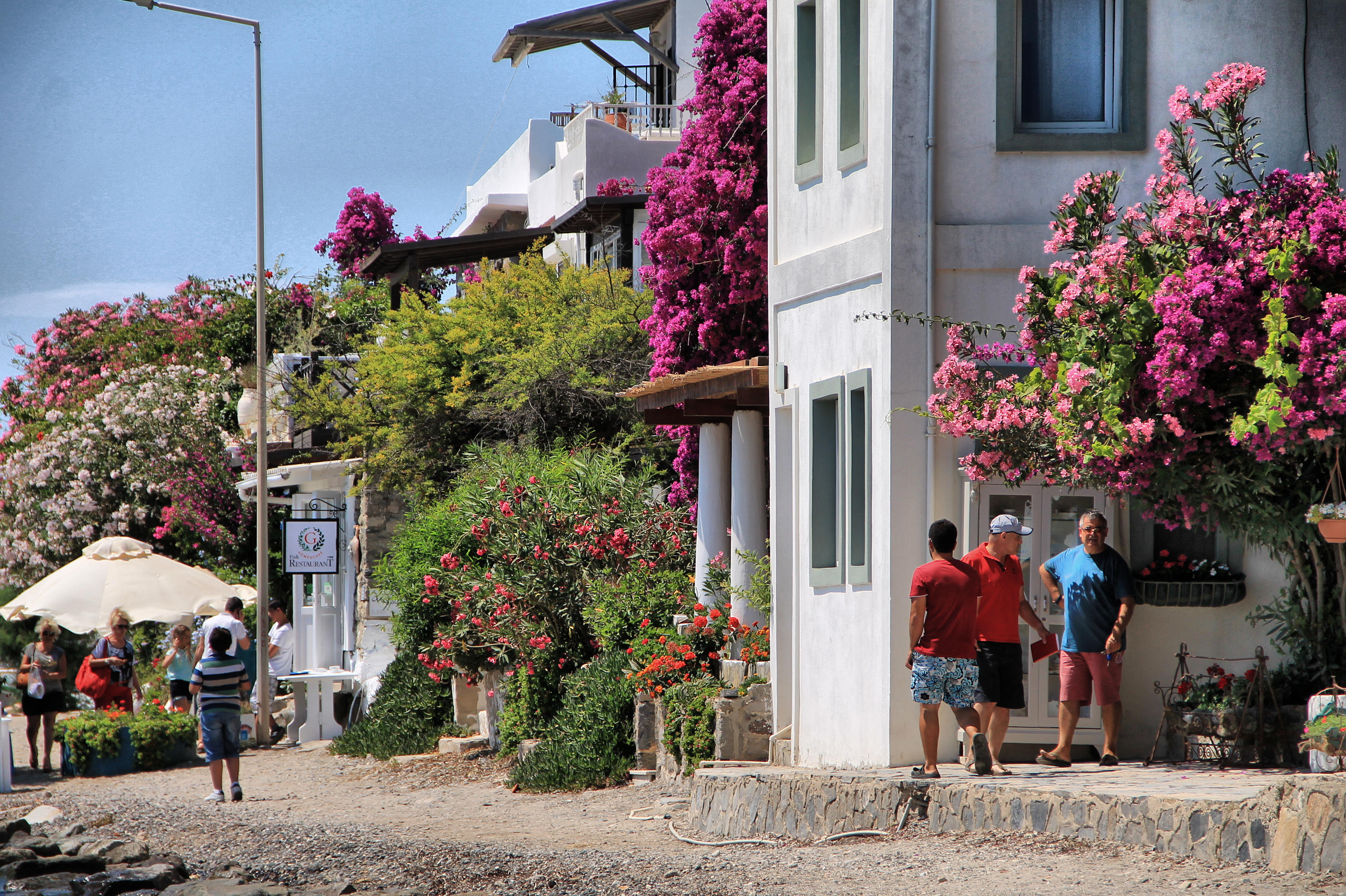
Gümüşlük

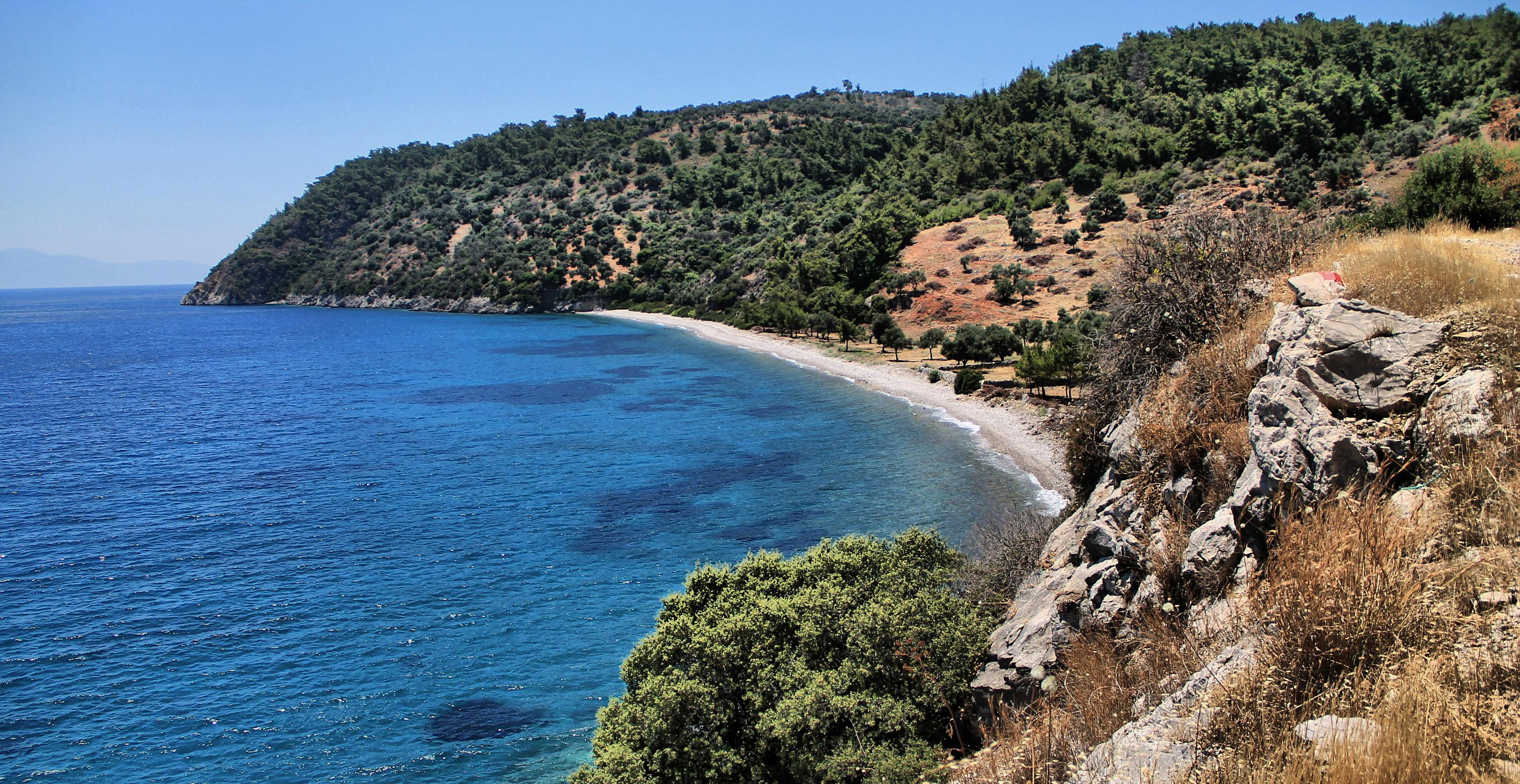
Gümüşlük

In the Aegean Region, it is situated on the remains of the ancient city of Myndos. The remains of the foundations of buildings can be clearly seen in the knee deep water that leads from the middle of the two bays to Rabbit Island (Tavşan Adası).

The hillsides around the Gümüşlük bay area are protected against future developments, which means unlike many other holiday destinations, it has not been over exposed. The island has building fragments scattered around dating back to antiquity and offers a panoramic view of Gümüşlük cove and beach.

There is more to Gümüşlük than the small area near Rabbit Island, the actual village stretches further inland.

The Municipality of Gümüşlük (Gümüşlük Belediyesi) was established in 1999.

== Events ==
Since 2004, the village has played host to the Gümüşlük International Classical Music Festival. This festival is held between July and September and is organized by the Bodrum Classical Music Association.

This annual festival is hosted in the Antique Stone Quarries in the Koyunbaba area of Gümüşlük. King Mausolos collected the stones for both his palace and his Mausoleum at Halicarnassus from this quarry. Events take place in other parts of the Bodrum Peninsula, including Bodrum Castle. The festival also encompasses an annual masterclass programme ( Gumusluk Music Academy) and since 2012; the Ahmed Adnan Saygun Piano Competition.

Gümüşlük has numerous bars, cafés and hostels along the beach-front, some of which host live music events showcasing both local as well as international musicians, singers and DJ's.

== Food and restaurants ==
Gümüşlük has numerous established restaurants along the beachfront, many of whom specialise in fresh fish and seafood along with meze and rakı. There are also two village cafés along the beach-front which serve tea and other non-alcoholic beverages as well as light snacks.

== Mosques ==
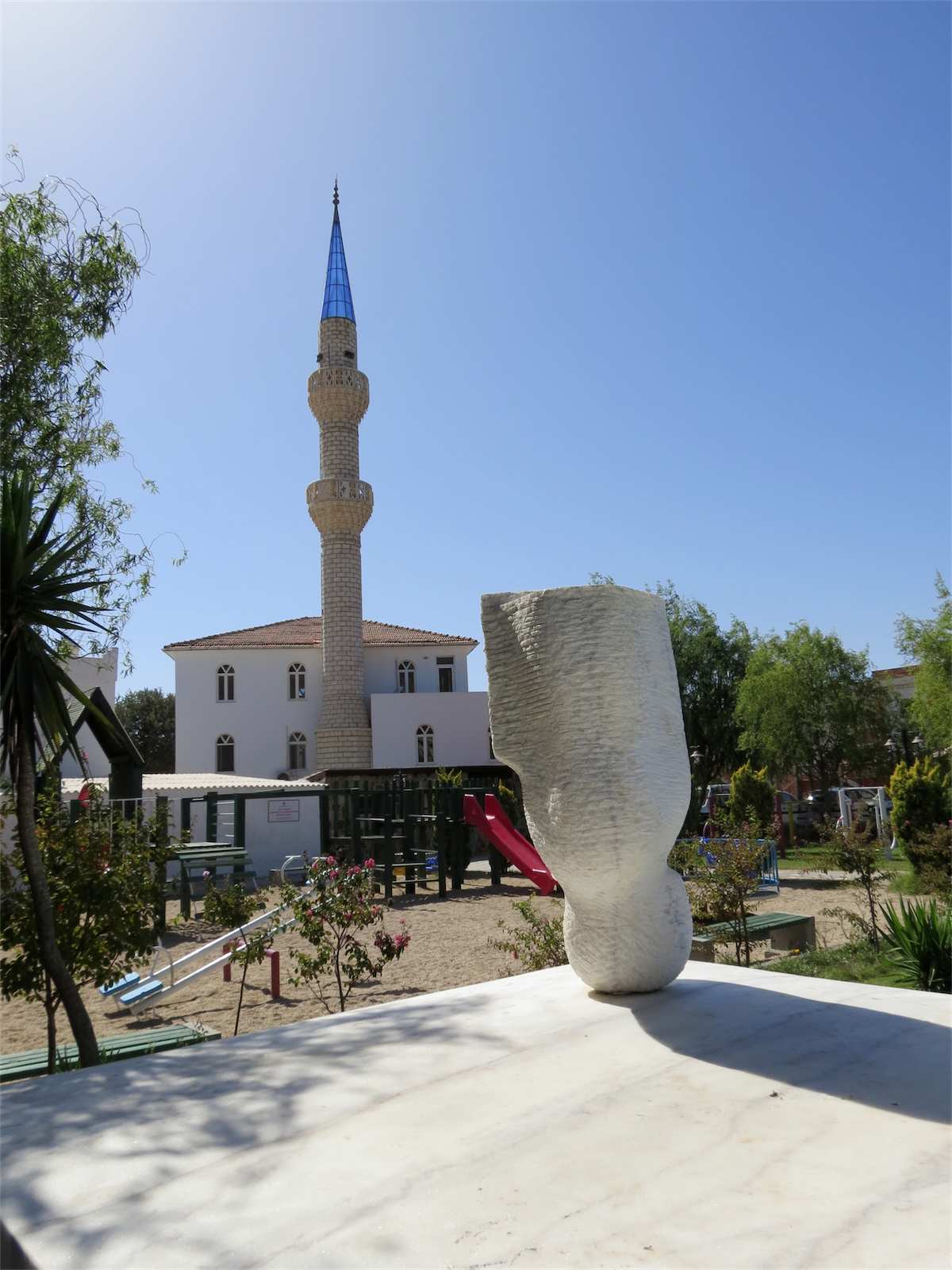
Mosque in the village near Kadri Özsarı Park

There are three mosques in Gümüşlük. One near the harbour, one in the central village area, and one halfway between the two, adjacent to Kadri Özsarı Parkı (Park).

== Markets ==
There is a weekly market held every Wednesday, adjacent to Kadri Özsarı Park. This market sells local seasonal produce, dairy, traditional clothes and textile and housewares.
