= Frutillar Musical Weeks =

Chilean classical music festival

Frutillar Musical Weeks (Semanas Musicales de Frutillar)
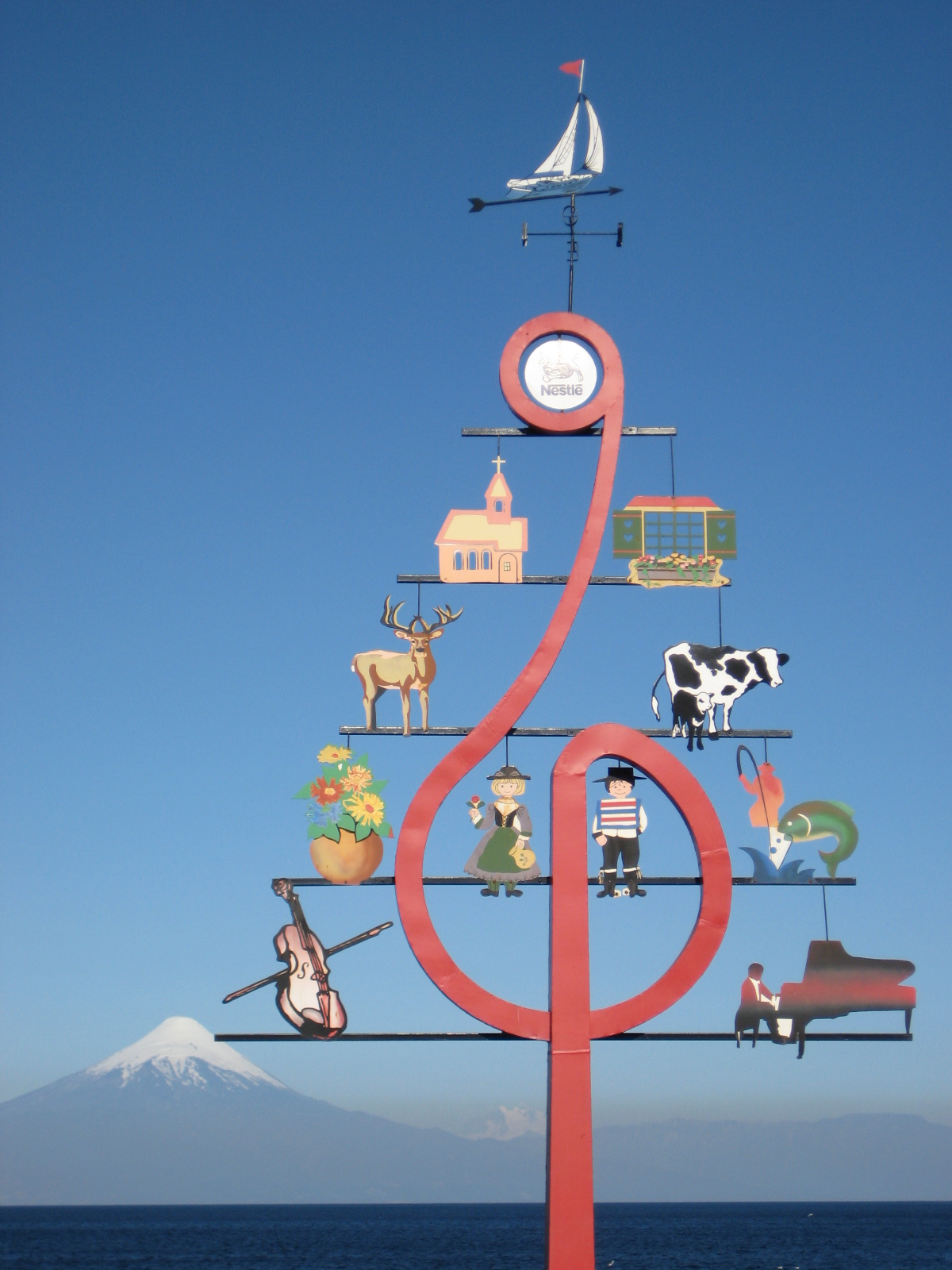
- Frutillar logo with Osorno in the background
- Genre: Classical
- Locations: Frutillar, Los Lagos Region
- Years active: 46
- Website: www.semanasmusicales.cl

The Frutillar Musical Weeks (Semanas Musicales de Frutillar) is a Chilean classical music festival that takes place yearly in the southern Frutillar, Los Lagos Region.

== History ==
The Frutillar Musical Weeks were conceived in 1968 by a group of Frutillar residents supported by the German Chilean League of Santiago. Robert Dick, Arturo Yunge, Alfredo Daetz and Flora Inostroza made up the organizing committee for the first 12 years of the festival's existence, and much of the credit for the success of the festival should be granted to them. Thanks to Flora Inostroza, the Universidad de Chile and the Chilean Air Force have been close collaborators in the festival since its launch.

In the early days, the Musical Weeks were held in Catholic or Lutheran church and then at the municipal gym, until they became so popular that they needed a larger venue.

The Musical Weeks have been held every summer since 1968. Today the festival is one of the most important classical music events in Chile.

== Location and venues ==
Frutillar is a small town and commune located in southern Chile in the Los Lagos Region, 983 km (630 mi) south of Santiago, the capital. The bay of Frutillar is found on the shores of Lake Llanquihue, the largest lake lying entirely within Chile. Frutillar (which translates as “strawberry fields”) is known as the "City of Music" thanks to the festival, and was originally populated mainly by German settlers from Hamburg in the 1850s.

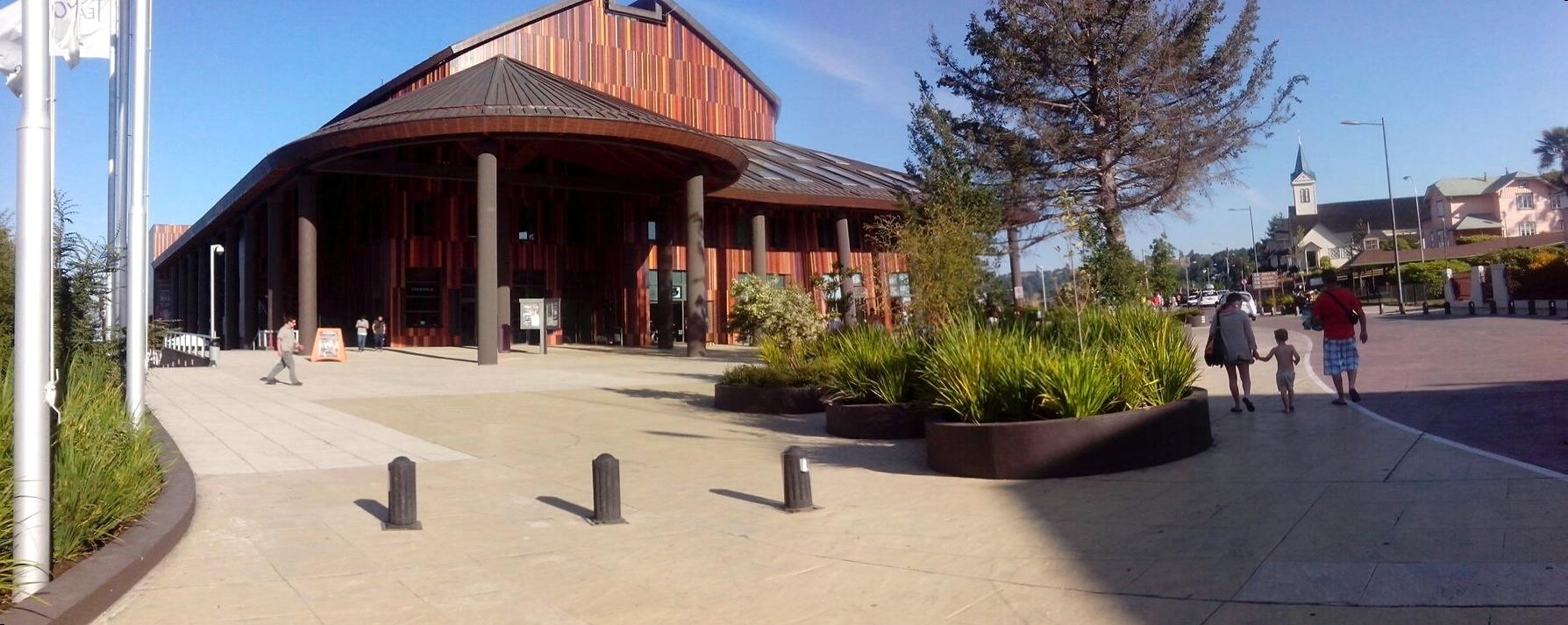
Front view of the Teatro

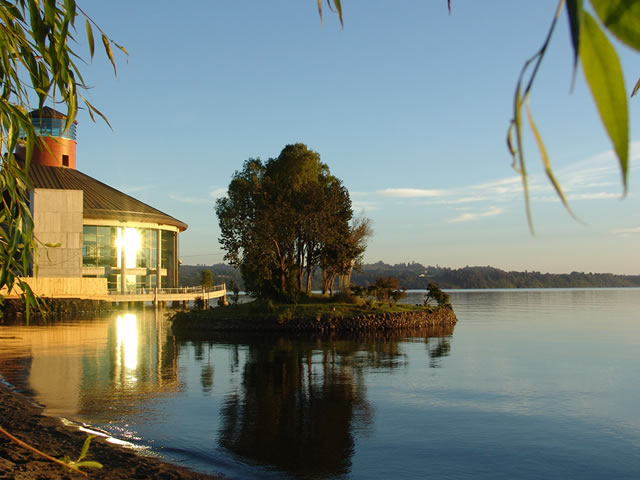
Teatro del Lago

The main venue of the festival since 2010 is the Teatro del Lago (Theatre of the Lake), a theatre and concert hall housed in a 10,000 m2 building. Opening on November 6, 2010 after 12 years in development, it is located right on the shore of Llanquihue Lake so that the interior auditorium enjoys a view of the snow-capped Osorno Volcano across the lake.

The architecture of the building is contemporary, but retains links with the traditional southern Chilean style, strongly influenced by German immigrants. Native materials were used in construction, such as wood, stone and copper.

The largest room in the venue is the "Espacio Tronador", which can seat almost 1,200 spectators. The auditorium is made completely of wood, and the spaces are outlined by the curved lines of the stage, rows of seats and high balconies.

There is also a range of other multipurpose salons and foyers, exhibition areas, rehearsal spaces, conference rooms and congress halls.

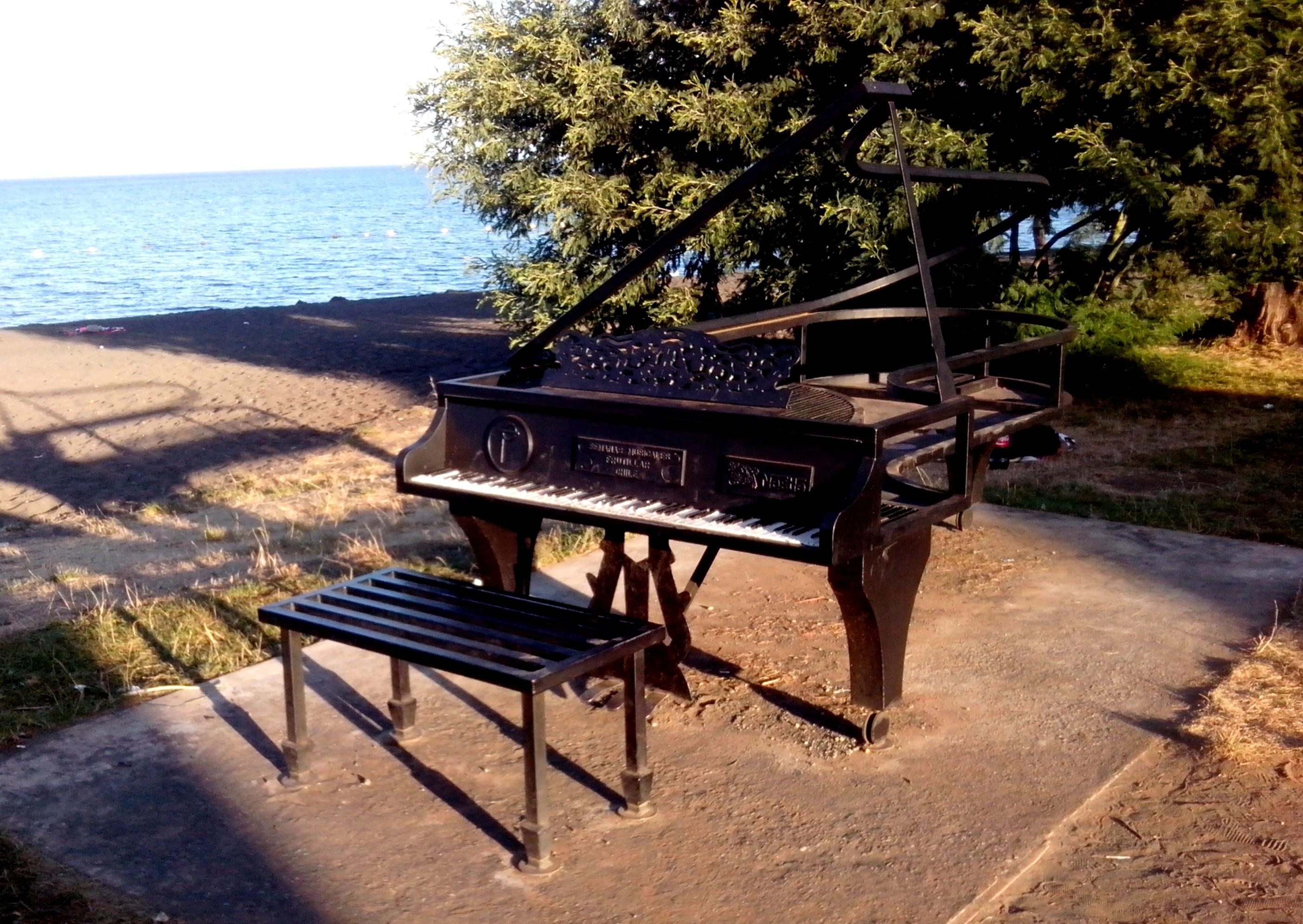
Sculpture Piano de Frutillar.

== The festival ==
The festival takes place between January and February every year and lasts for 10 days. It features more than 40 classical concerts performed by both Chilean and international artists. The program includes music and composers from different periods as well as famous Chilean and international performers and conductors, chamber orchestras, choirs and soloists.

In addition to the events that take place in Frutillar, other nearby towns also hold free concerts.

Sculptures on musical and festival themes can be found all along the Frutillar lakeshore, such as an amphitheatre, a Steinway grand piano and a gazebo, to name a few.

== See also ==
- Music of Chile
- Classical Music
- Frutillar
