= American Festival for the Arts =

American Festival for the Arts (AFA) was founded in 1993 by composer and arts advocate, J. Todd Frazier. AFA's function is to provide community based music education programs and performance opportunities for young people and, through its concert series and outreach, to broaden the audience for both American works and the Classical music repertory. AFA has a series of year-round initiatives and collaborations that support its primary Summer Music Festival program. AFA's Houston campus, currently located at Kinder High School for the Performing and Visual Arts, is designed for musicians and composers ranging in age from elementary to high school.

== History ==
AFA Timeline of Events:

2012: AFA introduced the middle school piano program.

2011: AFA introduces the Composer’s Institute. Total enrollment for summer and year-round programs exceeds 1,000.

2010: AFA expanded to include a Year-Round Academy, including the Houston Girls Chorus, a Chamber Music Program, the Composer Workshop, and in-school programs in local middle and high schools.

2008: Due to the growth AFA programs, AFA relocated the Summer Music Conservatory to Pershing Middle School. The middle school choir program was introduced. Enrollment for the year reached 300 students.

2005: Dr. Michael Remson is made Executive & Artistic Director.

2003: First year of the middle school strings program and the high school choir program. Enrollment for the year reaches 200.

2002: AFA students performed at the World Youth Orchestra for the Summer Olympics.

1999: The AFA Alumni Program created.

1998: AFA composition program began collaboration with the noted Houston Ballet's Ben Stevenson Academy, wherein AFA student composers compose short ballets that are choreographed and premiered by members of the Ben Stevenson Academy. AFA also added a Jazz Program.

1996: AFA established the annual Summer Music Conservatory program and concert series, which was located at Episcopal High School. The program consisted of four components: orchestra, piano, strings, and composition for high school students. A total of 43 students were enrolled in the Summer Music Conservatory.

1993: American Festival for the Arts (AFA) was founded by J. Todd Frazier. American Festival for the Arts is a non-profit 501(c)(3) music education and concert presenting organization based in Houston, Texas.

== Key people ==
- J. Todd Frazier, Founder
- Amanda Fisher, Executive Director
- Amanda Heathco, Senior Director of Programs
