= Mihae Lee =

American pianist of South Korean birth

Mihae Lee is an American pianist of South Korean birth. Born in Seoul, Lee won the Korean National Music Competition which led to her professional solo debut at the age of fourteen with the Korean National Orchestra. In 1976, she moved to the United States to study at the Juilliard School on a scholarship to their pre-college program. She went on to further studies at Juilliard under Martin Canin, earning both a bachelor's and master's degrees in piano performance. She also holds an Artist Diploma from the New England Conservatory where she studied with Russell Sherman.

While studying at Juilliard, Lee won awards including the Juilliard Concerto Competition and First Prize at the Kosciuszko Foundation Chopin Competition. She has since gone on to have an active international career both as a soloist and as a chamber musician. She has performed as a soloist with the Deutsches Symphonie-Orchester Berlin and the Warsaw Philharmonic Orchestra in addition to guest appearances with orchestras in the United States, Europe, and Asia. She also has given recitals at Lincoln Center, Jordan Hall, Carnegie Hall and other venues.

Lee is perhaps best known for her work as a chamber musician. She has been a member of the Boston Chamber Music Society since 1987 and founded the Triton Horn Trio along with violinist Ani Kavafian and her current husband French hornist William Purvis. Lee was previously married to cellist Ronald Thomas with whom she has a daughter, Lili.

== Sources ==
- Artist's biography, Bridge Records
