= Alexandru Tomescu =

Romanian violinist

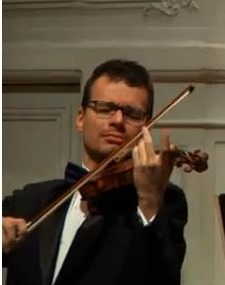
A portrait of Alexandru Tomescu

Alexandru Tomescu (born 15 September 1976) is a Romanian violinist. He plays a 1702 Stradivarius known as the Elder Voicu, which is on loan from the Romanian government until 2023.

He was invited by the South Korean Ministry of Fine Arts (MOFA) to act as a Goodwill Ambassador for Public Diplomacy, part of an MOFA program to build cultural global cultural ties. He has played in an ensemble with gayageum, janggu, piano and violin. MOFA has noted his contributions to spreading and promoting Korean culture.
