= XXIV International Society for Contemporary Music Festival =

1950 music festival in Brussels, Belgium

The XXIV International Society for Contemporary Music Festival was held on June 23–30, 1950 in Brussels. All concerts took place at the Institut National de Radiodiffusion's large studio hall.

This edition was notable for the posthumous premiere of Anton Webern's last work, his Cantata No. 2. Other works performed included:

(Switzerland) Conrad Beck

Sonatina for Piano No. 2

(Denmark) Niels Viggo Bentzon

Chamber Concerto, Op. 52

(Brazil) Eunice Catunda

Hommage to Schönberg

(Norway) Klaus Egge

Sinfonia Giocosa, Op. 22

(East Germany) Hanns Eisler

Sinfonietta, Op. 29

(Netherlands) Marius Flothuis

Concerto for Piano and Chamber Orchestra

(Germany) Wolfgang Fortner

Cello Sonata

(United Kingdom) Peter Racine Fricker

String Quartet No. 1, Op. 8

(Germany) Karl Amadeus Hartmann

Symphony No. 4

(Netherlands) Hans Henkemans

Flute Concerto

(Czechoslovakia) Karel Husa

String Quartet No. 1, Op. 8

(France) André Jolivet

Psyché

(France) René Leibowitz

L'Explication des Metaphores, Op. 15

(Poland) Artur Malawski

Toccata and Fugue in Variation Form for Piano and Orchestra

(France) Darius Milhaud

Les Rêves de Jacob, Dance Suite, Op. 294

(Japan) Shukichi Mitsukuri

Ten Haikai of Bashō

(Poland) Roman Palester

Cantata of the Vistula

(Belgium) Fernand Quinet

Three Symphonic Movements

(United Kingdom) Alan Rawsthorne

Concerto for String Orchestra

(Norway) Harald Saeverud

Symphony No. 5 'Quasi una Fantasia', Op. 16

(Italy) Giacinto Scelsi

La Nascita del Verbo, Cantata
