= Marya Martin =

American musician

Marya Martin is a New Zealand born American flautist, soloist, recitalist, and chamber musician.

Born Mary Martin in New Zealand, Martin studied at the University of Auckland, where she had lessons with Richard Giese, then principal flute in the New Zealand Symphony Orchestra. After graduating in 1976, Martin was awarded a Queen Elizabeth II Arts Council grant to study at Yale University. In 1979, Martin graduated from Yale with a master's degree in flute performance. She shortly thereafter won the 1979 Young Concert Artists International Auditions. She went on to win top prizes in the Naumburg Competition, the Munich International Competition, the Jean-Pierre Rampal International Competition, and the Concert Artists Guild—all within a two-year period. To date, Martin is the only flutist to take top prizes in all of these major competitions. In 1980, Martin made her New York concert debut. Following these successes, Martin moved to Paris to study with Jean-Pierre Rampal at the Nationale Superieur Conservatoire de Paris and then later with Sir James Galway in Lucerne, Switzerland.

In 1984, she founded the Bridgehampton Chamber Music Festival which, under her artistic direction, has done much to foster the development of chamber music presented in historically appropriate settings.

She has performed internationally with orchestras including the Seattle Symphony, Saint Louis Symphony, the Brandenberg Ensemble, and the Mostly Mozart Orchestra. She has also made recital appearances at Carnegie Hall, the Royal Albert Hall and Wigmore Hall in London; the Sydney Opera House; Casals Hall in Tokyo; and other venues in Paris, New Zealand, and Australia. Martin has also toured with James Galway, playing duo concerts with him. As a chamber musician, Martin has appeared with the Chamber Music Society of Lincoln Center, Chamber Music at the Y, the Santa Fe Chamber Music Festival, Music at Angel Fire, and Bravo! Colorado. She has recorded for Musical Heritage Society, Orion Master Recording, Arabesque, New World Records, Well-Tempered Productions, Albany Records, and Kiwi Pacific Records. Martin is on the board of Young Concert Artists and is a jurist in international music competitions. She is on the faculty of the Manhattan School of Music, a position she has had since 1996.

In 2005 Martin received a University of Auckland Distinguished Alumni Award.

Martin is married to Manhattan businessman Ken Davidson.
