= Bridgehampton Chamber Music Festival =

The Bridgehampton Chamber Music Festival (BCMF) in Bridgehampton, New York, was founded in 1984 by New Zealand-born flutist Marya Martin and her husband, Manhattan businessman Kenneth Davidson. The festival presents 13 concerts of chamber music from the end of July to the end of August every summer, and features some of the world's finest musicians. Regular performers include: Ani Kavafian, Anthony Marwood, Frank Huang, Jennifer Frautschi, Amy Schwartz Moretti, Cynthia Phelps, Richard O'Neill, Carter Brey, Clive Greensmith, Peter Stumpf (cellist), Joyce Yang, Gilles Vonsattel, Orion Weiss, Donald Palma, Stewart Rose, Bridget Kibbey and Shane Shanahan, among many others.

2015 marked the inaugural BCMF Spring series with two concerts (March and April) that featured BCMF-regular musicians as well as the Miró Quartet.

The majority of BCMF's concerts take place in the historic Bridgehampton Presbyterian Church, with two other concerts at the Bridgehampton Museum and Parrish Art Museum.
