= Oxford International Piano Festival =

Annual summer music academy in Oxford, England

The Oxford International Piano Festival has taken place annually in Oxford, England, since 1998, and is now established as one of the world's foremost summer music academies.

The Festival comprises several professors and professional pianists giving masterclasses to approximately 20 students over the period of one week, usually in late July or early August. Selection for participants is highly competitive, as the Festival draws interest from young virtuosi from across the world. The Festival also includes a series of concerts given by the professors in a number of Oxford University's concert venues, including Christ Church Cathedral, the Holywell Music Room and the Magdalen College Auditorium.

== History ==
The Festival is hosted by St Hilda's College, Oxford, and the masterclasses take place in the Jacqueline Du Pré Music Building. Previous professors have included Peter Donohoe, Jack Gibbons, Gary Graffman, Niel Immelman, Andras Schiff and Fou Ts'ong. The Festival is run by the Oxford Philomusica, of which Marios Papadopoulos, who also acts as the Artistic Director of the Festival, is conductor.
