= Midsummer Mozart Festival =

The Midsummer Mozart Festival is an annual music festival that exclusively features the music of Wolfgang Amadeus Mozart. The festival was founded by George Cleve in 1974 and is held in the San Francisco Bay Area.

There was no festival in 2020.
