= Music in the Mountains (Colorado) =

Classical music festival in Colorado, US

Music in the Mountains (MiTM) is an annual summer classical music festival located in Durango, Colorado, with additional performances in other regional towns. Performances are held from early July through early August and feature performances by both professional and student artists. The festival was founded by conductor Mischa Semanitzky in 1987 through the support of Fort Lewis College, the Durango Herald, Durango Mountain Resort, Morley Ballantine, and the Bank of Colorado. In 2008 Gregory Hustis, principal horn player for the Dallas Symphony, succeeded Semanitzky as Artistic Director. In the same season, Guillermo Figueroa, conductor of the New Mexico Symphony Orchestra, became the festival's resident conductor and music director. MiTM has announced that violinist Vadim Gluzman will assume the role of Artistic Director in 2025.

Founded in 1997, Conservatory Music in the Mountains offers intensive workshops for student musicians during the summer festival, in conjunction with the New Conservatory of Dallas in Dallas, Texas, and under the direction of Arkady Fomin, a violinist for the Dallas Symphony. Members of the Dallas Symphony were important in beginning the festival, and Music in the Mountains maintains strong ties to the Dallas music community.

Music in the Mountains is active in the Durango community during the off-season, operating, among other things, Music in the Mountains Goes to School, a program which exposes children in the Durango schools to music through a variety of means.

Starting in 2019 and after 32 years of performances, the orchestra concerts were moved from Purgatory Resort's Festival Tent to Fort Lewis College Community Concert Hall.
