= Radiro - International Radio Orchestras Festival =

Romanian classical music festival

Radiro Festival
- Location: Bucharest, Romania
- Inaugurated: 2012
- Sponsor: The Romanian Radio Broadcasting Company
- Website: www.radirofestival.ro

The Radiro Festival (also known as International Radio Orchestras Festival) is one of the biggest classical music festivals in the world, held in Romania. It is the largest international festival dedicated to Radio Symphony Orchestras.
