= La Musica (music festival) =

International Chamber Music Festival in Florida

La Musica Chamber Music is a chamber music festival located in Sarasota, Florida, United States. Concerts are performed annually at the Sarasota Opera House and the Riverview Performing Arts Center.

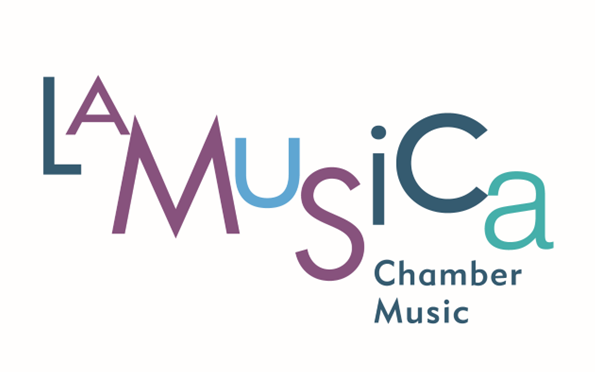

It was founded by Bruno Giuranna, Derek Han, Judy Sherman, and Piero Rivolta in 1985. They were soon joined by Sally Faron and Fred Derr, who remained involved the rest of their lives (until 2023 and 2025, respectively).

From the beginning, the Festival was notable for bringing audiences into the creative process through open rehearsals, lectures, and other opportunities to meet the musicians. In its earliest years, performances were given in the historic Asolo Opera House at the Ringling Museum, but La Musica's audiences soon outgrew its capacity and performances moved to the Sarasota Opera House in 1992.

Throughout its history, La Musica has collaborated with other cultural organizations, both national (Chamber Music Society of Lincoln Center) and local (Sarasota Film Society, Sarasota Ballet, Ringling College of Art and Design, GuitarSarasota). New works have been commissioned and/or premiered by Sussani, Turchi, Wallach, Bracali, Wyner, Hyman, Iyer, Winn, Tower, and Bilik.

Pianist Wu Han was appointed Artistic Director in 2022. La Musica today fulfills its mission to bring together the finest musicians from around the world to present exciting programs of familiar and seldom-heard chamber music, communicating a joy in performance to enthusiastic audiences. La Musica is steered by president Marian Moss and a dedicated board of directors.

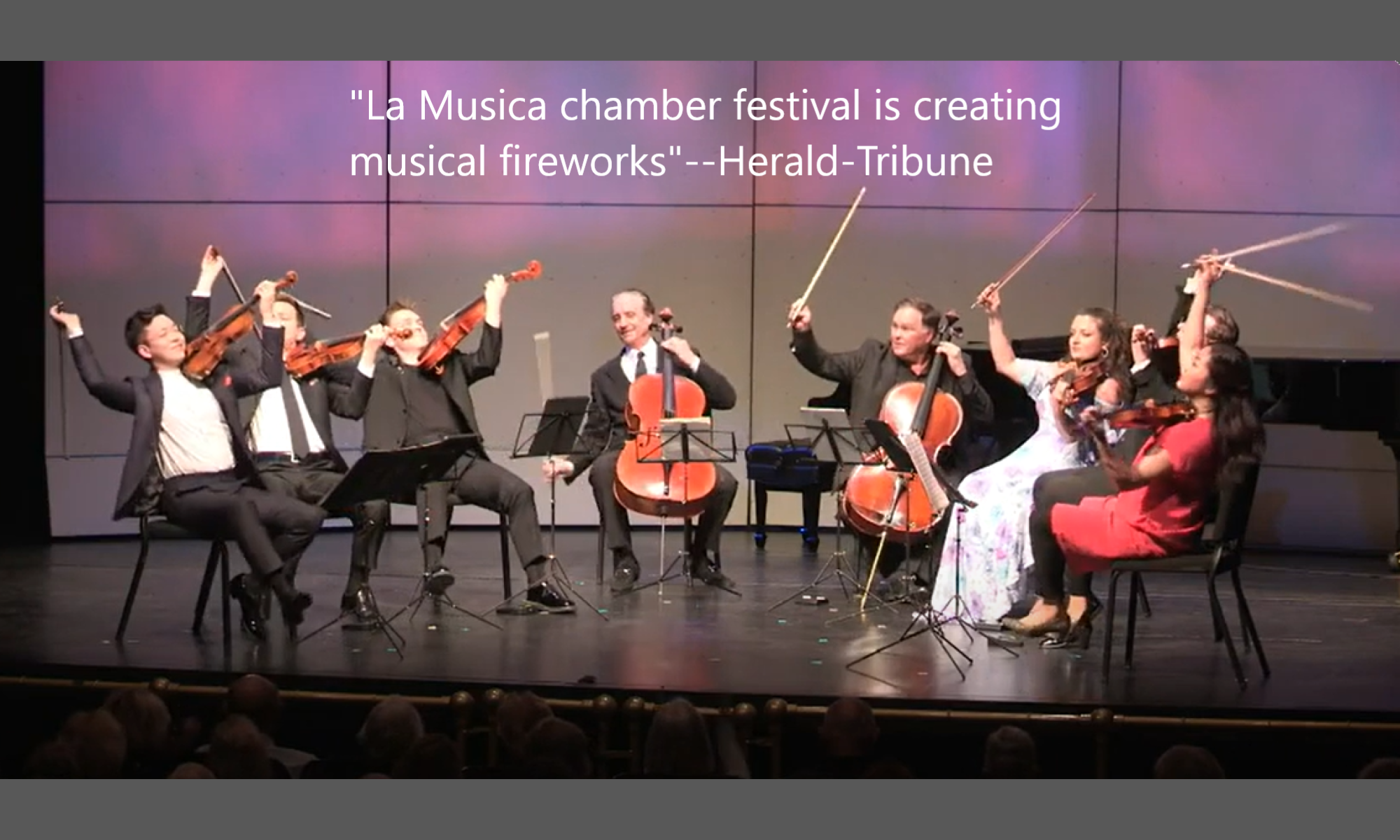
The ensemble brings the Mendelssohn Octet to a rousing climax
