= Jonathan Cohler =

American classical clarinetist (born 1959)

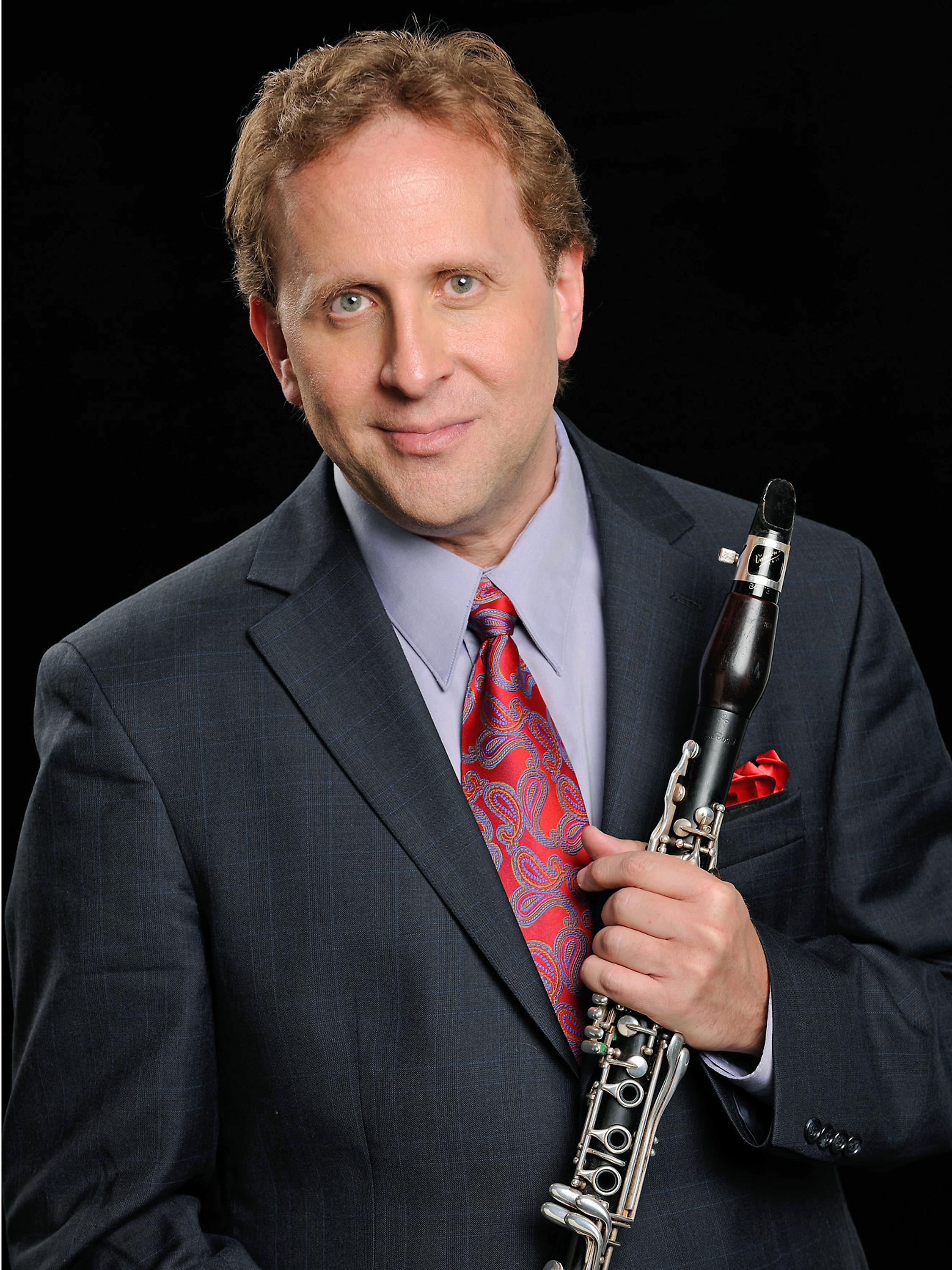
- Born: June 19, 1959 (age 67); Boston, Massachusetts, United States
- Occupations: clarinetist; conductor; music educator
- Musical career
- Genres: Classical
- Years active: 1978–present
- Labels: Ongaku; Crystal
- Website: jonathancohler.com

Jonathan Cohler (born June 19, 1959) is an American classical clarinetist, conductor, music educator and record producer.

== Early career ==
Jonathan Cohler graduated from Harvard University in 1980 with a degree in physics. He studied clarinet with Pasquale Cardillo, Harold Wright, Karl Leister, Charles Neidich and Frank Martin. In 1978, he won the U.S. Components, Inc. Fellowship to the Tanglewood Music Center (then known as the Berkshire Music Center). He also played clarinet for the Colorado Philharmonic Orchestra (now known as the National Repertory Orchestra) in 1979 under conductor Carl Topilow.

He has performed at the International Clarinet Association's annual ClarinetFest (1994, 1997, 2006, 2007, 2008, 2009, 2010, 2013, 2014, 2015, 2016) and has appeared in the Dame Myra Hess Memorial Concert Series in Chicago.

His concerto appearances include Rossini's Introduction, Theme and Variations with Boston Classical Orchestra under Harry Ellis Dickson (1997), Gerald Finzi's Clarinet Concerto (2003) and Copland's Clarinet Concerto (2004) with the Orquesta de Cámara Municipal de Rosario in Argentina (2004), Copland's Clarinet Concerto with the Evergreen Symphony Orchestra at the National Concert Hall of Taiwan in Taipei (2005), Mozart's Clarinet Concerto with the Santo Andre Orchestra in Brazil (2006), Scott McAllister's Black Dog with the Boston Conservatory Wind Ensemble (2011), Debussy's Première rhapsodie with the Boston Conservatory Orchestra (2012), the Gerald Finzi Clarinet Concerto with the Orquestra Sinfônica do Teatro Nacional Claudio Santoro in Brasília, Brazil (2014), and the clarinet concerti and Concertino by Carl Maria von Weber with the Franz Liszt Chamber Orchestra in Budapest (2015).

As a chamber musician Cohler has recorded and performed with the Claremont Trio, violinist Ilya Kaler, and pianists Janice Weber, Randall Hodgkinson, Judith Gordon, and Rasa Vitkauskaite.

Cohler's conducting engagements have included Shostakovich's Fifth Symphony with the Simon Bolivar Orchestra in Caracas, Venezuela, and Tchaikovsky's The Nutcracker with the Indian Hill Orchestra (Groton, Massachusetts) and the Granite State Ballet Company of New Hampshire, and Bartók's Concerto for Orchestra with the Texas All-State Symphony Orchestra in San Antonio. For ten years, from 1996 to 2006, he was the music director of the Brockton Symphony Orchestra.

Cohler has created and run various performing/teaching clarinet festivals since 2000 including well-known clarinetists such as Philippe Cuper (Paris Opera), Alessandro Carbonare (Orchestra of St. Cecilia), Ricardo Morales (Philadelphia Orchestra), Paquito D'Rivera, Wenzel Fuchs (Berlin Philharmonic), and Luis Rossi (Chile). These include the International Clarinet Connection (2000, 2001), the International Clarinet and Saxophone Connection (2002), and the International Woodwind Festival (2005, 2007, 2010, 2012).

Cohler's clarinet students have won top prizes in the Geneva International Clarinet Competition, the International AudiMozart Competition in Rovereto, Italy, the International Clarinet Association High School Competition, the Boston Woodwind Society's Harold Wright Clarinet Merit Award, and others. Cohler has coached groups that have won prizes in the Fischoff National Chamber Music Competition, the Coleman Chamber Music Competition and the Chamber Music Foundation of New England Competition.

Cohler has been an adjudicator for international clarinet and music competitions including the 1st European Clarinet Competition (2010), the Young Artist Competition of the International Clarinet Association (1997, 2009, 2015), and the Canadian National Music Competition.

As of 2024, he is a member of the clarinet, chamber music and conducting faculties of the Longy School of Music in Cambridge, Massachusetts since 1998, and the Boston Conservatory at Berklee since 2005. Through 2011, he was also a faculty member of the New England Conservatory Preparatory School in Boston, where in addition to teaching clarinet and chamber music, he was the assistant conductor of the Youth Philharmonic Orchestra.

== Ongaku records ==
In the early 1990s, Cohler founded the classical music record company Ongaku Records, Inc.

== Climate change denial ==
Cohler publicly denied the scientific consensus on anthropogenic global warming, falsely claiming that "no model has ever correctly modeled any aspect of global warming", even though numerous climate models have produced accurate results over several decades. In another post, Cohler denied the existence of sea level rise, citing a pair of photos of the Sydney harbor as evidence, a claim that is, likewise, factually incorrect. In June 2024, Cohler claimed that "NOBODY who understands advanced math, statistics, and physics, AND who takes the time to investigate the data for themselves could possibly believe in the #ClimateScam.". As of 2021 over 99% of the peer-reviewed scientific literature was in agreement regarding anthropogenic climate change.

== Discography ==
- 1993 Cohler on Clarinet with Judith Gordon (piano), recital of works by Johannes Brahms, Carl Maria von Weber, Heinrich Joseph Bärmann, and Simon A. Sargon. Ongaku Records CD 024-101 OCLC 28096602 (listed in The Penguin Guide to Compact Discs and DVDs Yearbook 2006/7: Best Buys in Classical Music)
- 1994 More Cohler on Clarinet with Randall Hodgkinson (piano), recital of works by Johannes Brahms, Francis Poulenc, Robert Schumann, Darius Milhaud, and Igor Stravinsky. OCLC 29868255 Ongaku Records CD 024-102 (listed in The Penguin Guide to Compact Discs and DVDs Yearbook 2006/7: Best Buys in Classical Music)
- 1994 Brahms Clarinet Sonatas with Judith Gordon (piano), Randall Hodgkinson (piano), recital of works by Johannes Brahms, Ralph Vaughan Williams, and Darius Milhaud. OCLC 950045113 Cover CD, BBC Music Magazine, Vol. 3 No. 2, October 1994
- 1994 Moonflowers, Baby! with Judith Gordon (piano), recital of works by Paul Hindemith, Arthur Honegger, Jean Françaix, Ralph Vaughan Williams, Darius Milhaud, Eugène Bozza, and Meyer Kupferman. OCLC 32353210 Crystal Records CD 733 (MusicWeb International "Recording of the Month", Oct 2010)
- 1995 The Clarinet Alone, recital of works by Donald Martino, Egon Wellesz, Olivier Messiaen, Erland von Koch, William O. Smith, Vincent Persichetti, Willson Osborne, and Niccolò Paganini. OCLC 35862606 Ongaku Records CD 024-105 (nominated for a NAIRD 1995 Indie Award in the classical solo category)
- 1999 David Alpher: American Reflections with David Alpher (composer and piano), Maureen Gallagher (viola), Robert Honeysucker (baritone), Myron Lutzke (cello), Robert Lynam (string bass), Martha Moor (harp), Jean Newton (harpsichord), Kenneth Radnofsky (tenor saxophone), chamber music by David Alpher. OCLC 42347868 Ongaku Records CD 024–112
- 2004 Olivier Messiaen: Quartet for the End of Time with Ilya Kaler (violin), Andrew Mark (cello), Janice Weber (piano). OCLC 68186730 Ongaku Records CD 024-119
- 2008 Rhapsodie Française with Rasa Vitkauskaite (piano), recital of works by Camille Saint-Saëns, André Messager, Charles-Marie Widor, Ernest Chausson, Henri Rabaud, Claude Debussy, Eugène Bozza, and Louis Cahuzac. OCLC 317618441 Ongaku Records CD 024-121
- 2009 Jonathan Cohler & Claremont Trio with Claremont Trio, chamber music by Ludwig van Beethoven, Johannes Brahms, and Ernst von Dohnanyi OCLC 317618279. Ongaku Records CD 024-122 (awarded the "Critic's Choice" by BBC Music Magazine)
- 2013 Romanza with Rasa Vitkauskaite (piano), recital of transcriptions of works by Robert Schumann, Sergei Prokofiev, and Carlos Guastavino. OCLC 966289131 Ongaku Records CD 024-123
- 2014 American Tribute with Rasa Vitkauskaite (piano), recital of works by Leonard Bernstein, Victor Babin, Robert Muczynski, Simon Sargon, Dana Wilson, and Paquito D'Rivera. OCLC 936744916 Ongaku Records CD 024-125
- 2016 Cohler plays and conducts Weber with Jonathan Cohler (conductor), Rasa Vitkauskaite (piano), Franz Liszt Chamber Orchestra, playing and conducting clarinet concerti, overtures, and Polonaise brillante by Carl Maria von Weber. OCLC 959926160 Ongaku Records CD 024-126
- 2020 Cohler plays and conducts Mozart with Jonathan Cohler (conductor/clarinetist), Anima Musicae Chamber Orchestra, including Clarinet Concerto in A Major, KV 622, Symphony No. 35 in D Major, KV 385 ("Haffner"), and the overtures to Don Giovanni, KV 527 and The Magic Flute, KV 620 by Wolfgang Amadeus Mozart. Ongaku Records CD 024-128
- 2020 Rasa Vitkauskaite plays Mozart & Beethoven Concertos with Rasa Vitkauskaite (pianist), Jonathan Cohler (conductor), Franz Liszt Chamber Orchestra, Anima Musicae Chamber Orchestra, including Piano Concerto No. 20 in D Minor, KV 466 by Wolfgang Amadeus Mozart and Piano Concerto No. 3 in C Minor, Op. 37 by Ludwig van Beethoven. Ongaku Records CD 024-129
- 2021 Latin Journey with Rasa Vitkauskaite (piano), recital of works by Carlos Guastavino, Arturo Márquez, Paquito D'Rivera, and Alberto Ginastera. Ongaku Records CD 024-130
- 2023: Mendelssohn: Violin Concerto in E Minor; Double Concerto in D Minor; Capriccio Brillant in B Minor with Ilya Kaler (violin), Rasa Vitkauskaite (piano), Jonathan Cohler (conductor), and Budapest Ferenc Erkel Chamber Orchestra. Works by Felix Mendelssohn. Ongaku Records CD 024-132
