= Nickitas J. Demos =

American classical composer

Nickitas John Demos (born 1962) is a Greek and American composer. He is known for his inventive inclusion of Greek elements and influence in his music.

== Education ==
Demos holds a Doctor of Musical Arts degree in composition from the Cleveland Institute of Music and Case Western Reserve University, where he studied with Donald Erb. He also holds a Master of Music degree in composition from the Indiana University Jacobs School of Music, where he studied with Donald Erb, Eugene O’Brien, Harvey Sollberger, and John Eaton. He received a Bachelor of Music degree in clarinet performance from the University of North Carolina at Chapel Hill, where he studied composition with Roger Hannay.

== Critical acclaim ==
His music has been described as “rich… powerful” having “remarkable substance” as well as “lively… attractive, kinetic and… intriguing” by the Atlanta Journal-Constitution; as “fresh and exhilarating” by The Nashville Scene; as “…compelling…deeply evocative music…well worth exploring...” by the Georgia Music News and as “ambitious…sophisticated” and “…a reflection of the current mix of styles and aesthetic postures” by the New York-based magazine, The New Music Connoisseur. The premiere of his work, "Waltzing through the Endtime," based on the poetry of David Bottoms, was hailed as one of the best classical music events of 2005 by the Atlanta Journal-Constitution and his activities were also cited in the April 2004 issue of GRAMOPHONE magazine.

== Performances ==
Demos has received performances by the Cleveland Orchestra, Philadelphia Orchestra, Orchestra of St. Luke's, Nashville Chamber Orchestra, Nashville Symphony, Cincinnati Symphony Orchestra, Colorado Springs Symphony, Oregon Symphony and the New World Symphony among others. His works for wind ensemble have been performed by the U.S. Army Band, “Pershing’s Own” and the Conservatorio de Música de Puerto Rico Symphonic Band among others. His chamber works have been performed by North/South Consonance, Thamyris New Music Ensemble, Bent Frequency, the Atlanta Chamber Players, Sonic Generator, Terminus Ensemble and the neoPhonia New Music Ensemble among others. His commissions include works for the Cleveland Orchestra, Nashville Chamber Orchestra, Atlanta Ballet, the Atlanta Chamber Players and the Georgia Music Teachers Association.

== Honors and awards ==
He is the recipient of numerous grants and awards including semifinalist in the 2015 Rapido! Composition Competition; a MacDowell Fellowship (2012); Grand Prize in the 2004 Millennium Arts International Competition for Composers; Grand Prize in the 2005 Holyoke Civic Symphony Composition Competition; Birmingham and Atlanta Prizes in the Hultgren 2005 Solo Cello Works Biennial Composition Competition; and 17 ASCAP Awards among others. He has received Honorable Mentions in the 2004 Music Teachers National Association (MTNA) Shepherd Composer of the Year Award, International Clarinet Association Composition Competition and the ASCAP/Rudolf Nissim Composers Competition among others. In July 2012, Demos was inducted as a National Patron of Delta Omicron. Demos’ works have been programmed at festivals, symposia and conferences including the 43rd Dimitria Festival (Thessaloniki, Greece); the 18th International Review of Composers (Belgrade Serbia); the International Festival – Institute at Round Top (TX); the Ernest Bloch Music Festival (Newport, OR); the New Music Forum Festival of Contemporary Music (San Francisco, CA); and at National and Regional Conferences of the Society of Composers, Inc. (SCI) and the College Music Society (CMS). His music is self-published through Sylvan Lake Press (ASCAP) and has been recorded by Ablaze Records, Albany Records, MSR Classics and Capstone Records and has been broadcast on WABE-FM 90.1 (Atlanta NPR affiliate) and Counterstream Radio among others.

== Today ==
Demos currently holds the positions of professor of composition and coordinator of composition studies at the Georgia State University School of Music and is the founder and artistic director of the neoPhonia New Music Ensemble. Outside of his work at Georgia State University, he currently sits on the board of directors for the MacDowell Arts Colony and served on the executive committee of the Society of Composers, Inc. (SCI) from 2005 to 2014. He is a co-founder of Bent Frequency, a professional contemporary music ensemble based in Atlanta and served on their artistic board and as composer-in-residence from 2003 to 2008. He also serves as the musical director for the Greek Islanders, an ethnic ensemble he founded in 1982 specializing in Greek folk music.
