= Gerardo Teissonniere =

Puerto Rican pianist and teacher (born 1961)

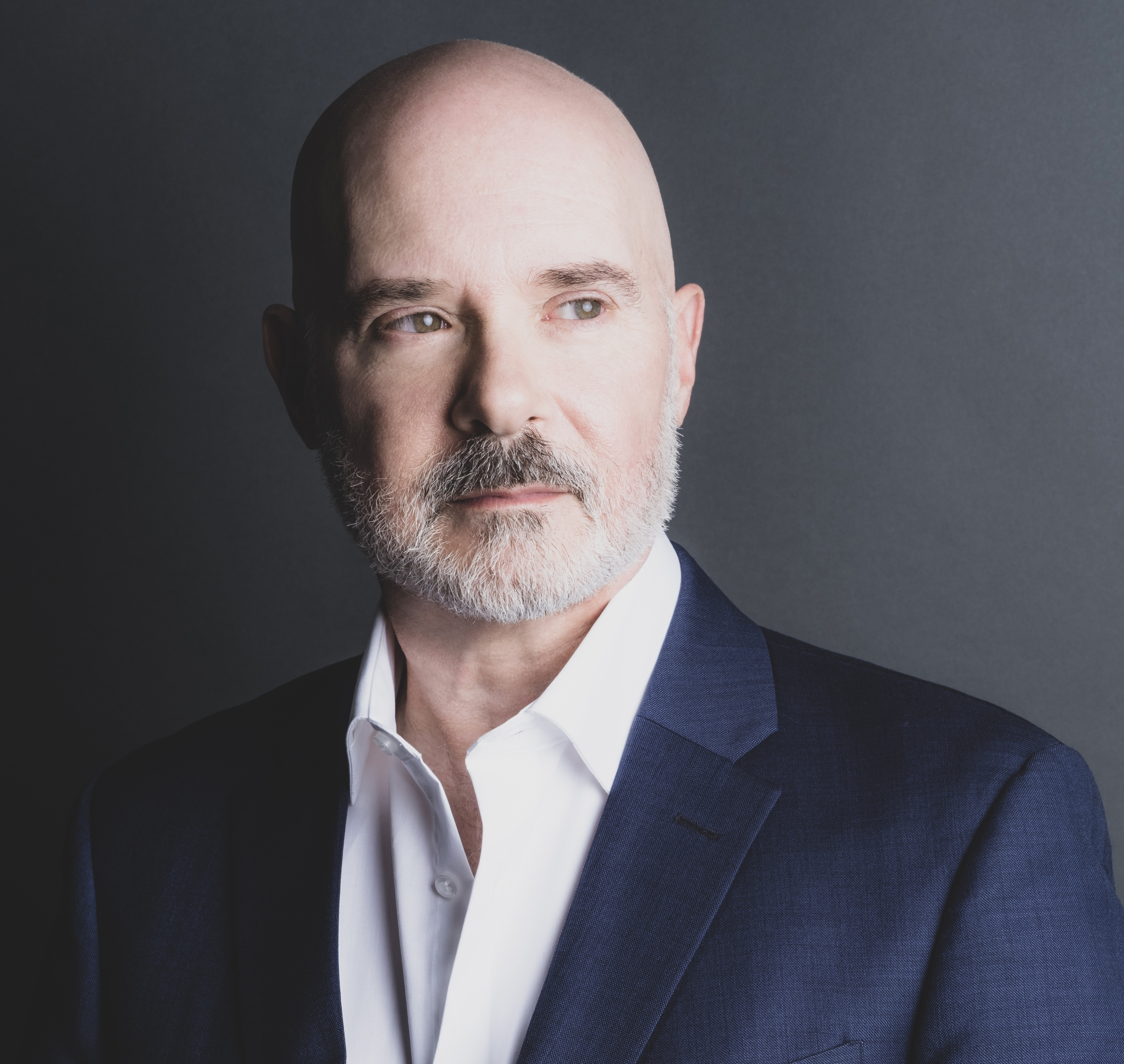
Gerardo Teissonnière

Gerardo Teissonnière (born March 29, 1961, in Ponce, Puerto Rico) is a Puerto Rican pianist and teacher.

== Education ==
Gerardo Teissonnière studied at the Conservatory of Music in Puerto Rico with Jesús María Sanromá and at the Cleveland Institute of Music with Vitya Vronsky (Vronsky & Babin), both disciples of Artur Schnabel and Alfred Cortot, and at the Aspen Music Festival with Jeaneane Dowis, former assistant to Rosina Lhévinne at the Juilliard School. He also pursued post-graduate studies in Europe with Dmitri Bashkirov and Joaquín Achúcarro.

== Professional career ==
Since his American debut at the National Gallery of Art in Washington, D.C., Gerardo Teissonnière has given première performances of music by 20th-century composers such as Pablo Casals, Aaron Copland, Claude Debussy, Alberto Ginastera, Lowell Liebermann, Darius Milhaud, Arvo Pärt and Heitor Villa-Lobos. In 2004 he embarked on a five-recital cycle presenting the complete Mozart piano sonatas. In 2005 he was invited to perform in Poland in conjunction with commemorative events of the 150th anniversary of Chopin's death and the fifteenth Chopin International Piano Competition. Teissonniere has recorded for the Steinway & Sons label and is a Steinway Artist and faculty member of the Cleveland Institute of Music.

== Awards and honors ==
Gerardo Teissonnière is the recipient of the 2025 Governor’s Award For The Arts in the Individual Artist category, the Arthur Loesser Memorial Award and the 2008 Alumni Achievement Award from the Cleveland Institute of Music. In 2008 he was awarded the Judson Smart Living Award in Education. He has also been nominated for the Ohio Arts Council's Governors' Award for the Arts.

== Discography ==
| Title | Album details |
|---|---|
| Beethoven: The Last Sonatas | Released: March 4, 2022; Label: Steinway & Sons; Format: CD, digital download, streaming |
| Schubert: The Complete Impromptus | Released: October 6, 2023; Label: Steinway & Sons; Format: CD, digital download, streaming |
| SOLER! | Released: August 7, 2026; Label: Steinway & Sons; Format: CD, digital download, streaming |

== See also ==
- List of Puerto Ricans
- Corsican immigration to Puerto Rico
