= Zsolt Bognár =

Zsolt Bognár may refer to:

- Zsolt Bognár (footballer) (born 1979), Hungarian football player
- Zsolt Bognár (pianist) (born 1982), American classical pianist
