= Zsolt Bognár (pianist) =

American pianist (born 1982)

Zsolt Bognár (/ˈʒoʊlt ˈboʊɡnɑːr/; born 1982) is an American pianist and commentator who is best known for hosting the web series Living the Creative Life, formerly Living the Classical Life.

== Early life and education ==
Bognár was born in Urbana, Illinois to a Hungarian father and Filipina mother. He began piano studies at age nine, studying with Roger Shields. Bognár continued studies at the Walnut Hill School for the Arts in Boston, and at the Preparatory School of the New England Conservatory of Music, where he studied with Sylvia Chambless, Patricia Zander, and Randall Hodgkinson. Bognár received his Bachelor and Master of Music degrees from the Cleveland Institute of Music, where he studied with Sergei Babayan and Paul Schenly.

== Pianist ==
Bognár has given recitals and concerts in U. S. cities including at the Kennedy Center Washington, D. C., in Chicago, Boston, Los Angeles, and at Alice Tully Hall and the 92nd Street Y in New York City. Internationally he has performed in Suntory Hall in Tokyo; at the Berlin Konzerthaus for the Young Euro Classic festival, at Rubinstein Hall in Munich, and at Mozarthaus in Vienna. In 2007 Bognár was hosted as a fellow at the Music Academy of the West in Montecito. Bognár has appeared with orchestras including the Young Musicians Foundation Debut Orchestra in Los Angeles, the Dayton Philharmonic, and the National Repertory Orchestra. As chamber musician he has collaborated with members of the Cleveland Orchestra and with Nathan Olson, Jessica Hung, Joshua Roman, and Sergei Babayan. Bognár has premiered works by composers Michael Brown and Dan Visconti. He was a prizewinner in the Stravinsky Awards International Competition for young pianists aged 6–18, the Harvard Musical Association competition, Allegro Vivo Competition in Austria, and the Artist Presentation Society Awards

Bognár's recording of piano music by Schubert and Liszt, titled “Franz and Franz”, was recorded in Berlin with Philip Nedel and released in 2013 by the Con Brio Classics label.

== Host ==
In 2011, Bognár co-founded Living the Classical Life, a production of Elyria Pictures, which he also hosts. The series is an extensive, in-depth musician-to-musician conversational portraits with guests including Vladimir Ashkenazy, Joyce DiDonato, Daniil Trifonov, Yuja Wang, John Corigliano, Deborah Voigt, Yefim Bronfman. As of October 2026, over 80 episodes have been released, with over three million channel views on the series’ YouTube channel. The episode with pianist Marc-André Hamelin was premiered at the Gilmore Festival in Kalamazoo, Michigan. In 2018, Living the Classical Life was awarded the Classical Post Award for Most Innovative Presenter - Media.

The new channel, Living the Creative Life, opened August 2022 with an interview with actor Alec Baldwin. As of 2026, with over 100 episodes, it has nearly 3 million channel views. The show highlights artists and luminaries in all of the creative arts, including interviews with pianists Evgeny Kissin and András Schiff, Nobel Peace Prize Chair Jørgen Watne Frydnes, Viñoly Archictects, authors Alan Walker and Jan Swafford, violinists Daniel Hope and Maxim Vengerov, and many more, filmed on location around the world. Bognár's poignant interview with pianist Lars Vogt, filmed just before his passing in 2022, was featured in the New Yorker.

Bognár also was anchor of broadcasts from Live from Carnegie Hall in 2020, the Mainly Mozart Festival in Miami, the Cleveland International Piano Competition, and Piano Cleveland's Virtu(al)oso Competition. In addition, Bognár has presented two Ted Talks, one dealing with overcoming depression through music.

In 2019, Bognár was appointed general manager of Music from the Western Reserve.

Bognár lives in Cleveland.
