= Marcus Thompson =

American violist (born 1946)

Marcus Thompson (born 1946) is a violist and viola d'amore player known for his work as a recitalist, orchestral soloist, chamber musician, recording artist and educator. Thompson is a founding member and is currently artistic director of the Boston Chamber Music Society, and is Institute Professor at MIT and a faculty member at the New England Conservatory of Music.

== Early life and education ==
Thompson was born in New York's South Bronx. He began studying the violin at age six and, at the age of fourteen, entered The Juilliard School Pre-College where he studied with Louise Behrend. Thompson remained at the Juilliard School and eventually earned his doctoral degree in viola and viola d'amore studies. Thompson primarily studied with Walter Trampler while attending the school and was the first person to earn a doctorate in viola performance from Juilliard.

== Music career ==
Thompson made his professional and New York debut at Carnegie Hall in the Young Concert Artists Series in 1968. Since then, Thompson has presented recitals at the Metropolitan Museum of Art in New York, the Isabella Stewart Gardner Museum in Boston, Orchestra Hall in Minneapolis, the Terrace Theater at the Kennedy Center in Washington, D.C., Herbst Theatre in San Francisco, numerous colleges and universities, and many other places. To mark the Hindemith Centenary, he performed a recital of the complete sonatas with piano for viola and viola d'amore composed by Paul Hindemith in Boston's Jordan Hall with pianist Judith Gordon.

As a soloist, Thompson has performed with many of the world's finest orchestras including the Chicago Symphony Orchestra, the Philadelphia Orchestra, the National Symphony Orchestra, the Cleveland Orchestra, the Atlanta Symphony, the Los Angeles Chamber Orchestra, the Saint Louis Symphony, the Boston Pops, the Chicago Sinfonietta, the Slovenian Radio Orchestra and the Czech National Symphony Orchestra among others.

Thompson has also worked with some of the world's finest conductors including Charles Dutoit, Michael Tilson Thomas, Jahja Ling, Yoel Levi, John Harbison, and Paul Freeman among others.

Thompson has also worked with some of the world's finest musicians, including violinist Yehudi Menuhin.

As a chamber musician Thompson has appeared as the guest of the Audubon Quartet, Borromeo String Quartet, Cleveland String Quartet, Emerson String Quartet, Miami String Quartet, Muir String Quartet, Orion String Quartet, Shanghai String Quartet, and Vermeer Quartet. Thompson has also collaborated with the Fine Arts Quartet, Endellion String Quartet, St. Petersburg String Quartet, Biava String Quartet, Jupiter String Quartet, Vogler String Quartet, and Oregon String Quartet. He has participated in chamber music festivals in Rockport (MA and ME), Chestnut Hill (CT), Sitka (AK), Anchorage, Seattle, Northwest (OR), Los Angeles, Okinawa, Santa Fe, Vail, Dubrovnik, Spoleto, Montreal, and Rio de Janeiro. Among his career highlights are performances with the Chamber Music Society of Lincoln Center in a Live from Lincoln Center broadcast and at a Presidential Inaugural Concert at the Kennedy Center. He has also appeared with the Chamber Music Society of Amsterdam in the Netherlands, and is a founding member of the Boston Chamber Music Society.

Thompson also makes frequent appearances with Baroque ensembles, such as the Chamber Orchestra of Albuquerque, as a viola d'amore player. Thompson plays a viola d'amore that was made in Bohemia (known today as the Czech Republic) in the mid-18th century. Thompson's first encounter with the viola d'amore was when he heard a performance of Hindemith's Sonata for Viola d'Amore and Piano played by Walter Trampler and James Levine. The sound of the viola d'amore, even in a modern piece, was so enchanting to Thompson that he immediately fell in love with it. Since then, Thompson has dedicated his time to learning the viola d'amore with an attention to Baroque performance practices like inflected bowing, limited vibrato, and the use of harmonics. Thompson believes that playing the viola d'amore has enhanced his viola playing by widening the color palette and clarifying distinctions in musical expression.

== Teaching career ==
Thompson serves as a member of the viola faculty at the New England Conservatory and as the Robert R. Taylor Professor of Music at the Massachusetts Institute of Technology. He founded the university's performance programs in private studies and chamber music. He has been recognized for extraordinary teaching at MIT with an appointment as a Margaret MacVicar Faculty Fellow.

His previous teaching appointments have been at institutions including The Juilliard School Pre-College Division, Oakwood College, Mt. Holyoke College, and Wesleyan University.

A frequent guest presenter of viola and chamber music master classes, he has recently conducted master classes at the University of Oregon School of Music, Williams College Music Department, Boston Conservatory (String Seminar), and for Project STEP at Symphony Hall, Boston. Mr. Thompson serves on the Board of Project STEP, is a member of Chamber Music America and the American String Teachers Association. He is also a member of the Viola d'Amore Society and of the American Viola Society. Mr. Thompson served as host director for the 1985 American Viola Society Congress XIII held at the New England Conservatory of Music in Boston.

In 2015, Thompson was promoted to Institute Professor, MIT's highest faculty rank, normally held by only twelve professors.

== Recordings ==
Thompson has recorded solo works by Bartók, Bloch, Hindemith, Martin, Jongen, Françaix, and Serly on the Centaur and Vox Turnabout labels. He can also be heard on more than 20 CDs by various musical ensembles. These include performances by the Amsterdam Chamber Music Society, the Boston Chamber Music Society, the Czech National Symphony Orchestra, and the Slovenian Radio Symphony Orchestra.
