= Dennis Eberhard =

American composer

- Occupation: Composer

Dennis Eberhard (1943-2005) was an American composer. In his youth he was crippled by polio, which contributed to respiratory problems that contributed to his death in 2005. Eberhard was an active composer for more than 30 years and was a member of the Cleveland Composers Guild and Vox Novus.

== Education ==
He was educated at Cleveland Institute of Music, Kent State University, the University of Illinois at Urbana–Champaign and the Chopin Institute in Warsaw, Poland. His teachers included: Marie Martin, Frederic Coulter, Salvatore Martirano, Wlodzimierz Kotonski, Gordon Mumma and Herbert Brün.

== Career ==
Composing both concert music and music for film and theater, Mr. Eberhard also worked with John Cage and Lejaren Hiller, participating in the realization of their compositions Music Circus and HPSCHD. He taught at the University of Illinois, Western Illinois University, the University of Nebraska, Oberlin Conservatory of Music, and Cleveland State University, while lecturing widely on his own music at such institutions as the Cleveland Institute of Music, Cornell University, Penn State, the Cincinnati Conservatory of Music, the University of New Mexico, and the São Paulo State University in Brazil.

== Awards and recognitions ==
In his lifetime he received a Fulbright Grant, a Rome Prize Fellowship, two grants from the National Endowment for the Arts, five grants from the Ohio Arts Council, three MacDowell Colony Residency Grants, the Cleveland Arts Prize, the 1990 Award of Achievement in Classical Music from Northern Ohio Live Magazine, and the 1993 Distinguished Alumnus Award from Kent State University. His music and papers are housed at the Sousa Archives and Center for American Music at the University of Illinois at Urbana—Champaign.

== Discography ==
Piano Concerto / Prometheus Wept - Dennis Eberhard - Naxos American Classics - 2004

Shadow of the Swan - Piano concerto

- I. The Fall
- II. Requiem
- III. Quickening

Dinova, Halida, piano St. Petersburg Cappella Symphony Orchestra Tchernoushenko, Alexander, Conductor

Prometheus Wept Migunov, Peter, bass St. Petersburg Cappella Symphony Orchestra Tchernoushenko, Alexander, Conductor

== Articles and reviews ==
- "Recital: Alice Giles", by Will Crutchfield, The New York Times, October 29, 1987
- "MUSIC: CLEVELAND COMPOSERS", by Tim Page, The New York Times, February 21, 1983
