= Tony Ann =

Canadian pianist and composer

- Born: Beijing, China
- Origin: Toronto, Canada
- Genres: Instrumental pop, neoclassical
- Years active: 2016–present
- Label: Decca Records France

Tony Ann (born Beijing, China) is a Canadian pianist and composer. He moved to Toronto, Canada and gained international recognition through digital platforms and touring. In 2017, he was invited to tour with The Chainsmokers. In 2025, Les Echos described him as a "social media piano phenomenon".

== Early life and education ==
Tony Ann grew up in Toronto, Canada, where he began studying piano at a young age and pursued formal musical training during his school years. He studied classical piano at the Cleveland Institute of Music and later pursued composition and production at Berklee College of Music.

== Career ==
Tony Ann began gaining international attention in 2017 while studying at Berklee College of Music after his piano cover of The Chainsmokers' song "Paris" went viral online. The duo subsequently invited him to join their tour as a keyboardist. During this period, Tony Ann contributed as a songwriter and collaborator on projects associated with The Chainsmokers. Following his studies, he developed an international audience through digital platforms, where he shared original piano compositions and arrangements. In 2023, he released a trilogy of extended plays — Emotionally Blue, Emotionally Orange, and Emotionally Red — exploring emotional themes through instrumental piano compositions. The project followed his signing with Decca Records France. In 2024, Tony Ann performed at the Montreux Jazz Festival. In 2025, Lang Lang invited Tony Ann to record a four-hand arrangement of his composition "ICARUS" for his studio album Piano Book II. In 2025, Tony Ann was nominated for Breakthrough Artist of the Year at the Juno Awards.

=== Emotions trilogy ===
In 2023, Tony Ann released a trilogy of extended plays titled Emotionally Blue, Emotionally Orange, and Emotionally Red. The project explored different emotional themes through instrumental piano compositions. The trilogy followed his signing with Decca Records France.

=== ICARUS ===
In late 2023,Tony Ann released the instrumental track ICARUS. In 2025, the piece was performed in a four-hand arrangement by Lang Lang alongside Tony Ann during the Beijing launch of Piano Book 2.

=== 360° (2025) ===
Beginning in 2024, Tony Ann released a series of monthly compositions inspired by zodiac signs. These works formed the basis of his studio album 360°, released on 21 February 2025.

== Collaborations ==
In addition to his solo piano work, Tony Ann has collaborated with artists across electronic, pop, and instrumental genres. He has released projects with Don Diablo, Wrabel, L.Dre, and the GRAMMY-nominated duo ARKAI, among others. These collaborations reflect his interest in bridging neoclassical piano with contemporary electronic and popular music formats.

== Reception ==
Tony Ann has been described by journalists as blending classical piano technique with melodic structures associated with contemporary popular music. In 2025, Les Échos referred to him as a "social media piano phenomenon," highlighting his ability to reach a broad international audience through digital platforms.

== Discography ==
=== Studio albums ===
- 360° (2025)

=== Compilation albums ===
- Emotions (Deluxe) (2024)

=== Extended plays ===
- Emotionally Blue (2023)
- Emotionally Orange (2023)
- Emotionally Red (2023)

=== Selected singles ===
- "ICARUS" (2023)
- "Carol of the Bells (Piano Version)" (2025)
- "Future Rain" (with Don Diablo)
- "RAIN (feat. ARKAI)" – Orchestral Version
