= Brockton Symphony Orchestra =

The Brockton Symphony Orchestra (BrSO) is a semiprofessional orchestra based in Brockton, Massachusetts founded in 1925 as the Brockton Orchestral Society. Described by the Boston Globe as "one of the region's classical jewels", the orchestra performs five or six concerts each year, including several masterworks concerts and an annual Holiday Pops Concert at venues in Brockton including the Buckley Center for the Performing Arts, Christ Congregational Church, and Brockton High School. In the 1970s, the orchestra also produced original operas and ballets, a tradition it revived with its 2025 production of Carmen. Contemporary works which have been commissioned and premiered by the orchestra include Gardner Read's Vernal Equinox (1955), Beth Denisch's Golden Fanfare (1998), and Thomas Oboe Lee's Sounds of The Islands (2005).

The orchestra is currently music directed by John Masko, who has served since 2023. Its board chair is Susan Caplan. Clarinetist and conductor Jonathan Cohler served as the orchestra's musical director from 1996 to 2006, and James Orent served as music director from 2007 until his death in 2021.

== Vasconcellos Youth Competition ==
The Brockton Symphony Orchestra also hosts the annual Vasconcellos Youth Competition, offering $1500 in prizes every year to instrumentalists under the age of 18. Winners are invited to play a concerto with the Brockton Symphony Orchestra. Past Winners include Miki Nagahara, Winston Huang, Jaclyn Freshman, Kristhyan Benitez, and Meihui An.

== Members ==
The following is the list of instrumentalists as of the Brockton Symphony Orchestra 2023–2024 season.

Name	Section	Chair
Janny Joo	Violin I	Mark Finklestein Chair
Zenas Hsu	Violin I	
Donna Culley	Violin I	John D. Martin Chair
Tudor Dornescu	Violin I	
Joy Garmaise-Yee	Violin I	
Viridiana Hernandez Villa	Violin I	
Kathleen Jara	Violin I	
Diane Hartung	Violin I	
Jonathan K.S So	Violin I	
Jo Manning-Souza	Violin I	
Gigi Turgeon	Violin I	
Laura-Marie Tusi	Violin I	
Ali You	Violin I	
Christine Warren	Violin I	
Betsy Hinkle	Violin II	Marcia Lindsay Chair
Lily Apolloni	Violin II	
Karen Grant	Violin II	
Maureen Jardin	Violin II	
Joshua Lennox	Violin II	
Heather Luhn	Violin II	
Nareh Mkrtschjan	Violin II	
Allison Patton	Violin II	
Carol Rankin	Violin II	
Sam Ruest	Violin II	
Sara Weir	Violin II	
Isaiah Chapman	Violin II	
Stephanie Billingham	Viola	
Stephanie Burns	Viola	
Patricia Chane	Viola	
Arjun Mudan	Viola	
Carly Rockenhauser	Viola	
Roselie Samter	Viola	
Cassandra Sulbarán	Viola	
Julie Reimann	Viola	
Caroline Walter Hine	Cello	
Christelle Alcindor	Cello	
Tara Chambers	Cello	
Angelina Donahue	Cello	
James Hardiman	Cello	
Howard Katz	Cello	
Macaulley Whitlock	Cello	
Amitabh Goswami	Bass	
Carlos Sulbarán	Bass	
Carlos Yepes	Bass	
Susan Caplan	Flute/Piccolo	Caplan Family Chair
Carolyn Baughman	Flute/Piccolo	
Lorrie Hassan	Flute/Piccolo	
Mark Finklestein	Oboe/English Horn	Kenneth R. Feinberg Chair
Melanie Hayn	Oboe/English Horn	Mark Finklestein Chair
Lori Hagborg	Oboe/English Horn	
Torben Hansen	Clarinet	Evelyn Chamberlin Chair
Jeffrey Lichenstein	Clarinet	
Karen Sanborn	Bass Clarinet & Saxophone	
Mary Jo Running	Saxophone	
Debbie Chen	Bassoon	
Robert Gemmell Jr.	Bassoon	
Jessica Young	Horn	Carol F. Bedard Chair
Erik Svenson	Horn	
Rachel Daly	Horn	
Samuel Koeck	Horn	
Wayne King	Trumpet	
Spencer Aston	Trumpet	
Joseph Donohue	Trumpet	
John Schuller	Trumpet	
Sydney Alfano	Trumpet	
Nic Dion	Trombone	
Thomas Williams	Trombone	
Donald Running	Bass Trombone	
Jordan Oliveira	Tuba	
Carol Chaffee	Piano	
Eve Budnick	Piano	
Bryan Round	Percussion	
Chris Boyd	Percussion	
Angelina Savoie	Harp	
