= Cleveland Institute of Music =

Private music conservatory in Ohio, US

Coordinates: 41°30′43.08″N 81°36′32.7″W

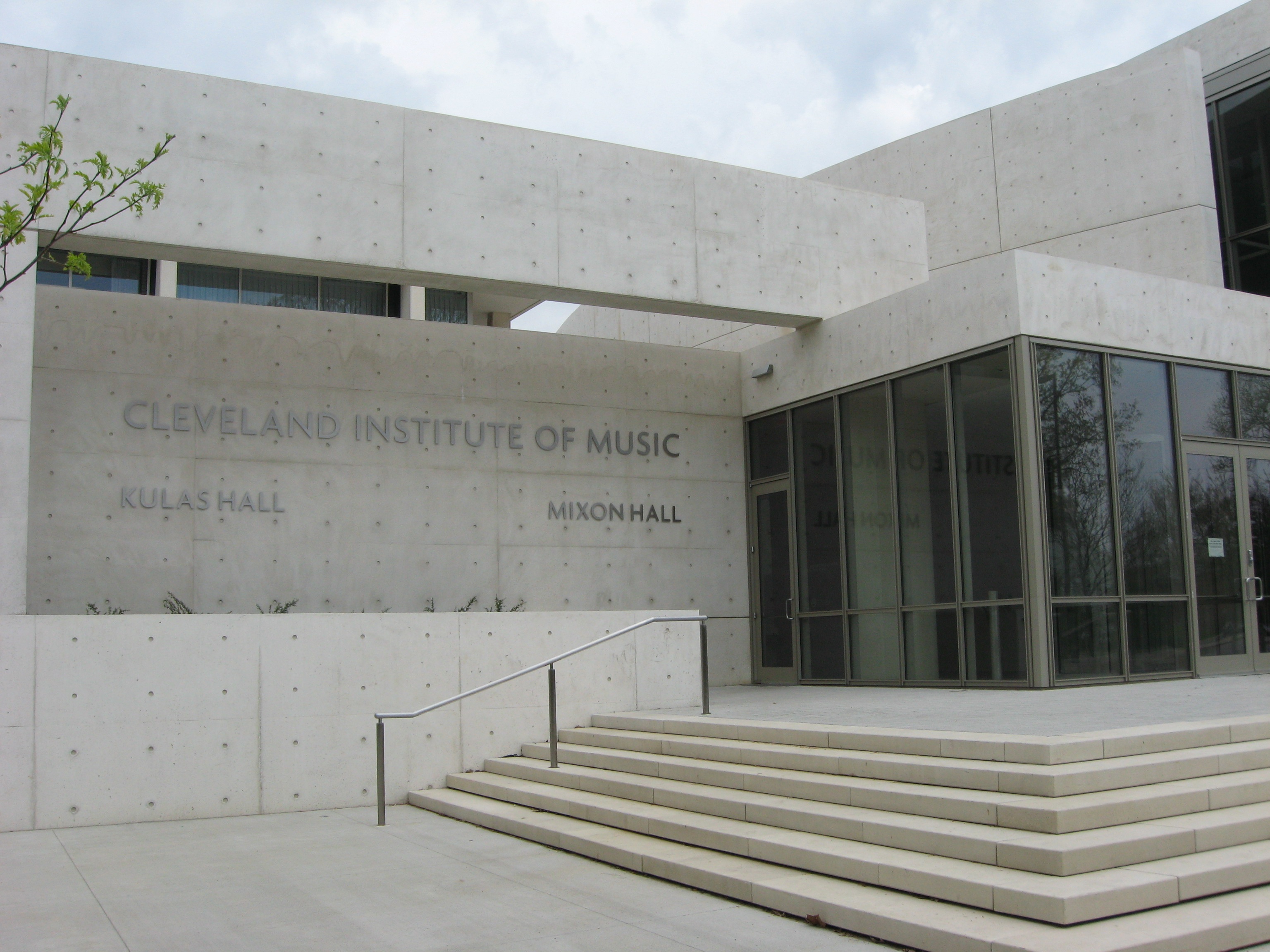
- CIM's East Boulevard entrance
- Type: Private music conservatory
- Established: 1920; 106 years ago
- Affiliations: Case Western Reserve University
- Endowment: $64.06 million (2024)
- President: Paul Hogle
- Faculty: 185
- Students: 325
- Location: Cleveland, Ohio, United States
- Website: www.cim.edu

The Cleveland Institute of Music (CIM) is a private music conservatory in Cleveland, Ohio. The school was founded in 1920 by a group of supporters led by Martha Bell Sanders and Mary Hutchens Smith, with Ernest Bloch serving as its first director. CIM enrolls 325 students in the conservatory and approximately 1,500 students in the preparatory and continuing education programs. There are typically about 100 openings per year for which 1,000-1,200 prospective students apply.

Many members of The Cleveland Orchestra serve as faculty at CIM and CIM alumni can be found in major orchestras throughout the United States and the world. In 2024, faculty voted, 56 to 25, to join the American Federation of Musicians.

== Campus ==
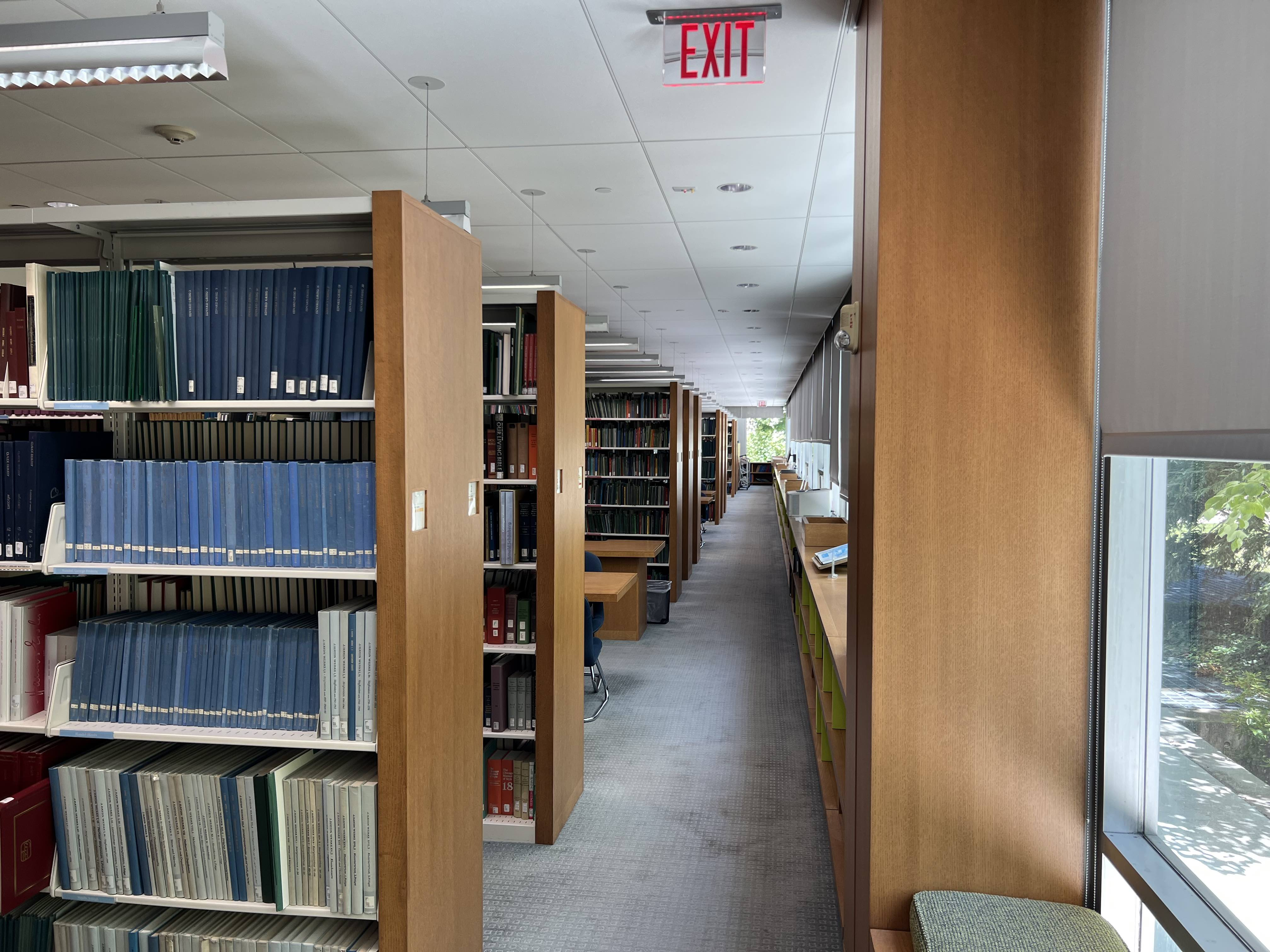
Robinson Music Library at the Cleveland Institute of Music.

CIM is located in the University Circle, a four-mile square neighborhood on the east side of Cleveland.

Opened in 1961, the main building houses teaching studios, practice rooms, recital halls, a music library, and classrooms. The building was expanded in 2007, adding 34,000 square feet of space. This included a new entryway and lobby, an expansion to the music library, a new recital hall, recording/broadcast suites, new practice rooms, and additional administrative offices.

CIM previously held a cooperative arrangement with nearby Case Western Reserve University, wherein CIM students had full access to many university amenities, including Case Western's world-class musicology and historical performance departments. In 2026, CIM made the controversial decision to break this arrangement. Only three weeks before the start of the fall 2026 semester, students who had already committed to the Institute of Music were notified that their tuition no longer included access to Case Western's academic course offerings, healthcare professionals, counseling and student life resources, or gym.

== Accreditation ==
The Cleveland Institute of Music is accredited by two agencies:

- National Association of Schools of Music
- The Higher Learning Commission

== Notable people ==
=== Alumni ===
- Tony Ann, Canadian pianist and composer
- Ryan Anthony, trumpeter
- Alan Baer, Principal Tuba, New York Philharmonic
- Benny Bailey, jazz trumpeter
- Mike Block, cellist, singer, composer
- Harriet Bolz, composer
- Zsolt Bognár, pianist
- Jim Brickman, pianist
- Nickitas J. Demos, composer
- David Diamond, composer
- Elaine Douvas, Principal Oboe, Metropolitan Opera Orchestra, Chair of Woodwind Department, Juilliard School
- Dennis Eberhard, composer
- Donald Erb, composer
- John Ferritto, composer and conductor
- Chuck Findley, brass player
- Aubrey Foard, tubist
- Grace Fong, Director of Keyboard Studies at Chapman University Conservatory of Music
- Jim Hall, guitarist
- Joseph Hallman, composer
- Thomas Hill, clarinet
- Wataru Hokoyama, composer
- Frank Huang, violinist
- Judith Ingolfsson, violinist
- Stefan de Leval Jezierski, horn, Berlin Philharmonic
- Megumi Kanda, Principal trombone, Milwaukee Symphony Orchestra
- Andy Kubiszewski, rock drummer, songwriter, and record producer
- Anton Kuerti, pianist, composer, and conductor
- Martin Leung, pianist
- John Mackey, composer
- Robert Marcellus, clarinetist
- Stephen Marchionda, guitarist
- Tariq Masri, Principal Bassoon, Alabama Symphony Orchestra
- Peter McCoppin, conducting
- Mildred Miller, mezzo-soprano
- Kermit Moore, cellist
- Judy Niemack, jazz singer
- Kam Ning, violinist
- Yuriy Oliynyk, composer and pianist
- Greg Pattillo, flautist
- Ann Hobson Pilot, harpist
- Kermit Poling, conductor and composer
- PROJECT Trio, chamber music ensemble
- Nikola Resanovic, composer
- Ben Richardson, cellist and US Olympian curler
- Joshua Roman, cellist
- Hale Smith, composer, arranger, pianist, and editor
- Mark Summer, cellist
- Irwin Swack, composer
- Howard Swanson, composer
- Jerod Impichchaachaaha' Tate, composer and pianist
- Gerardo Teissonnière, pianist and teacher
- Bross Townsend, jazz pianist
- Daniil Trifonov, pianist
- Jason Vieaux, guitarist
- Katharine Mulky Warne, composer, founder of Darius Milhaud Society
- Alisa Weilerstein, cellist
- John McLaughlin Williams, conductor and violinist
- Jasper Wood, violinist
- Jane Corner Young, composer

=== Faculty ===
- Sergei Babayan, piano
- Victor Babin, piano
- Greg Banaszak, saxophone
- Mordecai Bauman, voice
- Ernest Bloch, composition
- Margaret Brouwer, composition
- Sergio Calligaris, piano
- Alice Chalifoux, harp
- Yin Chengzong, piano
- Vinson Cole, voice
- Max Dimoff, double bass
- Andrew Földi, voice
- Maurice Goldman, voice
- Jamey Haddad, percussion
- Grant Johannesen, piano
- Ilya Kaler, violin
- Yolanda Kondonassis, harp
- Edwin Arthur Kraft, organ
- William Kroll, violin
- Jaime Laredo, violin
- Denoe Leedy, piano
- Arthur Loesser, piano, writer
- Malcolm Lowe, violin
- John Mack, oboe
- Tito Muñoz, conducting
- Antonio Pompa-Baldi, piano
- Quincy Porter, composition
- Sharon Robinson, cello
- Bernard Rogers, composition
- Beryl Rubinstein, piano and composition
- David Shifrin, clarinet
- Leonard Shure, piano
- Eleanor Steber, voice
- Yi-Kwei Sze, voice
- Gerardo Teissonnière, piano
- Nevada Van der Veer, voice
- Robert Vernon, viola
- Jason Vieaux, guitar
- Vitya Vronsky, piano
- Todd Wilson, organ
- Ivan Zenaty, violin
