= Music from Salem =

Chamber music festival in New York, United States

Music from Salem is a chamber music festival in Washington County, New York. Founded in 1985 by violist Lila Brown and violinist Judith Eissenberg. The festival features a summer concert series at the historic Hubbard Hal in Cambridge, New York; free children's workshops at area libraries and open rehearsals at the Brown Farm in Salem, New York – birthplace of Music from Salem. In 2006, the cellist Rhonda Rider and the pianist Judith Gordon joined Music from Salem as artistic co-directors.

The festival fuses familiar classics with lesser known works and the repertoire often includes contemporary works by composers such as Lee Hyla, John Harbison, John Cage and John Adams. The Cambridge Commission, a community supported bi-annual award launched in 2002, has brought the works of Allen Shawn, Gernot Wolfgang, Karl Korte and Gerald Busby to Music from Salem audiences.

Festival performers have included Diane Walsh, Ida Levin, Robert Levin, Sanford Sylvan, David Krakauer, Gilad Harel, Peter Matzka, Mary Nessinger, Nina Tichman, Werner Dickel, Kari Ravnan, David Breitman, Ulrike-Anima Mathe, Kjell-Arne Jorgensen, Dongsok Shin and Delores Stevens.

Music from Salem is performed throughout Washington County at venues such as Pompanuck Farm Institute, Dionondehowa Wildlife Sanctuary and School and Salem Art Works. Off–season programming includes winter and spring concerts and, in early June, the acclaimed Cello Seminar for young professional musicians.
