= Clarinet Concerto (Copland) =

Musical composition by Aaron Copland

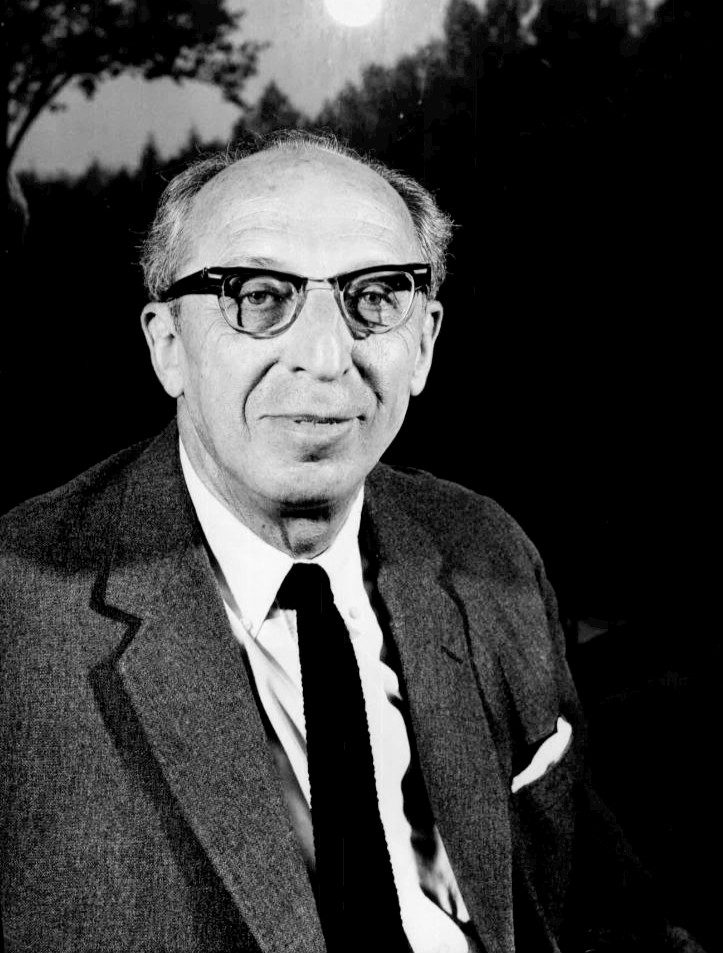
Aaron Copland in 1962

Aaron Copland's Clarinet Concerto (also referred to as the Concerto for Clarinet and String Orchestra or the Concerto for Clarinet, Strings, Harp and Piano) was written between 1947 and 1949, although a first version was available in 1948. The concerto was later choreographed by Jerome Robbins for ballet The Pied Piper (1951).

== History ==
=== Composition ===
Soon after Copland composed his Symphony No. 3, in 1947 jazz clarinetist Benny Goodman commissioned him to write a concerto for clarinet. Goodman told Copland biographer Vivian Perlis:

I made no demands on what Copland should write. He had completely free rein, except that I should have a two-year exclusivity on playing the work. I paid two thousand dollars and that's real money. At the time there were not too many American composers to pick from... We never had much trouble except for a little fracas about the spot before the cadenza where he had written a repetition of some phrase. I was a little sticky about leaving it out—it was where the viola was the echo to give the clarinet a cue. But I think Aaron finally did leave it out... Aaron and I played the concerto quite a few times with him conducting, and we made two recordings"

Copland was in Rio de Janeiro in 1947 as a lecturer and conductor. While there he made many drafts of the concerto. On August 26, 1948, Copland wrote that the concerto was still "dribbling along". A month later, he wrote in a letter that the piece was almost done. On December 6, 1948, he wrote to composer Carlos Chávez that he had completed the composition and was pleased with the result.

Copland accepted a commission from conductor Serge Koussevitzky to arrange the concerto's first movement as an Elegy for Strings, to be performed by the Boston Symphony. However, in a letter to Koussevitzky dated August 29, 1950, Copland backed away from the commission. The composer explained that, after further thought, he believed that performing an arrangement of the first movement by itself "takes away from the integrity of the Concerto as I originally conceived it, and I am basically unwilling to do that". Copland was also concerned, he wrote, that a performance of the concerto's first movement by itself when the concerto still had not been performed—Goodman repeatedly postponed his premier of the piece—might be misperceived by the public as expressing doubt about the quality of the concerto's second movement. He proposed a different way to satisfy his commitment for an elegy.

=== Performances ===
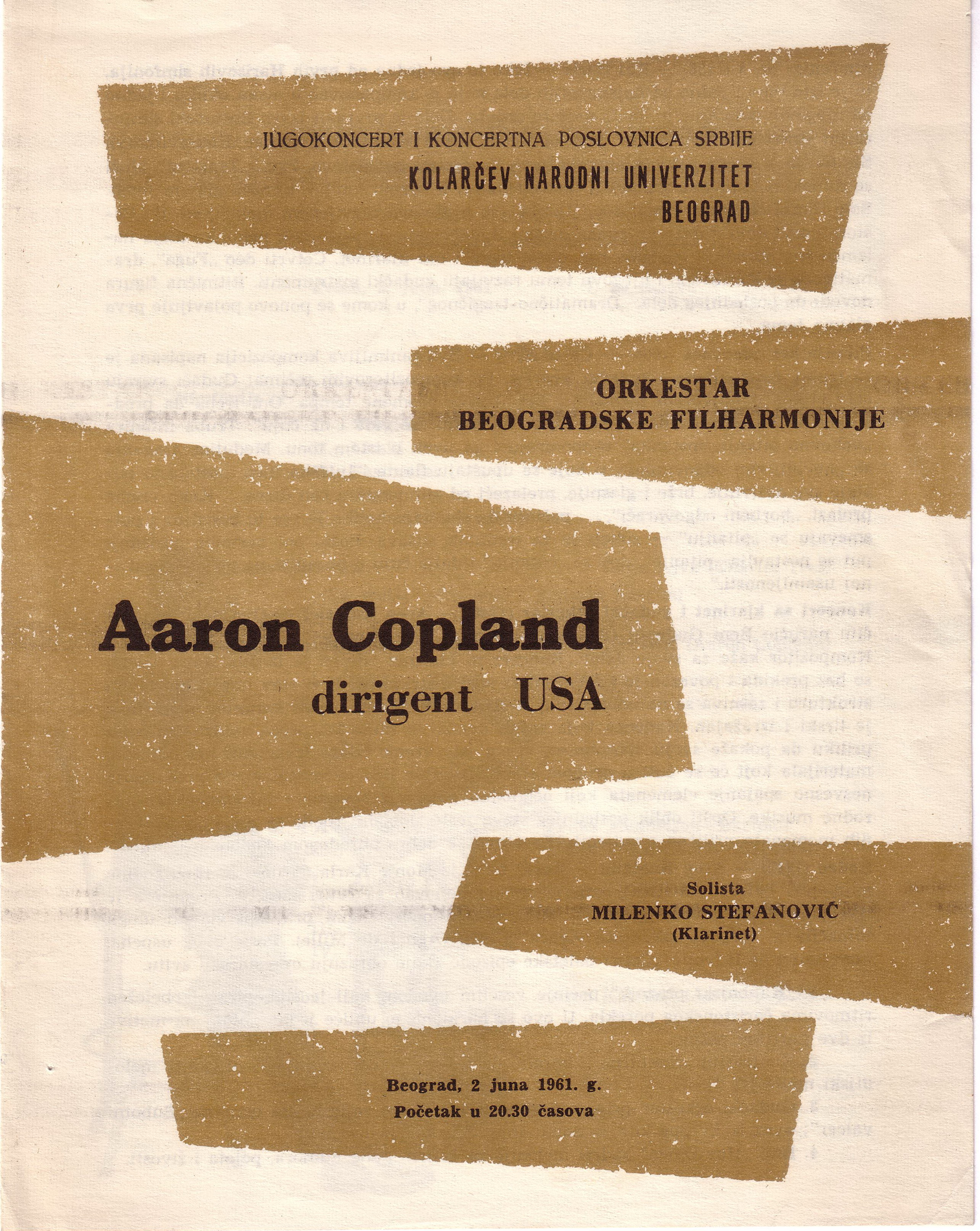
The Copland Clarinet Concerto performed in Belgrade, Yugoslavia, on June 2, 1961, by Milenko Stefanović and Belgrade Philharmonic Orchestra, conducted by Aaron Copland

Benny Goodman premiered the concerto on an NBC radio broadcast with the NBC Symphony Orchestra conducted by Fritz Reiner, on November 6, 1950.

Some claim this performance, however, was not the world premiere, and attribute the world premiere to Ralph McLane and the Philadelphia Orchestra under Eugene Ormandy because this performance on November 28, 1950 was the first "public performance". In any case it was the first public performance of the Concerto in New York.

This November 28, 1950 performance —probably just beyond the end of the two-year exclusivity— had been scheduled by Copland to increase pressure on Goodman, since he kept on putting off the first performance. A recording of the first radio performance by Goodman, with the NBC Symphony Orchestra under the baton of Fritz Reiner is available on CD on the Legend music label (see below).

The concerto quickly established itself as a standard piece in the clarinet repertoire. Since the performance by Benny Goodman, other notable performances include those by:

- Stanley Drucker and the New York Philharmonic with Leonard Bernstein
- Milenko Stefanović and the Belgrade Philharmonic Orchestra with Aaron Copland (Belgrade, June 2, 1961)
- Richard Stoltzman and the London Symphony Orchestra with Michael Tilson Thomas
- Paul Meyer and the English Chamber Orchestra
- Sabine Meyer and the Bamberger Symphoniker

However, one particular recording of note is the one with Goodman and conducted by Copland himself, which Aaron Copland considered to be his best recording ever.

== Style and structure ==
Copland incorporated many jazz elements into his concerto.

Mellers —Copland being representative of the American "Other"— links Copland’s affinity for jazz elements with the fact that “both Negro and Jew are dispossessed people who have become, in a cosmopolitan urban society, representative of man’s uprootedness.”

Copland himself acknowledged that his signature "bittersweet lyricism" like in the first movement of the Clarinet Concerto may have been influenced by his feelings of loneliness and social alienation over his homosexuality.

On the piece, Copland writes:

"The instrumentation being clarinet with strings, harp, and piano, I did not have a large battery of percussion to achieve jazzy effects, so I used slapping basses and whacking harp sounds to simulate them. The Clarinet Concerto ends with a fairly elaborate coda in C major that finishes off with a clarinet glissando – or "smear" in jazz lingo."

The piece is written in a very unusual form. The two movements are played back-to-back, linked by a clarinet cadenza. The first movement is written in A-B-A form and is slow and expressive, full of bittersweet lyricism. The cadenza not only gives the soloist an opportunity to display his virtuosity, but also introduces many of the melodic Latin American jazz themes that dominate the second movement.

The overall form of the final movement is a free rondo with several developing side issues that resolve in the end with an elaborate coda in C major. Copland noted that his playful finale is born of

"an unconscious fusion of elements obviously related to North and South American popular music (for example, a phrase from a currently popular Brazilian tune, heard by me in Rio, became embedded in the secondary material)."

This section was written specially for Benny Goodman's jazz talents; however, many of the technical challenges were above Goodman's confidence level, and the original score shows several alterations by Goodman to bring down higher notes, making it easier to play. The manuscript page of the original coda has suggested changes by Goodman in pencil, and the memo on top reads:

"1st version —later revised— of Coda of Clarinet Concerto (too difficult for Benny Goodman)"

Recently, performances of the restored original version have been given by Martin Fröst, Charles Neidich and Andrew Simon, amongst others. In the liner notes of the Chandos CD Composers in New York, Charles Neidich writes:

"...of that [1948] coda, complete with a tremendously brilliant clarinet part: cascading arpeggios which [Copland] decided were too difficult for the clarinet and which in the revised version he gave to the piano."

Only a few recordings of this version have been made (see the discography section below).

The concerto contains other notable references such as material from “The Cummington Story”, an "Office of War Information Documentary" (written in 1945) which sets the stage for the film's church-centered small town. It is the refugees’ theme from the unpublished film score that is used in the concerto.

== Discography ==
=== Recordings on LP ===
External audio
- You may hear Aaron Copland conducting the Columbia Symphony Orchestra with Benny Goodman in his Clarinet Concerto in 1963 Here on Archive.org

- Gervase de Peyer. Copland, Clarinet Concerto. Unicorn Records RHS314 ?, (p) ~1972
- Paul Drushler. Version with piano. Mark 3344
- Benny Goodman. Aaron Copland conducts his clarinet concerto. Columbia Masterworks MS 6497, (p) 1963
- Benny Goodman. Meeting at the Summit. Columbia MS6805 ?, (p) ?

=== Recordings available on CD ===
- Laura Ardan. American Classics. Naxos 8.559069, 2001, (p) 2001
- Dimitri Ashkenazy. Concertos For Clarinet. PAN Classics 510 107, 1998, (p) 1998
- Reto Bieri. Portrait. PAN Classics 510 144, 2001, (p) 2001
- William Blount, Music for the Theatre. Music Masters MM601621 1988
- Eduard Brunner. Hommage à Benny Goodman. Koch Schwann 3-1035-2, 1992, (p) 1992
- Philippe Cuper. Concertos For Clarinet & Orchestra. ADDA 581315, 1992, (p) 1993
- Karin Dornbusch. Barber, Copland, Ginastera. Caprice CAP 21591, 1998, (p) 1998
- Stanley Drucker. Copland: El Salon Mexico/Concerto for Clarinet and String Orchestra/Music for the Theatre/Connotations for Orchestra. Deutsche Grammophon 431 672–2 1991, (p) 1991
- Kim Ellis. The Music of Copland and McKinley. Navona NV5812, 2008
- Martin Fröst. Martin Fröst Plays Concertos Dedicated To Benny Goodman. BIS CD-893, 1997, (p) 1998
- Martin Fröst. Dance to a Black Pipe. BIS SACD-1863, 2011, (p) 2011 (with both, original and revised, codas)
- Benny Goodman. Benny Goodman Collector's Edition. CBS MK42227, 1986, (p) 1986
- Benny Goodman. Reiner & Goodman. Legend LGD122, 1951, (p) 1994
- Gary Gray. Clarinet Concertos. Centaur CRC 2212, 1994, (p) 1994
- Janet Hilton. Clarinet Concertos. CHAN 8618, 1988, (p) 1988
- Sharon Kam. American Classics. Teldec Classics 8573-88482-2 2002, (p) 2002
- Sharon Kam. I got Rhythm, American Classics. Teldec Classics WPCS-11205 (8573-88482-2) 2002, (p) 2002
- George MacDonald. Clarinet Concertos.... ASV CD DCA568, 1986, (p) 1986
- Jon Manasse. 3 Clarinet Concertos. XLNT Music CD-18011, 2004, (p) 2004
- Jon Manasse. Sounds of America. Recursive Classics RC3139941, (p) 2021
- Paul Meyer. Clarinet Concertos. DENON CO-75289, 1993, (p) 1993
- Sabine Meyer. Homage To Benny Goodman. EMI Classics 7243 5 56652 2 5, 1998, (p) 1998
- Arne Møller. Et Clarinet portræt. Classico CLASSCD514, 1964, (p) 2004
- Charles Neidich. Composers in New-York. Chandos digital CHAN 9848, 2000, (p) 2000
- Andreas Ottensamer. Portraits. The Clarinet Album. Deutsche Grammophon 00289 481 0131, 2012, (p) 2013
- Daniel Pacitti. Works For Clarinet. Agora Musica AG026, 1995
- Ludmila Peterková. Scaramouche And Other Concertos For Clarinet. Supraphon SU 3348-2031, 1997, (p) 1997
- Robert Plane. American Landmarks. BBC MM205 DDD 2001, (p) 2001
- David Shifrin. Clarinet Concerto.... EMI CDC 7 49095 2, 1989, (p) 1989
- Robert Spring. American Jazz Concertos. Summit Records DCD-1019, 2003, (p) 2003
- Richard Stoltzman. Copland-Corigliano, Clarinet Concertos. RCA Victor Red Seal RD 87762, 1988, (p) 1988
- Richard Stoltzman. Copland Clarinet Concerto. RCA Victor Red Seal 09026 61790 2, 1993, (p) 1993
- Richard Stoltzman. The Essential Clarinet. RCA 61360, 1988, (p) 1992
- Sarah Williamson. Copland Clarinet Concerto. Somm New Horizons. B003L1N4PI, 2010
- Andrzej Wojciechowski. A Tribute to Benny Goodman. DUX 1266, 2016

=== Recordings of the original 1948 version ===
- Reto Bieri. Portrait. PAN Classics 510 144, 2001, (p) 2001
- Charles Neidich. Composers in New-York. Chandos digital CHAN 9848, 2000, (p) 2000
- Martin Fröst. Dances to a Black Pipe. BIS-SACD-1863, 2011, (p) 2011

=== Recording of performance directed by the composer ===
- Benny Goodman. Benny Goodman Collector's Edition. CBS MK42227, 1986, (p) 1986

=== Recording of the first radio performance ===
- Benny Goodman. Reiner & Goodman. Legend LGD122, 1951, (p) 1994

=== Recordings available on DVD ===
- Richard Stoltzman. Concerto. RCA Victor BVBC-34002, 1993, (p) 1993
