= Howard Swanson =

American classical composer

Howard Swanson (August 18, 1907 – November 12, 1978) was an American composer. Swanson studied at the Cleveland Institute of Music and was then taught by Nadia Boulanger in Paris. He received fellowships, awards and prizes. His preference was for linear construction and lyrical works with subtle tonal centers. He was born in Atlanta, Georgia and died in New York City.

Swanson’s Symphony no. 2 (a.k.a. the "Short Symphony") was acclaimed in its premier by the NY Philharmonic under Dimitri Mitropoulos in 1950 and at the Edinburgh International Festival in 1951, was also judged the best work of the season by the New York Music Critics Circle.

In 1952 Swanson received a grant from the National Academy of Arts and Letters and a Guggenheim Fellowship.

Swanson notably set poems by Langston Hughes, starting with his 1942 setting of the celebrated Langston Hughes poem, "The Negro Speaks of Rivers", and consulted the poet regularly while setting his poetry. His individual song settings of the poems "Joy," "In Time of Silver Rain," "Night Song," "Pierrot," and "The Negro Speaks of Rivers" (performed by Helen Thigpen and David Allen in 1950) reflect his intimate acquaintance with the inner workings of Hughes poetry.

William Flanagan, reviewing three songs of Swanson, said, "They are authentic and in the best tradition of the song-writing art--sensitive, intimate, and evocative." Virgil Thomson said, "Howard Swanson is a composer whose work singers (and pianists, too) should look into. It is refined, sophisticated of line and harmony in a way not at all common among American music writers. His songs have an acute elaboration of thought and an intensity for feeling that recall Fauré."

Howard Swanson's 1951 piano-vocal setting of Paul Laurence Dunbar’s poem, “A Death Song” is used by bass-baritone Odekhiren Amaize as a dramatic, thematic soundscape and emotional underscore in his unabridged dramatic monologue recording of Frederick Douglass's historic speech, “What to the Slave is the Fourth of July?”
