= Judith Gordon =

American classical pianist and teacher

Judith Gordon (born 1963, Baltimore, Maryland) is a concert pianist and educator.

== Education ==
Gordon studied at Oberlin Conservatory and at New England Conservatory where she studied with Patricia Zander.

== New York debut ==
Gordon gave her New York recital debut on May 27, 1990 at the Metropolitan Museum of Art as part of the museum’s Introductions series. Bernard Holland, reviewing for The New York Times, wrote, "… Ms. Gordon does not have the dominating technique associated with major virtuosos, but she has character and she thinks."

In 1996, Gordon was named the Boston Globe Musician of the Year.

The Celebrity Series of Boston has presented Gordon frequently and she has performed regularly with Emmanuel Music. Her first Celebrity Series performance was part of the BankBoston Emerging Artist Series at New England Conservatory's Jordan Hall in a program which featured the world premiere of composer Martin Brody's eight-minute piece, (G) Corona, which was composed for the recital. With Rob Kapilow she explored music of Beethoven and Debussy in his What Makes It Great? programs in Boston, Los Angeles, and New York. Gordon has performed as a soloist with the Boston Pops, the Boston Modern Orchestra Project, the Pro Arte Chamber Orchestra, and the MIT Symphony.

== Chamber music performance ==
Gordon has performed with a variety of musicians, including soprano Lisa Saffer, mezzo-soprano Janice Felty, mezzo-soprano Lorraine Hunt Lieberson, tenor William Hite, and baritone James Maddalena; cellists Andrés Díaz, Rhonda Rider, and Yo-Yo Ma; violists James Dunham, Cynthia Phelps, Marcus Thompson, and Roger Tapping; violinists Rose Mary Harbison and Andrew Kohji Taylor; and oboist Douglas Boyd. She has also performed with the following ensembles: Imani Winds; the Jacques Thibaud String Trio; the Arianna String Quartet, Borromeo String Quartet, Lydian String Quartet, and St. Lawrence String Quartet; the Boston Chamber Music Society, Collage New Music, and Santa Fe New Music.

In a 1998 profile, Boston Globe classical music critic Richard Dyer quoted Gordon as saying, "Some of the most beautiful colors and textures on the piano emerge when you're not playing alone."

== Collaborations with composers ==
Gordon has worked with or had music written for her by Martin Brody, Peter Child, Alan Fletcher, John Harbison, David Horne, Lee Hyla, Libby Larsen, and Peter Lieberson.

== Teaching ==
Gordon has taught piano at the Massachusetts Institute of Technology, and served on the jury at the Fischoff National Chamber Music Competition. She performs and teaches at chamber music festivals including the Cape Cod (Massachusetts), Charlottesville (Virginia), Innsbrook (Missouri), Rockport (Massachusetts), Portland (Maine), Santa Fe (New Mexico), Spoleto USA (South Carolina), and Token Creek (Wisconsin) Festivals and Music from Salem (New York), where she is a co-artistic director. Gordon is a former Associate Professor of Music at Smith College in Northampton, Massachusetts.
