= Stephen Marchionda =

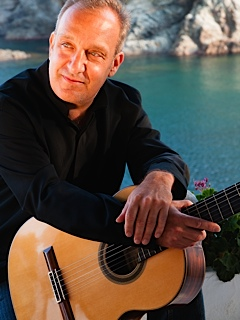
Stephen Marchionda in Girona, Spain

Stephen Marchionda is an Italian/American virtuoso classical guitar performer.

== Biography ==
Born in Albuquerque, New Mexico and raised in Denver, Colorado Stephen Marchionda began piano lessons at an early age. He later turned to the classical guitar after hearing Sabicas in performance. He was a protégé of famed pedagogue Ricardo Iznaola at the University of Denver and is a graduate of Yale University's School of Music and the Cleveland Institute of Music. He was affiliated with the Royal Academy of Music in London in 1991, where he received classes with the celebrated guitarist Julian Bream.

Stephen Marchionda has been featured at London's Wigmore Hall and New York City's Carnegie Hall (Aranjuez Series). Elsewhere in the USA and Europe he has been invited to perform at the Kennedy Center, Frick Collection, Aspen and Cheltenham Music Festivals; Lincoln Center, Trinity and Saint Paul Churches in New York, BBC Radio 3, Radio Nacional de España, National Public Radio, El Gran Teatro del Liceo de Barcelona and the Royal Opera House and many other important venues. He has given recitals throughout South America, including the Biblioteca Luis Ángel Arango in Bogota, Colombia.

Marchionda’s most recent recording on the MDG (Musikproduktion Dabringhaus und Grimm) in Germany is of his transcriptions of Sonatas and Suites by J.S. Bach. Other recordings on the MDG Label are the Sonatas by Domenico Scarlatti and piano works by Isaac Albéniz and Enrique Granados, have received exceptional attention and plaudits. In 2005 in a special collaboration with the tenor Philip Langridge, he gave the premiere recording of Nicholas Maw’s masterpiece "Music of Memory" for solo guitar, and his "Six Interiors for Tenor and Guitar“, (Chandos Records). An award winning recording that also included music of Benjamin Britten’s "Nocturnal, after John Dowland for Solo Guitar" and "Songs from the Chinese”. This recording was awarded recording of the month by both Gramophone Magazine and BBC Music Magazine. Other recordings appeared on the ASV Records, London.

Being strongly committed to performing and promoting contemporary music, Marchionda has premiered many new works, including those written for him by several internationally renowned composers, including Sir Harrison Birtwistle's “Today Too” and Nicholas Maw's “Tango from Sophie’s Choice“. Active in concertos with orchestra and chamber music, Marchionda has appeared in special collaborations in concert and recordings with famed British tenor Philip Langridge, mezzo-soprano Angelika Kirchschlager, the London Sinfonietta, Kurt Streit, Sebastian Bell amongst others. Recently exploring a popular mix with cantaoras (flamenco singer) Rocío Márquez and Marina Heredia.

Stephen Marchionda has won many international prizes including the Guitar Foundation of America's International Solo, the Segovia International, and the Manuel de Falla. Holding both American and Italian citizenships, Marchionda has had homes in New York City, London, Granada and currently lives in Barcelona, Spain.
