= Andrew Simon =

American musician

Andrew Michael Simon (born February 17, 1963), an American clarinetist, is the principal clarinet of the Hong Kong Philharmonic Orchestra.

He made his debut in the Carnegie Hall Recital (Weill) Hall in 1989, after winning the Artists International Young Musicians Auditions Clarinet Award.

He is noted as one of the few clarinetists that have been performing the original 1948 version of the Copland Clarinet Concerto. It was with this concerto that he made his Australian concerto debut in 2000, giving the Australian premiere of the original version of Copland's Clarinet Concerto with Marin Alsop.
