= Lynn Chang =

Chinese-American violinist (born 1953)

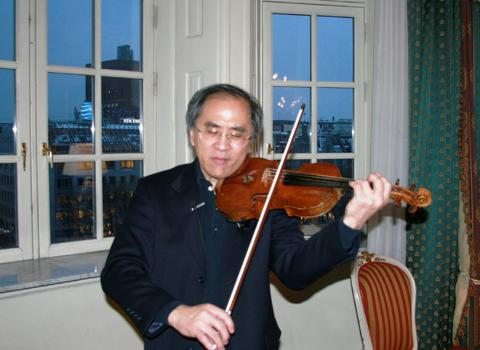
Lynn Chang

Lynn Chang (Chinese: 張萬鈞; pinyin: Zhāng Wànjūn), born 1953, is a Chinese-American violinist known for his work as both a soloist and a chamber musician.

Chang is a founding member of the Boston Chamber Music Society and is a faculty member at MIT, Boston University, the Boston Conservatory, and the New England Conservatory of Music.

== Education ==
A native of Boston, Chang began his violin study at the age of seven with Sarah Scriven and Alfred Krips of the Boston Symphony Orchestra. He continued his studies at the Juilliard School with Ivan Galamian, then received his bachelor's degree from Harvard University.

== Career ==
Chang has appeared as a soloist with many orchestras, including the Miami Symphony Orchestra, Utah Symphony Orchestra, Oakland East Bay Symphony, Seattle Symphony Orchestra, Honolulu Symphony Orchestra, Beijing Symphony Orchestra, Taipei Symphony Orchestra, and Hong Kong Philharmonic. He has also performed with such as Yo-Yo Ma and Dawn Upshaw. Chang has given many recitals throughout the United States and performed in such halls as Davis Hall in San Francisco, Weill Hall in New York City, and the Kennedy Center in Washington, DC. He makes frequent appearances at music festivals throughout the U.S., including the Killington Music Festival, Musicorda Festival, Wolf Trap, Great Woods Festival, Marlboro Festival, and the Tanglewood Music Festival.

Chang has collaborated with members of the Juilliard String Quartet, Guarneri String Quartet, Tokyo String Quartet, Cleveland String Quartet, Vermeer String Quartet, Muir String Quartet, and Orion String Quartet.

Chang has led a busy and successful teaching career for over three decades. His former students now perform in such orchestras as the Chicago Symphony, Los Angeles Philharmonic and the Metropolitan Opera Orchestra in New York. His former student Joseph Lin was recently named first violin of the Juilliard String Quartet. Chang also leads Hemenway Strings at The Boston Conservatory, a conductorless string chamber ensemble.

In 2008, Chang was elected to the Board of Overseers at Harvard University.

== Awards and honors ==
- Second prize at the International Paganini Competition.
- Winner of the Concert Artists Guild and the Young Concert Artists International Auditions.
- The Distinguished Leadership Award given by the Institute for Asian American Studies at the University of Massachusetts Boston.
- In 1995, Chang and Yo-Yo Ma performed the world premiere of Ivan Tcherepnin’s Double Concerto, which received the Grawemeyer Award for best new composition.
- On December 10, 2010, Chang was the solo violinist at the Nobel Peace Prize ceremony in Oslo, Norway, in honor of Peace Prize winner Liu Xiaobo.
- On December 4, 2011, Chang joined Pamela Frank, Sharon Robinson, Jaime Laredo and Emmanuel Ax to salute honoree Yo-Yo Ma at the Kennedy Center Honors
- In 2020, Chang was elected a fellow of the American Academy of Arts and Sciences.

== Recordings ==
In addition to being heard on CDs released by the Boston Chamber Music Society, Chang can be heard on Yo-Yo Ma's Made in America CD on Sony and Dawn Upshaw's Girl with Orange Lips CD on Nonesuch.
