= Harold Wright (clarinetist) =

- Born: December 4, 1926; Wayne, Pennsylvania
- Died: August 11, 1993 (aged 66) Marlboro, Vermont
- Occupation: Chamber musician
- Instrument: Clarinet
- Formerly of: Houston Symphony; Dallas Symphony; Boston Symphony Orchestra

Harold Wright (December 4, 1926 – August 11, 1993) was an American musician who was the principal clarinetist of the Boston Symphony Orchestra from 1970 to 1993.

== Early life and education ==
Wright was born in Wayne, Pennsylvania, and began his clarinet studies at age twelve. He continued his studies at the Curtis Institute of Music in Philadelphia as a student of Ralph McLane of the Philadelphia Orchestra.

== Career ==
Wright became a member of the Houston Symphony after graduating and in the following year became principal clarinetist of the Dallas Symphony. He went on to become the principal clarinetist of the National Symphony in Washington D.C. and played there until joining the Boston Symphony Orchestra in the 1970–1971 season. For seven seasons, he was the principal Clarinetist of the Casals Festival Orchestra. He performed, toured and recorded as a member of the Marlboro Festival with Rudolf Serkin and as a member of the Boston Symphony Chamber Players.

Harold Wright was a noted chamber musician and performed with all of the country's leading string quartets, including the Juilliard, Guarneri, Budapest and Vermeer Quartets. He was a regular guest artist with the Lincoln Center Chamber Players, the Mostly Mozart Festival and the chamber music concerts at the 92nd Street Y in New York City. A partial list of his recordings as a chamber musician include the Mozart, Brahms, Weber and Coleridge-Taylor Clarinet Quintets, Schubert's Shepherd on the Rock (with Benita Valente and Rudolf Serkin), Bruch Pieces for clarinet, viola and piano, Mozart Trio, Schumann Fairy Tales and Fantasy Pieces, Brahms' two Sonatas for piano and clarinet (with Harris Goldsmith) and Trio, Beethoven Septet and Octet, Dvořák Serenade, Schubert Octet, Stravinsky's L'Histoire du Soldat, Mozart Serenades in Cm and Bb (Gran Partita). As a soloist, he recorded the Mozart Concerto with the Boston Symphony Orchestra and Seiji Ozawa conducting. Wright taught at the Tanglewood Music Center, New England Conservatory and at Boston University.

== Personal life ==
Wright died in Marlboro, Vermont.
