= Tariq Masri =

American musician

- Born: 1973 (age 52–53)
- Genres: Classical/orchestral
- Occupation: Principal bassoonist of the Alabama Symphony Orchestra
- Instrument: Bassoon
- Member of: Alabama Symphony Orchestra
- Formerly of: Hofer Symphoniker

Tariq Masri (born 1973) is an American bassoonist. He is currently principal bassoonist for the Alabama Symphony Orchestra.

== Biography ==
In addition to being the current principal bassoonist of the Alabama Symphony Orchestra, he has also served as principal bassoonist of the Hofer Symphoniker in Germany. Masri holds a bachelor of music degree from the Cleveland Institute of Music, where he studied with David McGill for five years.

He also completed one year of graduate work at the University of Southern California, studying with Stephen Maxym before joining the Hofer Symphoniker. Masri has performed at numerous summer festivals including the Spoleto Festival and the Sun Valley Summer Symphony along with various orchestral musicians including members of the San Francisco, Saint Louis and Pittsburgh Symphony Orchestras.

As an orchestral musician, Masri has performed with the San Francisco Symphony as well as the Chicago Symphony Orchestra under various conductors including Pierre Boulez, Christoph Eschenbach, Daniel Barenboim, and Jeffrey Kahane.

Masri is currently on the music faculty of the University of Alabama at Birmingham and Samford University.

=== Career highlights ===
Principal bassoonist of the Hofer Symphoniker in Germany

Principal bassoonist of the Alabama Symphony Orchestra
