= Claremont Trio =

American piano trio

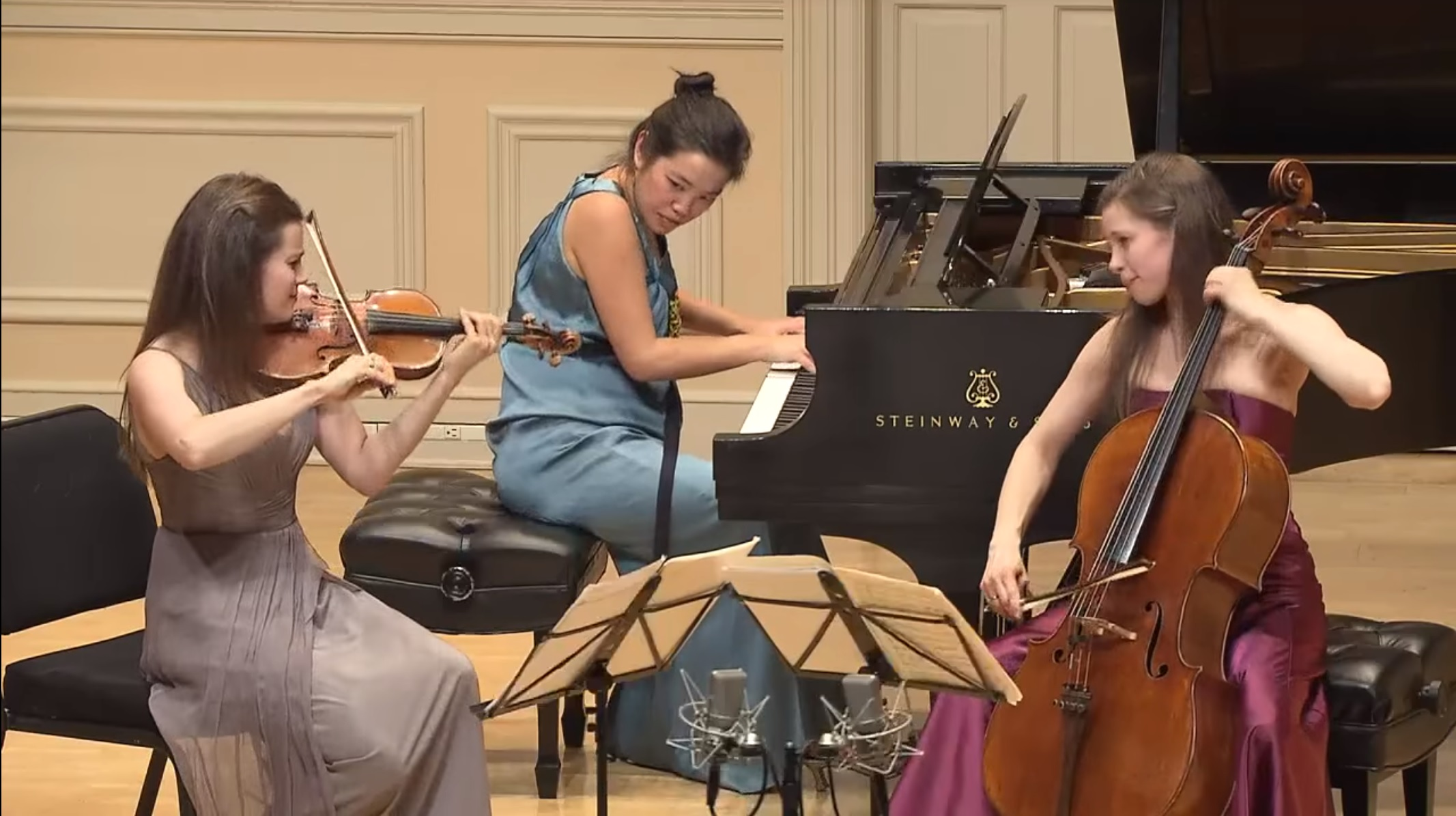
- The Claremont Trio (left to right: Emily Bruskin, Andrea Lam, Julia Bruskin) perform at the Coolidge Auditorium at the Library of Congress in 2015
- Occupation: Piano Trio
- Awards: Kalichstein-Laredo-Robinson International Trio Award; Young Concert Artists International Auditions
- Musical career
- Origin: New York City, New York, United States
- Genres: Classical
- Years active: 1999-present
- Labels: Arabesque; Tria; Ongaku; Bridge; American Modern Recordings
- Members: Emily Bruskin, Julia Bruskin, Sophiko Simsive
- Past members: Donna Kwong, Andrea Lam
- Website: claremonttrio.com

Claremont Trio is a New York-based piano trio including Juilliard School alumnae Emily Bruskin (violin) and Julia Bruskin (cello), and Yale School of Music alumna Sophiko Simsive (piano). The group was founded at Juilliard in 1999, and made its performance debut at the 92nd Street Y, on the Upper East Side in 2001 after winning the Young Concert Artists International Auditions that same year. In 2003, the trio also won the Kalichstein-Laredo-Robinson International Trio Award. They have performed at the Kennedy Center, Isabella Stewart Gardner Museum, Joe's Pub and the Mostly Mozart and Bard Music festivals.

== Discography ==
- 2004 Mendelssohn Trios Op. 49 & 66. Arabesque
- 2006 Shostakovich & Arensky Trios. Tria
- 2008 American Trios, trios by Zwilich, Kirchner, Bates, and Schoenfield. Tria
- 2009 Jonathan Cohler & Claremont Trio with Jonathan Cohler (clarinet), trios of Beethoven and Brahms, and sextet by Dohnanyi. Ongaku
- 2010 Beethoven & Ravel. Tria
- 2012 Beethoven Triple Concerto, Op. 56; Trio in E♭ Major, Op. 1, No. 1. Bridge
- 2017 Spheres: Music of Robert Paterson. American Modern Recordings
