= Thomas Hill (clarinetist) =

American clarinetist

- Genres: Classical
- Instruments: Clarinet
- Education: New England Conservatory of Music (BM, MM)

Thomas Hill is an American clarinetist known for his work as a soloist and chamber musician. He is currently the principal clarinetist of the Boston Philharmonic Orchestra and a member of the Boston Chamber Music Society.

== Education ==
Hill earned a bachelor's and master's degree in clarinet performance with honors from the New England Conservatory of Music. He also attended the Cleveland Institute of Music, where he studied under Robert Marcellus.

== Career ==
As a chamber musician, Hill has performed, toured, recorded and broadcast throughout the United States, Latin America, and Asia as a member of the Aeolian Chamber Players and the Boston Chamber Music Society. He has played on innumerable concert and festival series, and has been widely engaged as a soloist and ensemble performer in New York, Los Angeles, and Boston. Hill is the former principal clarinetist of the New Haven Symphony, the Long Beach Symphony, the Mainly Mozart Festival Orchestra, the Handel and Haydn Society, the Cascade Festival Orchestra and the San Diego Symphony. He is also a former member of the Kansas City Woodwind Quintet. Hill is also a former faculty member of the New England Conservatory, the Boston Conservatory, Longy School of Music, the Foundation for Chinese Performing Arts, New York University, the University of California Los Angeles, the University of Massachusetts Amherst, and the University of Missouri. He has been a member of the Boston Chamber Music Society since 1983.
