= Randall Hodgkinson =

American pianist

- Genre: Classical
- Instruments: Piano
- Spouse: Leslie Amper

Academic background
- Education: New England Conservatory of Music (BM, MM)

Randall Hodgkinson is an American classical pianist.

== Education ==
Hodgkinson obtained his Bachelor of Music degree with honors, Master of Music degree with distinction and artist diploma from the New England Conservatory of Music. He studied with Veronica Jochum, Russell Sherman and Leonard Shure.

== Career ==
He won the International American Music Competition in 1981 which was sponsored by Carnegie Hall and the Rockefeller Foundation. He was also a winner in the J.S.Bach International Competition and received the Tanglewood Music Center's Cabot Award in 1971. Hodgkinson made his European orchestral debut in 1985 with the Santa Cecilia Orchestra of Rome. Later in 1986, he made his formal New York recital debut at Alice Tully Hall. He has performed as a soloist with numerous orchestras including the Atlanta Symphony Orchestra, the Boston Symphony Orchestra, the Buffalo Philharmonic Orchestra, the Cleveland Orchestra, the Philadelphia Orchestra, the Concord Orchestra (Concord, Massachusetts), the Iceland Philharmonic, the Orchestra of Santa Cecilia in Rome, and had successful collaborations with Leonard Bernstein and Gunther Schuller. He was a featured artist on the Bosendorfer Concert Series, which aired on WNYC-FM in New York City. He has recorded for the Albany, Nonesuch, CRI, and New World labels.

Hodgkinson is an active performer of chamber music and is currently a member of the Boston Chamber Music Society, Boston Artists Ensemble, Worcester Chamber Music Society and the Gramercy Trio. He has performed chamber music at numerous festivals, including Blue Hill Festival (Maine), Bargemusic, Chestnut Hill Concerts (Madison, Connecticut), Seattle Chamber Music Festival, and Santa Fe Chamber Music Festival. In addition to his solo work, he also regularly performs the four-hand and two-piano repertoire with his wife, Leslie Amper.

Hodgkinson is on the faculty of the New England Conservatory of Music in Boston, the Longy School of Music of Bard College in Cambridge, and Wellesley College in Wellesley, Massachusetts.
