= Ralph McLane =

American clarinetist

Ralph McLane (December 19, 1907 – February 18, 1951) was an American clarinetist.

He was born in Lynn, Massachusetts.

McLane is best known for his tenure as principal clarinetist of the Philadelphia Orchestra from 1943 until his death in 1951. He is credited with giving the first public performance of the Clarinet Concerto by Aaron Copland at Carnegie Hall in New York City with the Philadelphia Orchestra and Eugene Ormandy on November 28, 1950. (Benny Goodman gave the premiere on radio with the NBC Symphony a few weeks earlier.)

== Discography ==
- Brahms - Trio, Op. 114. With Sterling Hawkins & Milton Kaye. Musicraft 15. Re-released on the Grenadillamusic.com label and also contain Reminiscences of McLane by David Weber & Ignatius Gennusa.
- Ravel - Introduction and Allegro. Columbia X167.
