= Joshua Roman =

American cellist (born 1983)

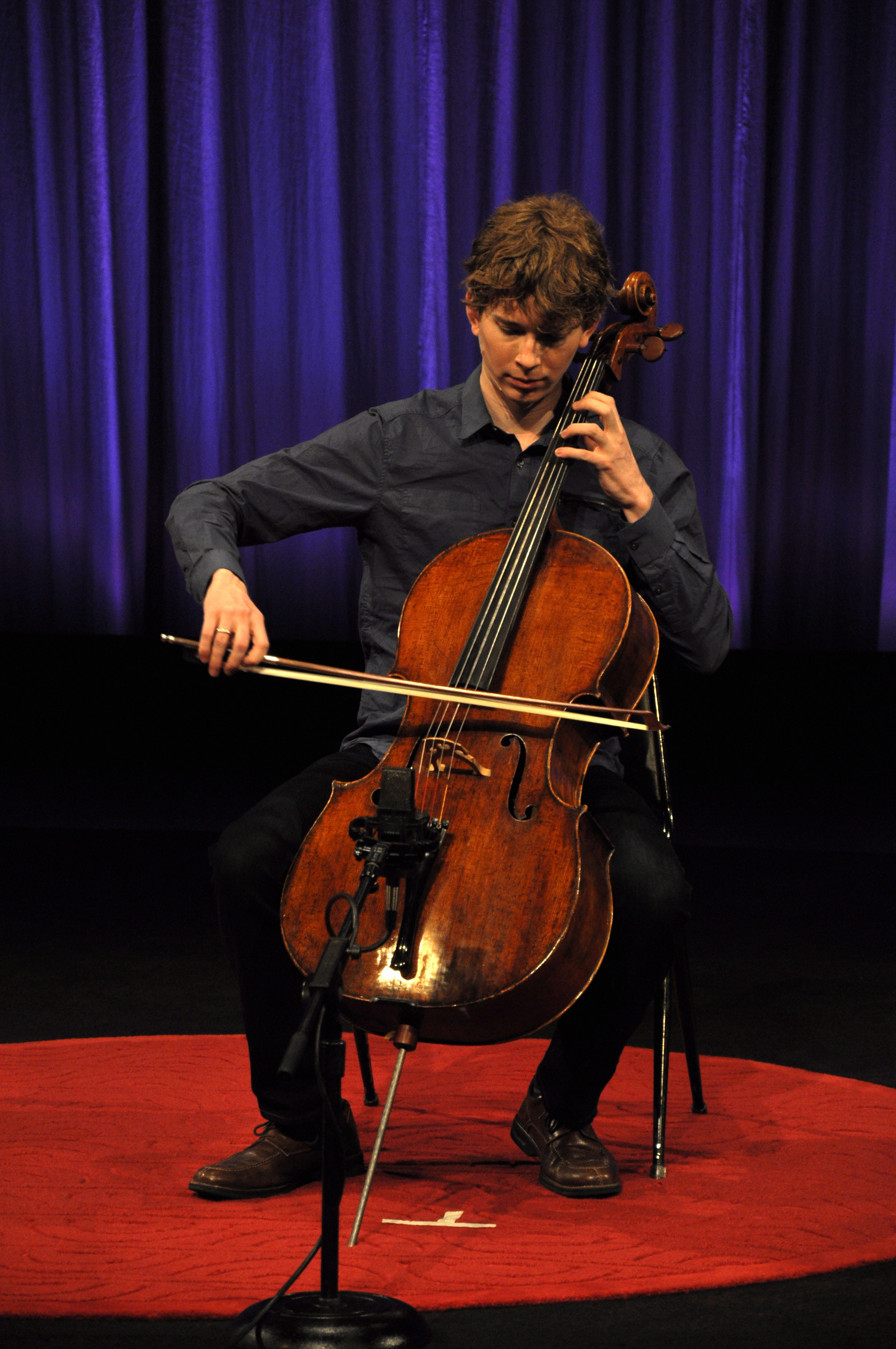
- Roman in 2011
- Born: December 16, 1983 (age 42); Oklahoma, U.S.
- Education: Cleveland Institute of Music (BM, MM)
- Occupation: Cellist
- Years active: 2006–present
- Employer: Seattle Symphony (2006–2008)
- Style: Classical
- Website: www.joshuaroman.com

Joshua Roman (born December 16, 1983) is an American cellist.

== Background ==
An Oklahoma native, Joshua Roman attended the Cleveland Institute of Music (CIM). There, he studied with Richard Aaron and Desmond Hoebig. Roman received his Bachelor of Music Degree in Cello Performance in 2004, and his master's degree in 2005. At the age of 22, Roman was appointed principal cellist of the Seattle Symphony orchestra in 2006, becoming the youngest principal player in the ensemble's history.

In 2006, the Seattle Post-Intelligencer called Roman's premiere performance an "auspicious beginning", noting that "Roman played with ease and confidence, the sound relaxed and singing, the phrasing shapely, the tone well projected seemingly without effort."

In 2007, Melinda Bargreen of The Seattle Times noted that Roman "played with heart-stopping beauty ... [and his] big, succulent tone and impassioned style perfectly suited the music."

In January 2008, Roman submitted his resignation as principal cellist at the conclusion of the 2007–2008 season to pursue a solo career.

Beginning in 2009, and going into 2012, Roman regularly posted videos on his YouTube channel where he played each of the 40 etudes from David Popper's High School of Cello Playing in what he called the "Popper Project".

== Awards ==
Roman has won prizes at competitions including the Klein, ASTA, Washington, Stulberg, NFMC, H-A Music Society, Corpus Christi, Kingsville, CIM, Cleveland Cello Society, and Buttram. He has performed as a member of the Cleveland Orchestra and soloed with a number of symphony and chamber orchestras, including the Cleveland Institute of Music Orchestra, the Wyoming Symphony, the Oklahoma City Philharmonic, and the Symphony of Southern New Jersey.
