= Donald Erb =

American composer

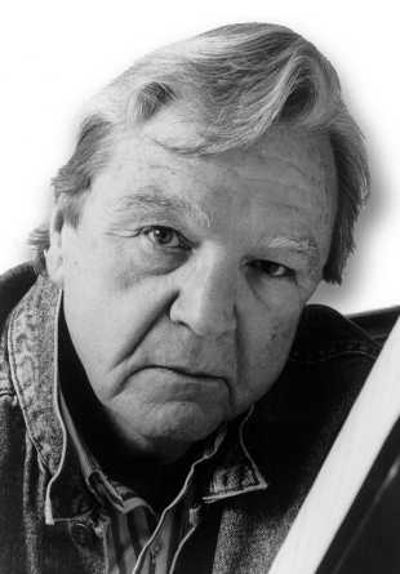
Donald Erb

Donald Erb (January 17, 1927 – August 12, 2008) was an American composer best known for large orchestral works such as Concerto for Brass and Orchestra and Ritual Observances.

== Early years ==
Erb was born in Youngstown, Ohio, graduated from Lakewood High School, a Cleveland suburb, and gained early recognition as a trumpet player for a local dance band. Following a stint in the Navy during World War II, he continued his career as a jazz trumpeter and enrolled at Kent State University, where he earned a Bachelor of Science degree in music in 1950. Three years later, he earned a Master of Music degree from the Cleveland Institute of Music. In 1964, Erb earned a Doctorate in Music from Indiana University Bloomington, where he studied with Bernhard Heiden.

== Honors and awards ==
In the course of his career, Erb earned considerable recognition. He received the 1992 Rome Prize and was composer-in-residence with the St. Louis Symphony Orchestra. He was Distinguished Professor of Composition, Emeritus, at the Cleveland Institute of Music in Cleveland, Ohio. He has received grants and fellowships from the Rockefeller, Guggenheim, Ford, Fromm, and Koussevitzky foundations.

For a list of Erb's notable students, See: List of music students by teacher: C to F#Donald Erb.

He died at his home in Cleveland Heights, Ohio, on August 12, 2008, at the age of 81.

== Selected works ==
- 1966 Concerto for Solo Percussionist
- 1964 Symphony of Overtures
- 1965 Phantasma for four musicians
- 1966 Diversion For Two (other than sex) for trumpet and percussion
- 1966 String Trio for violin, electric guitar and violoncello
- 1967 Reconnaissance for instruments and electronic sounds
- 1968 In No Strange Land for instruments and electronic sounds
- 1969 The Seventh Trumpet for orchestra
- 1983 "Prismatic Variations" for orchestra
- 1986 Concerto for Brass and Orchestra
- 1994 Changes
- 1994 Remembrances
- 1994 Sonata for Solo Violin
- 1995 Sunlit Peaks and Dark Valleys
- 1995 Sonata for Solo Harp
- "Autumn Music for Orchestra"
- "Christmas Music for Orchestra"
- "Harold's Trip to the Sky" for Viola, piano and percussion
- "Klangfarbenfunk I & II" for jazz group and orchestra
- "Percussion Concerto" for percussion and orchestra
- "The Hawk" for jazz group
- "The Treasures of the Snow" for electronics and orchestra
- "Trombone Concerto"
- "2 Milosci do Warszawy" for piano, clarinet, cello, trombone and electronic sounds
- String Quartet N. 1
- String Quartet N. 2
- String Quartet N. 3
- "Music for Mother Bear" for flute alone
- "Evensong" for orchestra
