= Ludmila Peterková =

Ludmila Peterková (born 16 September 1967 in Karlovy Vary, Czech Republic) is a Czech clarinetist.

From the age of 7 she started to play the recorder, but later switched to clarinet. From 1983 to 1988 she studied at Prague Conservatory; since the age of 27 she has been working there as a professor. In the course of her studies she won a lot of musical competitions, e.g. Mozart Competition at Bertramka in Prague. During her university studies at the Academy of Performing Arts in Prague she cooperated mainly with chamber ensembles. From 1992 to 1993 she studied at the Conservatoire de Paris under Michel Arrignon. Her collaboration with Prague Philharmonia as a solo clarinetist lasted from 1994 to 1997. Since 1998 she has devoted herself exclusively to chamber and solo performances. During her career she cooperated with a number of artists, including conductors Vladimir Ashkenazy, Jiří Bělohlávek, Gerd Albrecht, violinist Josef Suk, clarinetist Sharon Kam among others. She performs major parts of classic clarinet repertoire and has also made many recordings.

== Recordings ==
- W.A. Mozart: Quintet in A major KV 581 Studio Matouš 1991 MK 0002-2131
- B. Martinů: Chamber Music for Winds and Piano Studio Matouš MK 0007-2131
- In Modo Camerale-French Chamber Music Panton 1994 81 1291-2131
- O Kukal: Clarinettino op. 11 Musicvars VA 0050-2031
- W. A. Mozart, M. Bruch: Trios Supraphon 1995 SU 3014-2131
- Scaramouche and Other Concertos for Wind Instruments Supraphon 1997 SU 3348-2031
- Double Recital Midi Music Studio 1998 MM 0005-2531
- Stamitz: Concertos Lotos 1999 LT 0073-2131
- Compassion Angel Records 2001
- Clarinet Trios Supraphon 2000 SU 3481-2131
- Mendelssohn, Rossini, Bruch Supraphon 2001 SU 3554-2031
- Z. Fibich Supraphon SU 3487-2
- Playful Clarinet Supraphon SU 3901-2
