= Arianna String Quartet =

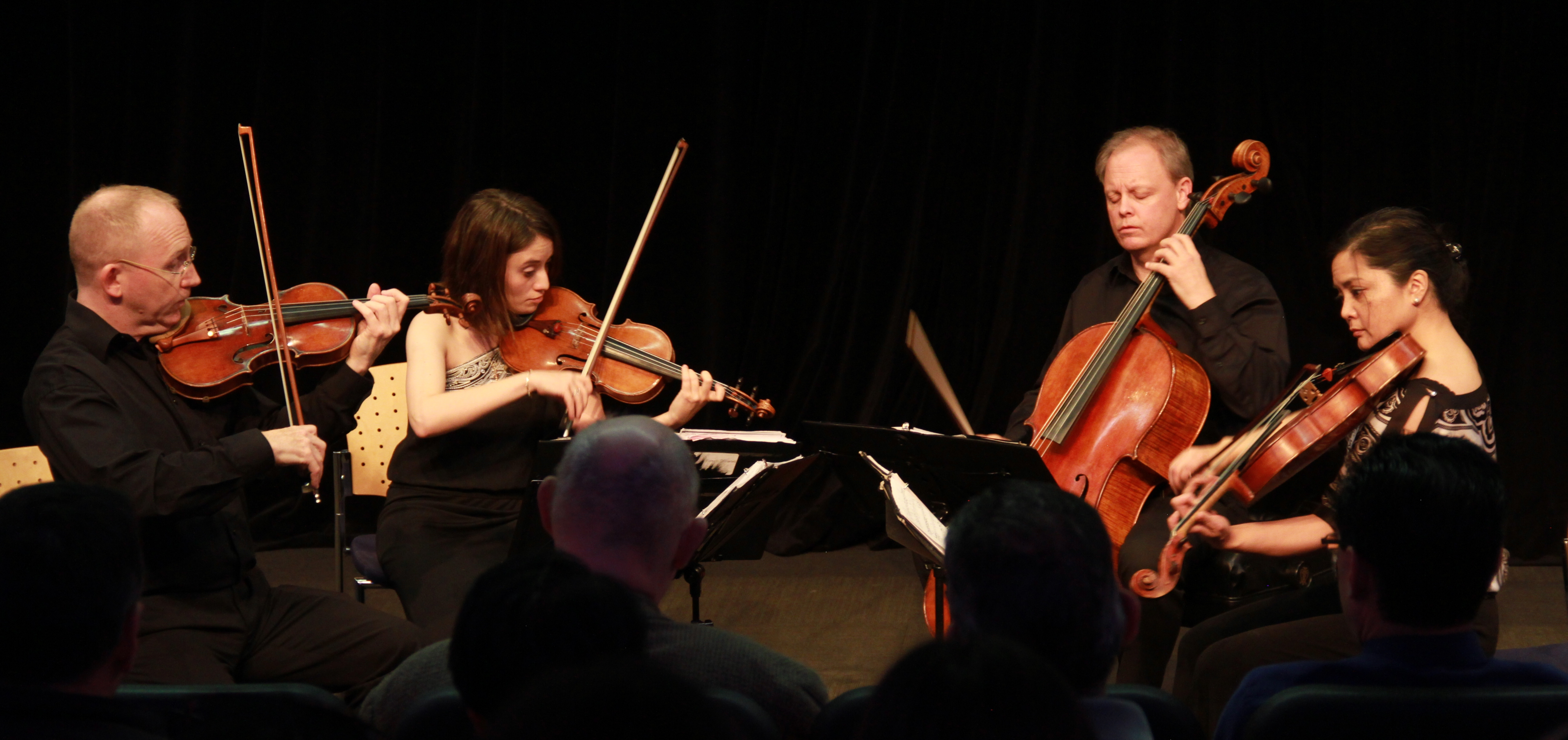
Arianna String Quartet in 2014

The Arianna String Quartet is an American string quartet that has been in residence at the University of Missouri–St. Louis since 2000. Formed in 1992, the quartet's current members are John McGrosso, Corinne Stillwell, violins; Joanna Mendoza, viola; and Kurt Baldwin, cello.

In 1994, the quartet won the Grand Prize at the Fischoff National Chamber Music Competition. It has performed throughout the United States, Mexico, Japan, Canada and France. Reviewing a concert given at Music Mountain Summer Chamber Music Festival in 2004, The New York Times wrote that the quartet "played like the good young group that it is", and the Chicago Tribune, reviewing a 2000 concert at the Chicago Cultural Center, wrote that the quartet "makes music with the tonal warmth, fastidious balance, and heightened communication skills of groups many years its senior."

The Arianna String Quartet has a long-term contract with Centaur Records and has also recorded for Albany Records and Urtext Digital Classics. For Centaur Records, the quartet has recorded Janáček's two quartets, Mozart's horn quintet (K. 407), G-minor piano quartet, and clarinet quintet, and Beethoven's early, middle, and late quartets. Reviewing the quartet's recording of Beethoven's quartets Opp. 59, 74, and 95, Jerry Dubins of Fanfare wrote: "I am prepared to state and defend my belief that these may just be the greatest performances of Beethoven's middle quartets in recorded history."
