= Vronsky & Babin =

Duo-piano team

Vronsky & Babin were regarded by many as one of the foremost duo-piano teams of the twentieth century. Vitya Vronsky (Viktoria Mikhailovna Vronskaya, 22 August 1909 – 28 June 1992) was born in the Crimean city of Yevpatoria, Ukraine. Victor Babin (Viktor Genrikhovich Babin, 13 December 1908 – 1 March 1972) was born in Moscow, Russia. They both died in Cleveland, Ohio, United States.

== Biography ==
Vronsky graduated from the Kiev Conservatory at the age of 13 and began a brilliant concert career as a soloist. She studied with Alfred Cortot and Egon Petri in Paris. She met Babin while both were studying with Artur Schnabel in Berlin. Babin also studied composition with Franz Schreker.

In 1931 they first went on tour as a piano duo. In 1933 they married in London.

Vronsky & Babin were introduced to American audiences through their recordings of the piano music of Sergei Rachmaninoff, who became their friend and mentor. Their recordings were issued by RCA Victor, Columbia, Decca and EMI. Despite a break from performance during World War II during which Babin served in the Armed Forces and Vronsky worked with war casualties in Washington, D.C. hospitals, the duo still managed to perform over 1,200 concerts in North America alone. In 1961, Babin became Director of the Cleveland Institute of Music, where both he and Vronsky served on the Institute's faculty.

Victor Babin also composed a Concerto for Two Pianos, which is in the repertoire of the Contiguglia brothers, Variations on a Theme of Purcell (cello and piano), Hillandale Waltzes (8 waltz movements on a theme by Johann Nepomuk Hummel, clarinet and piano), a song cycle Beloved Stranger, chamber music, as well as arrangements for two pianos of Stravinsky's Tango and the Waltz from Tchaikovsky's Eugene Onegin. His other works included a Capriccio for orchestra, a Konzertstück for violin and orchestra, a string quartet, a Sonata-Fantasia for cello and piano, the solo piano works Fantasia, Aria and Capriccio and Deux Mouvements dansantes, and for two pianos, he wrote Six Studies, Three Fantasies on Old Themes, and Three March Rhythms.

Babin died in 1972, and Vronsky continued to teach and perform until her death in 1992. Their pupils included Paul Schenly and Nohema Fernández.

Vronsky was awarded the rank of Chevalier of the Order of Arts and Humanities by the French government in 1972 and served as a judge for the Robert Casadesus International Piano Competition. Babin was awarded an honorary Ph.D. from the University of New Mexico.
