= Boston Chamber Music Society =

The Boston Chamber Music Society (BCMS) is an American organization of musicians located in Boston, Massachusetts and dedicated to the performance and promotion of chamber music. The organization performs works from the Baroque era to the present day. The organization is led by artistic director Marcus Thompson and managing director Wen Huang.

== History ==
BCMS was founded in 1982 by a group of music professionals in the Boston area. Originally called the Boston Conservatory Chamber Players, its founding members include such distinguished musicians as cellist and founding artistic director Ronald Thomas, cellist and founding executive director Bruce Coppock, violinists Stephanie Chase and Lynn Chang, violist Katherine Murdock, flutist Fenwick Smith, clarinetist Thomas Hill, and pianist Christopher O'Riley, among others. Current members of BCMS include: violist and artistic director Marcus Thompson, oboist Peggy Pearson, clarinetist Romie de Guise-Langlois, violinist Jennifer Frautschi, violinist/violist Yura Lee, violist Dimitri Murrath, cellist Raman Ramakrishnan, double bassist Thomas Van Dyck, and pianist Max Levinson.

== Recordings ==
To date BCMS has released six CDs. BCMS has also recorded music for compilation CDs on the Koch Int'l Classics label, Andante label, Music Little People label, Boston Centre label, and Pearl label. The first four of BCMS's CDs listed below were recorded under the Northeastern label, and the fifth and the sixth were under its own recording label.

- Brahms: Clarinet Trio in A minor, Op. 114 / Clarinet Quintet in B minor, Op. 115, recorded in 1990
- Brahms: Piano Trio in B major, Op. 8 / Piano Quartet in C minor, Op. 60, recorded in 1990
- Shostakovich: Piano Trio in E minor, Op. 67 / Cello Sonata in D minor, recorded in 1994
- Schoenberg: Verklärte Nacht, Op. 4 / Tchaikovsky: Souvenir de Florence, Op. 70, recorded in 1994
- Mendelssohn: Octet in E-flat major, Op. 20 / Enescu: Octet in C major, Op. 7, recorded in 1998
- Mozart: Trio in E-flat major, K. 498 "Kegelstatt" / Schumann: Märchenerzählungen, Op. 132 / Stravinsky: L'Histoire du Soldat, Bartók: Contrasts, recorded in 1999
