= Move Music Festival =

- Genre: rock; indie rock; indie pop; alternative; singer-songwriter; americana; hard rock; blues-rock; EDM
- Dates: April
- Locations: Albany, New York, US
- Years active: 2012–present
- Founders: Bernie Walters
- Website: movemusicfest.com

Move Music Festival is an annual music festival in Albany, New York. The event includes performances from bands across multiple venues as well as a music industry panel discussion. It features a diverse array of musical genres, including performers of alternative, indie, americana, hard rock, and EDM.

== History ==
Move Music Festival was founded in 2012 by Bernie Walters of Indian Ledge Music Group, a New York-based music production and management collective. Walters has stated that the motivation for the creation of Move comes from his desire to give Capital Region musicians an opportunity to showcase their talents:

I have been to numerous festivals over the past few years and noticed some problems in them that I thought could be done better. Then I started working in the Albany area... and felt a need for an event such as this to highlight the region's talent. Albany is situated at a great crossroads; it only made sense.

— Walters, Infectious Magazine

== Lineups ==
=== 2018 ===
The seventh annual Move Music Festival took place on Saturday, April 28. The industry panel discussion was titled "How To Make Yourself Heard." Panelists included SUNY Oneonta music industry professor Nancy Tarr, producer and recording engineer Joe Blaney, manager and producer David Bourgeois, talent manager and consultant Peter Iselin, promoter and manager Steve Theo, radio personality DJ Supreme (aka Rodney B. More), festival producer Ronan Daly, and producer and manager Lauren Wundrock. The festival's musical lineup included:

- Diet Cig
- Jouska
- C.K. and the Rising Tide
- Auguste and Alden
- Late Sea
- Jeremy James and the Villianeers
- The Avalon Hi-Fi
- Ryan Leddick Trio
- Aaron Rizzo
- Sorrow Estate
- School of Rock Albany
- Girl Blue

=== 2017 ===
2017's Move was held from April 27 to 29, with festival acts including:

- July Talk
- Sawyer Fredericks
- Jocelyn & Chris Arndt
- Mister F
- Alchemystics
- Shinobi Ninja
- Hard Soul
- Lucy (formerly Better by Morning)
- Space Carnival
- Council
- Kevlar
- Hasty Page
- The Energy
- Small Town Glow
- The Lateshift
- Wess Meets West
- Sun Voyager
- Bad Mothers
- Elephants Dancing
- Craving Strange
- C.K. Flach
- Band of Ghosts
- Molina
- School of Rock Albany
- BassBullets
- Y2J
- Ryan Leddick Trio
- Boy Go Fast
- The Rescott Renegade
- Bathrobe Robots

=== 2016 ===
The fifth annual Move Music Festival took place in 2016 from April 22 through April 24. The lineup featured the following acts:

- Skaters
- Arkells
- Giant Panda Guerilla Dub Squad
- Eastbound Jesus
- New Beat Fund
- Mirk
- Roots of Creation
- New Madrid
- Super 400
- The Big Takeover
- Titanics
- The Parlor
- Sirsy
- Turbo Goth
- Restless Streets
- The Walking Tree
- Trapped in Static
- Treehouse!
- Shane Guerrette
- The Ricecookers
- Chaser Eight
- Silverbird
- Danielle and Jennifer
- Girl Blue
- Jane Lee Hooker
- DJ Scooter
- Wyland
- Last Daze
- The Racer
- Vera Bloom
- Glazzies
- Black Mountain Symphony
- One Red Martian
- North & South Dakotas
- The Falling Birds
- Echo Bloom
- MAYVE
- The Flux Machine
- Hard Soul
- Builder of the House
- Hasty Page
- The Wild Feathers
- Space Carnival
- The Lateshift
- Gordon St.
- Lord Electro
- Blue Streak Blvd
- Basic Cable Preachers
- The Wonderbeards
- Let's Be Leonard
- Nine Votes Short
- Darling Valley (formerly The Accents)
- Revibe
- Flakjacket
- Ryan Leddick
- Vada March
- Humble Braggers
- US Lights
- Ampevene
- Food Will Win the War
- New Red Scare
- Sly Fox and the Hustlers
- Rechorduroys
- Good Fiction
- Tambourelli & Her Super Trips
- Barroom Philosophers
- Fort Rooster
- The Boobies
- Hoonch
- Dead Stars
- Carl Daniels
- What is Broken
- Nobody for President
- Band of Ghosts
- Shift the Paradigm
- Benjamin John
- Belle-Skinner
- Seth Adam
- Secret Beaches
- Kyle Albano
- The Rescott Renegade
- The Shelters
- Tommy Tommy Tommy
- Civil Savages
- Macero
- Jason Irwin
- Jae Sheen
- School of Rock Albany House Band
- Another Michael
- Ryan Lovelock
- Matt Butler
- The Furies
- Siobahn
- Kulture
- DJ Ryujin
- DJ Wolverine

=== 2015 ===
2015's Move Music Festival was held from April 24 to 26. The industry panel discussion's keynote speaker was composer and producer Tony Shimkin.

Performing acts included:

- Young Magic
- Locksley
- Shinobi Ninja
- Mirk
- Titanics
- Rustic Overtones
- Contact
- goodbyemotel
- Wild Adriatic
- Jocelyn & Chris Arndt
- Christina Custode
- Sirsy
- NOHC
- Heaf
- Shane Guerrette
- The Tins
- Anthony Fallacaro
- Mind Over Time
- Sheen
- The Accents
- The Racer
- Analog Heart
- Wyland
- Classy Mongrel
- Lemon Sky
- Eric David
- Breakfast in Fur
- Lynette Williams
- Justin Levinson
- Charlie Brennan
- Hard Soul
- Gusto
- The North & South Dakotas
- Dolly Spartans
- The LateShift
- The Unknown Woodsmen
- True Apothecary
- Olivia Quillio
- Squid Parade
- Mad Kings
- The Warp/The Weft
- Jordan Okrend
- Mark Schwaber
- My Body
- The Mysteios
- Flakjacket
- Space Carnival
- Skip Monday
- Better by Morning
- Fort Rooster
- Party Boat
- Myron James
- Baked Potatoes
- Slowshine
- Fiona Corinne
- Doctor Magnum
- Kayla and the Tellers
- Klozapin
- Candy Ambulance
- Foxanne
- Aisha Badru
- Reve
- Ampevene
- Nobody for President
- Carl Daniels and The Black Box
- The Further Unsound
- Jacob Restituto
- Lunar Pacific
- Joe Mansman and the Midnight Revival Band
- Take 2
- Kimono Dragons
- Gordon St.
- Many Trails
- Kyle Albano
- Melli & the Sparks
- Wolf Critton
- Lauren Hurley
- Good Fiction
- The Flam Flams
- Jason Irwin
- Steve Candlen
- Faint Little Things
- Cosmonaut Radio
- Blueprints of the Heart
- Father, Misty, and the Big Rock
- Brianna Nelson
- Xenolinguist
- Jennifer Haley
- The Montauk Project
- Andrew James Mirabile
- Ryan Leddick
- Brian Lapoint & the Joints
- DJ Scooter
- Bassbullets
- Comp3
- DRYV3R
- The Midnight Society

=== 2014 ===
The third annual Move Music Festival took place from April 25 to 27, 2014. The lineup included the following acts:

- Magic Man
- Black Taxi
- Sirsy
- The Big Takeover
- Bastinado
- Shinobi Ninja
- Margo Macero
- Titanics
- goodbyemotel
- Casey Desmond
- Engloria
- The Show
- Bong Hits for Jesus
- Stellar Young
- Predator Dub Assassins
- Dead Leaf Echo
- Lost in Society
- Trapped in Static
- AIUR
- Faith Ziegler
- King Django
- Black Eskimo
- Parker Ainsworth
- The Racer
- Rachel Ann Weiss
- Erin Harkes Band
- Black Mountain Symphony
- Twin Berlin
- Party Boat
- Digital Dharma
- Flora Cash
- The Slaughterhouse Chorus
- Linear North
- Vontus
- The Warp/The Weft
- Bridgette Guerrette
- Jocelyn & Chris Arndt
- Blackbutton
- Durians
- Fiction for Bandits
- Psymon Spine
- Bear Grass
- Beaked Whale
- Gusto
- The Quick and the Dead
- Sheen
- Palemen
- Deadpan Smile
- Scary Americans
- Boykiller

=== 2013 ===
The second annual Move Music Festival was held on April 27, 2013. The lineup included:

- Young London
- Sean Rowe
- Black Light Dinner Party
- Wild Adriatic
- Paranoid Social Club
- Mirk
- Echo and Drake
- Engloria
- AIUR
- The Tins
- Carnival Kids
- Musiciens Sans Frontieres
- Jordan White
- Lunatic
- January Jane
- Stellar Young
- Anthony Fallacaro
- The People's Blues of Richmond
- Avalar
- American Pinup
- Art Decade
- Margo Macero Project
- Retro Lake
- Planeside
- Hurrah! A Bolt of Light!
- Jocelyn & Chris Arndt
- Digital Dharma
- The 7th Squeeze
- Bern and the Brights
- ILL DOOTS
- Die Pretty
- Parker Ainsworth
- Bridgette Guerrette
- Wooly and the Mammoth
- Treehouse!
- Black Mountain Symphony
- Titanics
- Chris Dukes
- The Racer
- The Soviet
- John Brodeur
- Wolf Critton
- Ula Ruth
- Brown Bread and Von Holt
- Barons in the Attic
- The Big Takeover
- Satellite Hearts
- Young Cardinals
- Fairhaven
- True Apothecary
- Seth Adam
- Jensen Keets
- Chris Mahoney Project
- The Daydreamers
- Cosmal
- Hug the Dog
- BeCa
- Ch!nch!lla
- Last One Out
- Von Shakes
- Signal for Pilot
- Vontus
- Carl Daniels
- BLUEfiveone
- Matt Mango
- Sticklips
- The Blackboard Nails
- The Happy Problem
- Harbour Grace
- NWSPR
- Hijinx
- Erin Harkes
- Party Boat
- This Renaissance
- The Ameros
- Lauren Hurley
- Native Alien Tribe
- Snowflake
- Linear North
- Oogee Wawa
- Craving Strange
- Last Stand for Lucy
- Billy Keane
- Farewell Luna
- Revolving One
- Ballroom Jacks
- Playing with Sound
- The Lucky Jukebox Brigade
- Holly and Evan
- Oobleck
- Casey Dinkin
- Steve Babcock
- The Spectacular Average Boys
- Rick O'Disko
- Frank Palangi
- Molly Durnin
- Cats Don't Have Souls
- Laerlooper
- The Accents
- Barkeater
- electrik buddha
- Palemen
- Reckless Serenade
- River Eater
- Frankie Lessard
- The Elements
- The Greys
- Kristin Turo

=== 2012 ===
The inaugural Move Music Festival took place on April 21, 2012 with a lineup including:

- The Wombats
- Paranoid Social Club
- Black Taxi
- Mirk
- Zing Experience
- The Tins
- The Involvement
- Allison Weiss
- Wild Adriatic
- Jolly
- Find Vienna
- The Blackboard Nails
- Shout Out the Crowd
- Adam Ezra
- A Story Left Untold
- Days of Season
- NWSPR
- Brian Mackey
- Echo & Drake
- Six Stories Told
- Alex Montanez
- The Black Ships
- The Show
- The Aviation Orange
- Pete Herger
- SILVERSYDE
- Wolf Critton
- Runaway Dorothy
- Swear and Shake
- Around the World and Back
- Dead Leaf Echo
- Freak Owls
- Sticklips
- Skeletons in the Piano
- Charles Scopoletti
- My Name is Drew
- Die Pretty
- The City Never Sleeps
- Bern & the Brights
- The Blind Spots
- 7th Squeeze
- A Fire with Friends
- A Social State
- Jordan White
- The Few
- Cosmonauts
- The Chelsea Kills
- Harbour Grace
- The Happy Problem
- Last One Out
- The Red Lions
- Mercies
- Smittix
- Designer Junkies
- National Hotel
- Sound System
- Eastbound Jesus
- Olivia Quillio
- Evolutionary War
- Automatic Children
- Black Mountain Symphony
- Headband Jack
- Pat Tiernan
- True Apothecary
- Halliday
- Tony Lee Thomas
- The Ameros
- Brown Bread and Von Holt
- Erin Harkes
- The Spectacular Average Boys
- The Titanics
- The Lucky Jukebox Brigade
- Ula Ruth
- Synapse Factory
- My Favorite Fence
- The Getdown
- Last Remaining Pinnacle
- Glitter Freeze
- Wilbur by the Sea
- Burns and Kristy
- Playing with Sound
- Gracies Paris
- The Grand Design
- Jensen Keets
- Hug the Dog
- Pistola
- Hard Soul
- Kat Quinn
- Catching Cadence
- Carl Daniels
- Seth Adam
