= Wild Adriatic discography =

- Studio albums: 3
- EPs: 3
- Music videos: 5

Wild Adriatic is an American rock band formed in Saratoga Springs, NY in 2011. They released their debut EP, The Lion in 2011, followed closely behind by one more EP. Their first full-length album, Big Suspicious was released in January 2014. In May 2015, they released their latest EP Never Enough, which features a cover of Ain't No Sunshine by Bill Withers and their first single Strange Persuasions.

The trio consists of Travis Gray (lead guitar, lead vocals), Rich Derbyshire (bass guitar), and Mateo Vosganian (drums).

== Albums ==
=== Studio albums ===
| Year | Title |
|---|---|
| 2014 | Big Suspicious |
| 2017 | Feel |
| 2025 | Wild Adriatic (Self-Titled) |

=== EPs ===
| Year | Title |
|---|---|
| 2011 | The Lion |
| 2012 | Lock & Key EP |
| 2015 | Never Enough EP |

=== Music videos ===
- "Letter"
- "Strange Persuasions"
- "Lonely"
- "Mess Around"
- "The Spark"
