= Voice Coaches =

Voice-over production and training company headquartered in Albany, New York

- Company type: Private
- Headquarters: Albany, New York, United States
- Key people: David Bourgeois, President and Creative Director; Anna Bourgeois, CFO; John Gallogly, Senior Creative Director; Simone Stevens, Curriculum Director; Laura Nelson, Administrative Director; Brett Portzer, Studio Manager
- Services: production; recording; voice talent development
- Number of employees: 17
- Website: voicecoaches.com

Voice Coaches is a voice-over production and training company headquartered in Albany, New York. Company services include voice-over and communication training as well as voice-over recording and production. Voice Coaches is owned and operated by composer, producer, sound designer, and voice over director David Bourgeois and his wife Anna.

== Company History ==
Voice Coaches has been operational since the year 2000.

== Training ==
Voice Coaches provides services across the US and Canada, offering voice over production and communication training.

== Production ==
In addition to voice over training, Bourgeois and Voice Coaches have also produced voice over content for a variety of projects in commercial and narrative media as well as film and television, including the TLC series While You Were Out and HGTV's FreeStyle. Other production clients include Discovery Channel, WE tv, and Universal Music Group.

The company is currently working with actress Gabriella Pizzolo to produce voice over for a Nickelodeon series.
