= Baggage (disambiguation) =

Baggage is any number of bags, cases and containers which hold a traveller's articles during transit.

Baggage may also refer to:

== Television ==
=== Series ===
- Baggage (American game show), a 2010 dating game show hosted by Jerry Springer
- Baggage (British game show), based on the US version

=== Episodes ===
- "Baggage" (The Americans)
- "Baggage" (Everybody Loves Raymond)
- "Baggage" (The Handmaid's Tale)
- "Baggage" (House)
- "Baggage" (Law & Order: Criminal Intent)

== Other uses ==
- Baggage (album), a 2000 album by Sirsy
- "Baggage", a song by Gryffin from Gravity
- Baggage (radio show), a BBC Radio 4 situation comedy
- Emotional baggage, a colloquialism referring to unresolved psychological issues
- Baggage (film), a Canadian documentary film
- Gantumoote, an Indian Kannada language coming of age drama film
