= Coming Into Frame =

2013 studio album by Sirsy

Studio album by Sirsy
- Released: March 5, 2013
- Recorded: Albany, NY
- Genre: Pop, rock
- Length: 34:46
- Label: Funzalo Records
- Producer: Paul Q. Kolderie and Sean Slade

Sirsy chronology
Revolution (2007)	Coming Into Frame (2013)

Coming Into Frame is the fifth studio album by the Albany-based pop rock band Sirsy, released on March 5, 2013. It is their first album with Funzalo Records. The album was produced by Paul Kolderie and Sean Slade.

== Track listing ==
1. Cannonball - 3:15
2. Lionheart - 2:58
3. Picture - 3:44
4. Brave and Kind - 4:07
5. Killer - 3:23
6. Red Letter Days - 3:01
7. Gold - 3:47
8. Lot of Love - 3:17
9. She's Coming Apart - 2:55
10. The Cost of You - 4:19

== Release history ==
The first track "Cannonball" was released on February 12, 2013, through iTunes, Spotify and other digital distribution methods. The album was released on March 5, 2013. An album release concert is scheduled for April 6, 2013, at Putnam Den in Saratoga Springs, New York.

Region	Date	Label	Format
United States	March 5, 2013	Funzalo Records	CD
