= St. Andrews University (North Carolina) =

Presbyterian university in Laurinburg, North Carolina, US

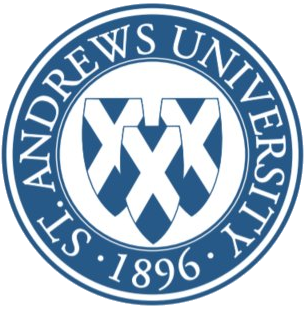
- Former name: St. Andrews Presbyterian College (1960–2011)
- Type: Private university
- Active: 1896–May 2025; 1 year ago
- Parent institution: Webber International University
- Religious affiliation: Presbyterian Church (U.S.A.)
- Endowment: $12.8 million
- President: Tarun Malik
- Faculty: 131
- Students: 809
- Undergraduates: 736
- Location: Laurinburg, North Carolina, U.S. 34.7454°N 79.4786°W
- Campus: Suburban, 940 acres (380.4 ha)
- Colors: Royal blue & white
- Nickname: Knights
- Sporting affiliations: NAIA – Appalachian
- Mascot: Knights
- Website: sa.edu
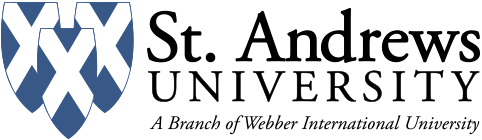
- St. Andrews University
- U.S. National Register of Historic Places
- Built: 1959
- Architectural style: Mid-century modern
- NRHP reference No.: 16000562
- Added to NRHP: August 22, 2016

St. Andrews University was a private Presbyterian university in Laurinburg, North Carolina. It was established in 1958 as a result of a merger of Flora MacDonald College in Red Springs and "Presbyterian Junior College"; it was named St. Andrews Presbyterian College from 1960 until 2011 when the college changed its name to St. Andrews University. That same year, it merged with Webber International University of Babson Park, Florida. It is also home to the St. Andrews Press. In 2013, St. Andrews added its first graduate program, an MBA in business administration.

The institution closed on May 5, 2025, due to financial issues.

== History ==
=== Charter (1958) and open date (1961) ===
The institution was founded in 1958, established as a result of the merger of Flora MacDonald College in Red Springs (est. 1896) and Presbyterian Junior College in Maxton (est. 1928). The new college was named St. Andrews Presbyterian College on September 23, 1960. The name reflected its Scottish Presbyterian heritage and identified it with the University of St Andrews in Scotland. A groundbreaking ceremony was held on April 15, 1959, followed shortly by the construction of a campus on an 800-acre location on the south side of Laurinburg. St. Andrews held an opening convocation and classes began on September 22, 1961, with 750 students. Unusual for its time, the campus was designed to be accessible and barrier-free to students with physical disabilities. Ten buildings had been completed by the opening of the college in 1961, including the Academic Building and the Vardell Building, the Student Center, a maintenance building, and six residence halls named for presbyteries in the Synod of North Carolina.

=== 1970s ===
Enrollment grew to over 900 by 1970, and the college saw expansion of facilities and curriculum in its first ten years. Two additional men's dorms, the DeTamble Library, and the Physical Education Center were completed in the late 1960s, and the Morgan-Jones Science Center and Avinger Auditorium were completed in 1970.

In its early years, the college developed the Christianity and Culture Program, or "C&C" for short. The program focused on an interdisciplinary curriculum that provided freshman and sophomore-level courses in ancient and modern civilization, junior-level courses in non-Western cultures, and senior-level courses in American studies. The program also included study abroad options in Israel, Greece, and Rome. St. Andrews introduced Selected Topics in Modern Science, known as STMS, in 1969. First offered as a required freshman-level two-term course in natural sciences, the STMS developed into a broad interdisciplinary program that connected various scientific disciplines. The college began the St. Andrews Press in 1972.

The college experienced several changes during the early 1970s. St. Andrews, along with many other colleges across the United States, experienced political and social unrest on campus stemming from the unpopular Vietnam War coupled with the rising cost of education, the economic recession, and the 1973 oil crisis. To combat financial struggles and decreased enrollment, St. Andrews replaced the Christianity and Culture Program with a new program known as the St. Andrews Studies Program (SAS).

In the late 1970s, the Student Center was renovated and named the William Henry Belk College Center. The Katherine McKay Belk Tower was built on Chapel Island at the center of campus. St. Andrews renovated the Kings Mountain dormitory in 1978, renamed it Pate Hall and made it into a continuing education center to accommodate an expanding adult education program.

=== 1980s–1990s - expansion of teaching sites and academic offerings ===
In the early 1980s, St. Andrews redesigned its core programs, incorporating curriculum elements of the former C&C, SAS, and STMS programs. The new St. Andrews General Education Program, called SAGE, focused on a general education curriculum with interdisciplinary courses in humanities, social sciences, and natural sciences. St. Andrews also expanded academic majors in the areas of mathematics, computer science, psychology, the natural sciences, and business administration. IN 1989, the college launched the Scottish Heritage Center, dedicated to the preservation of Scottish culture and honoring people who preserve Scottish culture.

In 1990, St. Andrews added a satellite program at Sandhills Community College in Pinehurst to meet additional demand for the college's adult education program. St. Andrews-at-Sandhills began offering junior and senior level courses in the evenings and on weekends. In 1996, St. Andrews launched a degree in Therapeutic Horsemanship, one of the first in the county.

From 1978 until 1999, St. Andrews was the site of the Governor's School of North Carolina's East campus.

=== 2000s – Merger with Webber, name change, and new campuses ===
In 2007, St. Andrews added online programs designed to provide degree and certificate options. The college also consolidated the adult program, online program, and satellite program into the Center for Adult and Professional Studies (CAPS). Two years later, the university became a member of the Servicemembers Opportunity Colleges Consortium (SOC) and received national recognition as a military-friendly institution.

In July 2011, following accreditation issues, St. Andrews and Webber International University announced a merger of the two institutions. With the merger, St. Andrews became an additional instructional location of, and a branch of, Webber International. Webber is accredited by the Southern Association of Colleges and Schools Commission on Colleges (SACSCOC) to award degrees at the associate, bachelor, and master's levels. The merger combined Webber's focus on business programs, four MBA degrees, and extensive online options with St. Andrews' focus on undergraduate liberal arts and science programs.

In September 2011, the college's president, Paul Baldasare Jr., class of 1977, announced the intention to change the name to "St. Andrews University" during the campus' Founders' Day celebration. Baldasare cited increased enrollment goals as well as plans to add graduate programs and expand online programs for adult learners as major reasons for the name change. In 2021, a Master of Arts in Education was added. Tarun Malik was appointed campus president in March 2023.

=== 2025 closure ===
On April 25, 2025, Malik announced that Webber International University's board of trustees has decided to close St. Andrew's University as of May 5, 2025 due to financial issues.

== Campuses ==
St. Andrews University had its original campus in Laurinburg, North Carolina.

=== Laurinburg campus (main campus) ===
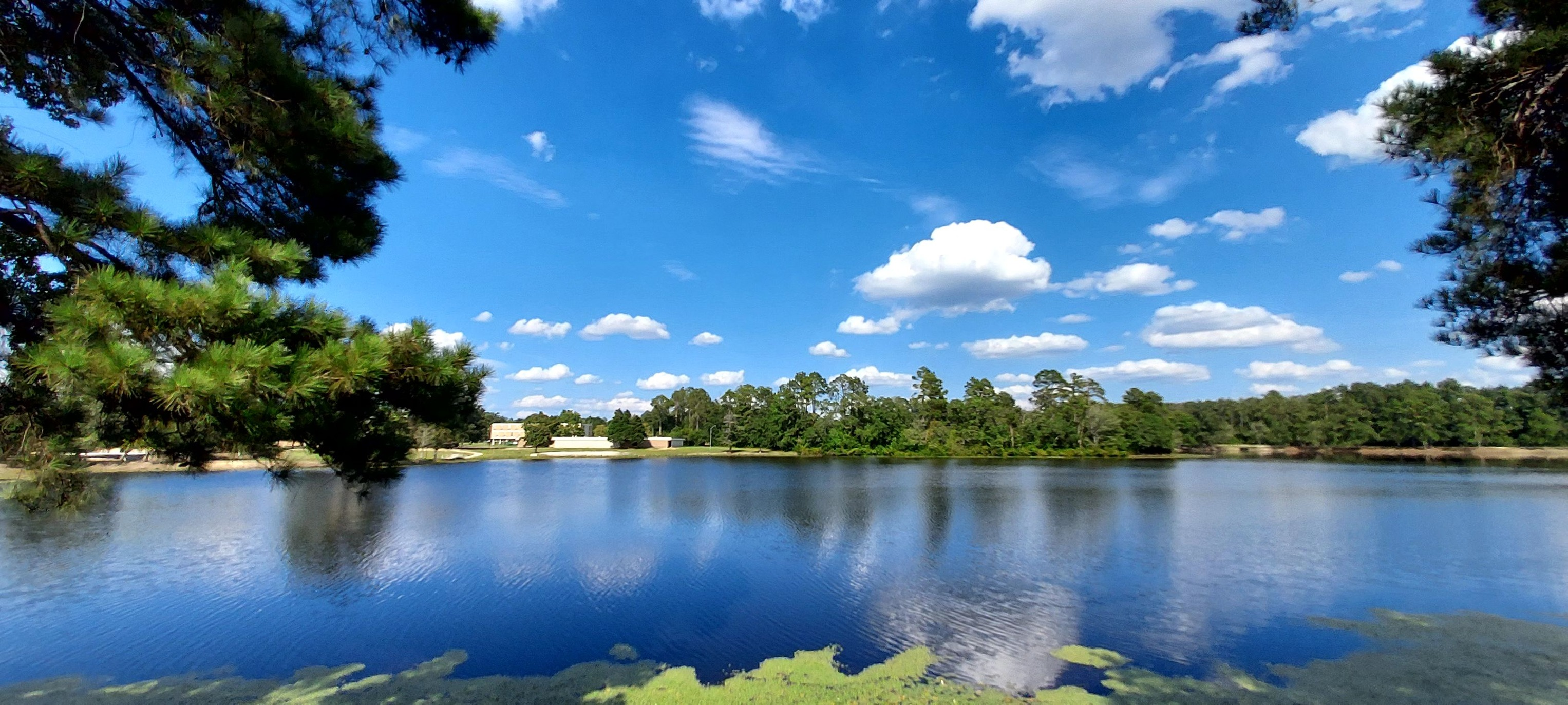
Lake Ansley Moore in the middle of the St. Andrews University campus, Laurinburg, NC

The main campus was located south of downtown Laurinburg, bounded on the west by U.S. Routes 15 and 401. There was a lake in the middle of campus.

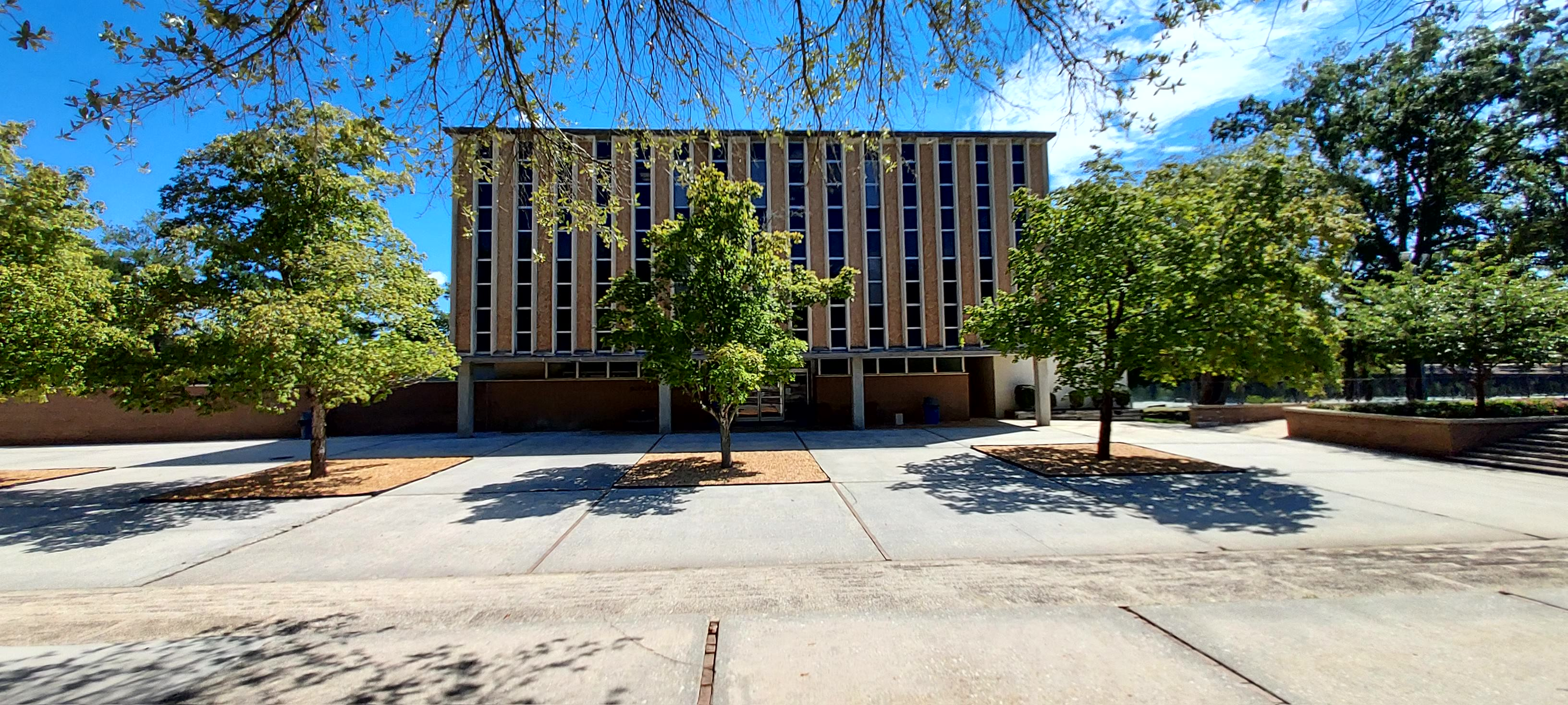
Exterior of DeTamble Library

On the western side of the campus is the Morgan-Jones Science Building, Avinger Auditorium, the Morgan Liberal Arts Building, the DeTamble Library, and the Vardell Building. There is a bridge from one side of the lake to an island to the other side of the lake. On the eastern side of the campus is the Willam Henry Belk student center, where the Crossroads Cafeteria, student store, student mailboxes, and Office of Student Affairs are located. On the south side of this end of campus are four dorms, Concord, Granville, Wilmington, and Albemarle. On the north side are four more dorms, Winston-Salem, Pate, Mecklenburg, and Orange. Pate houses the Student Health & Wellness Center. Across from the Belk Center is the P.E. Building. On the far north end of campus, there are the athletic fields. The Equestrian Center is located off campus, approximately 2 miles south.

The campus was listed on the National Register of Historic Places in 2016.

=== Extension campus ===
In 1990, St. Andrews launched its first satellite campus in Pinehurst at Sandhills Community College for adult learners.

== Academics ==
St. Andrews offers undergraduate programs in the liberal arts and two graduate programs, an MBA, and MA in education. Since 1969, the institution has a press, having published over 200 volumes of poetry, prose, and non-fiction, over 80 are still being printed.

The student-faculty ratio is low, 12:1, resulting in small classes and a personalized education.

St. Andrews offers non-traditional students the opportunity to pursue degrees in Business Administration, Equine Business Management, Elementary Education, Liberal Studies, and courses leading to teacher certification, in an online, traditional classroom, or blended format. In the fall of 2008, the college organized its degree offerings at Sandhills Community College (St. Andrews @ Sandhills), its online program, and its other opportunities for non-traditional learners, under the umbrella of the St. Andrews Center for Adult and Professional Studies.

St. Andrews has charters with the following honor societies: Alpha Chi, Beta Beta Beta, Omicron Delta Epsilon, Pi Gamma Mu, Psi Chi, Sigma Tau Delta, Sigma Beta Delta, and the St. Andrews Honor Society. St. Andrews also offers an honors program, which selects incoming freshmen based on their high school GPA, SAT/ACT scores, and an interview with the director of the program.

== Accreditation ==
In 1961, St. Andrews Presbyterian College was first accredited by the Commission on Colleges of the Southern Association of Colleges and Schools Commission on Colleges (SACSCOC). In June 2007, SACSCOC voted to remove the college's accreditation "for failure to meet accreditation standards dealing with financial resources, stability, and control." St. Andrews appealed the decision, but the commission's College Delegate Assembly upheld the decision to terminate accreditation. The college responded by filing a lawsuit against the association, but the judge granted the motion for summary judgment filed by the Southern Association of Colleges and Schools. The judge directed that judgment be entered in favor of the association, and dismissed the lawsuit filed by St. Andrews.

In April 2011, Webber International University filed a substantive change form to add St. Andrews Presbyterian College as an additional instructional location, providing a merger for the two institutions. Following the filing, the accreditation of St. Andrews was extended through July 31, 2011, to allow for SACSCOC to render a decision on the application during the annual meeting. During the June 2011 SACSCOC meeting, the association approved the plan by Webber International University to add St. Andrews as an additional instructional location. This merger of Webber International University and St. Andrews resolved the accreditation concern with SACSCOC.

The college is a member of North Carolina Independent Colleges and Universities, the Association of Presbyterian Colleges, and the Council of Independent Colleges.

== Athletics ==
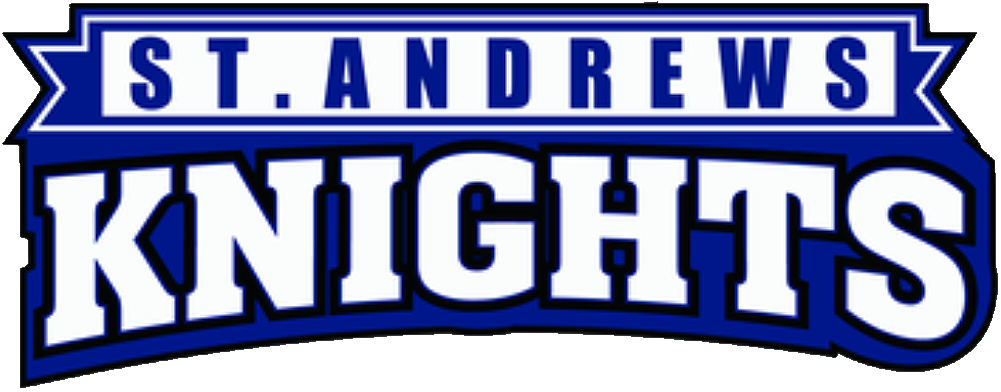
St. Andrews athletics wordmark

The St. Andrews athletic teams were called the Knights. The institution was a member of the National Association of Intercollegiate Athletics (NAIA), primarily competing in the Appalachian Athletic Conference (AAC) from the 2012–13 academic year to its closure at the end of the 2024–25 academic year; while its swimming and wrestling teams competed in the Mid-South Conference (MSC).

Prior returning to the NAIA, The Knights formerly competed in the Conference Carolinas (CC) of the NCAA Division II ranks of the National Collegiate Athletic Association (NCAA) from 1988–89 to 2011–12. It transitioned to the NAIA after 23 years in NCAA Division II, at the end of the 2011–12 academic year.

St. Andrews competed in 20 intercollegiate varsity sports: men's sports included baseball, basketball, football, golf, lacrosse, soccer, swimming, volleyball, and wrestling; while women's sports included basketball, beach volleyball, lacrosse, soccer, softball, swimming, volleyball, and wrestling; and co-ed sports include competitive cheer, competitive dance, and Esports. Former sports included men's & women's cross country, women's golf, and men's and women's track and field.

== Notable alumni ==
- Audrey Bolte, beauty pageant titleholder
- Erin Harkes, singer-songwriter
- Nancy A. Henry, American poet
- Seth Jahn, 7-a-side soccer player
- Lydia Lavelle, American academic and politician
- Mark L. Perkins, president of InnerSight
