= David Bourgeois =

American musician

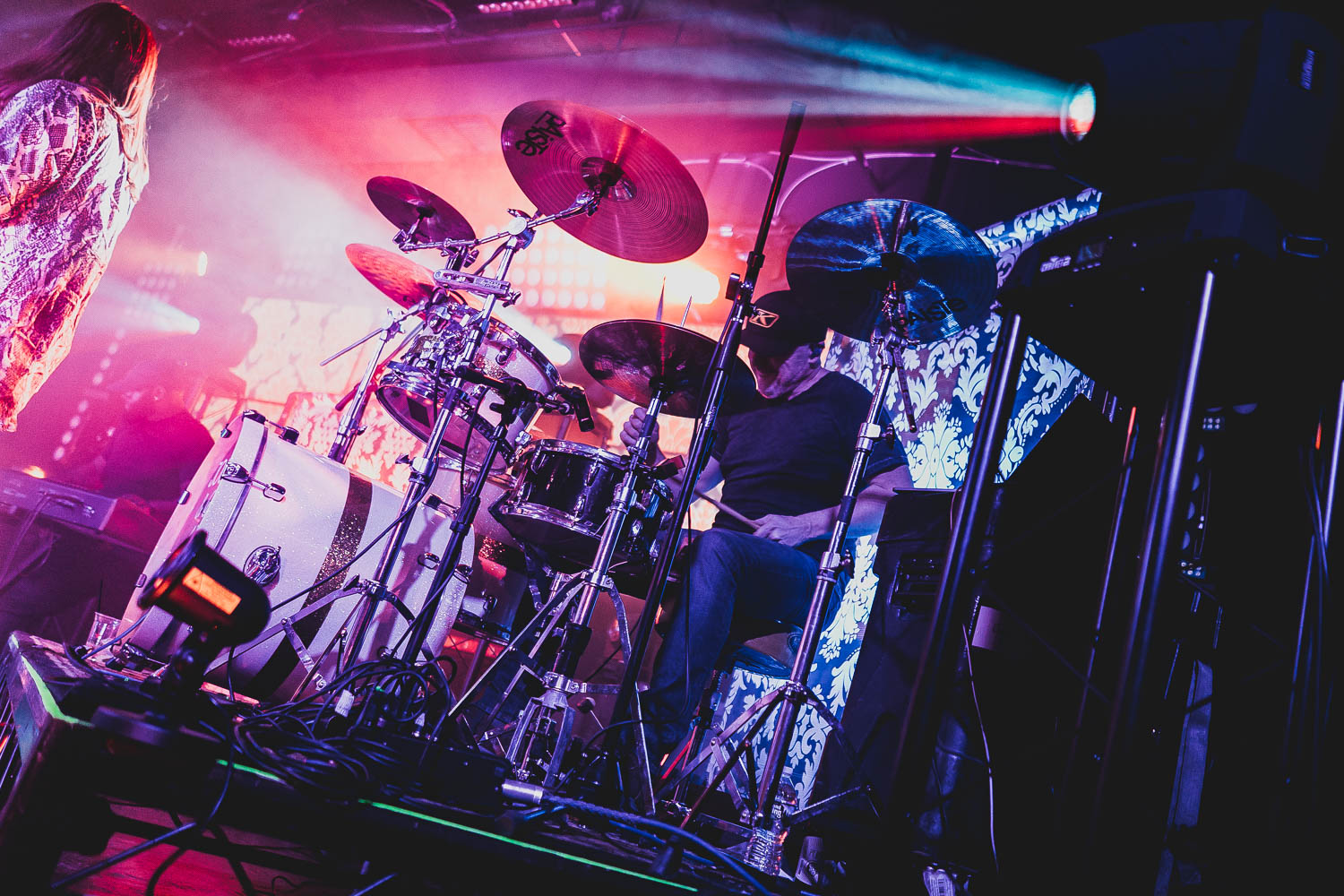
- Born: David Ronald Bourgeois
- Occupations: Drummer; Composer; Producer; sound designer; voice over director; musician
- Years active: 1983-Present
- Title: President and Creative Director, Voice Coaches; Owner, White Lake Music & Post; Owner, producer, and manager, Bridge Road Entertainment

David Bourgeois is a composer, producer, drummer, sound designer, and voice over director from Upstate New York.

== Sound Design and voice over ==
=== Voice Coaches ===
Bourgeois is the Founder and CEO of Voice Coaches, a voice-over and communication training company based in Albany, New York. Company services include voice-over and communication training as well as voice-over recording and production nationwide and abroad.

=== Television ===
Bourgeois and his studios have contributed voice-over production and editing services to multiple television projects, including episodes of HGTV's FreeStyle and TLC's While You Were Out,

Credited role	Show title	Network	Episodes
voice over recording	The Wig People	web-based	Rule #2 (2014); The Secret Code (2014); Todd Is Now Dead (2014); Hoop for Life (2014); Wig Corporate (2014); A Secret Revealed (2014); Matching (2007); Quack Meeting (2014); Abs Like Crabs (2014)
voice over recording	FreeStyle	HGTV	Modern Victorian Living Room (2007); Bachelor Lounge (2007); A Stylish First House (2007); Entertaining Basement (2007); Simplified Family Room (2007); Practical, Yet Sexy Living Room (2007); A Brooklyn Office (2007); A Newlywed Livingroom (2007); Updated, Stylish Den (2007); Romantic Living Room (2007); Stylish Living Room (2007); A Grown-Up Living Room (2007)
voice over recording	Bride vs. Bride	WE tv	Season 1: Steve and Rebekah vs Max and Sabrina (2006)
voice over recording	While You Were Out	TLC	Miami: The 4 T's Kitchen (2006); Fort Lauderdale: The Fast and the Fabulous (2006); Tampa: Bali Magic in the Bedroom (2006); Miami: Swamp Den (2006); Miami: Viva Cuba Libre! (2006); Fort Hood: Because We Care (2006); Austin: Carpe Diem (2006); Phoenix: Phoenix Moms Rock (2005); San Diego: Pacific Rim Fusion (2005); El Cajon: Hacienda Del Sol (2005); San Francisco: Happy Ending Bedroom (2005); San Francisco: Red Is for Romance (2005)

=== Film ===
From 1992 to present, Bourgeois has also contributed music composition, sound editing, and voice-over production to a variety of short and feature-length film projects.

Release date	Title	Genre	Credited role
2016	This is Andromeda	short film	supervising sound editor; music composition
2015	The 46ers	documentary	supervising sound editor
2014	Ballin' at the Graveyard	documentary	supervising sound editor; music composition
2014	All for the Birds	short	music composition
2013	Stepping Toward the Lion: Finding My Story	documentary short	supervising sound editor; music composition
2013	Fighting for Freedom	drama	ADR recordist
2012	Her Telling Heart	short film	sound designer; supervising sound editor
2012	Infatuation	short film	supervising sound editor
2012	You Have One Message	short film	supervising sound editor; music composition
2012	DxONE	short film	voice over supervisor
2012	Save the Date	short film	sound editor
2011	The Summer Monster	short film	supervising sound editor; music composition
2011	Whisper Me a Lullaby	drama	supervising sound editor; music composition
2010	Beneath the Same Sky	short film	voice-over recordist
2010	Ethnic Breath Mints	short film	music composition
2010	Greatest Man Alive	short film	sound editor
2010	The Trampoline	short film	music composition
2008	Distractions	short film	supervising sound editor
2008	Against the Wind	short film	voice-over recordist
2007	Letting Go	short film	music composition
2005	The Last Round	drama	supervising sound editor; music composition
1999	Shadow Tracker: Vampire Hunter	horror	supervising sound editor; music composition
1997	Advising Michael	drama	music composition

== Music production ==
=== Bridge Road Entertainment ===
Bourgeois, along with his wife Anna, is the co-owner of White Lake Studios and Bridge Road Entertainment, a record label and artist management and development company based in Albany, New York. Bridge Road Entertainment's current artist roster includes sibling blues-rock musicians Jocelyn and Chris Arndt, and Margo Macero. Bourgeois acts as manager and producer.

==== Jocelyn and Chris ====
Since he began working with Jocelyn and Chris in 2013, they have recorded and produced a studio EP (Strangers in Fairyland), two full-length albums (Edges and Go), and a live LP (30,000 Miles). A musician himself, Bourgeois also contributed drumming, percussion, and synthesizer programming to these releases.

In May 2017, Jocelyn and Chris Arndt released Go, a full-length record produced and recorded by Bourgeois at White Lake Music & Post in Albany, New York.

The album includes single "Footprints on the Moon," which was Billboard's 5th most added Adult Album Alternative track in the nation the week of its release to radio, and "Red Stops Traffic," which debuted on the Billboard AAA Top 40 Indicator Chart at No. 37 in December 2017. "Red Stops Traffic" remained in the Top 40 for six weeks total, peaking at No. 35.

The first month of its release, Go appeared at No. 2 on the Relix National Jamband Top 30 Chart. It remained in the No. 2 position through July, dropping to No. 9 in August and No. 10 in September. The album fell off the chart in October 2017, reappearing at No. 17 in November.

On February 22, 2019, Jocelyn and Chris released a new full-length album produced by Bourgeois. Titled The Fun in the Fight, it features eleven original tracks and guest players including Danny Louis of Gov't Mule, Cory Wong of Vulfpeck, and Beau Sasser of Kung Fu. The first week of its release, it reached #1 on the Relix Jambands Top 30 Album Chart. It also debuted at #50 on the AMA Albums Chart. In subsequent weeks, "Outta My Head" broke into the Billboard Triple A Indicator Top 40, peaking at #33. On June 10, the second single from The Fun in the Fight, "Kill in the Cure," impacted radio, where it was the #1 Most Added Single to Triple A radio in its first week. Following this debut, it entered the Triple A Indicator Top 40, peaking at #29.

On March 7, 2019, Bourgeois appeared with Jocelyn & Chris and their band to perform their song "Outta My Head" live on NBC's Today Show.

On February 14, 2020, Jocelyn and Chris released One Night in November, a collection of acoustic re-imaginings of several previously released tracks in addition to one new original song. The entire album was produced by Bourgeois and recorded in front of an intimate audience at White Lake Studios in Upstate New York. The new original track, titled "Mercy Me," was premiered by American Songwriter, who praised the entire LP's "raw, impressive intimacy" and noted that the acoustic format of the record "allows the band to lean into and further explore each song's unshakable roots." Following its release, One Night in November debuted on the Relix Jambands Top 30 Album Chart at #27 in February, reaching #1 in March and then moving back to #22 in April.

On June 17, 2021, Jocelyn and Chris's new single "Sugar and Spice" and its accompanying music video premiered with American Songwriter, who called the track "pure American-rock-goodness."

==== Vinny Michaels ====
Country artist Vinny Michaels signed with Bourgeois under Bridge Road Entertainment in 2018. Since then, he has debuted one single titled "Crazy," with plans to release his first full-length album in the spring.

==== Past artists ====
Bridge Road Entertainment previously managed and developed country singer-songwriter Chelsea Cavanaugh, whose debut LP Simply was released in 2013.

=== Production discography ===
Release date	Title	Artist	Credited roles
2021	Sugar and Spice (Single)	Jocelyn and Chris	Producer; Drums; Percussion; Programming
2020	One Night in November (Live Acoustic LP)	Jocelyn and Chris	Producer; Drums; Percussion
2019	The Fun in the Fight (Studio LP)	Jocelyn and Chris	Producer; Drums; Percussion; Synth Programming
2017	Go (Studio LP)	Jocelyn and Chris	Producer; Engineer; Drums; Synth Programming
2017	30,000 Miles (Live LP)	Jocelyn and Chris	Producer; Drums
2016	Edges (Studio LP)	Jocelyn and Chris	Producer; Drums; Percussion
2014	Strangers in Fairyland (Studio EP)	Jocelyn and Chris	Producer; Drums; Percussion; Creative Director; Vocal Producer; Synth Programming
2013	Simply (Studio LP)	Chelsea Cavanaugh	Producer; Arranger; Piano; Hammond B3; Drums; Percussion; Programming
2007	All for a Reason (Studio LP)	Flame	Producer; Engineer; Mixing
2007	Holiday Classics (Studio LP)	Flame	Producer; Engineer

=== White Lake Music and Post ===
In 1996, Bourgeois and his wife Anna opened White Lake Music & Post, a recording and post-production facility located in Schenectady. The facility is named after White Lake in the Adirondack Mountains, where the Bourgeois family has had a camp for three generations.

== Personal life ==
Bourgeois is originally from Boonville, New York. A self-proclaimed "music geek," he played percussion in a variety of groups and ensembles throughout elementary and high school and participated in all-state music ensembles. He credits much of his current success to his parents' support for his early decision to pursue a career in the arts:

My parents always made my sister and I feel that we could accomplish anything as long as we understood the work involved to reach our goals. There's no question that this support has played a big part in my life today.

— Bourgeois, Success Magazine, Ltd.

At age twenty, Bourgeois moved to Albany in pursuit of his musical interests, performing and recording in multiple area bands and studying percussion and electronic music at the University at Albany. He soon began to gain studio experience as well, starting with recording and composition for singer-songwriters and commercial advertising and progressing to projects that included casting and directing voice over recordings which cemented his role as a music composer and producer.
