= Erin Harkes =

American singer-songwriter (born 1977)

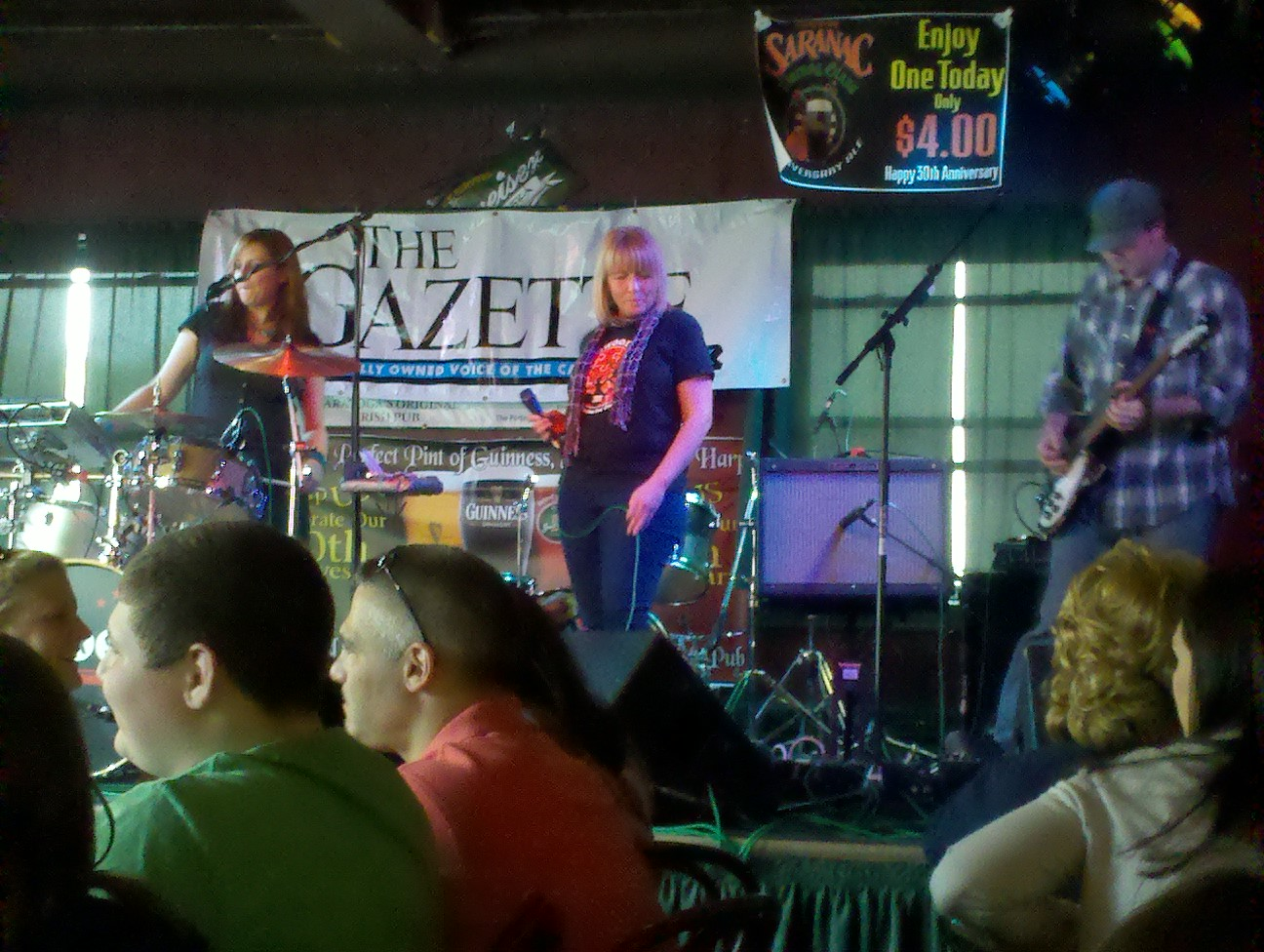
- Erin Harkes singing with Albany-based band Sirsy at The Parting Glass in Schenectady.

Background information
- Born: October 12, 1977 (age 48); Kearny, New Jersey, U.S.
- Origin: New York City, U.S.
- Genres: Blues
- Occupation: Singer-songwriter
- Instruments: Vocals, guitar
- Years active: 2002–present
- Website: www.erinharkes.com

Erin Harkes is an American singer-songwriter and comedian.

== Music career ==
Harkes is known in the Albany area, having been named among the Capital District's best musicians by both the Albany Times-Union and Metroland. She also regularly teams up with the Albany-based band Sirsy.

In 2004, Harkes teamed up with Albany, NY-based band Folding Sky to enter the 2004 Colossal Contender Blues Competition, which they won giving them a shot to compete in Memphis. In addition, she has opened for acts such as the 10,000 Maniacs and Company of Thieves.

On April 7, 2010, Harkes was chosen from the audience to participate in a "Battle of the Instant Bands" on Late Night with Jimmy Fallon. Erin spent twenty minutes with her impromptu band, the "Fallon Angels," and put together a winning song they called "Free Jimmy."

Since 2017 she has also been performing standup comedy.

In 2021, she released he first comedy album Zoloft and Probation.

In March 2023, she recorded her first comedy film special at Albany Funny Bone.

In June 2023, she was to perform and headline comedy series at Universal Preservation Hall in Saratoga Springs, New York.

== Personal life ==
Harkes grew up in Middleburgh, New York. When she was young, her parents formed a pipe band. She started playing the bass drum in it when she was 13, and later she was recruited to play in the pipe band at St. Andrews Presbyterian College in Laurinburg, North Carolina, where she recorded her first CD during her senior year.

Upon graduating in 2000, Harkes moved to Albany. Her first job was driving an ice-cream truck. As of June 2011, in addition to her music career, she maintains a full-time day job as a data entry clerk for Albany County Child Protective Services.

Erin is first cousin to National Soccer Hall of Famer John Harkes.

On June 14, 2008, Harkes' older sister was killed in a wreck caused by a drunk driver. The death of her sister led Harkes to begin drinking heavily. In a 2011 interview, Harkes says, "I was always definitely fond of the drink...[my sister's death] just gave me an excuse." She eventually sought help and stopped drinking in late 2010.

== Discography ==
- Bar Napkins and Magic Markers
- Live at the Elbow Room, NYC (2002)
- Rough (2003) with The Rebound
- Special I Am (2006)
- Overit Sessions - EP (2018)
- Zoloft and Probation (2021)
