= Away from Here =

Away From Here

Studio album by Sirsy
- Released: March 30, 2002
- Recorded: Albany, New York
- Genre: Pop rock
- Length: 42:46
- Label: sirsymusic
- Producer: Richard Libutti, Melanie Krahmer

Sirsy chronology
Baggage (2000)	Away From Here (2002)	At This Time (Live) (2002)

Away From Here is the second studio album from the pop rock band Sirsy, and was released March 30, 2002.

== Track listing ==
1. "She Says" - 3:55
2. "Paper Moon" - 4:56
3. "Uncomfortable" - 3:23
4. "Crybaby" - 3:50
5. "Kiss Me Here" - 3:59
6. "Please Let Me Be" - 3:19
7. "You" - 3:25
8. "Whenever You're Around" - 4:26
9. "Anyway" - 5:08
10. Kiss Me Here (Reprise)" - 2:06
