= At This Time (Live) =

Live album by Sirsy
- Released: October 29, 2002
- Recorded: Saratoga Springs, NY
- Genre: Pop That Rocks
- Length: 54:58

Sirsy chronology
Away From Here (2002)	At This Time (Live) (2002)	Ruby (2004)

At This Time (Live) is the third release and the first live album from the Albany-based pop rock band Sirsy. It was recorded live at E. O'Dwyers in Saratoga Springs, New York and released on October 29, 2002.

== Track listing ==
1. This Time
2. Anyway
3. Paper Moon
4. Dry
5. Whenever You're Around
6. Kiss Me Here
7. IOU
8. Soon
9. Please Let Me Be
10. Wishless
11. She Says
12. At Last (available only on limited first run)
13. Crybaby (acoustic demo version)
