= Ruby (Sirsy album) =

Studio album by Sirsy
- Released: May 18, 2004
- Recorded: Albany, New York
- Genre: Pop rock
- Length: 39:33
- Label: sirsymusic
- Producer: John Delehanty, Richard Libutti, Melanie Krahmer

Sirsy chronology
At This Time (Live) (2004)	Ruby (2004)	Some Kind Of Winter (2004)

Ruby is the third studio album by the Albany-based pop rock band Sirsy. It was released on May 18, 2004.

== Track listing ==
1. "By July" - 3:41
2. "Hostage" - 4:01
3. "Fine" - 4:05
4. "Pet" - 3:59
5. "Lie To Me" - 4:10
6. "Soul Sucker" - 3:43
7. "Spark" - 3:37
8. "Me And My Ego" - 3:16
9. "Again" - 4:52
10. "Blacker Than Blue" - 4:16
