= Revolution (Sirsy album) =

Studio album by Sirsy
- Released: October 20, 2007
- Recorded: Albany, NY
- Genre: Pop, rock
- Length: 41:24
- Label: sirsymusic
- Producer: Rich Libutti and Melanie Krahmer

Sirsy chronology
Covered	Revolution	BYOB: Collection B

Revolution is the fourth self-produced studio album by the Albany-based pop rock band Sirsy, released on October 20, 2007. The album was remixed by Paul Kolderie and rereleased on July 6, 2010 by Funzalo Records.

== Track listing ==
1. Revolution - 3:30
2. Sorry Me - 4:14
3. Leftover Girl - 3:34
4. Crazy - 3:36
5. Waiting for Rain - 6:00
6. Oh! Billy - 3:38
7. Still - 4:24
8. Mary Concetta - 4:09
9. Mercury - 4:27
10. Fireflies - 3:56

== Music videos ==
Sirsy has created music videos for the songs "Revolution" and "Sorry Me," both of which are available from the band's YouTube channel. In the Spring of 2010, Sirsy announced at some of their shows that the video for "Revolution" had received airtime on HBO between feature presentations.

== Release history ==
The original album release concert was held at Revolution Hall in Troy, New York on October 20, 2007, which is the largest show the band has played as the headliner act.

Region	Date	Label	Format
United States	October 20, 2007	Sirsymusic	CD
United States	July 6, 2010	Funzalo	CD
