= Baggage (album) =

Studio album by Sirsy
- Released: September 2000
- Recorded: NY
- Genre: Pop That Rocks
- Length: 41:00
- Label: Independent

Sirsy chronology
Baggage (2000)	Away from Here (2002)

Baggage is the first studio album from the New York band Sirsy, released in September 2000 and re-released in November 2002.

== Track listing ==
1. Delicious - 4:22
2. This Time - 3:53
3. Soon - 4:43
4. Dry - 3:47
5. So Good - 3:44
6. IOU - 4:14
7. Soft Like A Girl - 3:43
8. Let Go - 4:31
9. Hurricane - 3:10
10. Wishless - 5:00
