= The Tins =

American indie rock band

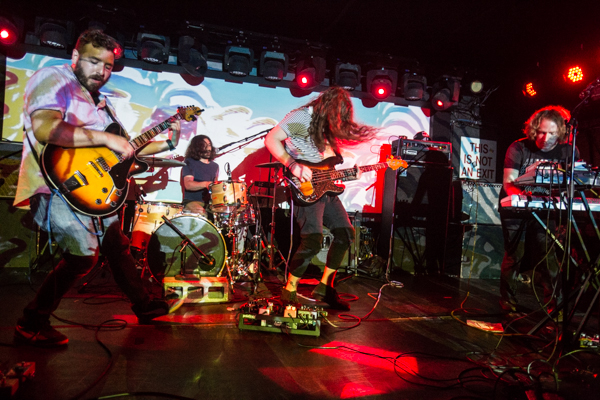
- The Tins performing at Mercury Lounge in July 2018. From Left To Right: Adam Putzer, David Muntner, Justin John Smith, and Michael Santillo

Background information
- Origin: Buffalo, New York, U.S.
- Genres: Indie rock, alternative, pop
- Years active: 2010–present
- Labels: V2 Records; Devise Records; Yellow Year Records
- Members: Michael Santillo; Adam Putzer; David Muntner; Justin John Smith
- Website: thetinsmusic.com

The Tins are an American indie rock band from Buffalo, New York. The band is composed of Michael Santillo (vocals, keyboard), Adam Putzer (guitar, vocals) David Muntner (drums, vocals), and Justin John Smith (bass).

They are best known for their 2010 song, "The Green Room" off their debut, self-titled EP which was released through V2 Records. The band has since released an album, Life's A Gas and three additional EP's ("Young Blame", "Love on Strike", and "City Lies").

Their second full-length album, eponymously titled The Tins, was released on June 1, 2018. This album was followed up by the double A-side singles, "Saksaywaman / Open Minded" and covers, "Not A Second Time / Shelter From The Storm".

A short documentary about the band is slated for release in 2019.

== Discography ==
=== Studio albums ===
- Life's A Gas (2012)
- The Tins (2018)

=== Extended plays ===
- The Tins (2010)
- Young Blame (2014)
- Love On Strike (2015)
- City Lies (2017)

=== Singles ===
- Friday Afternoon (2016)
- Sundried Mind (2018)
- Hear Me Out (2018)
- Saksaywaman / Open Minded (2018)
- Not A Second Time / Shelter From The Storm (2018)
- Boulder Soul (2019)
- City Lies II (2019)
- Sooner Or Later (2019)
