= Wild Adriatic =

American rock band

- Origin: Saratoga Springs, New York
- Genres: Rock and roll, blues rock, soul
- Years active: 2011–present
- Members: Travis Gray; Rich Derbyshire; Mateo Vosganian; Mike Oehmen; Vicky Oehmen; Dustin DeLuke
- Past members: Shane Gilman; Scott Hannay
- Website: www.wildadriatic.band

Wild Adriatic (also known as WA) is an American rock band formed in Saratoga Springs, New York in 2011. They released their self-titled debut EP in 2011, followed closely behind by two more EPs. Their first full-length album, Big Suspicious, was released in January 2014. In May 2015, they released the EP Never Enough, which features a cover of "Ain't No Sunshine" by Bill Withers and their first single "Strange Persuasions".

== History ==
=== Early years (to 2011) ===
The genesis of Wild Adriatic came about in several parts. Initially, singer and guitarist Travis Gray and drummer Mateo Vosganian were both members of a high school age pop-punk group called Horse In A Box. After the band members graduated Queensbury High School in 2004, the members parted ways in 2005 and went on to form other projects. Gray would continue to tour locally with another pop-rock act and Vosganian moved to Los Angeles to continue working with college friends. The two ended up back in the same town of Saratoga Springs, New York, shortly after Gray's band (then called Travis Gray & The Frontiers) decided to shake up their image, change the name, and adopt a more rock & roll sound, eventually becoming the band that would be Wild Adriatic.

At the time that Gray decided to push towards a more rock and roll, band-based format, the band consisted of Gray on lead vocals and guitar, guitarist Shane Gilman, bassist Matthew Dobbs, and drummer Scott Francisco. After a trip to Italy, Gray ended up with his feet in the Adriatic Sea and that stuck with him when he returned to the US, deciding the band would be renamed Wild Adriatic.

The band quickly recorded their debut EP (The Lion, released February 5, 2011), and then drummer Scott Francisco left the group. Vosganian was called in and after one rehearsal the band moved forward, playing numerous shows throughout the Albany, Saratoga, and Glens Falls regions. As writing sessions began to ramp up for what would be the band's second EP, bassist Dobbs ended up leaving the group in July 2011. After auditioning various different area bassists, Vosganian found himself on a long drive with current bassist Rich Derbyshire lamenting the difficulties the band was having finding a bass player. Looking for a more serious band to work with, Derbyshire offered to learn the songs on bass and come audition the following week having never played the instrument before.

=== Lock & Key and Big Suspicious (2012–2014) ===
With Derbyshire on bass and a solid touring line-up, Wild Adriatic self released the Lock & Key EP on April 27, 2012. A busy 2012 and 2013 of touring throughout the Northeastern United States earned the band accolades from Relix Magazine and they were voted "Best Rock Band" by the Capital Region weekly newspaper Metroland.

During early writing sessions for the band's debut album Big Suspicious, consistent writing conflicts between Gilman and the rest of the group eventually ushered in a split in June 2013. Initially, the three remaining members Gray, Vosganian, and Derbyshire looked for a replacement but ended up deciding to continue forth as a power trio, with Gray picking up all of the guitar duties. After relieving Gilman of his duties, the band was left with just four days of rehearsal before their first tour as a trio.

After expanding their touring reach to the Eastern half of the United States, supporting bands like Wishbone Ash, Black Taxi, Blues Traveler, and Deer Tick, the band was invited to open the main stage at 2013's Gathering of the Vibes festival. In September 2013, the band entered Edie Road Studios in Argyle, New York, to record their debut album.

A self-produced effort helmed by vocalist/guitarist Travis Gray, Big Suspicious was recorded and mixed in three weeks, assisted by longtime high school friend Jacob Lavin. This album saw a more focused publicity push, landing premieres with Rolling Stone, USA Today, Huffington Post, and beyond. The album officially saw its release on January 21, 2014 and debuted at No. 66 on the CMJ Top 200 radio chart, the highest charting self-released album on the charts at that time.

Touring in support of the album, the band played 176 shows in 2014, including slots at moe.down 2014 and six unofficial shows at SXSW. The group's first European tour took place over five weeks in November and December 2014, landing the band rave reviews all over Spain, Germany, Belgium, and beyond.

=== Never Enough (2015) ===
Early 2015 saw the band consistently on the road across the US, ending their winter with a six-week residency in Austin, Texas, leading up to SXSW, in addition to being featured in a theatrical commercial for Dolby Laboratories. All ramping up to the release of Never Enough, Wild Adriatic's third EP/CD release, on March 17, 2015. The five song disc features the new single "Strange Persuasions" and saw its release on March 17, 2015, at the SXSW Festival. From there the band picked back up on with their hard-touring schedule, making stops at Bonnaroo, Summer Camp, and beyond. The band returned to writing sessions in late 2015, renting houses and studio space in Wilmington, Vermont, and Argyle, New York, with focus on releasing a sophomore album in mid-2016.

=== 2016 and beyond ===
January 2016 saw the release of the band's first live album, recorded over a two night stand in Albany, New York, on October 30 & 31, 2015, as well as the band's first voyage on The Rock Boat, a yearly rock and roll cruise sailing out of Miami. The group also announced their return to Europe for a four-week headlining tour in April and May 2016. The band returned to The Rock Boat (XVII) leaving from Tampa, Florida, in February, 2017.

In April 2019, the band won Rock/Pop Artist of the Year and Album of the Year at the inaugural Eddies Awards in New York. They went on to play three shows with Lynyrd Skynyrd in 2019, in May at Mohegan Sun in Uncasville, Connecticut, and in August at BB&T Pavilion in Camden, New Jersey, and the Saratoga Performing Arts Center in Saratoga Springs, New York.

The band toured with Andy Frasco and the UN, as well as Turkuaz, in 2019 before releasing a studio EP Our Time.

Their third annual festival 'The Summit' was scheduled for November 2019 at the Queensbury Hotel in upstate New York.

== Musical influences ==
The band often references such as Led Zeppelin, Queen, Bill Withers, Mountain, Foreigner, early Rush, Free, and the Beatles as influences. More contemporary influences including Black Keys, Mutemath, My Morning Jacket, Keane, Wolfmother, and Alabama Shakes have also been referenced. In recent years, the band has made a noted push towards developing the soul elements of their sound, citing artists such as Otis Redding, Bill Withers, and Marvin Gaye as large influences.

== Discography ==
=== Studio albums ===
- Big Suspicious (2014)
- Feel (2017)
- Wild Adriatic (Self-Titled) (2025)

=== EPs ===
- The Lion (2011)
- Lock & Key (2012)
- Never Enough (2015)
- Adriatic/Rodriguez ft. Dan Rodriguez (February, 2019)

=== Live albums ===
- No Way, Let's Do It! (2016)
