= Big Suspicious =

Studio album by Wild Adriatic
- Released: January 21, 2014
- Recorded: September 2013
- Genre: Rock, blues rock
- Length: 42:50

Wild Adriatic chronology
| Lock & Key EP (2012) | Big Suspicious (2014) | Never Enough EP (2015) |

Big Suspicious is the first full-length studio album from American rock trio band Wild Adriatic released in 2014. It was funded through fan support through PledgeMusic, reaching its goal of $11,000 on December 3, 2013. It has generated two official music videos for Lonely and Mess Around.

== History ==
The band recorded the album while living together for several weeks in a studio in Argyle, New York. The band chose to self-record the album, with Gray engineering and mixing the songs. The official CD release party took place January 18 in Albany, NY. The performance was filmed for an as of yet unreleased live DVD.

== Critical reception ==
Big Suspicious has been called 'vintage' rock with its "meaty guitar riffs, organ, tambourine and cowbell. Soaring vocals, infectious hooks. This is the stuff that was designed to move a party and still does."

== Track listing ==
All songs written, performed, and produced by Wild Adriatic.

| No. | Title | Length |
|---|---|---|
| 1. | "Can't Be Your Man" | 3:23 |
| 2. | "Mess Around" | 3:25 |
| 3. | "The Fool" | 3:46 |
| 4. | "40 Days 40 Nights (Hard Times)" | 3:08 |
| 5. | "Tight Grip" | 2:58 |
| 6. | "Holding You" | 3:25 |
| 7. | "Cooperstown" | 4:33 |
| 8. | "Lose My Mind" | 3:34 |
| 9. | "Walk For Miles" | 3:26 |
| 10. | "Lonely" | 3:07 |
| 11. | "Heavy Soul" | 3:39 |
| 12. | "Woe" | 4:21 |
| Total length: | | 42:50 |

== Credits ==
Wild Adriatic

- Travis Gray – vocals, lead guitar
- Rich Derbyshire – bass
- Mateo Vosganian – drums

Additional Musicians

- Scott Hannay – Keyboard – Tracks 1 through 10
- Dan Maddalone – Trombone – Tracks 2, 3 & 11
- Chris Weatherly – Trumpet – Tracks 2, 3 & 11
- Dylan Sorensen – Saxophone – Tracks 2, 3, & 11
- Meghan Gray – Backup Vocals – Track 2
- Maggie Goble – Backup Vocals – Track 11
- Pat Daley, Rich Derbyshire, Maggie Goble, Rebecca Grat, Mike Ingignoli, Jacob Lavine, Shima Miabadi, Jeff Morad, Kim Neaton, Adam Patten, Jacob Schmiel, Mateo Vosganian, Chuck Vosganian, and Mallory Wright/Morad – Group Vocals – Track 12

Other Credits

- Assistant Engineer – Jacon Lavin
- Recorded and Mixed – Travis Gray
- Mastered by Alan Douches at West West Side
- Drum Tech – Thomas Alberto Elefante
