= Mirk =

US musical group

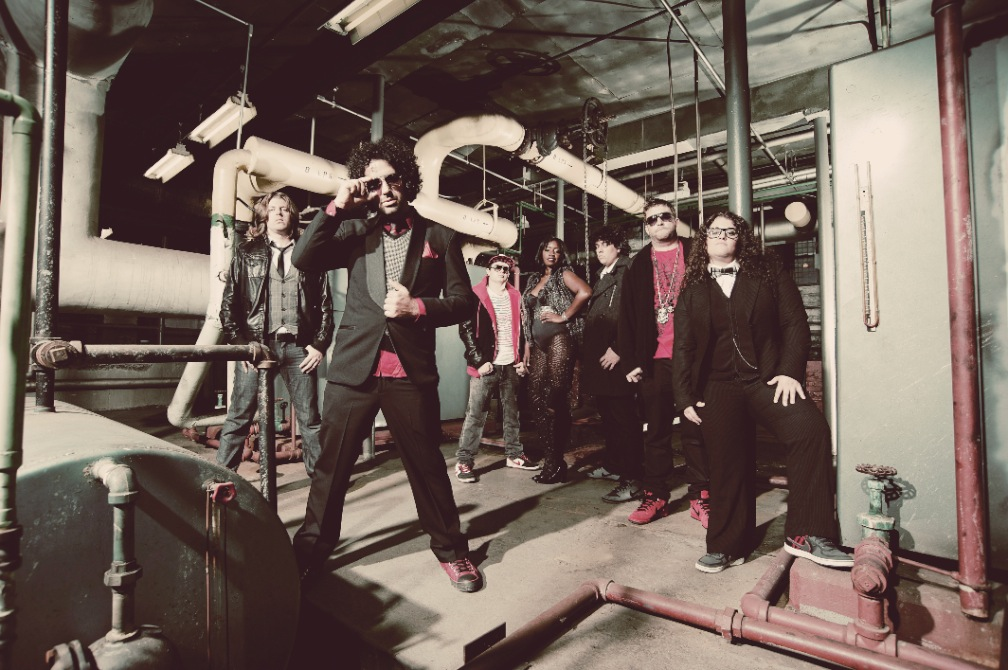
- Mirk

Background information
- Origin: Albany, New York, United States
- Genres: Pop, soul, R&B, hip-hop
- Years active: 2009–present
- Label: Foster House Records
- Members: Joshua Mirsky, Vocals; Mike Thornton, Guitar/Vocals; James Rock, Keys/Vocals; Chris Russell, Saxophone; Kate Sgroi, Bass/Vocals; Stephen Struss, Drums
- Past members: Andy O'Brien, keys Carl Blackwood, Drums; Dan Root, Drums; Mike Finch, Trumpet; Tara Merritt, Vocals; Dan Gerken, bass
- Website: Official website Facebook; Myspace

Mirk is an American musical group from Albany, New York, founded in 2009. Their music has been characterized as a cross between the genres of pop, soul, rock, R&B, and hip-hop.

Besides writing and performing their own music, Mirk has also been credited with producing music for Jay-Z, Petey Pablo, Eamon, Ciara, Young Jeezy, and Rob Cas among others; including a "Gold" certification by the RIAA.

As of Spring 2012, only months after releasing their second album, Grind, the band has returned to the studio to continue writing new music. They also continue their heavy live-performance schedule, playing between 50-75+ shows a year across the United States.

== History ==
=== Formation and "Love" album (2009-2010) ===
Mirk's (formerly Mirk and the New Familiars, the group shortened their name to Mirk in October 2010) debut album, "Love", was all written, recorded, mixed and originally performed by lead vocalist and producer, Joshua Mirsky. After several solo performances, he assembled a live band along with Mike Thornton and Andy O'Brien to recreate the album's unique sound. The album's single, "Forbidden" received high praise from critics and was well received by fans. A subsequent music video was filmed later that year in New York City which features a cameo by Grammy award-winning R&B singer Maxwell.

After a sold out full-band debut show on February 13, 2009, a follow-up EP titled "Broke" was released a few months later.

Mirk gained national attention in 2009 after numerous press outlets reported on their collaboration with Jay-Z and Regina Spektor. Mirk has been credited with producing and arranging the song "Crispy Benjamins", acquired by Jay-Z and Roc Nation in September 2009.

=== Line-up changes and "Love/Live" album (2010-2011) ===
In late 2009, bassist Dan Gerken and drummer Carl Blackwood left to pursue other musical options. Kate Sgroi was playing trumpet in the group at the time, but with the departure of Gerken, she took over on bass. Then adding Dan Root on drums and Mike Finch on trumpet to replace Sgroi, the band moved back into the studio.

Due to the rising success of the group and the popularity of the new live-band versions of "Love", Mirk went into the studio in early 2010 and re-recorded the album live with the full band and "live" versions of the songs. The album was called "Love/Live; A 2pt Trilogy" and was a free download on the band's website.

Just after the recording sessions of ''Love/Live", Dan Root announced he would be leaving the band. Replaced with current member, Stephen Struss, the band finished "Love/Live" and released it for free. Throughout 2010, the group continued writing new material, and focused on playing around the northeast to continue to build their fan base. In the fall of 2010, Mike Finch (trumpet) left the group to also explore other avenues. No replacement was made for Finch, but late 2010 the band announced on their website that new vocalist Tara Merritt would be joining the group.

=== "Grind" album and future (2011-Present) ===
After two years of playing shows across the northeast in support of "Love", the band made it back into the studio in early 2011 to begin work on their second album. Having been writing new material since the release of "Love", the writing process was quick. After months of recording and production, the band began slipping new songs into live shows to hint at the new album.

On September 28th, 2011 the band posted a teaser image on their website that officially announced their second album titled "Grind" would be pre-released on December 2nd, 2011 to select fans. At the "fan-exclusive" album release show, the first 500 fans were given a free copy of the new album months before its official release.

"Grind" was officially released to the public in the Spring of 2012 on iTunes and on //bandcamp, where fans can name their own price. "Grind" was the band's first studio album which featured songs performed and written by all members of the band and, like "Love", was self-produced and recorded in the band's private studio. "Away", the album's first single, was the band's second music video thanks to a successfully backed Kickstarter campaign. Only weeks later, the band announced the follow-up single, "Beautiful Music", which too received a music video and features Grammy Award winning, platinum rapper Mr. Cheeks of the hip-hop supergroup Lost Boyz. Mr. Cheeks frequently performs with the band during live shows, in which they also perform several Lost Boyz hits like "Renee"

Run is set to be released in the early Spring of 2015. The first singles off MIRK's new album are Let It Go, Rocketship and Old School.

== Present ==
In March 2012, Mirk went on their first national tour in support of "Grind". The tour started in their hometown of Albany, NY and went through New York City, Atlanta, New Orleans (among other major cities), ultimately leading up to their stop at the 2012 SXSW festival in Austin, TX.

MIRK has completed their third full-length studio album RUN, which was released in the Spring of 2015. Along with the release of their new album, MIRK shot 5 new music videos to go along with RUN. These videos were released alongside the singles when RUN came out.

== Discography ==
- 2015 - Run
- 2012 - Grind
- 2010 - Live at the Linda
- 2010 - Love/Live A 2 Part Trilogy
- 2009 - Broke EP
- 2009 - Love
