= The Show (band) =

American musical group

- Origin: Pittsburgh, Pennsylvania, U.S.
- Genres: Indie pop, Britpop, post-punk, electronic music
- Years active: 2005–2016
- Label: Activate Records
- Members: Johnny Saint-Lethal; Brandon Mitchell
- Past members: Michael Ward; Matthew Vaughan; Jake Stretch; Jacob Reiger

The Show is a band from Pittsburgh, Pennsylvania. The band is best known for the singles "I Don't Mind" and "To Save My Soul" from their 2009 debut LP Here's to Your Jigsaw, and also for their single "Don't Ask Don't Tell" (2013).

== History ==
Musician Johnny Saint-Lethal, who formed the Britpop-style band The Show." 'was driving eastbound through New Mexico in 2005 when he picked up Brandon Mitchell, who was hitchhiking to New York. Mitchell, who wrote poems, became an instant friend to Saint-Lethal, who taught him to play the guitar. The two later formed The Show in Pittsburgh after initially limiting their collaboration to only helping each other's solo performances. In 2009, they released their album Here's to Your Jigsaw. After the album received some airplay in Europe, the band went on tour in the United Kingdom in 2010 through the help of Chris Potter and Richard Ashcroft of The Verve. The band followed up with a US tour the next year. The Show was selected as a Musician's Atlas Spotlight Artist. In 2012, The Show's activity was put on hold after Saint-Lethal—the band's lead vocalist—was diagnosed with leukoplakia. He regained the use of his vocal cords the following year through the use of homeopathic remedies, and the band was reconstituted. In 2014, The Show performed at Max Yasgur's farm for the 45th anniversary concert commemorating Woodstock.

The band's sound consists of what has been described as indie pop, Britpop, post-punk, and electronic music.

Johnny Saint-Lethal is the subject of Sun Kil Moon/ Jesu song "Twenty Something", which Mark Kozelek wrote about Johnny after meeting him in Philadelphia backstage in 2016. They have remained friends since.

== Discography ==
=== Studio albums ===
- Here's to Your Jigsaw, Activate Records (2009)

=== EPs ===
- ...Until You Know What It's Like To Stand Where There Is No Ground. (2014)
- Sunglasses / I Would (Single, YouTube and Radio Only) (2016)

=== Charted songs ===
Year	Song	EUR Ind	Album
2010	"I Don't Mind"	92	Here's to Your Jigsaw
2010	"To Save My Soul"	97	Here's to Your Jigsaw

=== Charted albums ===
Year	Album	US CMJ
2014	Until You Know (2014)	16

== Personnel ==
- Johnny Saint-Lethal – guitar, lead vocals
- Brandon Mitchell – guitar
- Michael Ward – bass guitar (2012–2014)
- Matthew Vaughan – percussion (2012–2014)
- Jake Stretch – drums (2014-2016)
- Jacob Reiger – bass guitar (2014-2016)
