= Jocelyn and Chris =

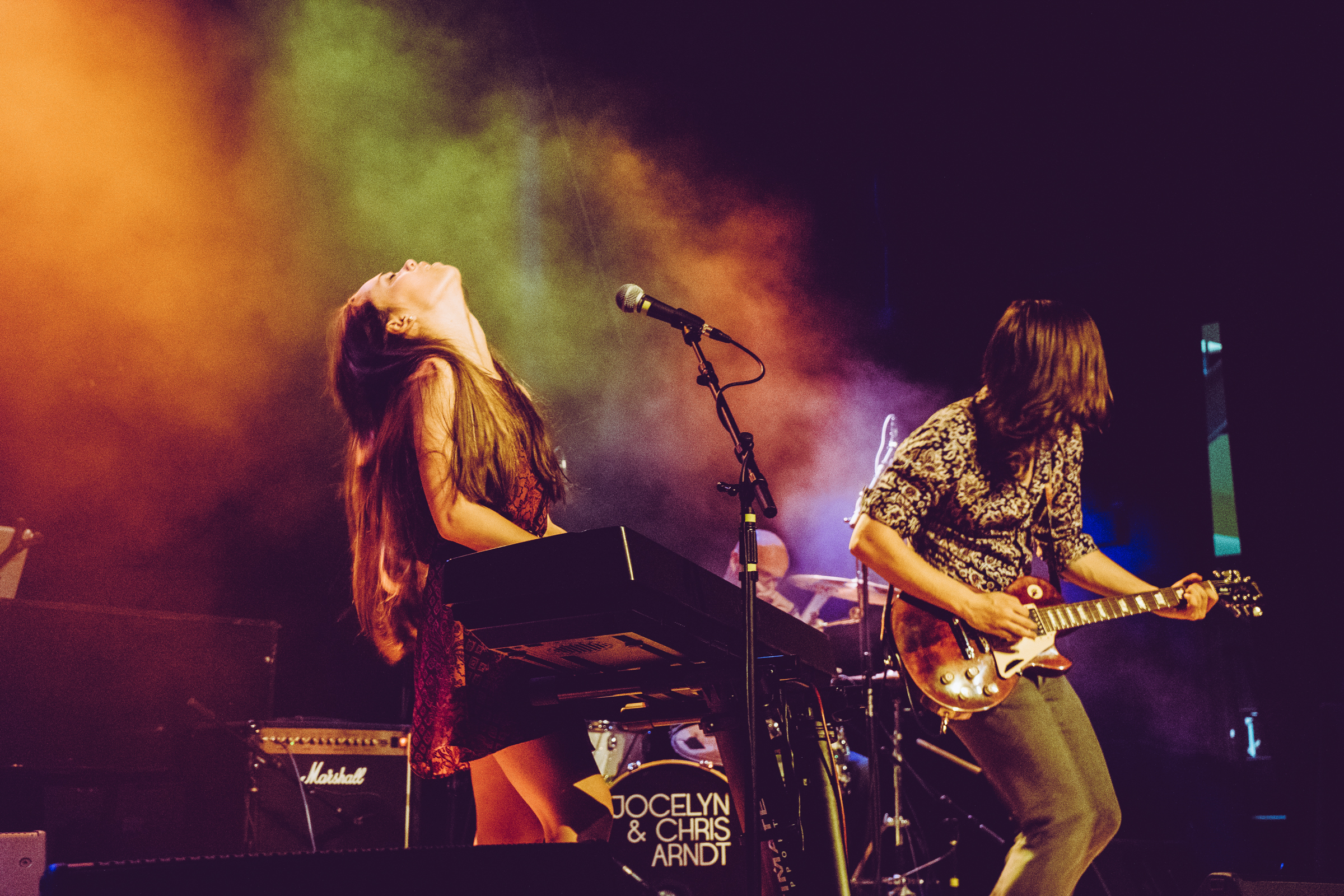
- Jocelyn & Chris perform in Cohoes Music Hall during the 2017 Move Music Festival in Albany, New York

Background information
- Origin: Fort Plain, New York, USA
- Genres: Blues rock; pop; alternative rock
- Years active: 2013–present
- Label: Bridge Road Entertainment
- Website: jocelynandchrismusic.com

Jocelyn and Chris are sibling blues-rock music artists from Upstate New York. Jocelyn sings lead vocals and plays piano, while Chris plays lead and rhythm guitar. The two write all of their music together as a brother-sister team.

== Biography ==
=== Group history ===
Jocelyn and Chris grew up in Fort Plain, a small town in rural upstate New York. The two siblings both began music lessons in elementary school. Jocelyn started learning piano in fourth grade after receiving her first electric keyboard. Chris began guitar lessons just a few months later.

Jocelyn and Chris began performing publicly at local talent shows, festivals, and fairs. Their first public performance was at a local benefit talent show when Jocelyn was 12 and Chris was 11, where they performed a cover of Led Zeppelin's "Stairway to Heaven". In middle school, they formed their own band "The Dependents.” They were performing under this moniker at the Fonda Fair in Fonda, NY, when they were approached by producer/manager David Bourgeois. The two subsequently signed a development deal with Bourgeois' music development company, Bridge Road Entertainment, in Albany, NY, in 2013.

In the following years, Jocelyn & Chris have released two studio EPs (Strangers in Fairyland and Still: A Holiday Collection), three full-length albums (Edges, Go, and The Fun in the Fight), and two live LPs (30,000 Miles and One Night in November) all under Bridge Road Entertainment. Their fourth full-length album Favorite Ghosts was released in June 2022.

=== Musical inspiration ===
Jocelyn & Chris grew up listening to a large variety of music, including blues, jazz, folk, rock, and pop. The duo frequently credit their parents' large CD collection with having had a huge impact on their current musical style. When they began to write their own original music together in middle school, this diverse range of musical influences led to the formation of a distinctive sound that has been described as "an affinity for retro grooves and classic rock moves with a unique, modern twist."

=== Education ===
In addition to their musical careers, both Jocelyn and Chris are alumni of Harvard University. Jocelyn graduated in May 2017, while Chris graduated a year later in May 2018.

=== Television ===
In a 2017 interview with Music Connection Magazine, Jocelyn revealed that she has been approached by casting agents from NBC's The Voice on two separate occasions. In both cases she declined to pursue the opportunity, opting instead to continue to write, record, and tour with her brother and their band. A December 2017 EdgeTV Network article about the group's music video for single "Red Stops Traffic" noted that Jocelyn had also turned down an opportunity to appear on the new FOX music competition show The Four.

On March 7, 2019, Jocelyn & Chris and their band performed their song "Outta My Head" live on NBC's Today Show.

=== Personal life ===
In high school, both siblings worked at Gore Mountain in North Creek, New York, Jocelyn as a ski instructor and Chris as a snowboard instructor.

== Notable performances and recording guests ==
Along with their band, Jocelyn and Chris have performed at hundreds of music festivals and venues across the country, including the Sundance Film Festival, the CMJ Music Festival in NYC, Mountain Jam Festival in Woodstock, NY, South by Southwest in Austin, TX, and Summerfest in Milwaukee, WI, where they were voted Best Act on the Emerging Artists Stage. Additionally, the group has played music venues such as The Viper Room and Hotel Café in Hollywood, CA, 3rd and Lindsley in Nashville, TN, Higher Ground in Burlington, VT, and The Bitter End and Rockwood Music Hall in NYC. They have provided direct support for X Ambassadors, Foreigner (band), Eve 6, Grand Funk Railroad, Delta Rae, Gin Blossoms, Vertical Horizon, Rick Derringer, Orleans, Dennis DeYoung, Marc Cohn, Roger Clyne and The Peacemakers, and others.

Jocelyn and Chris have featured several notable guests on their recorded material, including Byron Isaacs of The Lumineers, G. Love, Danny Louis of Gov't Mule, Cory Wong of Vulfpeck, David Baron, and Beau Sasser of Kung Fu.

Jocelyn, Chris, and their band played the main stage at the 2018 Mountain Jam Music Festival in Hunter, NY.

On March 7, 2019, Jocelyn & Chris and their band appeared live on NBC's Today Show to perform their song "Outta My Head".

== Release history ==
=== Debut album Edges ===
Edges was released in March 2016. Special guest G. Love played harmonica on track 6, "Hot." The album debuted on the Relix National Jambands Top 30 Chart at #17 in April 2016, remaining on the chart for six consecutive months and peaking in August 2016 at #14.

=== Live album 30,000 Miles ===
On January 10, 2017, Jocelyn & Chris's first live album, 30,000 Miles, premiered via streaming with Glide Magazine. 30,000 Miles entered the Relix National Jamband Top 30 Chart at #8 in February 2017, continuing to appear on the chart through March and moving back up to #8 in April.

=== LP Go ===
On May 3, 2017, Go premiered in full via streaming with Relix magazine. The album features guest players including Danny Louis of Gov't Mule on Hammond Organ, Beau Sasser of Kung Fu (also on Hammond organ), and David Baron on Clavinet, Mellotron, and Minimoog.

The week of its debut to radio, single "Footprints on the Moon" was Billboard's 5th most added Adult Album Alternative track in the nation.

The first month of its release, Go appeared at #2 on the Relix National Jamband Top 30 Chart. It remained in the #2 position through July, dropping to #9 in August and #10 in September. The album dropped off the chart in October, but as of November 2017 had reappeared at #17.

In December 2017, "Red Stops Traffic," track 6 on Go and the album's third radio single, debuted on the Billboard AAA Top 40 Indicator Chart at #37, and peaked at #35.

=== LP The Fun in the Fight ===
On November 5, 2018, Jocelyn and Chris premiered "Outta My Head," the leadoff single for a new full-length album titled The Fun in the Fight, via Parade Magazine. Jam single "Be That as It May," featuring special guests Cory Wong of Vulfpeck and Danny Louis from Gov't Mule, premiered in Relix on December 21.

The Fun in the Fight was released on February 22, 2019. The first week of its release, it reached #1 on the Relix Jambands Top 30 Album Chart. It also debuted at #50 on the AMA Albums Chart. In subsequent weeks, "Outta My Head" broke into the Billboard Triple A Indicator Top 40, peaking at #33. On June 10, the second single from The Fun in the Fight, "Kill in the Cure," impacted radio, where it was the #1 Most Added Single to Triple A radio in its first week. Following this debut, it entered the Triple A Indicator Top 40, peaking at #29 on the chart.

=== Live Album One Night in November ===
On February 14, 2020, Jocelyn and Chris released One Night in November, a collection of acoustic re-imaginings of several previously released tracks in addition to one new original song. The entire album was recorded in front of an intimate audience at White Lake Studios in Upstate New York. The new original track, titled "Mercy Me," was premiered by American Songwriter, who praised the entire LP's "raw, impressive intimacy" and noted that the acoustic format of the record "allows the band to lean into and further explore each song's unshakable roots." Following its release, One Night in November debuted on the Relix Jambands Top 30 Album Chart at #27 in February, reaching #1 the next month and then moving back to #22 in April.

=== LP Favorite Ghosts ===
In early 2020, Jocelyn & Chris announced that they were in the studio working on their fifth studio album. The ten-track effort was produced by longtime collaborator David Bourgeois in addition to 7-time Grammy winner Joel Moss. On June 17, 2021, the album's leadoff single "Sugar and Spice" and its accompanying music video premiered with American Songwriter, who called the track "pure American-rock-goodness." In addition to charting in the Billboard Adult Album Alternative Top 40, the "Sugar and Spice" music video was featured on MTV. On October 15, 2021, "Skeleton Key" was released as the second single from Favorite Ghosts. The final pre-release single, "Run Away," was released along with its music video on April 8, 2022.

Following its release to radio, "Run Away" was the #1 Most Added single to Triple A radio in the US in its first week, tied with Nikki Lane's "First High." The following week, the track debuted on the Billboard Triple A Indicator Top 40 at #34.

==== Favorite Ghosts release timeline ====
On June 17, 2022, Jocelyn and Chris released their fourth studio album Favorite Ghosts. Jocelyn and Chris opted for an unconventional record release strategy, citing their personal commitment to radio as well as their desire for listeners to experience the album as a complete body of work. To that end, the complete record is currently available exclusively to radio as well as for online physical and digital sale, but was not released in full to audio streaming service providers. Instead, digital streaming rollout occurred through a series of "chapters" over the course of the next year.

== Discography ==
=== Studio albums ===
- Edges - 2016
- Go - 2017
- The Fun in the Fight - 2019
- Favorite Ghosts - 2022

=== EPs ===
- Strangers in Fairyland - 2014
- Still: A Holiday Collection - 2016

=== Live releases ===
- "Give Me One Reason" (Tracy Chapman cover) - 2016
- 30,000 Miles (live LP) - 2017
- One Night in November (live acoustic LP) - 2020
- "Meet Me in the Morning" (Bob Dylan cover) - 2021
- "The Dolphins" (Fred Neil cover) - 2021

=== Singles ===
Title	Year	Peak chart positions	Album
Title	Year	US AAA	Album
"Footprints on the Moon"	2017	—	Go
"Red Stops Traffic"	2017	— (Note: "Red Stops Traffic" did not enter the Adult Alternative Songs chart, but peaked at number 35 on the Adult Alternative Indicator chart.)	Go
"Outta My Head"	2018	— (Note: "Outta My Head" did not enter the Adult Alternative Songs chart, but peaked at number 33 on the Adult Alternative Indicator chart.)	The Fun in the Fight
"Kill in the Cure"	2019	— (Note: "Kill in the Cure" did not enter the Adult Alternative Songs chart, but peaked at number 29 on the Adult Alternative Indicator chart.)	The Fun in the Fight
"Sugar and Spice"	2021	39	Favorite Ghosts
"Skeleton Key"	2021	—	Favorite Ghosts
"Run Away"	2022	40	Favorite Ghosts
"—" denotes a recording that did not chart or was not released in that territory.
