= The Lion (EP) =

EP by Wild Adriatic
- Released: February 5, 2011
- Recorded: 2011
- Genre: Rock and roll; blues rock
- Length: 16:13
- Producer: John Naclerio, NADA Recording, Newburgh NY

Wild Adriatic chronology
The Lion (2011)	Lock & Key (2012)

The Lion is the debut EP from American rock trio band Wild Adriatic released in 2011. At the time, the band consisted of four members.

== Track listing ==
All songs written by Wild Adriatic.

No.	Title	Length
1.	"Love and Loss"	3:31
2.	"Lion in Its Cage"	2:43
3.	"By Now"	3:07
4.	"The Writer"	3:07
5.	"Your Ways"	3:45
Total length:		16:13

== Credits ==
Wild Adriatic

- Travis Gray – vocals, lead guitar
- Shane Gilman – rhythm guitar
- Rich Derbyshire – bass
- Mateo Vosganian – drums
