= Goodbyemotel =

Australian musical group

- Origin: Melbourne, Australia
- Genres: Rock
- Years active: 2008-present
- Members: Gustaf Sjödin Enström, Tom Marks, David Schmidt, Scott Pioro, Paul Amorese
- Website: www.goodbyemotel.com

Goodbyemotel (stylised as goodbyemotel) is a rock band formed in Melbourne, Australia in 2008. They are currently based out of Brooklyn, New York. The band attracted attention after live performances at several CMJ music festivals, and after their music was used on television. Several high profile music industry veterans contributed to the recording of their 2014 album If. goodbyemotel is best known for their "4D Live Music Experience."

== History ==
The band formed in Melbourne, Australia in 2008 and later moved to Brooklyn, New York. They attracted considerable attention after their song "Set it Off" from their People EP was featured in a Chrysler Australia advertisement and then went into heavy rotation on several Australian radio stations. Their song "Last Flight of The Bat" was featured on the television show Gossip Girl. After landing a showcase performance at CMJ in 2011, the band lost their drummer two weeks prior to departure for the United States. Despite having to fill in performances with session drummers on short notice, the event was a success and goodbyemotel was invited back to perform at CMJ's 2012 and 2013 festivals.

Several industry veterans were involved in the creation of goodbyemotel’s 2014 album If. The recording was produced by Kevin Killen, who has worked with Peter Gabriel, Kate Bush, and U2, and engineered by Ken Thomas, who has worked with David Bowie and Sigur Rós. The album cover for If was designed by the late Storm Thorgerson, who created cover artwork for several Pink Floyd albums. goodbyemotel’s current lineup includes: Australian natives Tom Marks, David Schmidt, and Scott Pioro; Swedish/Australian lead singer and guitarist Gustaf Sjödin Enström; Rochester, NY drummer Paul Amorese.

== "The 4D Live Music Experience" ==
goodbyemotel has developed the unique "4D Live Music Experience," during which the band performs in front of a scrim onto which film and 3D images are projected. Audience members are given 3-D glasses upon admission to the show so that they may experience the full effects. After several songs, the scrim is eventually dropped, leaving the band to perform a more conventional rock concert. After debuting their conceptual live video performance in New York City, they have since performed it on stages all over the United States, the United Kingdom, Japan, and Australia.

== Discography ==
- Information EP
- end/play EP
- goodbyemotel
- People EP (2012)
- If (2014)
