= Sirsy =

American rock duo

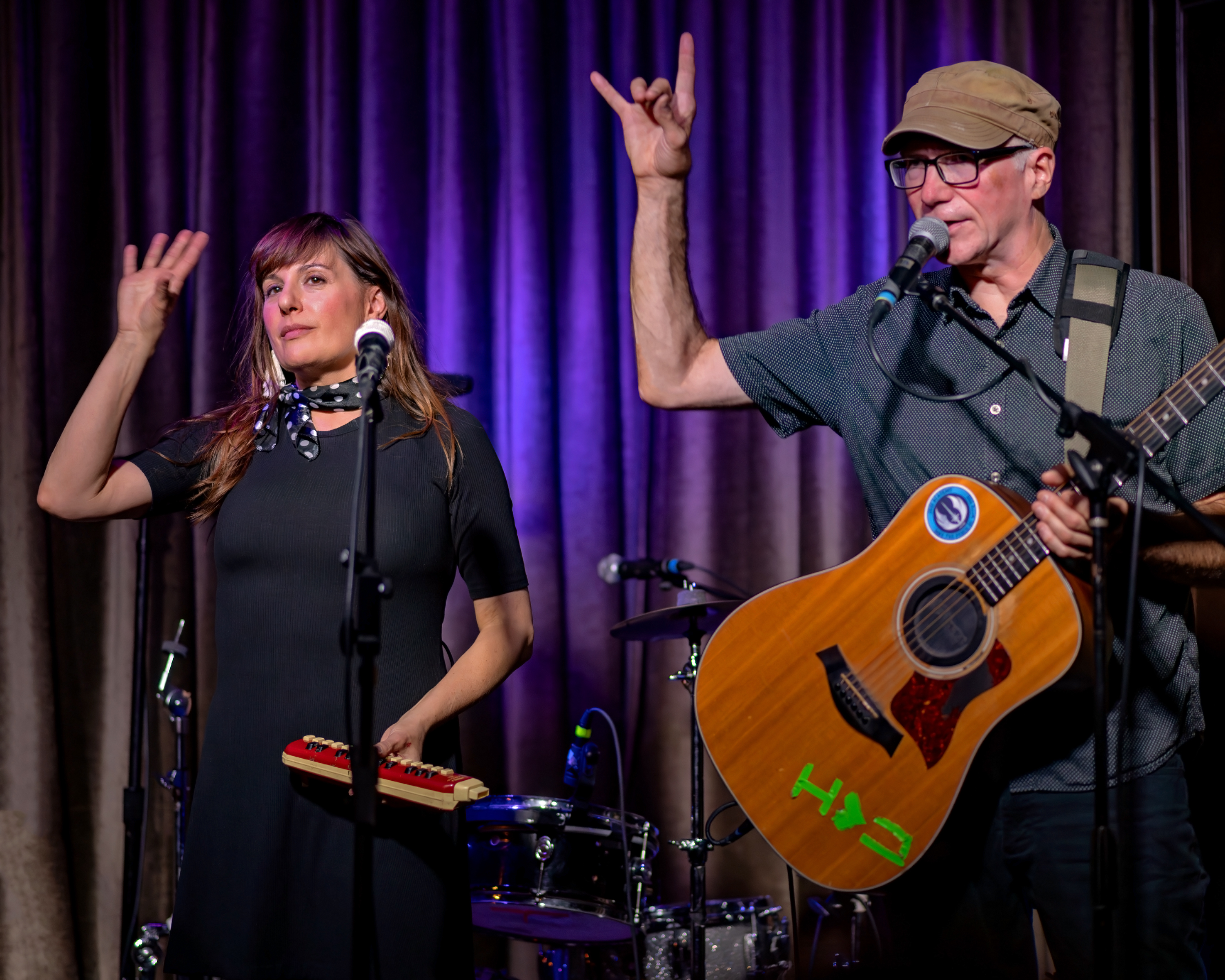
- Sirsy at the Hotel Cafe 2024

Background information
- Origin: Albany, New York, USA
- Genres: Rock, pop, indie
- Years active: 2000–present
- Labels: sirsymusic Funzalo Records
- Members: Melanie Krahmer; Richard Libutti
- Website: sirsy.com

Sirsy (stylized as SIRSY) is an American rock duo from Albany, New York consisting of husband and wife Melanie Krahmer (vocals, drums, piano, melodica, flute) and Rich Libutti (guitar, bass). During their live shows, Krahmer also plays bass on a keyboard with her drumstick and Libutti plays bass pedals with his feet.

In addition to touring the United States, Sirsy has been the opening act for artists including Brandi Carlile, Grace Potter, Maroon 5, Blues Traveler, Collective Soul, Joan Jett, The Smithereens, Cheap Trick, Vertical Horizon, Lifehouse, Fuel.

The name Sirsy came from a childhood nickname of Krahmer, whose sister called her "sirsy" instead of "sister" or "sissy"

== History ==
Sirsy formed in 2000 after Melanie and Rich met the year before in a cover band. They left the cover band to start writing songs and Sirsy was born.

In 2000, the group released Baggage. In 2002, the group released Away from Here as well as a three-song DVD The Three Little Videos, and a live album, At This Time (Live). In 2004, they released Ruby.

In 2010, Sirsy signed a record deal with Funzalo Records and re-released their then-most recent album Revolution, which was remastered by record producer Paul Q. Kolderie.

On March 5, 2013, Sirsy released Coming Into Frame on Funzalo Records which was produced by grammy-winners Paul Q. Kolderie and Sean Slade.

== Awards and recognition ==
Sirsy was Inducted into the Eddies Music Hall of Fame in 2025. Sirsy's song "Seven Seas" was named "Record of the Year" at the Thomas Edison Music Awards in 2024 Sirsy was named Rock/Pop Artist of the Year at the Thomas Edison Music Awards in 2024 Sirsy was named Solo/Duo Artist of the Year (Original Music) at the Thomas Edison Music Awards in 2023

- Metroland "Best Local Band" lists and reader polls (2003-2004, 2006, 2009-2011)
- In 2007, Sirsy placed fourth from over 1,000 entries in the "Last Band Standing", a national competition for a place in the 2007 Lollapalooza festival.
- In 2023, Sirsy won "Solo or Duo Artist of the Year (Originals)" in the Capital Region Thomas Edison Music Awards ("The Eddies")

== Television appearances and films ==
Sirsy has written theme music for and appeared in promotional spots for Time Warner Cable and the WB Network.

Sirsy's music is used in Dorian Blues.

In 2007, the band made its first national cable television appearance on the national cable network Your Music channel on the City Sessions series.

In January 2008, Sirsy made their first national television broadcast on Fearless Music. The program was shown in syndication on stations throughout the United States.

Sirsy appeared in the 2009 documentary So Right So Smart along with bands such as The Barenaked Ladies and Guster.

Sirsy's song "Cannonball" was used in the Showtime television show "Shameless" in 2016.

Some Kind Of Winter was a members' feature on the WomanRock.com web site.

Revolution was used in 2007 on the Green Arrow radio podcast network.

== Discography ==
Baggage

- Released: September 2000
- Format: CD
- Label: sirsymusic
- Writers: Melanie Krahmer, Richard Libutti, Marcus Larrabee, Jason Schultz, Michael Steiner
- Producer: Richard Libutti, Melanie Krahmer
- Tracks: "Delicious", "This Time", "Soon", "Dry", "So Good", "IOU", "Soft Like a Girl", "Let Go", "Hurricane", "Wishless"

Away From Here

- Released: March 2002
- Format: CD
- Label: sirsymusic
- Writers: Melanie Krahmer, Richard Libutti, Michael Steiner
- Producer: Richard Libutti, Melanie Krahmer
- Tracks: "She Says", "Paper Moon", "Uncomfortable", "Crybaby", "Kiss Me Here", "Please Let Me Be", "You", "Whenever You're Around", "Anyway", "Kiss Me Here (Reprise)"

At This Time

- Released: October 2002
- Format: CD
- Label: sirsymusic
- Writers: Melanie Krahmer, Richard Libutti
- Producer: Richard Libutti, Melanie Krahmer
- Tracks: "This Time", "Anyway", "Paper Moon", "Dry", "Whenever You're Around", "Kiss Me Here", "IOU", "Soon", "Please Let Me Be", "Wishless", "She Says"

The 3 Little Videos

- Released: September 2002
- Format: DVD
- Label: sirsymusic
- Producer: Richard Libutti, Melanie Krahmer
- Tracks: "She Says", "Dry", "This Time"

Ruby

- Released: May 2004
- Format: CD
- Label: sirsymusic
- Writers: Melanie Krahmer, Richard Libutti
- Producer: John Delehanty, Richard Libutti, Melanie Krahmer
- Tracks: "By July", "Hostage", "Fine", "Pet", "Lie to Me", "Soul Sucker", "Spark", "Me and My Ego", "Again", "Blacker Than Blue"

Some Kind of Winter

- Released: 2004
- Format: CD
- Label: sirsymusic
- Writers: Melanie Krahmer, Richard Libutti
- Producer: Richard Libutti, Melanie Krahmer, John Delehanty
- Tracks: "Please Come Home for Christmas" (cover), "Rockin' Around the Christmas Tree" (cover), "Santa Baby" (cover), "Have Yourself a Merry Little Christmas" (cover), "Some Kind of Winter"

Uncovered

- Released: 2006
- Format: CD
- Label: sirsymusic
- Writers: Melanie Krahmer, Richard Libutti, Michael Steiner
- Producer: Richard Libutti, Melanie Krahmer
- Tracks: "Waiting for Rain", "IOU", "Paper Moon", "Hurricane", "Kiss Me Here", "Hostage", "Uncomfortable", "Pet", "By July", "Some Kind of Wonderful"

Revolution

- Released: 2007
- Format: CD
- Label: sirsymusic
- Writers: Melanie Krahmer, Richard Libutti
- Producer: Richard Libutti, Melanie Krahmer
- Tracks: "Revolution", "Sorry Me", "Leftover Girl", "Crazy", "Waiting for Rain", "Oh! Billy", "Still", "Mary Concetta", "Mercury", "Fireflies"

Revolution (Remastered)

- Released: 2010
- Format: CD
- Label: sirsymusic, Funzalo Music
- Writers: Melanie Krahmer, Richard Libutti
- Producer: Richard Libutti, Melanie Krahmer
- Tracks: "Revolution", "Sorry Me", "Leftover Girl", "Crazy", "Waiting for Rain", "Oh! Billy", "Still", "Mary Concetta", "Mercury", "Fireflies"

BYOB Collection

- Released: 2010
- Format: CD
- Label: sirsymusic
- Writers: Melanie Krahmer, Richard Libutti
- Producer: Richard Libutti, Melanie Krahmer
- Tracks: "Fireflies" (string quartet), "Still" (string quartet), "Mercury" (string quartet), "Sorry Me" (string quartet), "Wishless" (Revolution Hall), "Waiting for Rain" (Revolution Hall), "Leftover Girl" (Revolution Hall), "Again" (Revolution Hall), "Revolution" (Revolution Hall), "Mary Concetta" (Shifty's)

Coming Into Frame

- Released: March 2013
- Format: CD
- Label: Funzalo Records
- Writers: Melanie Krahmer, Richard Libutti
- Producer: Paul Kolderie, Sean Slade
- Tracks: "Cannonball", "Lionheart", "Picture", "Brave and Kind", "Killer", "Red Letter Days", "Gold", "Lot of Love", "She's Coming Apart", "The Cost of You"

Goner…and Other Sordid Delights

- Released: 2013
- Format: CD
- Label: Funzalo Records, sirsymusic
- Writers: Melanie Krahmer, Richard Libutti
- Producer: Richard Libutti, Melanie Krahmer
- Tracks: "Goner" (studio), "Crazy" (Skylark, Seattle, WA), "Cannonball" (Skylark), "Gold" (Plush, Tucson, AZ), "Lionheart" (Crumbs Studio, Albany, NY), "Lot of Love" (Crumbs Studio), "Killer" (Crumbs Studio)

Sketches & Ghosts

- Released: 2015
- Format: CD
- Label: sirsymusic
- Writers: Melanie Krahmer, Richard Libutti
- Producer: Richard Libutti, Melanie Krahmer
- Tracks: "Thieves", "Avalanche", "Tourist", "Everybody Knows", "Always on Your Side"

Live in Youngstown

- Released: 2016
- Format: CD
- Label: sirsymusic
- Writers: Melanie Krahmer, Richard Libutti
- Producer: Richard Libutti, Melanie Krahmer
- Tracks: "Crazy", "Cannonball", "Soul Sucker", "Mary Concetta", "Goner", "Wishless", "Lot of Love", "She's Coming Apart", "Revolution", "Red Letter Days", "Killer"

Like a Drum

- Released: 2019
- Format: CD
- Label: sirsymusic
- Writers: Melanie Krahmer, Richard Libutti
- Producer: Paul Kolderie
- Tracks: "Like a Drum", "Stand", "Death of Me", "Sweet Dreams", "Satellite"
