= FreeStyle =

Television show on HGTV

FreeStyle is a show on HGTV (Home and Garden Television) where interior decorators and designers de-clutter, reorganize and move furniture and accessories around in a room, to give homeowners a dramatic new look without spending a dime. The series was originally hosted by Aaron Foster, but new episodes now feature Evan Farmer as the host. Designers featured regularly on the show include: Evette Rios, Kelley Hundahl, Kahi Lee, Taniya Nayak and Amanda Miller.
