= Black Taxi (band) =

American band

- Origin: Brooklyn, New York City, U.S.
- Genres: Post-punk revival, rock, alternative rock, indie rock
- Years active: 2007–Present
- Labels: No Shame
- Members: Ezra Huleatt; Bill Mayo; Krisana Soponpong; Daniel Gould
- Past members: Jason Holmes

Black Taxi is an American rock band that formed in Brooklyn, New York City, United States, in 2007. The band is considered one of New York City's premier live acts, and consistently sells out venues along the East Coast. To date the band has released three full-length albums, Things of That Nature (2009), We Don't Know Any Better (2012), and Electroshock Death Grip (2014), and three extended plays. The music video for their song "Shoeshine" was named an official honoree in the 15th annual Webby Award selections.

== Musical style ==
The group has an upbeat party rock musical style, which has been dubbed "grit pop" or "dance punk", drawing comparisons to Cake, Franz Ferdinand, and Modest Mouse. Their energetic live performances have been described as "frenetic" and "spaced out" and "extremely physical" and have been compared to early Red Hot Chili Peppers. Their diverse style can be attributed to their varied musical background: "singer Ezra Huleatt started off studying jazz, guitarist William Longyear Mayo was an R&B/Hip Hop session musician, bassist Krisana Soponpong an 80s synth-pop revivalist, and drummer Jason Holmes an orchestral and theatre percussionist." Their 2013 EP Chiaroscuro marked a change in the band's musical style, incorporating elements of late 70s/early 80s glam, progressive, psychedelic and dance-pop music including the influences of acts such as The Who, Pink Floyd, David Bowie, Michael Jackson, Queen, Genesis, Talking Heads, The Bee Gees, and Vangelis's film scores. The EP also includes two dance remixes which showcase contemporary influences such as Radiohead and Daft Punk.

== Members ==
- Ezra Huleatt (vocals, keyboard, glockenspiels, trumpet, megaphone, percussion)
- Bill Mayo (vocals, guitar, triangle)
- Krisana Soponpong (bass guitar, backing vocals)
- Daniel Gould (drums)

== Discography ==
- Mobius Strip (EP) (2007)
- Untitled, 2008 (EP) (2008)
- Things of That Nature (LP) (2009)
- We Don't Know Any Better (LP) (2012)
- Chiaroscuro (EP) (2013)
- Electroshock Death Grip (LP) (2014)

== Television appearances and placements ==
- G4TV's Attack of the Show!
- MTV's Teen Wolf
- Virgin America in-flight television
- Late Night Republic
- NBC's Chase
- WGN-TV Chicago's Music Lounge
- ABC's Little Night Music
- PBS's Roadtrip Nation
- FOX 5’s Good Day Live Summer Music Concert Series
- Fearless Music TV

== Film soundtracks ==
- We Are the Hartmans (2010)
- Generation Um… starring Bojana Novakovic (2012)
